= Chichen Itza =

Pre-Columbian Maya city in Mexico

- The Temple of Kukulcán (or El Castillo) is the most famous structure in Chichen Itza.

- Location within Mesoamerica Chichen Itza (Yucatán (state))
- 20°40′59″N 88°34′7″W
- Periods: Late Classic to Early Postclassic
- Cultures: Maya civilization
- Location: Tinum, Yucatán, Mexico
- Region: Yucatán Peninsula

History
- Founded: c. 750 AD
- Built: 800–1100 AD
- Abandoned: 13th century

Site notes
- Visitors: 2,000,000 (in 2025)

UNESCO World Heritage Site
- Official name: Pre-Hispanic City of Chichen-Itza
- Type: Cultural
- Criteria: i, ii, iii
- Designated: 1988 (12th session)
- Reference no.: 483
- Region: Latin America and the Caribbean

Chichen Itza (Note: Rendered in Spanish as Chichén Itzá and traditional Yucatec Maya as Chichen Itza /tʃiːˈtʃɛn iːˈtsɑː/ chee-CHEN eet-SAH, Spanish: Chichén Itzá [tʃiˈtʃen iˈtsa], often with the emphasis reversed in English to /ˈtʃiːtʃɛn ˈiːtsə/ CHEE-chen EET-sə; from Yucatec Maya: Chiʼchʼèen Ìitshaʼ [tɕʰiʔtɕʼèːn ìːtsʰaʔ] (Barrera Vásquez 1980) Yucatec Maya pronunciation "at the mouth of the well of the Itza people") was a large pre-Columbian city built by the Maya people of the Terminal Classic period. The archeological site is located in Tinúm Municipality, Yucatán, Mexico, between the cities of Valladolid and Mérida.

Chichen Itza was a major focal point in the Northern Maya Lowlands from the Late Classic (c. 600–900 AD) through the Terminal Classic (c. 800–900 AD) and into the early portion of the Postclassic period (c. 900–1200 AD). The site exhibits a multitude of architectural styles, reminiscent of styles seen in central Mexico and of the Puuc and Chenes styles of the Northern Maya lowlands. The presence of central Mexican styles was once thought to have been representative of direct migration or even conquest from central Mexico, but most contemporary interpretations view the presence of these non-Maya styles more as the result of cultural diffusion.

Chichen Itza was one of the largest Maya cities and it was likely to have been one of the mythical great cities, or Tollans, referred to in later Mesoamerican literature. The city may have had the most diverse population in the Maya world, a factor that could have contributed to the variety of architectural styles at the site.

The ruins of Chichen Itza are federal property, and the site's stewardship is maintained by Mexico's Instituto Nacional de Antropología e Historia (National Institute of Anthropology and History, INAH). The land under the monuments had been privately owned until 29 March 2010, when it was purchased by the state of Yucatán. (Note: Concerning the legal basis of the ownership of Chichen and other sites of patrimony, see Breglia (2006), in particular Chapter 3, "Chichen Itza, a Century of Privatization". Regarding ongoing conflicts over the ownership of Chichen Itza, see Castañeda (2005). Regarding purchase, see "Yucatán: paga gobierno 220 mdp por terrenos de Chichén Itzá," La Jornada, 30 March 2010, retrieved 30 March 2010 from jornada.unam.mx)

Chichen Itza is one of the most visited archeological sites in Mexico, with over 2.6 million tourists in 2017.

== Name and orthography ==
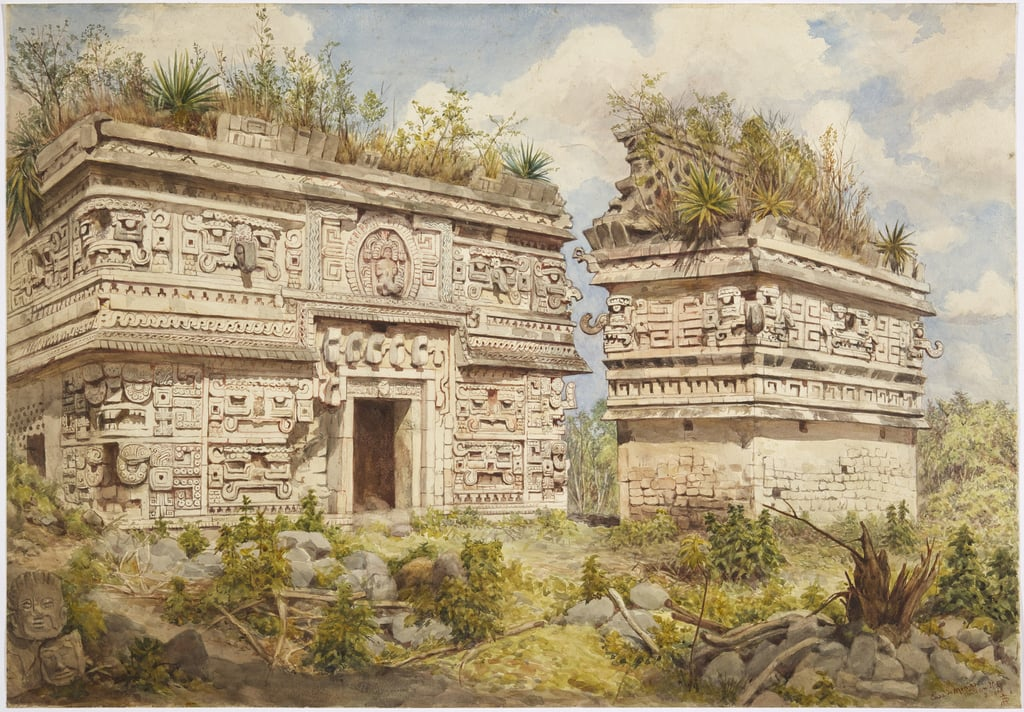
Stone facades in Chichen Itza's "Monjas" complex in 1902

The Maya name "Chichén Itzá" means "At the mouth of the well of the Itzá". This derives from chi', meaning "mouth" or "edge", and chʼen or chʼeʼen, meaning "well". Itzá is the name of an ethnic-lineage group that gained political and economic dominance of the northern peninsula. One possible translation for Itzá is "enchanter (or enchantment) of the water", from its (itz), "sorcerer", and ha, "water".

The name is spelled Chichén Itzá in Spanish, and the accents are sometimes maintained in other languages to show that both parts of the name are stressed on their final syllable. Other references prefer the modern Maya orthography, Chichʼen Itzaʼ (pronounced [tʃitʃʼen itsáʔ]). This form preserves the phonemic distinction between chʼ and ch, since the base word chʼeʼen (which, however, is not stressed in Maya) begins with a postalveolar ejective affricate consonant. Traditional Yucatec Maya spelling in Latin letters, used from the 16th through mid 20th century, spelled it as "Chichen Itza" (as accents on the last syllable are usual for the language, they are not indicated as they are in Spanish). The word "Itzaʼ" has a high tone on the "a" followed by a glottal stop (indicated by the apostrophe).

Evidence in the Chilam Balam books indicates another, earlier name for this city prior to the arrival of the Itza hegemony in northern Yucatán. While most sources agree the first word means seven, there is considerable debate as to the correct translation of the rest. This earlier name is difficult to define because of the absence of a single standard of orthography, but it is represented variously as Uuc Yabnal ("Seven Great House"), Uuc Hab Nal ("Seven Bushy Places"), Uucyabnal ("Seven Great Rulers") or Uc Abnal ("Seven Lines of Abnal"). (Note: Uuc Yabnal becomes Uc Abnal, meaning the "Seven Abnals" or "Seven Lines of Abnal" where Abnal is a family name, according to Ralph L. Roys (Roys 1967, p. 133n7).) This name, dating to the Late Classic Period, is recorded both in the book of Chilam Balam de Chumayel and in hieroglyphic texts in the ruins.

== Location ==
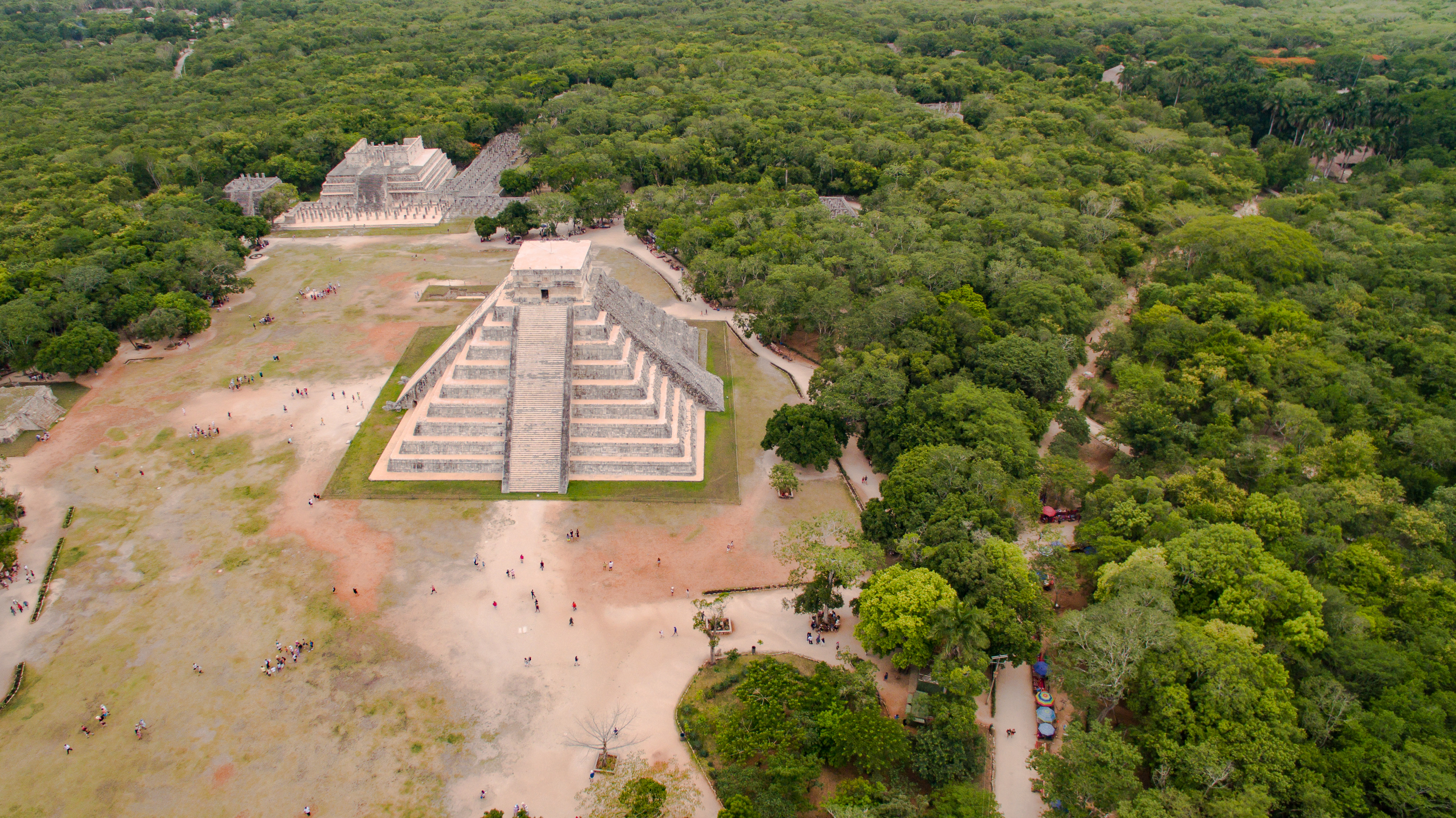
Aerial view of the Temple of Kukulan in Chichen Itza

Chichen Itza is located in the eastern portion of the Mexican state of Yucatán. The northern Yucatán Peninsula is karst, and the rivers in the interior all run underground. There are four visible, natural sink holes, called cenotes, that could have provided plentiful water year round at Chichén, making it attractive for settlement. Of these cenotes, the "Cenote Sagrado" or "Sacred Cenote" (also variously known as the Sacred Well or Well of Sacrifice), is the most famous. In 2015, scientists determined that there is a hidden cenote under the Temple of Kukulkan, which has never been seen by archeologists.

Geologically, the site's hydrologic network is connected to the broader Ring of Cenotes, a semicircular alignment of sinkholes formed along the buried rim of the Chicxulub impact crater, which facilitated the accumulation of accessible freshwater reservoirs across the dry limestone plain.

According to post-Conquest sources (Maya and Spanish), pre-Columbian Maya sacrificed objects and human beings into the cenote as a form of worship to the Maya rain god Chaac. Edward Herbert Thompson dredged the Cenote Sagrado from 1904 to 1910, and recovered artifacts of gold, jade, pottery and incense, as well as human remains. A study of human remains taken from the Cenote Sagrado found that they had wounds consistent with human sacrifice.

== Hydrogeochemistry ==
The settlement and urban expansion of Chichen Itza were fundamentally governed by the localized hydrogeochemistry of the northern Yucatán Peninsula karst plain. Lacking surface rivers, the city relied entirely on structural access to the regional phreatic aquifer, where meteoric dissolution of the Tertiary limestone cap created deep collapse sinkholes (cenotes) exposing the underlying freshwater lens.

- Chicxulub Boundary Alignment: The subterranean hydrologic network connecting the Cenote Sagrado, Xtoloc, and Holtún cenotes is structurally aligned with the high-permeability breccia fractures of the buried Chicxulub crater rim, which directs regional groundwater flow toward the northern coast.
- Halocline Stratification: The deep water table beneath the site core exhibits a distinct density stratification, featuring an upper freshwater lens floating above an intrusive marine saline wedge, a geochemical boundary that preserved organic artifacts thrown into the cenotes from rapid oxidation.
- Sub-Pyramid Sinkhole Connectivity: Geophysical electrical resistivity tomography (ERT-3D) confirmed that the sub-surface void underlying the Temple of Kukulcán forms a subterranean hydrologic node intersecting the north-south alignment of the site's primary open cenotes.

== Political organization ==
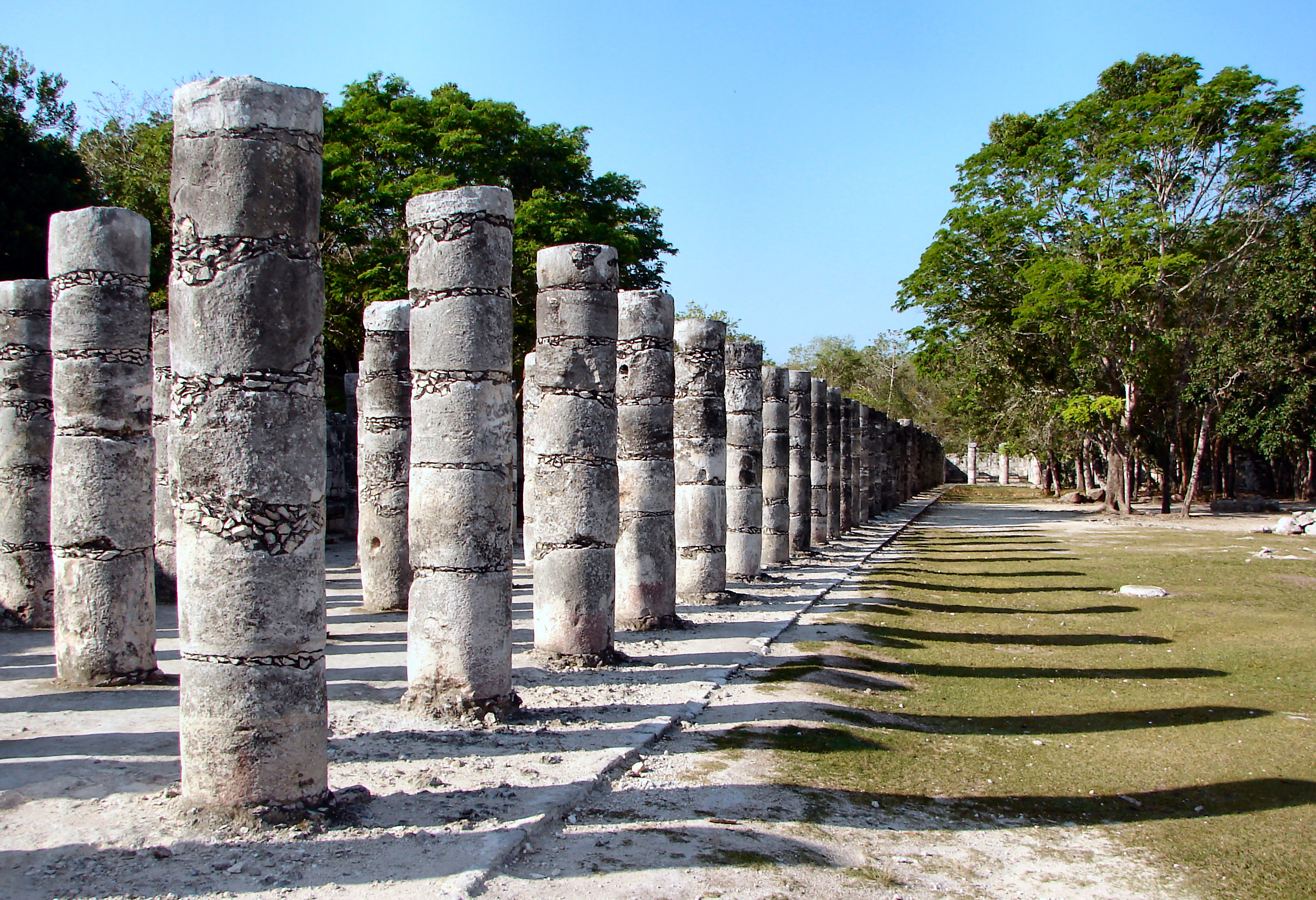
Columns in the Temple of a Thousand Warriors

Several archeologists in the late 1980s suggested that unlike previous Maya polities of the Early Classic, Chichen Itza may not have been governed by an individual ruler or a single dynastic lineage. Instead, the city's political organization could have been structured by a "multepal" system, which is characterized as rulership through council composed of members of elite ruling lineages.

This theory was popular in the 1990s, but in recent years, the research that supported the concept of the "multepal" system has been called into question, if not discredited. The current belief trend in Maya scholarship is toward the more traditional model of the Maya kingdoms of the Classic Period southern lowlands in Mexico.

== Economy ==
Chichen Itza was a major economic power in the northern Maya lowlands during its apogee. Participating in the water-borne circum-peninsular trade route through its port site of Isla Cerritos on the north coast, Chichen Itza was able to obtain locally unavailable resources from distant areas such as obsidian from central Mexico and gold from southern Central America.

Between 900 and 1050 AD Chichen Itza expanded to become a powerful regional capital controlling north and central Yucatán. It established Isla Cerritos as a trading port, which, along with another Northern Yucatan port Vista Alegre, acted as the main centers of a complex maritime market system dominated by Chichen Itza. However, such trading settlements remained relatively small throughout their use and none exceeded 300m in length, as most of these sites were built on small Islands near the coast.

Tribute and subsequent distribution of such goods was another important aspect of Chichen Itza's economy. High value wealth goods were extracted from cities it conquered militarily, in the context of its rise to power during Classic Maya Collapse.

== History ==
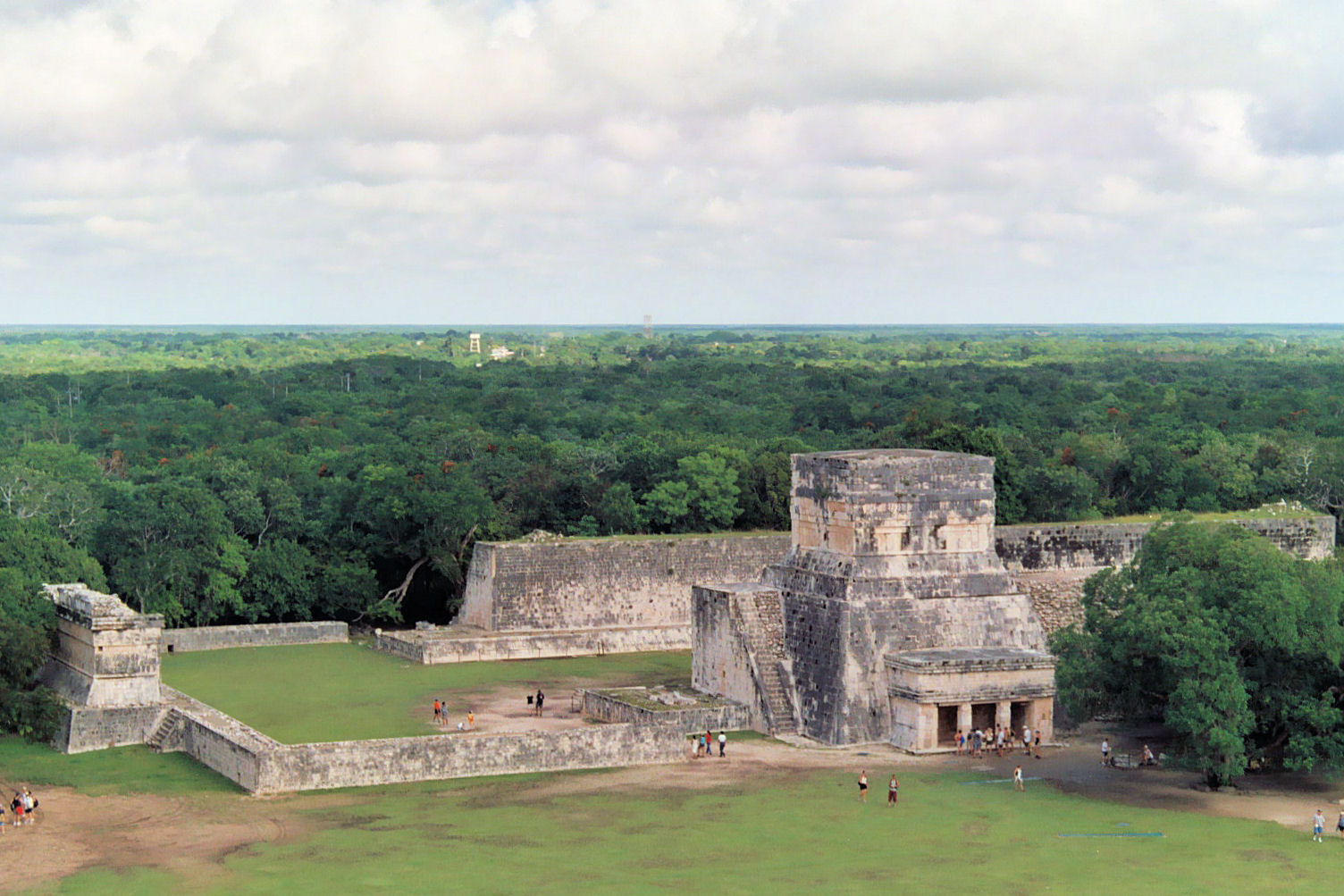
The Grand Ballcourt structures

The layout of Chichen Itza's core developed during its earlier phase of occupation, between 750 and 900 AD. Its final layout was developed after 900 AD, and the 10th century saw the rise of the city as a regional capital controlling the area from central Yucatán to the north coast, with its power extending down the east and west coasts of the peninsula. The earliest hieroglyphic date discovered at Chichen Itza is equivalent to 832 AD, while the last known date was recorded in the Osario temple in 998.

=== Establishment ===
The Late Classic city was centered upon the area to the southwest of the Xtoloc cenote, with the main architecture represented by the substructures now underlying the Las Monjas and Observatorio and the basal platform upon which they were built. While the city was founded by the local Mayans of Northern Yucatan, another group of Mayan people of debated origins, the Itza, started arriving around 800 AD and gradually established themselves in the region. The name Itza was given by the local people, meaning "those who speak our language brokenly", and is considered to be part of the namesake of Chichen Itza.

=== Ascendancy ===
Chichen Itza rose to regional prominence toward the end of the Early Classic period (roughly 600 AD). It was, however, toward the end of the Late Classic and into the early part of the Terminal Classic that the site became a major regional capital, centralizing and dominating political, sociocultural, economic, and ideological life in the northern Maya lowlands. The ascension of Chichen Itza roughly correlates with the decline and fragmentation of the major centers of the southern Maya lowlands.

As Chichen Itza rose to prominence, the cities of Yaxuna (to the south) and Coba (to the east) were suffering decline. These two cities had been mutual allies, with Yaxuna dependent upon Coba. At some point in the 10th century Coba lost a significant portion of its territory, isolating Yaxuna, and Chichen Itza may have directly contributed to the collapse of both cities.

=== Decline ===
According to some colonial Maya sources (e.g., the Book of Chilam Balam of Chumayel), Hunac Ceel, ruler of Mayapan, conquered Chichen Itza in the 13th century. Hunac Ceel supposedly prophesied his own rise to power. According to custom at the time, individuals thrown into the Cenote Sagrado were believed to have the power of prophecy if they survived. During one such ceremony, the chronicles state, there were no survivors, so Hunac Ceel leaped into the Cenote Sagrado, and when removed, prophesied his own ascension.

While there is some archeological evidence that indicates Chichen Itza was at one time looted and sacked, there appears to be greater evidence that it could not have been by Mayapan, at least not when Chichen Itza was an active urban center. Archeological data now indicates that Chichen Itza declined as a regional center by 1100, before the rise of Mayapan. Ongoing research at the site of Mayapan may help resolve this chronological conundrum.

After Chichen Itza elite activities ceased, the city may not have been abandoned. When the Spanish arrived, they found a thriving local population, although it is not clear from Spanish sources if these Maya were living in Chichen Itza proper, or a nearby settlement. The relatively high population density in the region was a factor in the conquistadors' decision to locate a capital there. According to post-Conquest sources, both Spanish and Maya, the Cenote Sagrado remained a place of pilgrimage.

=== Spanish conquest ===
In 1526, Spanish Conquistador Francisco de Montejo (a veteran of the Grijalva and Cortés expeditions) successfully petitioned the King of Spain for a charter to conquer Yucatán. His first campaign in 1527, which covered much of the Yucatán Peninsula, decimated his forces but ended with the establishment of a small fort at Xaman Haʼ, south of what is today Cancún. Montejo returned to Yucatán in 1531 with reinforcements and established his main base at Campeche on the west coast. He sent his son, Francisco Montejo The Younger, in late 1532 to conquer the interior of the Yucatán Peninsula from the north. The objective from the beginning was to go to Chichen Itza and establish a capital.

Montejo the Younger eventually arrived at Chichen Itza, which he renamed Ciudad Real. At first he encountered no resistance, and set about dividing the lands around the city and awarding them to his soldiers. The Maya became more hostile over time, and eventually they laid siege to the Spanish, cutting off their supply line to the coast, and forcing them to barricade themselves among the ruins of the ancient city. Months passed, but no reinforcements arrived. Montejo the Younger attempted an all-out assault against the Maya and lost 150 of his remaining troops. He was forced to abandon Chichen Itza in 1534 under cover of darkness. By 1535, all Spanish had been driven from the Yucatán Peninsula.

Montejo eventually returned to Yucatán and, by recruiting Maya from Campeche and Champoton, built a large Indio-Spanish army and conquered the peninsula. The Spanish crown later issued a land grant that included Chichen Itza and by 1588 it was a working cattle ranch.

=== Modern history ===
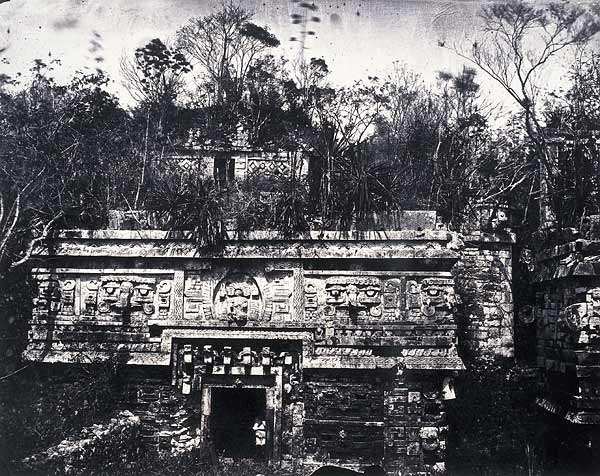
Chichen Itza in 1859–1860 by Désiré Charnay, before vegetation was removed

Chichen Itza entered the popular imagination in 1843 with the book Incidents of Travel in Yucatan by John Lloyd Stephens (with illustrations by Frederick Catherwood). The book recounted Stephens's visit to Yucatán and his tour of Maya cities, including Chichen Itza. The book prompted other explorations of the city. In 1860, Désiré Charnay surveyed Chichen Itza and took numerous photographs that he published in Cités et ruines américaines (1863).

Visitors to Chichen Itza during the 1870s and 1880s came with photographic equipment and recorded more accurately the condition of several buildings. In 1875, Augustus Le Plongeon and his wife Alice Dixon Le Plongeon visited Chichén, and excavated a statue of a figure on its back, knees drawn up, upper torso raised on its elbows with a plate on its stomach. Augustus Le Plongeon called it "Chaacmol" (later renamed "Chac Mool", which has been the term to describe all types of this statuary found in Mesoamerica). Teobert Maler and Alfred Maudslay explored Chichén in the 1880s and both spent several weeks at the site and took extensive photographs. Maudslay published the first long-form description of Chichen Itza in his book, Biologia Centrali-Americana.

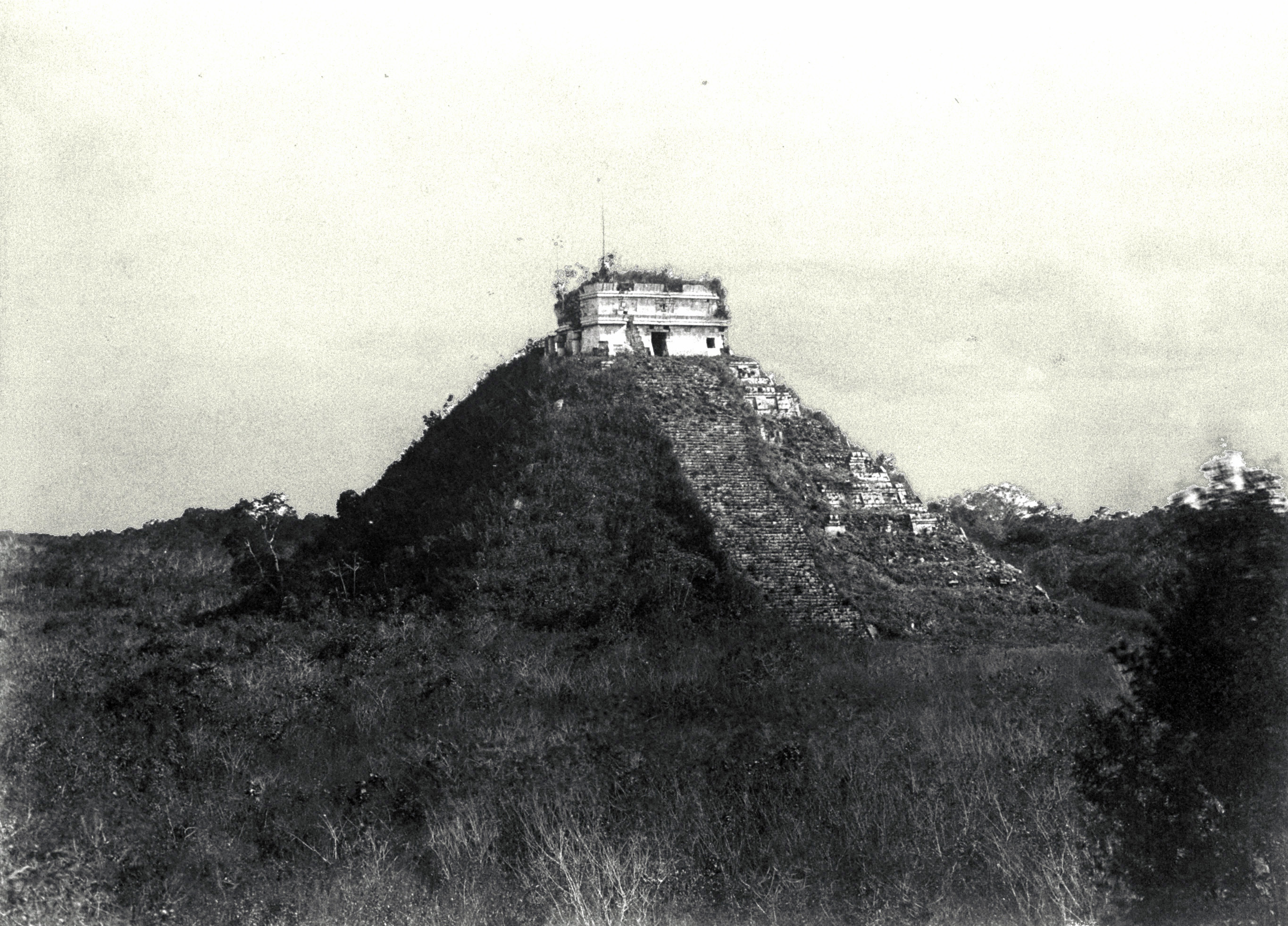
The Kukulcán Temple, photograph by Teobert Maler, 1892

In 1894, the United States Consul to Yucatán, Edward Herbert Thompson, purchased the Hacienda Chichén, which included the ruins of Chichen Itza. For 30 years, Thompson explored the ancient city. His discoveries included the earliest dated carving upon a lintel in the Temple of the Initial Series and the excavation of several graves in the Osario (High Priest's Temple). Thompson is most famous for dredging the Cenote Sagrado (Sacred Cenote) from 1904 to 1910, where he recovered artifacts of gold, copper and carved jade, as well as the first-ever examples of what were believed to be pre-Columbian Maya cloth and wooden weapons. Thompson shipped the bulk of the artifacts to the Peabody Museum at Harvard University.

In 1913, the Carnegie Institution accepted the proposal of archeologist Sylvanus G. Morley and committed to conduct long-term archeological research at Chichen Itza. The Mexican Revolution and the following government instability, as well as World War I, delayed the project by a decade.

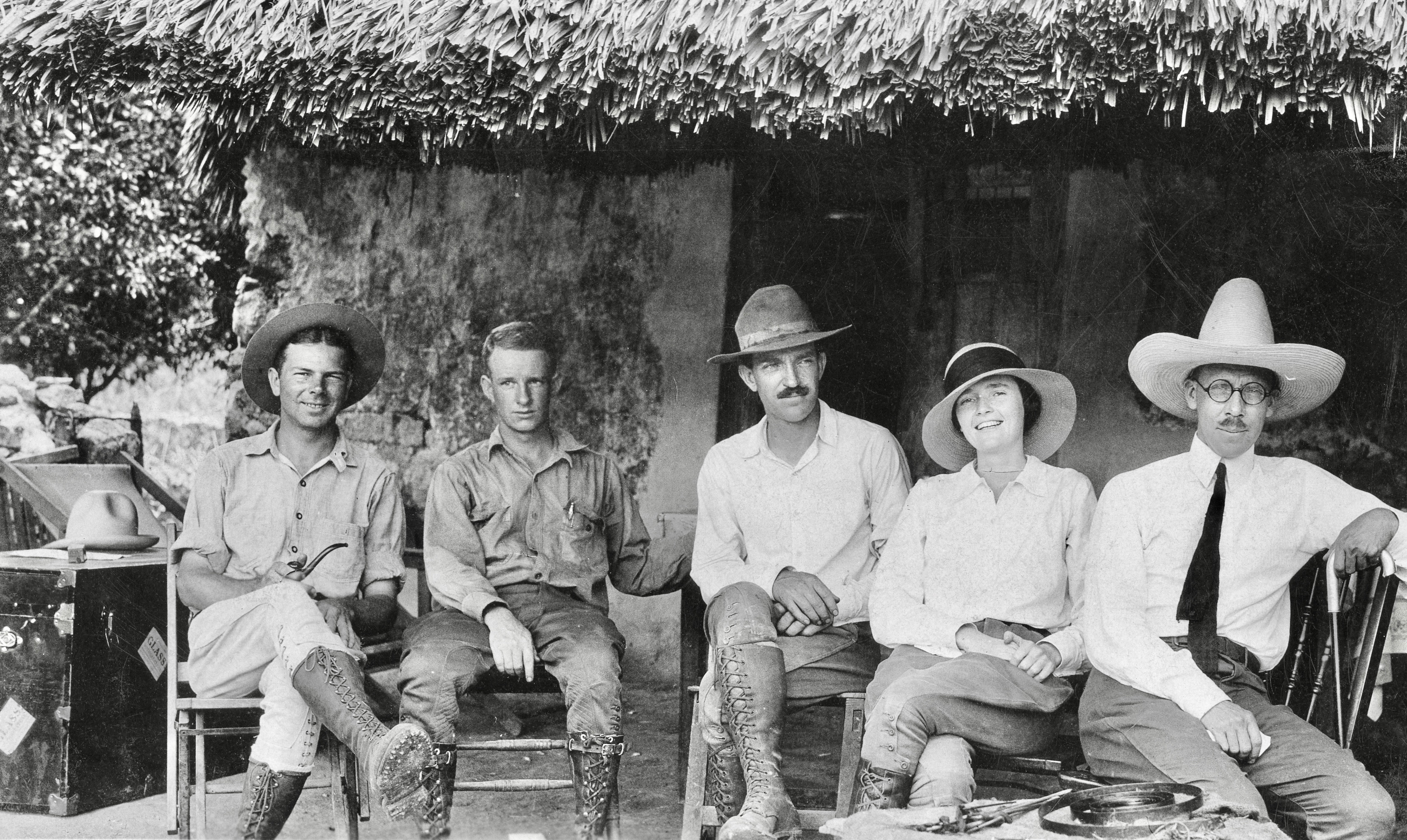
Chichen Itza, Carnegie Project staff, 1924: left to right, J.O. Kilmartin, engineer, U.S. Geological Survey; Monroe Amsden, assistant archeologist; Earl H. Morris, archeologist in charge of excavations; Ann Axtell Morris, artist; S.G. Morley, Carnegie Institution associate in charge

In 1923, the Mexican government awarded the Carnegie Institution a ten-year permit (later extended by another ten years) to allow U.S. archeologists to conduct extensive excavation and restoration of Chichen Itza. Carnegie researchers excavated and restored the Temple of Warriors and the Caracol, among other major buildings. At the same time, the Mexican government excavated and restored El Castillo (Temple of Kukulcán) and the Great Ball Court.

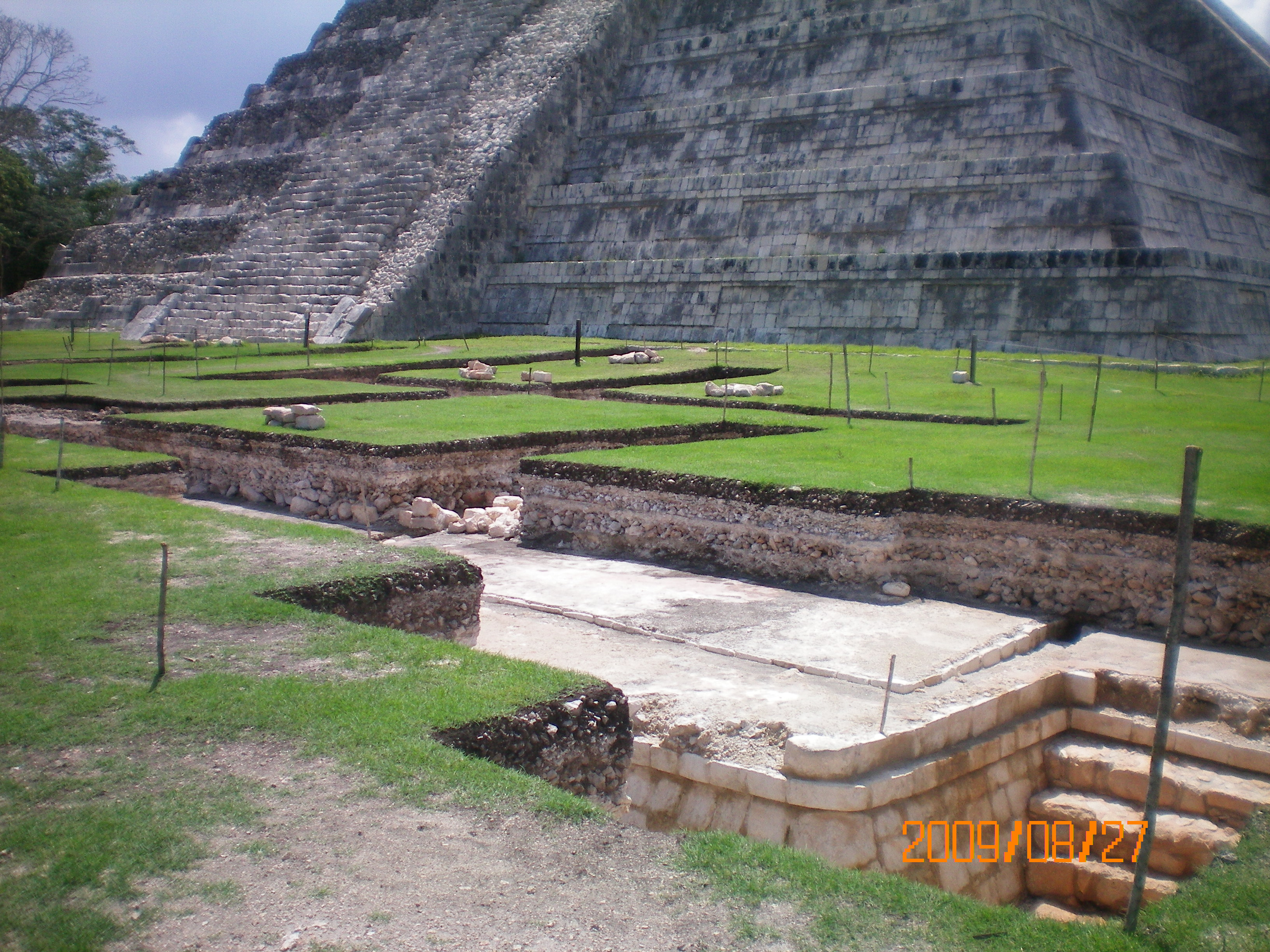
Excavations next to the Temple of Kukulcán ("El Castillo") began in 2009

In 1926, the Mexican government charged Edward Thompson with theft, claiming he stole the artifacts from the Cenote Sagrado and smuggled them out of the country. The government seized the Hacienda Chichén. Thompson, who was in the United States at the time, never returned to Yucatán. He wrote about his research and investigations of the Maya culture in a book People of the Serpent published in 1932. He died in New Jersey in 1935. In 1944 the Mexican Supreme Court ruled that Thompson had broken no laws and returned Chichen Itza to his heirs. The Thompsons sold the hacienda to tourism pioneer Fernando Barbachano Peon.

There have been two later expeditions to recover artifacts from the Cenote Sagrado, in 1961 and 1967. The first was sponsored by the National Geographic, and the second by private interests. Both projects were supervised by Mexico's National Institute of Anthropology and History (INAH). INAH has conducted an ongoing effort to excavate and restore other monuments in the archeological zone, including the Osario, Akab Dzib, and several buildings in Chichén Viejo (Old Chichén).

In 2009, to investigate construction that predated El Castillo, Yucatec archeologists began excavations adjacent to El Castillo under the direction of Rafael (Rach) Cobos.

== Site description ==
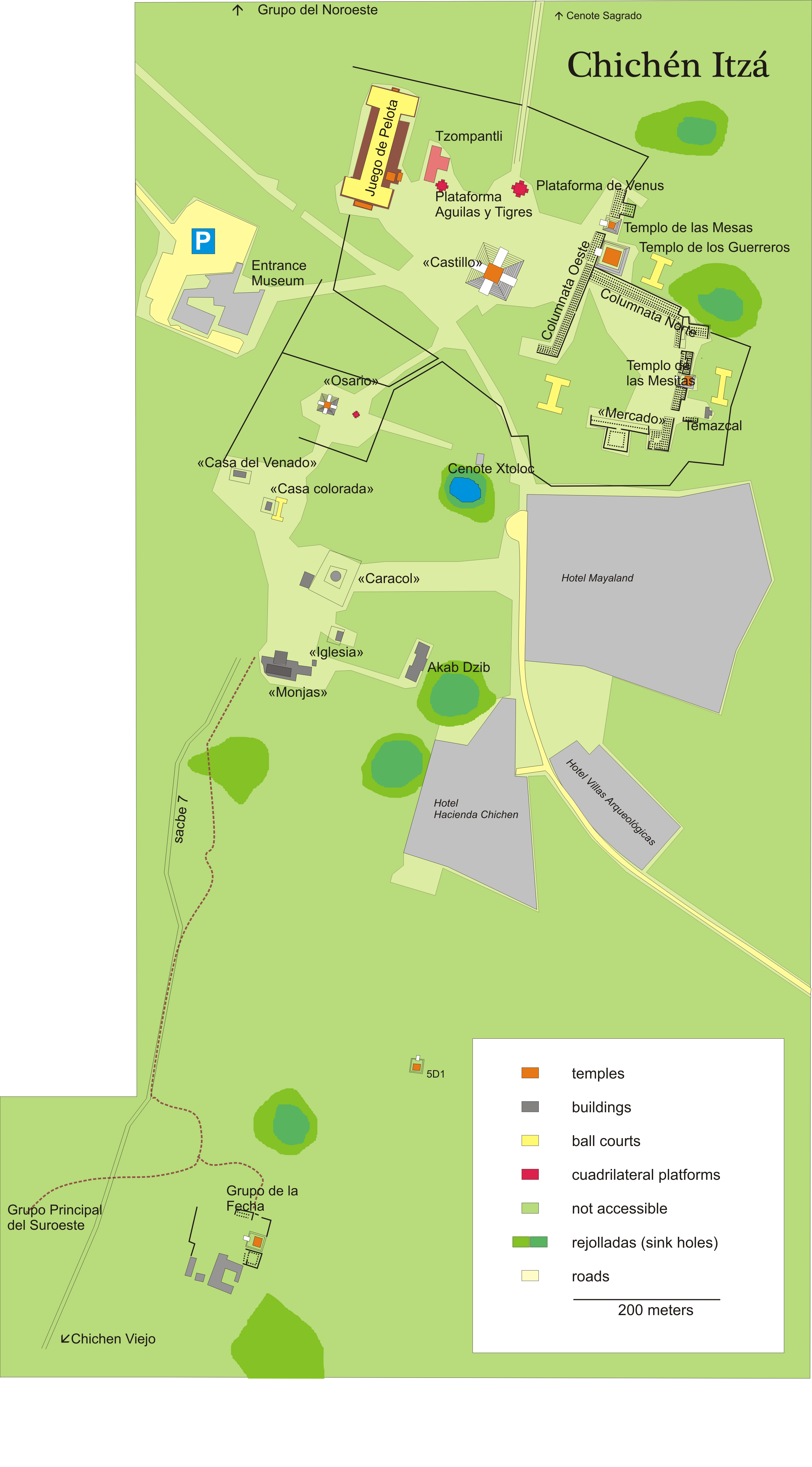
A map of central Chichen Itza

Chichen Itza was one of the largest Maya cities, with the relatively densely clustered architecture of the site core covering an area of at least 5 square kilometers (1.9 sq mi). Smaller scale residential architecture extends for an unknown distance beyond this. The city was built upon broken terrain, which was artificially levelled in order to build the major architectural groups, with the greatest effort being expended in the levelling of the areas for the Castillo pyramid, and the Las Monjas, Osario and Main Southwest groups.

The site contains many fine stone buildings in various states of preservation, and many have been restored. The buildings were connected by a dense network of paved causeways, called sacbeob. (Note: From Mayan languages: sakbʼe, meaning "white way/road". Plural form is sacbeob (or in modern Maya orthography, sakbʼeobʼ).) Archeologists have identified over 80 sacbeob criss-crossing the site, and extending in all directions from the city. Many of these stone buildings were originally painted in red, green, blue and purple colors. Pigments were chosen according to what was most easily available in the area. The site must be imagined as a colorful one, not like it is today. Just like Gothic cathedrals in Europe, colors provided a greater sense of completeness and contributed greatly to the symbolic impact of the buildings.

The architecture encompasses a number of styles, including the Puuc and Chenes styles of the northern Yucatán Peninsula. The buildings of Chichen Itza are grouped in a series of architectonic sets, and each set was at one time separated from the other by a series of low walls. The three best known of these complexes are the Great North Platform, which includes the monuments of the Temple of Kukulcán (El Castillo), Temple of Warriors and the Great Ball Court; The Osario Group, which includes the pyramid of the same name as well as the Temple of Xtoloc; and the Central Group, which includes the Caracol, Las Monjas, and Akab Dzib.

South of Las Monjas, in an area known as Chichén Viejo (Old Chichén) and only open to archeologists, are several other complexes, such as the Group of the Initial Series, Group of the Lintels, and Group of the Old Castle.

=== Architectural styles ===
The Puuc-style architecture is concentrated in the Old Chichén area, and also the earlier structures in the Nunnery Group (including the Las Monjas, Annex and La Iglesia buildings); it is also represented in the Akab Dzib structure. The Puuc-style building feature the usual mosaic-decorated upper façades characteristic of the style but differ from the architecture of the Puuc heartland in their block masonry walls, as opposed to the fine veneers of the Puuc region proper.

At least one structure in the Las Monjas Group features an ornate façade and masked doorway that are typical examples of Chenes-style architecture, a style centered upon a region in the north of the state of Campeche, lying between the Puuc and Río Bec regions.

Those structures with sculpted hieroglyphic script are concentrated in certain areas of the site, with the most important being the Las Monjas group.

=== Architectural groups ===
==== Great North Platform ====
===== Temple of Kukulcán (El Castillo) =====
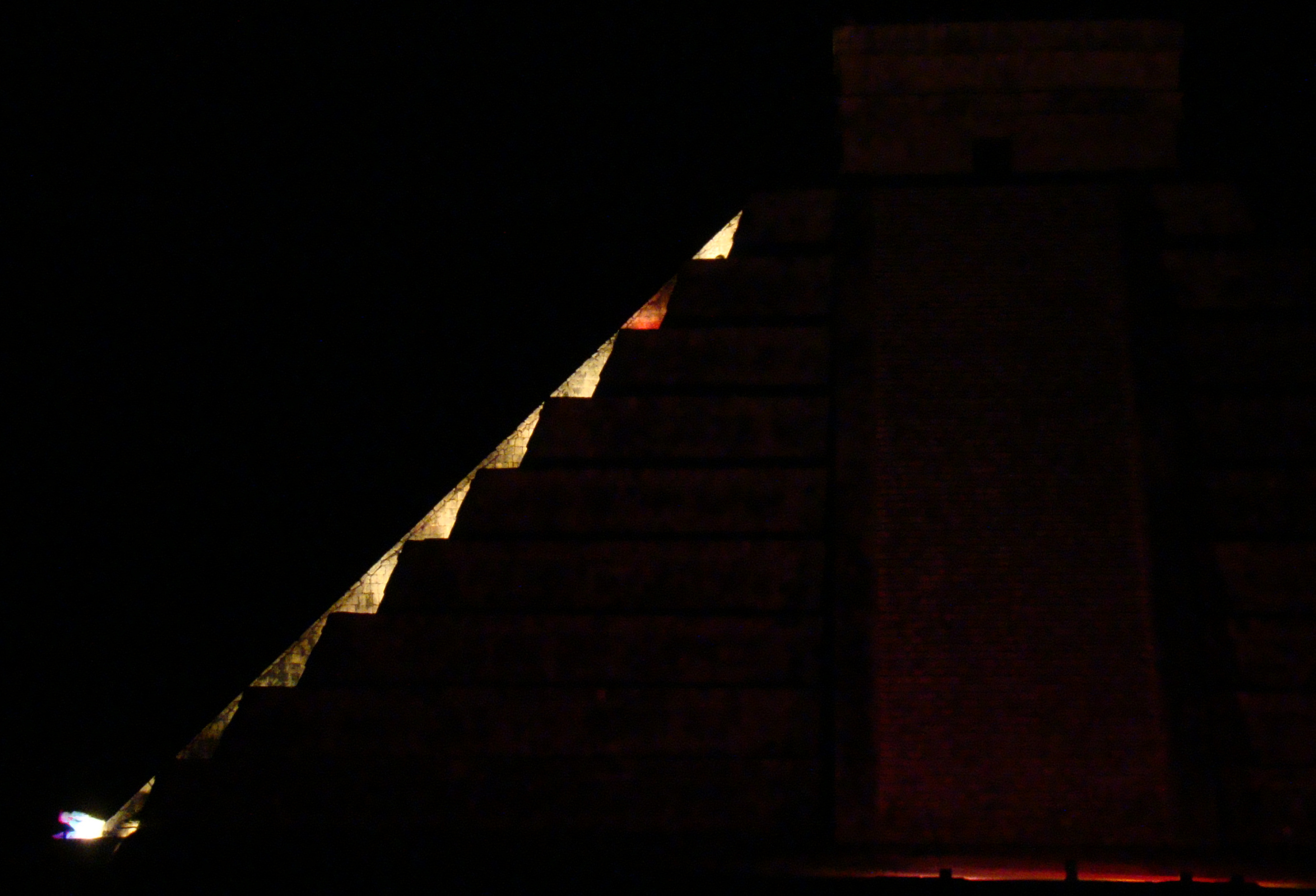
The descent of the serpent effect demonstrated at Kukulcán during the night show with artificial lighting

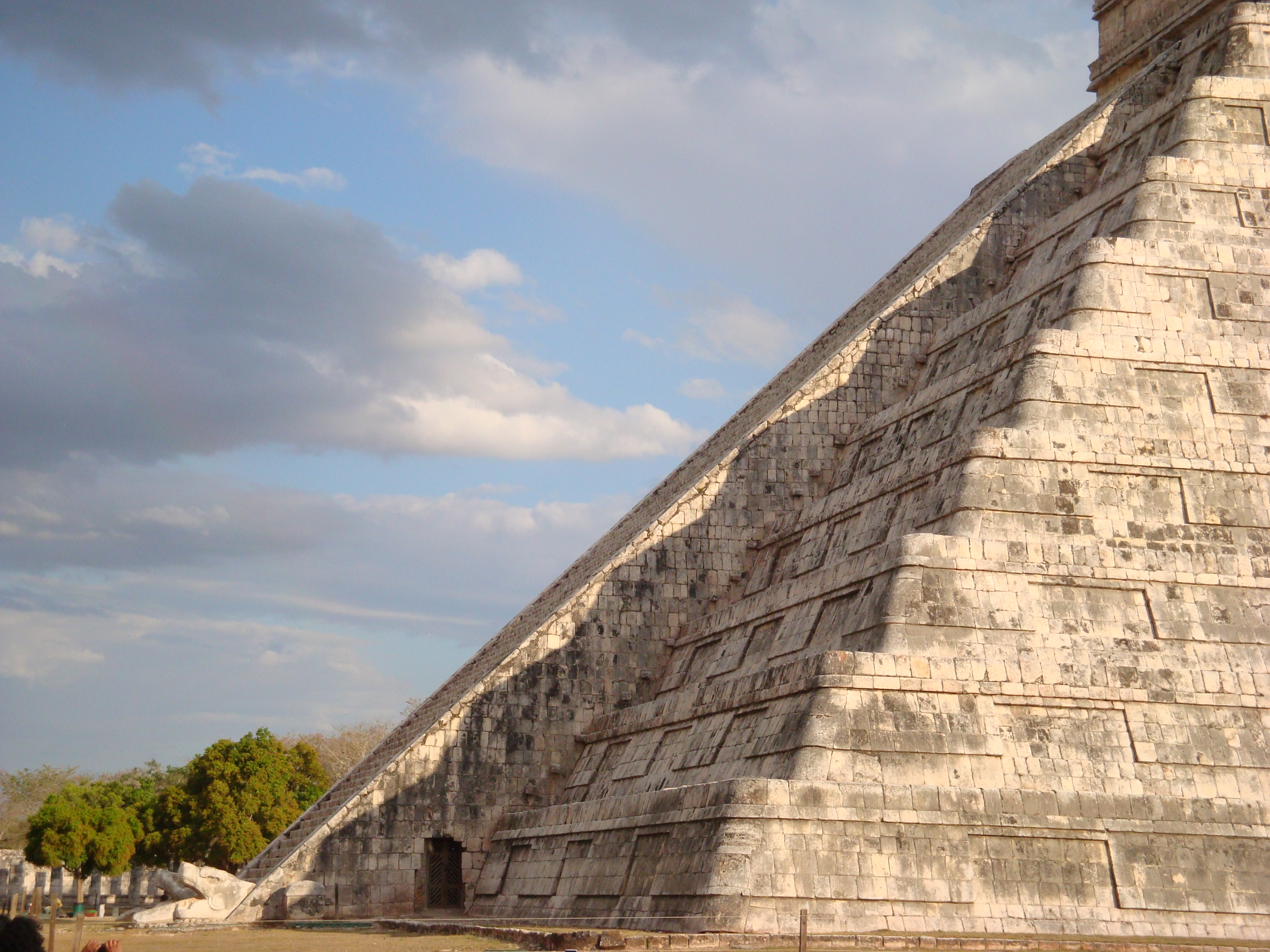
The descent of the serpent effect observed at Kukulcán during the 2009 spring equinox

Dominating the North Platform of Chichen Itza is the Temple of Kukulcán (a Maya feathered serpent deity similar to the Aztec Quetzalcoatl). The temple was identified by the first Spaniards to see it, as El Castillo ("the castle"), and it regularly is referred to as such. This step pyramid stands about 30 meters (98 ft) high and consists of a series of nine square terraces, each approximately 2.57 meters (8.4 ft) high, with a 6-meter (20 ft) high temple upon the summit.

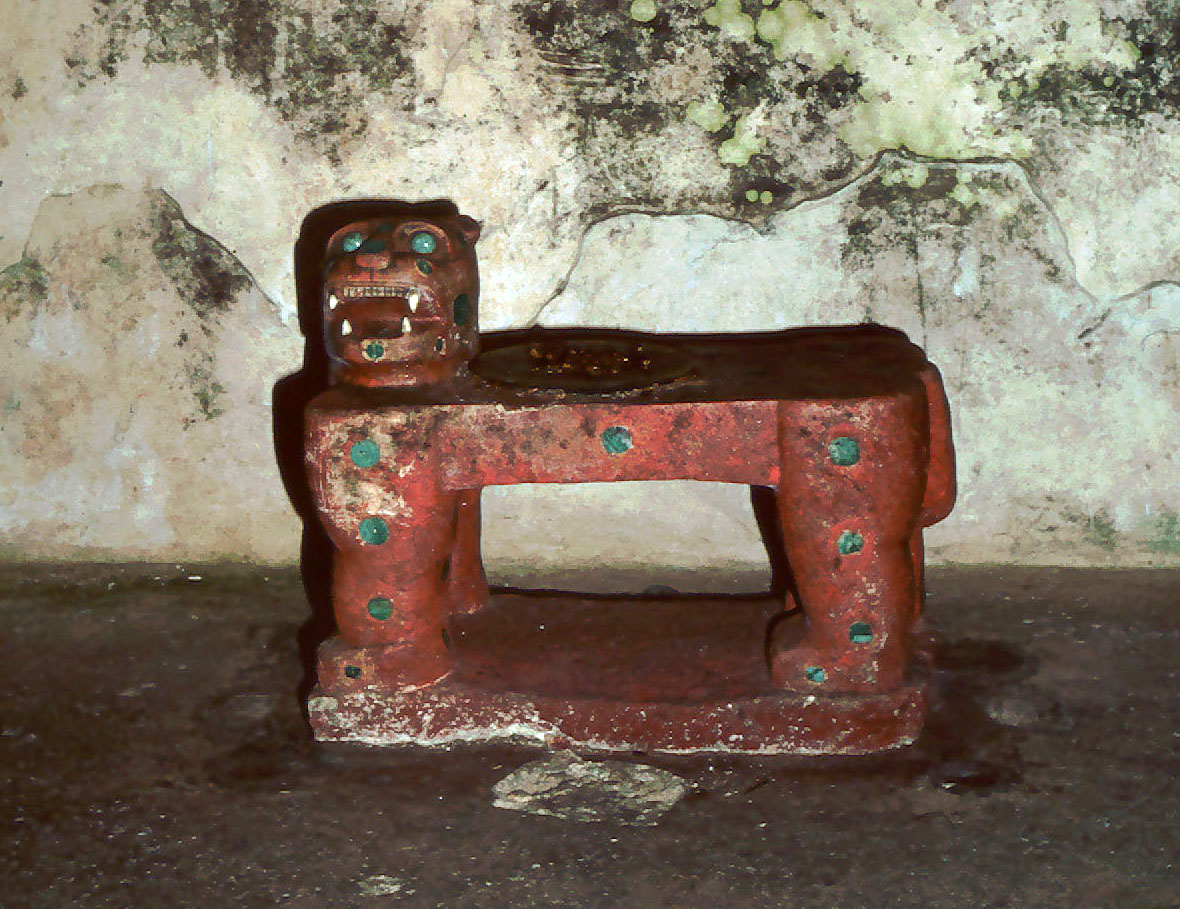
The Jaguar Throne inside the Temple of Kukulcán ("El Castillo") pyramid is red and inlaid with jade.

The sides of the pyramid are approximately 55.3 meters (181 ft) at the base and rise at an angle of 53°, although that varies slightly for each side. The four faces of the pyramid have protruding stairways that rise at an angle of 45°. The talud walls of each terrace slant at an angle of between 72° and 74°. At the base of the balustrades of the northeastern staircase are carved heads of a serpent.

Mesoamerican cultures periodically superimposed larger structures over older ones, and the Temple of Kukulcán is one such example. In the mid-1930s, the Mexican government sponsored an excavation of the temple. After several false starts, they discovered a staircase under the north side of the pyramid. By digging from the top, they found another temple buried below the current one.

Inside the temple chamber was a Chac Mool statue and a throne in the shape of Jaguar, painted red and with spots made of inlaid jade. The Mexican government excavated a tunnel from the base of the north staircase, up the earlier pyramid's stairway to the hidden temple, and opened it to tourists. In 2006, INAH closed the throne room to the public.

Around the Spring and Autumn equinoxes, in the late afternoon, the northwest corner of the pyramid casts a series of triangular shadows against the western balustrade on the north side that evokes the appearance of a serpent wriggling down the staircase, which some scholars have suggested is a representation of the feathered-serpent deity, Kukulcán. It is a widespread belief that this light-and-shadow effect was achieved on purpose to record the equinoxes, but the idea is highly unlikely: it has been shown that the phenomenon can be observed, without major changes, during several weeks around the equinoxes, making it impossible to determine any date by observing this effect alone.

Recent 3D modeling and multimodal scanning in 2025 has revealed an earlier pyramid substructure, deemed "Castillo-sub", that is enclosed within the larger "El Castillo" pyramid structure. High-resolution digital mapping demonstrated that the construction of Castillo-sub occurred earlier than El Castillo, and through a different architectural process. Castillo-sub was determined to have been built over the course of several successive stages of building enlargement, rather than one construction project during a single point in time. This sequentual process of progressive, layered construction aligns with other common Mesoamerican architectural strategies, where new rulers would expand pre-existing sacred buildings.

===== Great Ball Court =====
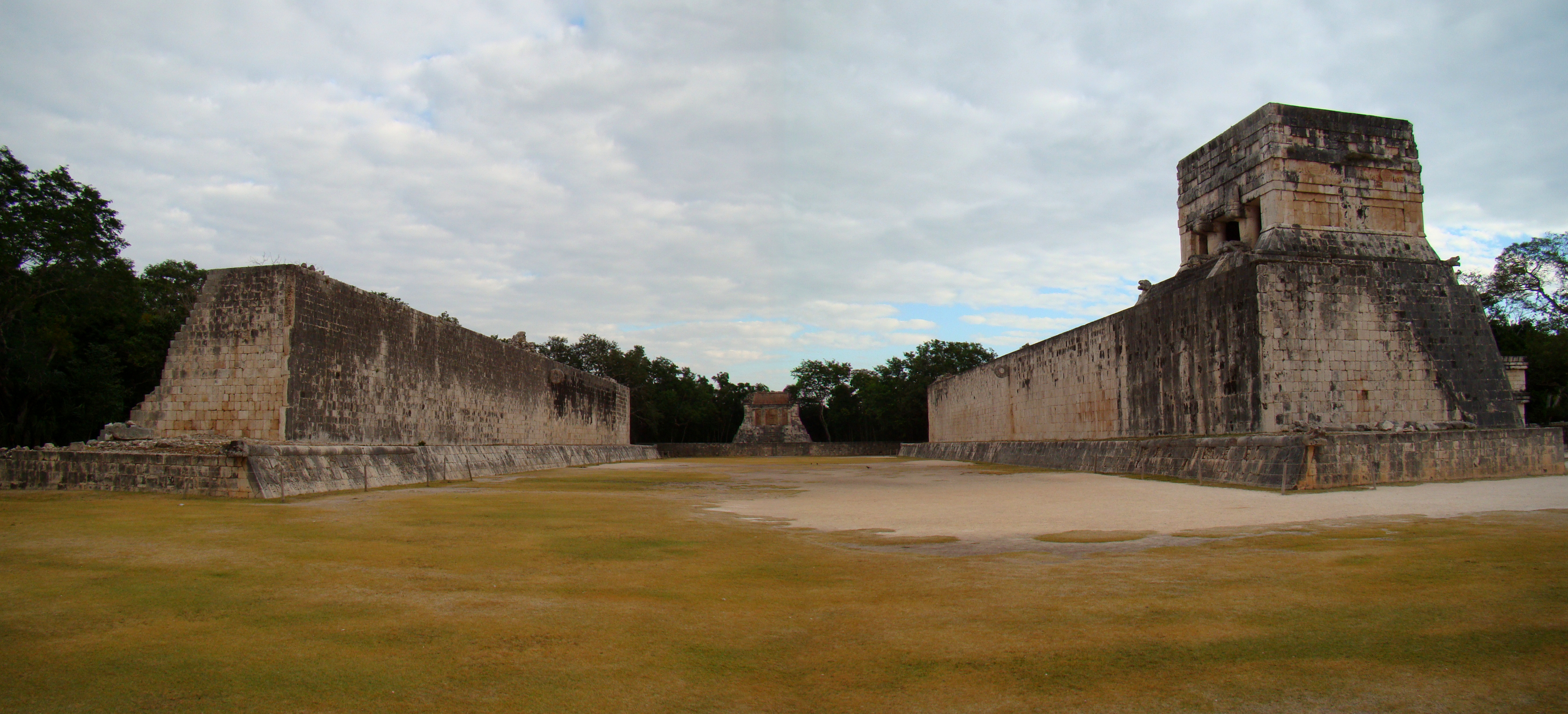
The Great Ball Court

Archeologists have identified in Chichen Itza thirteen ballcourts for playing the Mesoamerican ballgame, but the Great Ball Court about 150 meters (490 ft) to the north-west of the Castillo is the most impressive. It is the largest and best preserved ball court in ancient Mesoamerica. It measures 168 by 70 meters (551 by 230 ft).

The parallel platforms flanking the main playing area are each 95 meters (312 ft) long. The walls of these platforms stand 8 meters (26 ft) high; set high up in the center of each of these walls are rings carved with intertwined feathered serpents. (Note: A popular explanation is that the objective of the game was to pass a ball through one of the rings, however in other, smaller ball courts there is no ring, only a post.)

At the base of the high interior walls are slanted benches with sculpted panels of teams of ball players. In one panel, one of the players has been decapitated; the wound emits streams of blood in the form of wriggling snakes.

At one end of the Great Ball Court is the North Temple, also known as the Temple of the Bearded Man (Templo del Hombre Barbado). This small masonry building has detailed bas relief carving on the inner walls, including a center figure that has carving under his chin that resembles facial hair. At the south end is another, much bigger temple, but in ruins.

Built into the east wall are the Temples of the Jaguar. The Upper Temple of the Jaguar overlooks the ball court and has an entrance guarded by two, large columns carved in the familiar feathered serpent motif. Inside there is a large mural, much destroyed, which depicts a battle scene.

In the entrance to the Lower Temple of the Jaguar, which opens behind the ball court, is another Jaguar throne, similar to the one in the inner temple of El Castillo, except that it is well worn and missing paint or other decoration. The outer columns and the walls inside the temple are covered with elaborate bas-relief carvings.

===== Additional structures =====
The tzompantli, or Skull Platform (Plataforma de los Cráneos), shows the clear cultural influence of the central Mexican Plateau. Unlike the tzompantli of the highlands, however, the skulls were impaled vertically rather than horizontally as at Tenochtitlan.

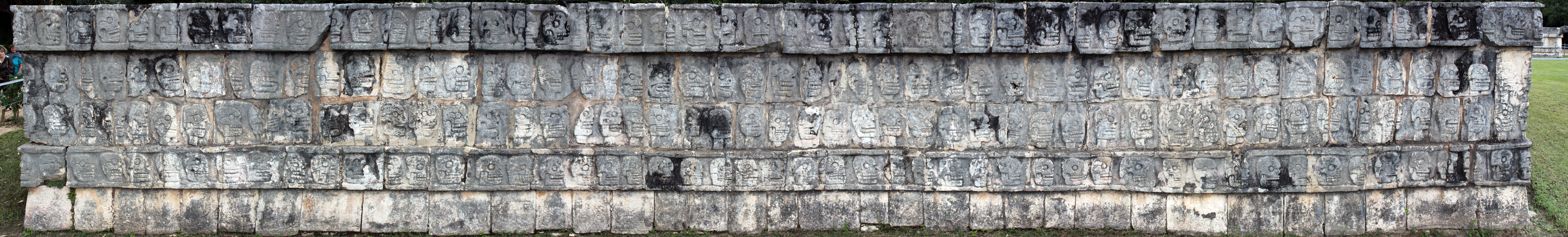
The tzompantli or Skull Platform

The Platform of the Eagles and the Jaguars (Plataforma de Águilas y Jaguares) is immediately to the east of the Great Ballcourt. It is built in a combination Maya and Toltec styles, with a staircase ascending each of its four sides. The sides are decorated with panels depicting eagles and jaguars consuming human hearts.

This Platform of Venus is dedicated to the planet Venus. In its interior archeologists discovered a collection of large cones carved out of stone, the purpose of which is unknown. This platform is located north of El Castillo, between it and the Cenote Sagrado.

The Temple of the Tables is the northernmost temple among a series of buildings to the east of El Castillo, to its north lies an area of columns. Its name comes from a series of altars at the top of the structure that are supported by small carved figures of men with upraised arms, called "atlantes".

The Steam Bath is a unique building with three parts: a waiting gallery, a water bath, and a steam chamber that operated by means of heated stones.

Sacbe Number One is a causeway that leads to the Cenote Sagrado, is the largest and most elaborate at Chichen Itza. This "white road" is 270 meters (890 ft) long with an average width of 9 meters (30 ft). It begins at a low wall a few meters from the Platform of Venus. According to archeologists there once was an extensive building with columns at the beginning of the road.

===== Sacred Cenote =====
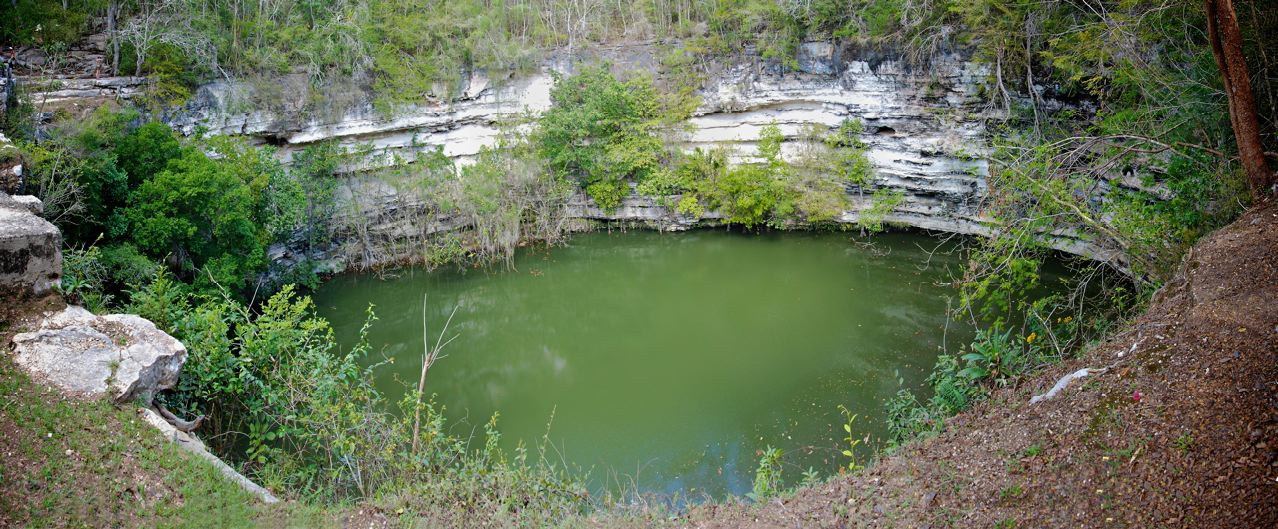
The Sacred Cenote

The Yucatán Peninsula is a limestone plain, with no rivers or streams. The region is pockmarked with natural sinkholes, called cenotes, which expose the water table to the surface. One of the most impressive of these is the Cenote Sagrado, which is 60 meters (200 ft) in diameter and surrounded by sheer cliffs that drop to the water table some 27 meters (89 ft) below.

The Cenote Sagrado was a place of pilgrimage for ancient Maya people who, according to ethnohistoric sources, would conduct sacrifices during times of drought. Archeological investigations support this as thousands of objects have been removed from the bottom of the cenote, including material such as gold, carved jade, copal, pottery, flint, obsidian, shell, wood, rubber, cloth, as well as skeletons of children, men, and women.

Offerings of artifacts and human remains have been found within the Sacred Cenote. However, the nature of how and why these were found in the cenote is unclear. Not all skeletons in the cenote displayed signs of trauma; some may have been deliberate non-violent burials. Some Spanish sources, which describe Maya sacrifices into the cenote, were written a significant time after the classic Maya period during which these supposed acts occurred, and they might have colonial biases. Whether the human remains in this cenote are evidence of sacrificial behavior is still a subject of ongoing debate.

==== Chultun of Children ====
In 1967, while building an airstrip 200 meters north of the Cenote Sagrado, workers found a small cave system that contained the remains of more than 100 children, a majority between the ages of three and six. DNA testing in the 2020s found that the remains exclusively came from males. Archaeologists have concluded that because the remains came from individuals of a narrow range of age and sex, and that DNA testing found some were related (including two pairs of identical twins), the remains had been part of a "ritual event". Although the remains show no evidence of sacrifice, some researchers believe that may have been part of the ritual.

===== Temple of the Warriors =====
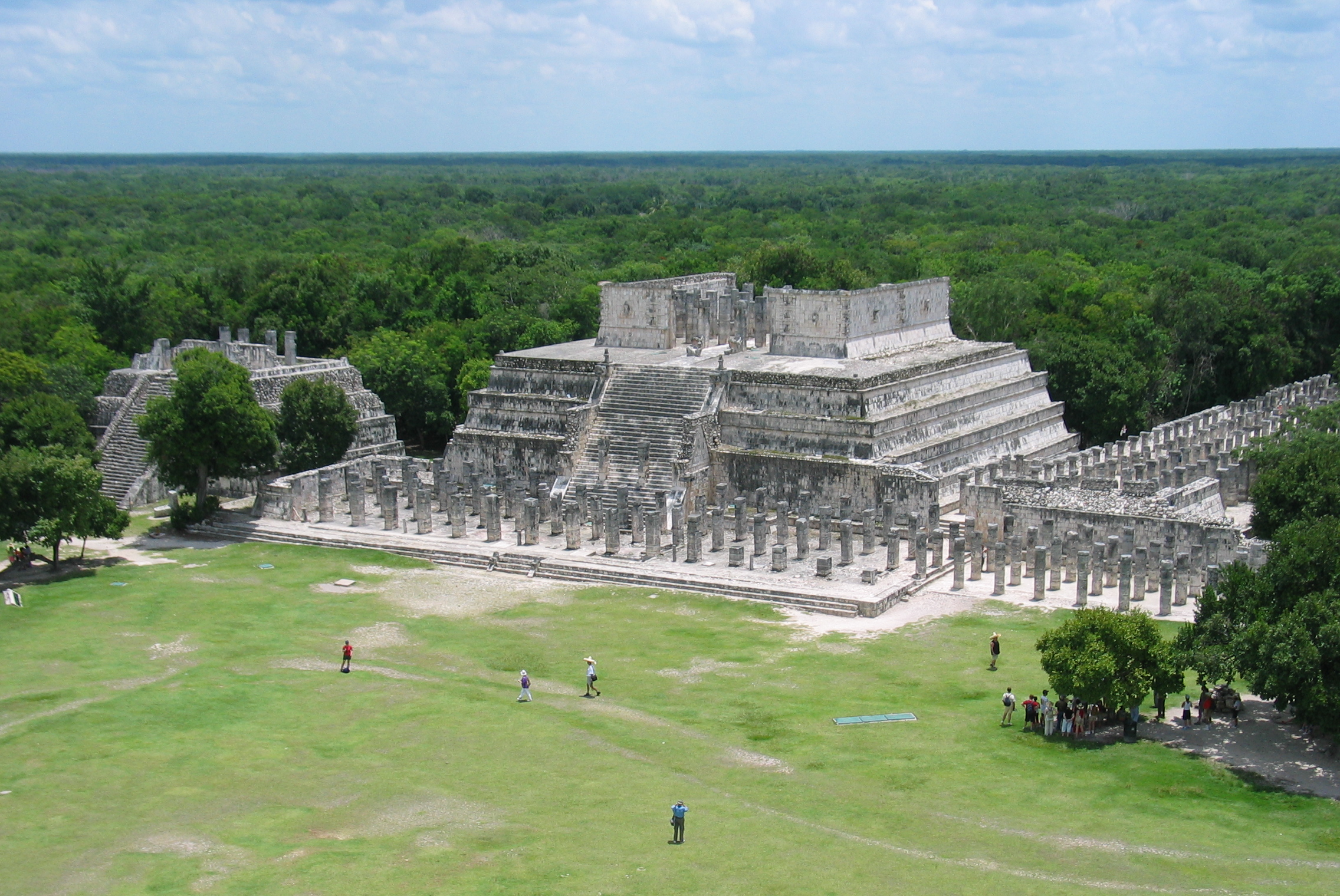
Temple of the Warriors ("Templo de los Guerreros")

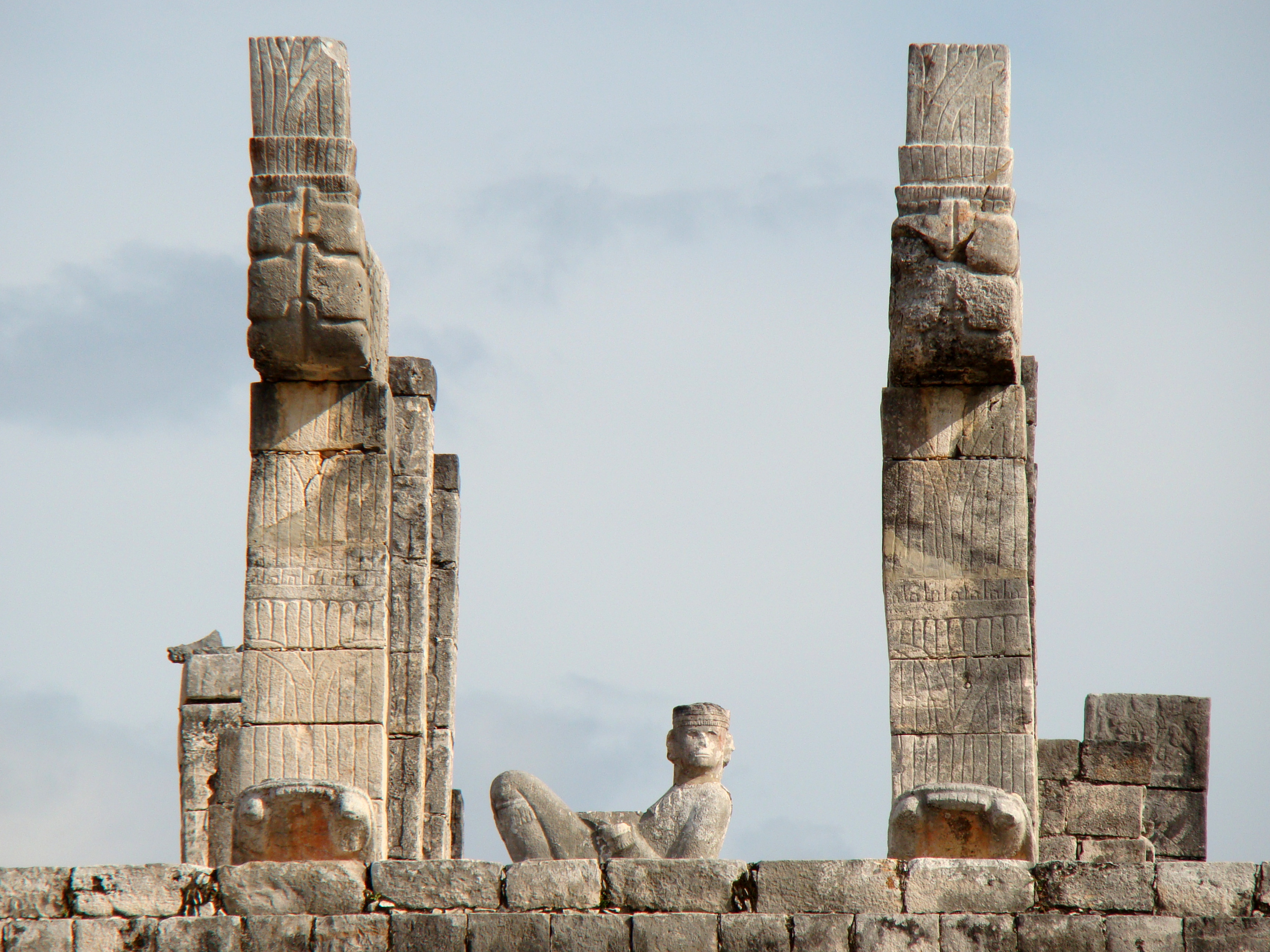
Detail of the Temple of the Warriors, showing a statue of Chacmool

The Temple of the Warriors complex consists of a large stepped pyramid fronted and flanked by rows of carved columns depicting warriors. This complex is analogous to Temple B at the Toltec capital of Tula, and indicates some form of cultural contact between the two regions. The one at Chichen Itza, however, was constructed on a larger scale. At the top of the stairway on the pyramid's summit (and leading toward the entrance of the pyramid's temple) is a Chac Mool.

This temple encases or entombs a former structure called The Temple of the Chac Mool. The archeological expedition and restoration of this building was done by the Carnegie Institution of Washington from 1925 to 1928. A key member of this restoration was Earl H. Morris, who published the work from this expedition in two volumes entitled Temple of the Warriors. Watercolors were made of murals in the Temple of the Warriors that were deteriorating rapidly following exposure to the elements after enduring for centuries in the protected enclosures being discovered. Many depict battle scenes and some even have tantalizing images that lend themselves to speculation and debate by prominent Maya scholars, such as Michael D. Coe and Mary Miller, regarding possible contact with Viking sailors.

===== Group of a Thousand Columns =====
Along the south wall of the Temple of Warriors are a series of what are today exposed columns, although when the city was inhabited these would have supported an extensive roof system. The columns are in three distinct sections: A west group, that extends the lines of the front of the Temple of Warriors. A north group runs along the south wall of the Temple of Warriors and contains pillars with carvings of soldiers in bas-relief;

A northeast group, which apparently formed a small temple at the southeast corner of the Temple of Warriors, contains a rectangular decorated with carvings of people or gods, as well as animals and serpents. The northeast column temple also covers a small marvel of engineering, a channel that funnels all the rainwater from the complex some 40 meters (130 ft) away to a rejollada, a former cenote.

To the south of the Group of a Thousand Columns is a group of three, smaller, interconnected buildings. The Temple of the Carved Columns is a small elegant building that consists of a front gallery with an inner corridor that leads to an altar with a Chac Mool. There are also numerous columns with rich, bas-relief carvings of some 40 personages.

A section of the upper façade with a motif of x's and o's is displayed in front of the structure. The Temple of the Small Tables which is an unrestored mound. And the Thompson's Temple (referred to in some sources as Palace of Ahau Balam Kauil ), a small building with two levels that has friezes depicting Jaguars (balam in Maya) as well as glyphs of the Maya god Kahuil.

===== El Mercado =====
This square structure anchors the southern end of the Temple of Warriors complex. It is so named for the shelf of stone that surrounds a large gallery and patio that early explorers theorized was used to display wares as in a marketplace. Today, archeologists believe that its purpose was more ceremonial than commercial.

==== Osario Group ====
The Osario pyramid

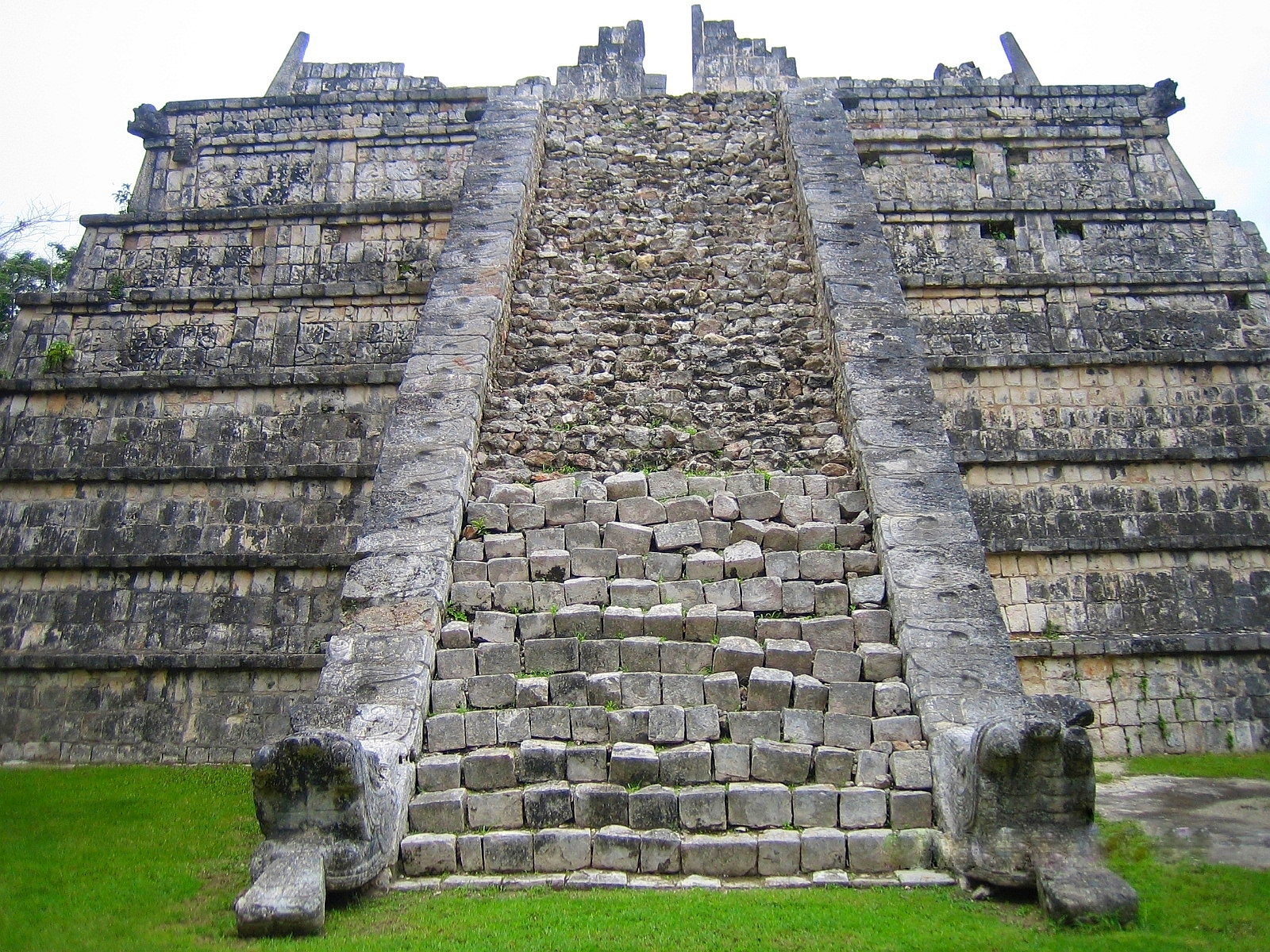
The Osario staircase

South of the North Group is a smaller platform that has many important structures, several of which appear to be oriented toward the second largest cenote at Chichen Itza, Xtoloc.

The Osario itself, like the Temple of Kukulkan, is a step-pyramid temple dominating its platform, only on a smaller scale. Like its larger neighbor, it has four sides with staircases on each side. There is a temple on top, but unlike Kukulkan, at the center is an opening into the pyramid that leads to a natural cave 12 meters (39 ft) below. Edward H. Thompson excavated this cave in the late 19th century, and because he found several skeletons and artifacts such as jade beads, he named the structure The High Priests' Temple. Archeologists today believe neither that the structure was a tomb nor that the personages buried in it were priests.

The Temple of Xtoloc is a recently restored temple outside the Osario Platform is. It overlooks the other large cenote at Chichen Itza, named after the Maya word for iguana, "Xtoloc". The temple contains a series of pilasters carved with images of people, as well as representations of plants, birds, and mythological scenes.

Between the Xtoloc temple and the Osario are several aligned structures: The Platform of Venus, which is similar in design to the structure of the same name next to Kukulkan (El Castillo), the Platform of the Tombs, and a small, round structure that is unnamed. These three structures were constructed in a row extending from the Osario. Beyond them the Osario platform terminates in a wall, which contains an opening to a sacbe that runs several hundred feet to the Xtoloc temple.

South of the Osario, at the boundary of the platform, there are two small buildings that archeologists believe were residences for important personages. These have been named as the House of the Metates and the House of the Mestizas.

==== Casa Colorada Group ====
South of the Osario Group is another small platform that has several structures that are among the oldest in the Chichen Itza archeological zone.

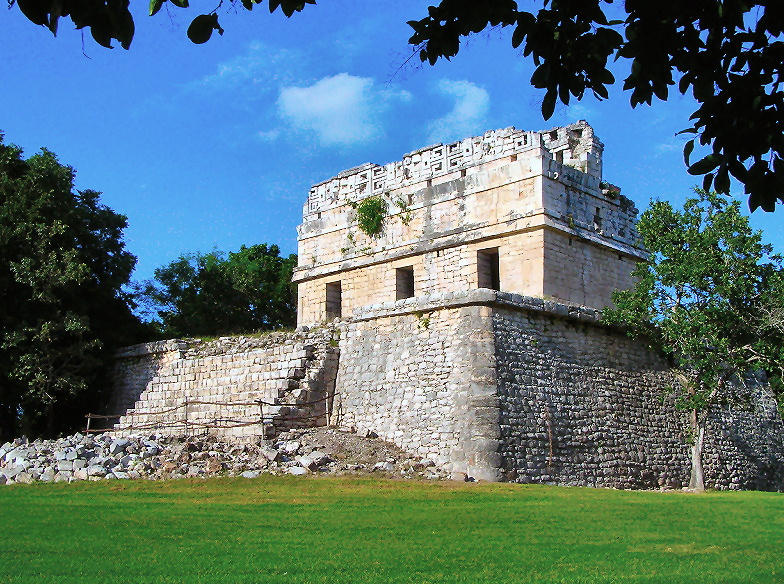
Chichanchob

The Casa Colorada (Spanish for "Red House") is one of the best preserved buildings at Chichen Itza. Significant red paint was still present in the days of the 19th century explorers. Its Maya name is Chichanchob, which according to INAH may mean "small holes". In one chamber there are extensive carved hieroglyphs that mention rulers of Chichen Itza and possibly of the nearby city of Ek Balam, and contain a Maya date inscribed which correlates to 869 AD, when ceremonies using fire were performed by lords and overseen by the king, one of the oldest such dates found in all of Chichen Itza.

In 2009, INAH restored a small ball court that adjoined the back wall of the Casa Colorada.

While the Casa Colorada is in a good state of preservation, other buildings in the group, with one exception, are decrepit mounds. One building is half standing, named La Casa del Venado (House of the Deer). This building's name has been long used by the local Maya, and some authors mention that it was named after a deer painting over stucco that does not exist anymore.

==== Central Group ====
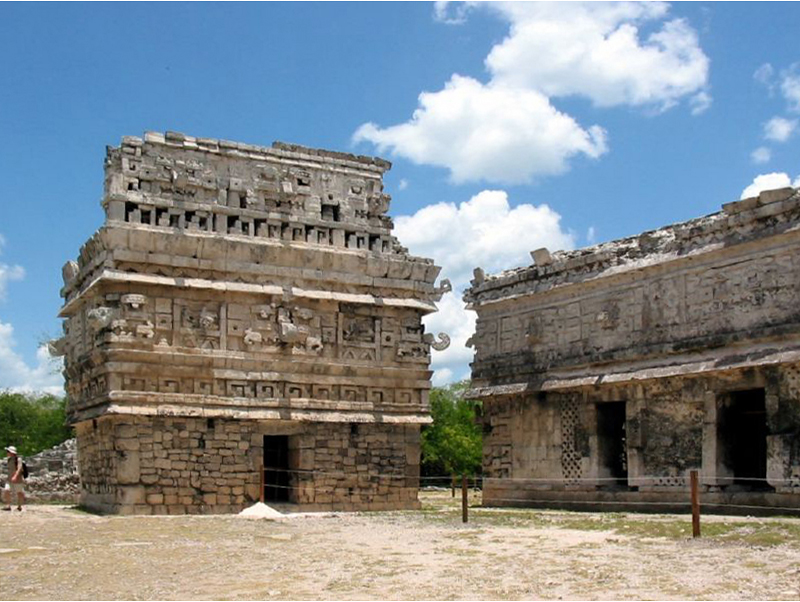
A small temple bearing many masks in the Las Monjas complex ("La Iglesia")

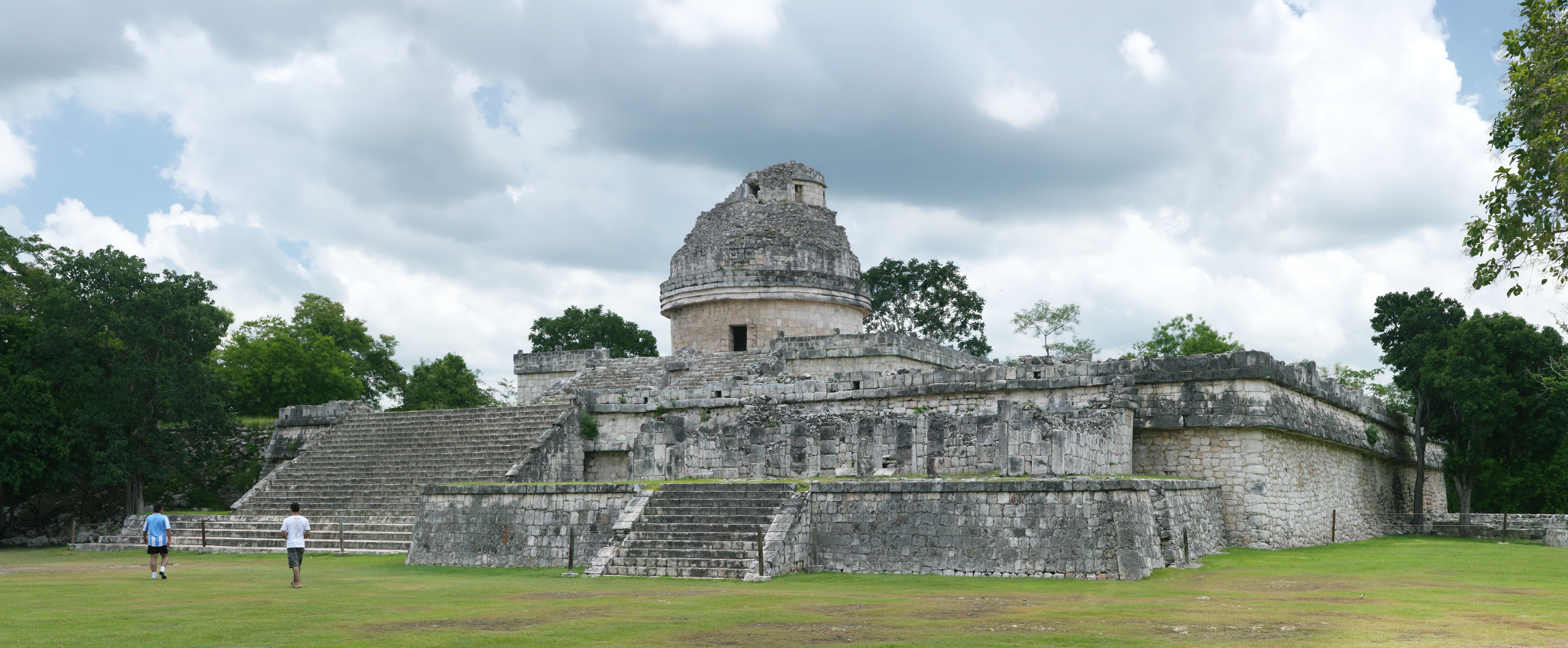
The observatory temple ("El Caracol")

Las Monjas is one of the more notable structures at Chichen Itza. It is a complex of Terminal Classic buildings constructed in the Puuc architectural style. The Spanish named this complex Las Monjas ("The Nuns" or "The Nunnery"), but it was a governmental palace. Just to the east is a small temple (known as the La Iglesia, "The Church") decorated with elaborate masks.

The Las Monjas group is distinguished by its concentration of hieroglyphic texts dating to the Late to Terminal Classic. These texts frequently mention a ruler by the name of Kʼakʼupakal.

El Caracol ("The Snail") is located to the north of Las Monjas. It is a round building on a large square platform. It gets its name from the stone spiral staircase inside. The structure, with its unusual placement on the platform and its round shape (the others are rectangular, in keeping with Maya practice), is theorized to have been a proto-observatory with doors and windows aligned to astronomical events, specifically around the path of Venus as it traverses the heavens.

Akab Dzib is located to the east of the Caracol. The name means, in Yucatec Mayan, "Dark Writing"; "dark" in the sense of "mysterious". An earlier name of the building, according to a translation of glyphs in the Casa Colorada, is Wa(k)wak Puh Ak Na, "the flat house with the excessive number of chambers", and it was the home of the administrator of Chichen Itza, kokom Yahawal Choʼ Kʼakʼ.

INAH completed a restoration of the building in 2007. It is relatively short, only 6 meters (20 ft) high, and is 50 meters (160 ft) in length and 15 meters (49 ft) wide. The long, western-facing façade has seven doorways. The eastern façade has only four doorways, broken by a large staircase that leads to the roof. This apparently was the front of the structure, and looks out over what is today a steep, dry, cenote.

The southern end of the building has one entrance. The door opens into a small chamber and on the opposite wall is another doorway, above which on the lintel are intricately carved glyphs—the "mysterious" or "obscure" writing that gives the building its name today. Under the lintel in the doorjamb is another carved panel of a seated figure surrounded by more glyphs. Inside one of the chambers, near the ceiling, is a painted hand print.

==== Old Chichén ====
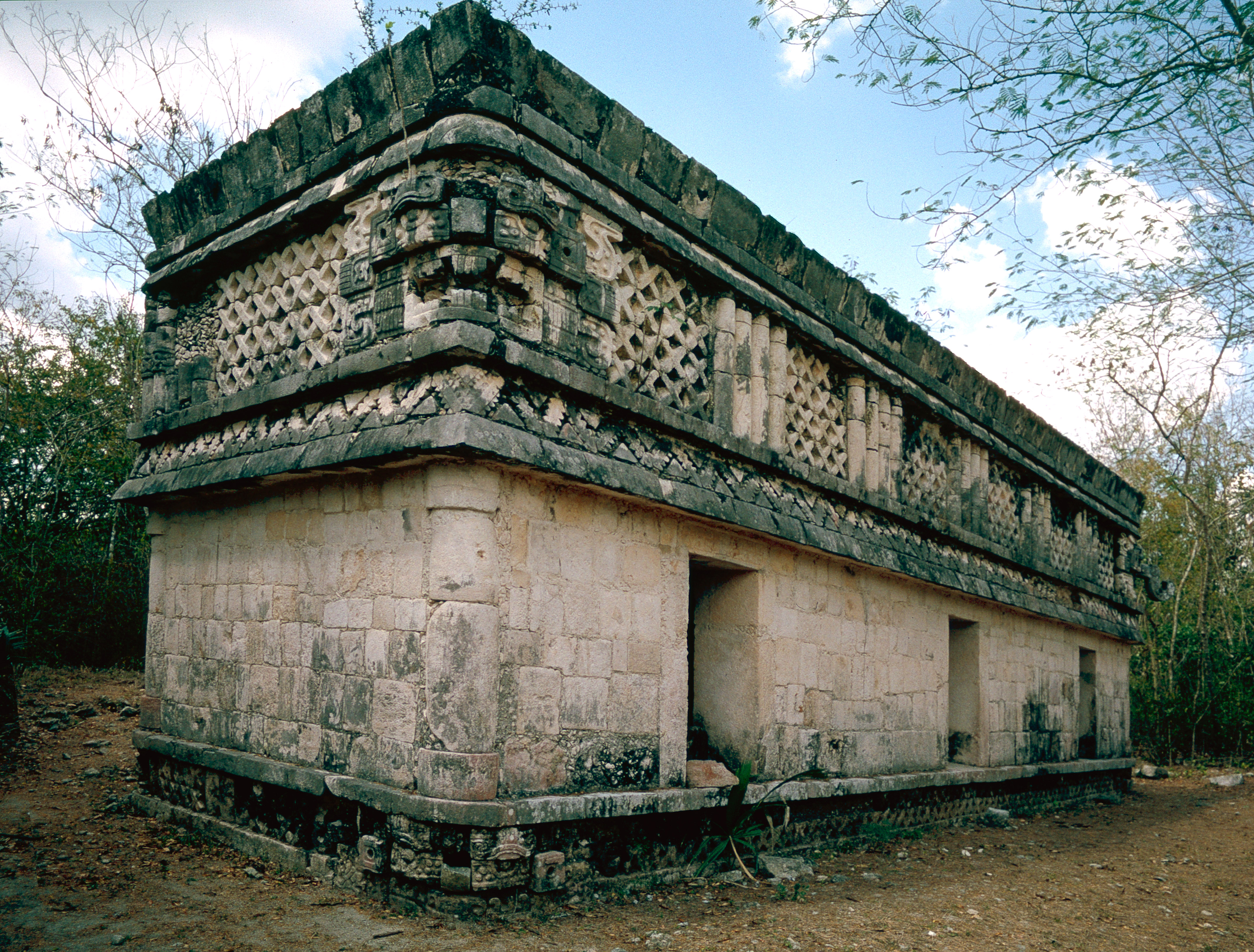
"Temple of 3 Lintels" in Chichén Viejo group

Old Chichén (or Chichén Viejo in Spanish) is the name given to a group of structures to the south of the central site, where most of the Puuc-style architecture of the city is concentrated. It includes the Initial Series Group, the Phallic Temple, the Platform of the Great Turtle, the Temple of the Owls, and the Temple of the Monkeys.

This section of the site has been closed to tourism for years while archaeological excavations and restorations were ongoing, and is planned to reopen to visitors in 2024.

==== Other structures ====
Chichen Itza also has a variety of other structures densely packed in the ceremonial center of about 5 square kilometers (1.9 mi^{2}) and several outlying subsidiary sites.

==== Caves of Balankanche ====
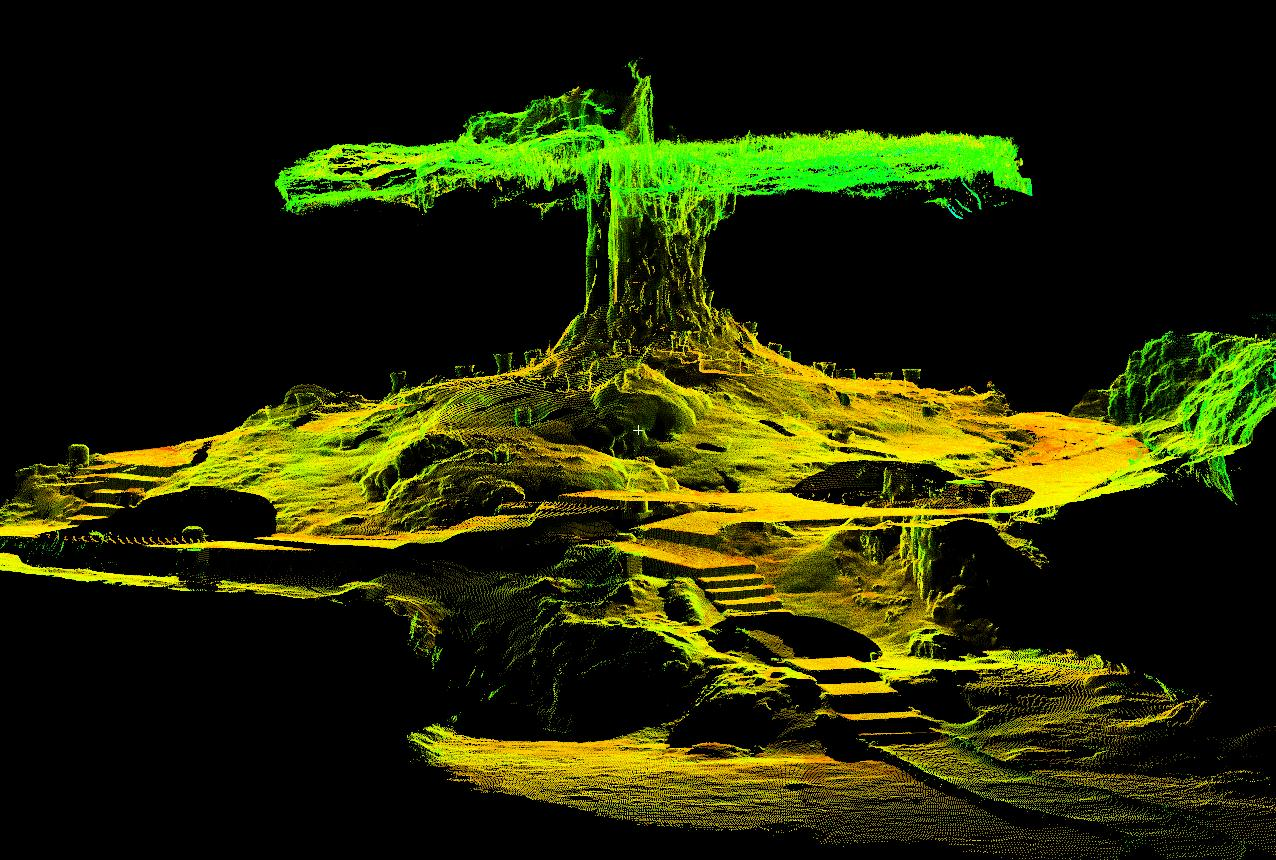
Composite laser scan image of Chichen Itza's Cave of Balankanche, showing how the shape of its great limestone column is strongly evocative of the World Tree in Maya mythological belief systems, data from a National Science Foundation/CyArk research partnership

Approximately 4 km (2.5 mi) south east of the Chichen Itza archeological zone are a network of sacred caves known as Balankanche (Spanish: Gruta de Balankanche), Balamkaʼancheʼ in Yucatec Maya). In the caves, a large selection of ancient pottery and idols may be seen still in the positions where they were left in pre-Columbian times.

The location of the cave has been well known in modern times. Edward Thompson and Alfred Tozzer visited it in 1905. A.S. Pearse and a team of biologists explored the cave in 1932 and 1936. E. Wyllys Andrews IV also explored the cave in the 1930s. Edwin Shook and R.E. Smith explored the cave on behalf of the Carnegie Institution in 1954, and dug several trenches to recover potsherds and other artifacts. Shook determined that the cave had been inhabited over a long period, at least from the Preclassic to the post-conquest era.

On 15 September 1959, José Humberto Gómez, a local guide, discovered a false wall in the cave. Behind it he found an extended network of caves with significant quantities of undisturbed archeological remains, including pottery and stone-carved censers, stone implements and jewelry. INAH converted the cave into an underground museum, and the objects after being catalogued were returned to their original place so visitors can see them in situ.

=== Architectural materials and preservation ===
Recent gamma-ray spectrometry analyses of the building stone material of the North Temple of the Great Ball Court in 2025 revealed important aspects about what materials were used during its construction, and how the deterioration process of progressing. Measurements during this study show that the limestone blocks used to build the structure are exhibiting more weathering and degradation compared to geological outcrops nearby. In this same study, analyses showed higher levels of natural radiation in local outcrops compared to the stones used in the North Temple, showing how geochemical methodologies can be used to determine how the architecture of constructed monuments can be preserved, and to predict how they will deteriorate over time.

== Great Museum of Chichen Itza ==
The Great Museum of Chichen Itza is an archaeological space inaugurated on 28 February 2024, located in the municipality of Tinum, Yucatán. It is part of the Visitor Attention Center (Catvi) and houses over 1,000 pieces, including 400 originals from various institutions and recent findings from the Maya Train project.

The museum offers a journey through the history of Chichen Itza through 14 thematic axes, highlighting the Sacred Cenote Room, which features a multimedia recreation of this ceremonial site. It also displays sculptures of Chac Mool, a stone table with reliefs of captives, and offerings discovered in the sacbeo'ob (Maya roads).

With 3,400 m^{2} of space, the venue includes exhibition halls, workshops, conferences, and a gastronomic center promoting the Mayan language. Its location allows access to tourists arriving at the Chichén Itzá railway station of the Tren Maya.

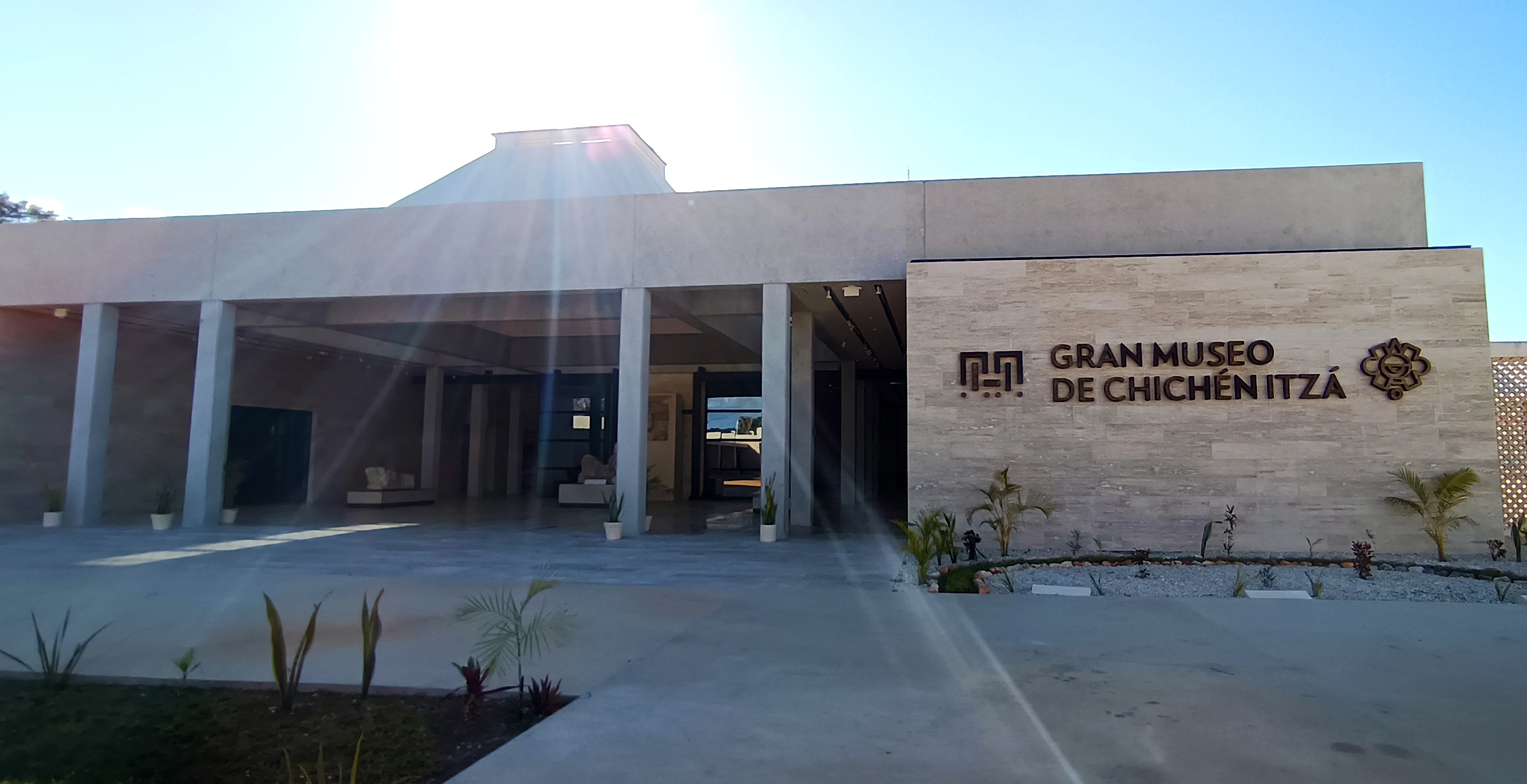
Entrance of the Great Museum of Chichen Itza

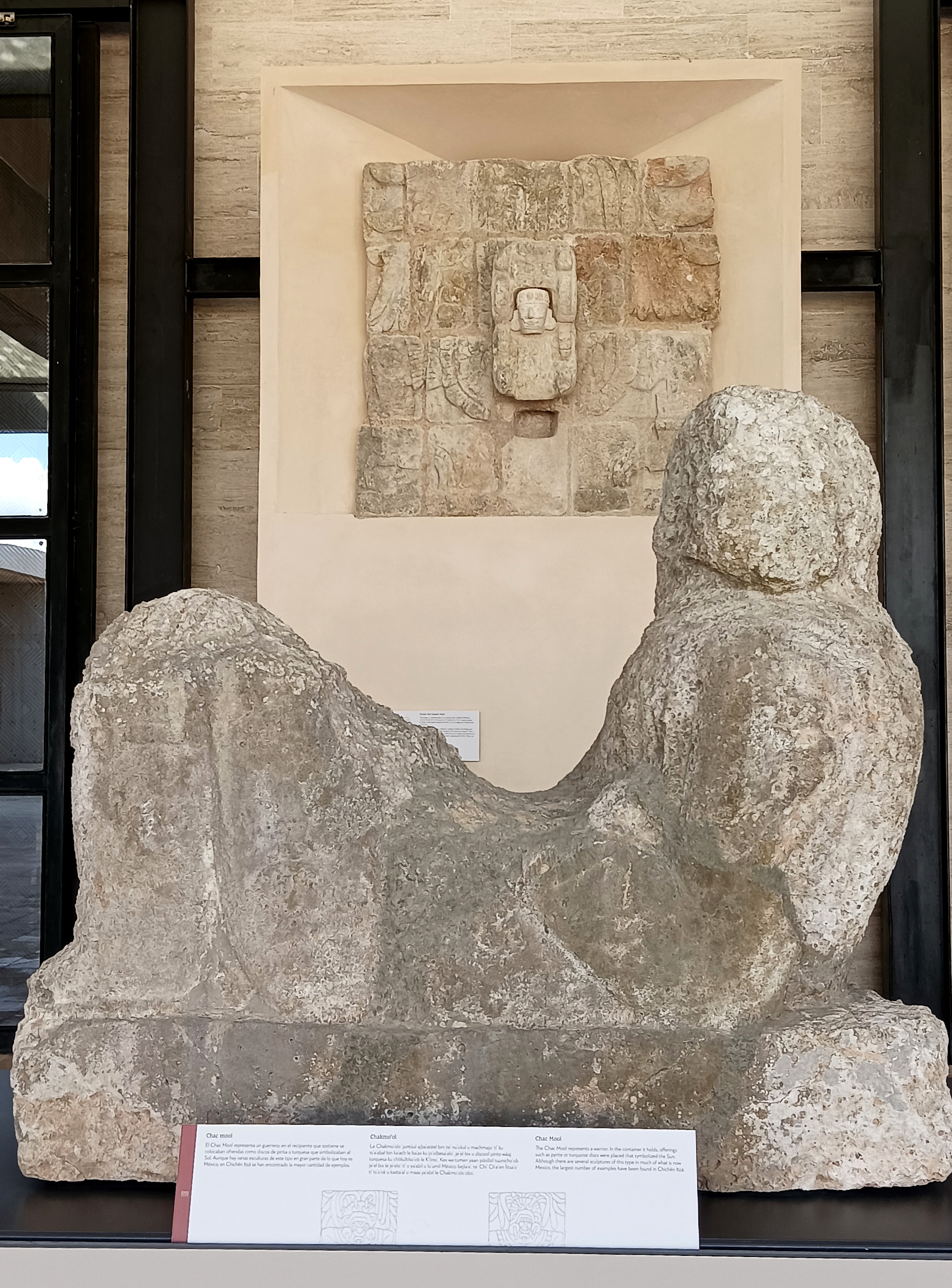
Chac Mool sculpture at the entrance of the museum

== Tourism ==
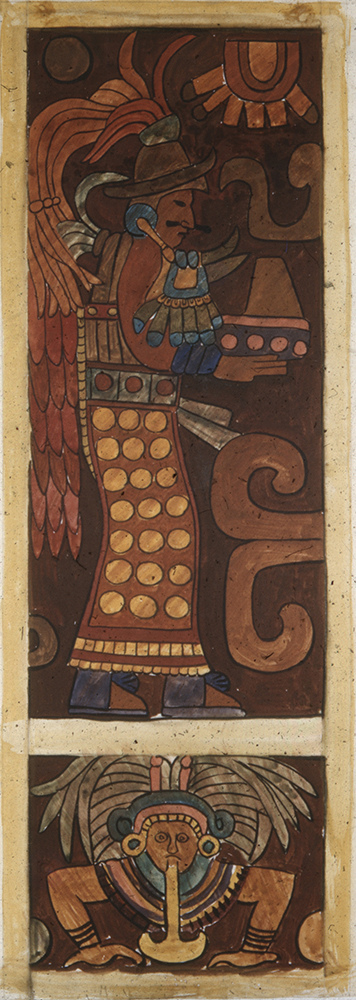
1938 painting of one of the reliefs found on lower terrace columns of the Temple of the Warriors, by Octavio Medellin

Chichen Itza is one of the most visited archeological sites in Mexico; in 2025 it was estimated to have received 9.9 million visitors.

Tourism has been a factor at Chichen Itza for more than a century. John Lloyd Stephens, who popularized the Maya Yucatán in the public's imagination with his book Incidents of Travel in Yucatan, inspired many to make a pilgrimage to Chichen Itza. Even before the book was published, Benjamin Norman and Baron Emanuel von Friedrichsthal traveled to Chichén after meeting Stephens, and both published the results of what they found. Friedrichsthal was the first to photograph Chichen Itza, using the recently invented daguerreotype.

After Edward Thompson in 1894 purchased the Hacienda Chichén, which included Chichen Itza, he received a constant stream of visitors. In 1910 he announced his intention to construct a hotel on his property, but abandoned those plans, probably because of the Mexican Revolution.

In the early 1920s, a group of Yucatecans, led by writer/photographer Francisco Gómez Rul, began working toward expanding tourism to Yucatán. They urged Governor Felipe Carrillo Puerto to build roads to the more famous monuments, including Chichen Itza. In 1923, Governor Carrillo Puerto officially opened the highway to Chichen Itza. Gómez Rul published one of the first guidebooks to Yucatán and the ruins.

Gómez Rul's son-in-law, Fernando Barbachano Peón (a grandnephew of former Yucatán Governor Miguel Barbachano), started Yucatán's first official tourism business in the early 1920s. He began by meeting passengers who arrived by steamship at Progreso, the port north of Mérida, and persuading them to spend a week in Yucatán, after which they would catch the next steamship to their next destination. In his first year Barbachano Peón reportedly was only able to convince seven passengers to leave the ship and join him on a tour. In the mid-1920s Barbachano Peón persuaded Edward Thompson to sell 5 acres (20,000 m^{2}) next to Chichén for a hotel. In 1930, the Mayaland Hotel opened, just north of the Hacienda Chichén, which had been taken over by the Carnegie Institution.

In 1944, Barbachano Peón purchased all of the Hacienda Chichén, including Chichen Itza, from the heirs of Edward Thompson. Around that same time the Carnegie Institution completed its work at Chichen Itza and abandoned the Hacienda Chichén, which Barbachano turned into another seasonal hotel.

In 1972, Mexico enacted the Ley Federal Sobre Monumentos y Zonas Arqueológicas, Artísticas e Históricas (Federal Law over Monuments and Archeological, Artistic and Historic Sites) that put all the nation's pre-Columbian monuments, including those at Chichen Itza, under federal ownership. There were now hundreds, if not thousands, of visitors every year to Chichen Itza, and more were expected with the development of the Cancún resort area to the east.

In the 1980s, Chichen Itza began to receive an influx of visitors on the day of the spring equinox. Today several thousand show up to see the light-and-shadow effect on the Temple of Kukulcán during which the feathered serpent appears to crawl down the side of the pyramid. (Note: See Quetzil Castaneda (1996) In The Museum of Maya Culture (University of Minnesota Press) for a book length study of tourism at Chichen, including a chapter on the equinox ritual. For a 90-minute ethnographic documentary of new age spiritualism at the Equinox see Jeff Himpele and Castaneda (1997)[Incidents of Travel in Chichen Itza] (Documentary Educational Resources).) Tour guides will also demonstrate a unique acoustical effect at Chichen Itza: a handclap before the staircase of the El Castillo pyramid will produce an echo that resembles the chirp of a bird, similar to that of the quetzal as investigated by Declercq.

Chichen Itza, a UNESCO World Heritage Site, is the second-most visited of Mexico's archeological sites. The archeological site draws many visitors from the popular tourist resorts in Cancún, who make a day trip on tour buses.

In 2007, Chichen Itza's Temple of Kukulcán (El Castillo) was named one of the New Seven Wonders of the World after a worldwide vote. Despite the fact that the vote was sponsored by a commercial enterprise, and that its methodology was criticized, the vote was embraced by government and tourism officials in Mexico who projected that as a result of the publicity the number of tourists to Chichén would double by 2012. (Note: Figure is attributed to Francisco López Mena, director of the Consejo de Promoción Turística de México (CPTM – Council for the Promotion of Mexican Tourism).) The ensuing publicity re-ignited debate in Mexico over the ownership of the site, which culminated on 29 March 2010 when the state of Yucatán purchased the land upon which the most recognized monuments rest from owner Hans Juergen Thies Barbachano.

INAH, which manages the site, has closed a number of monuments to public access. While visitors can walk around them, they can no longer climb them or go inside their chambers. Climbing access to El Castillo was closed after an 80-year-old American woman fell to her death in January 2006.

== Photograph gallery ==
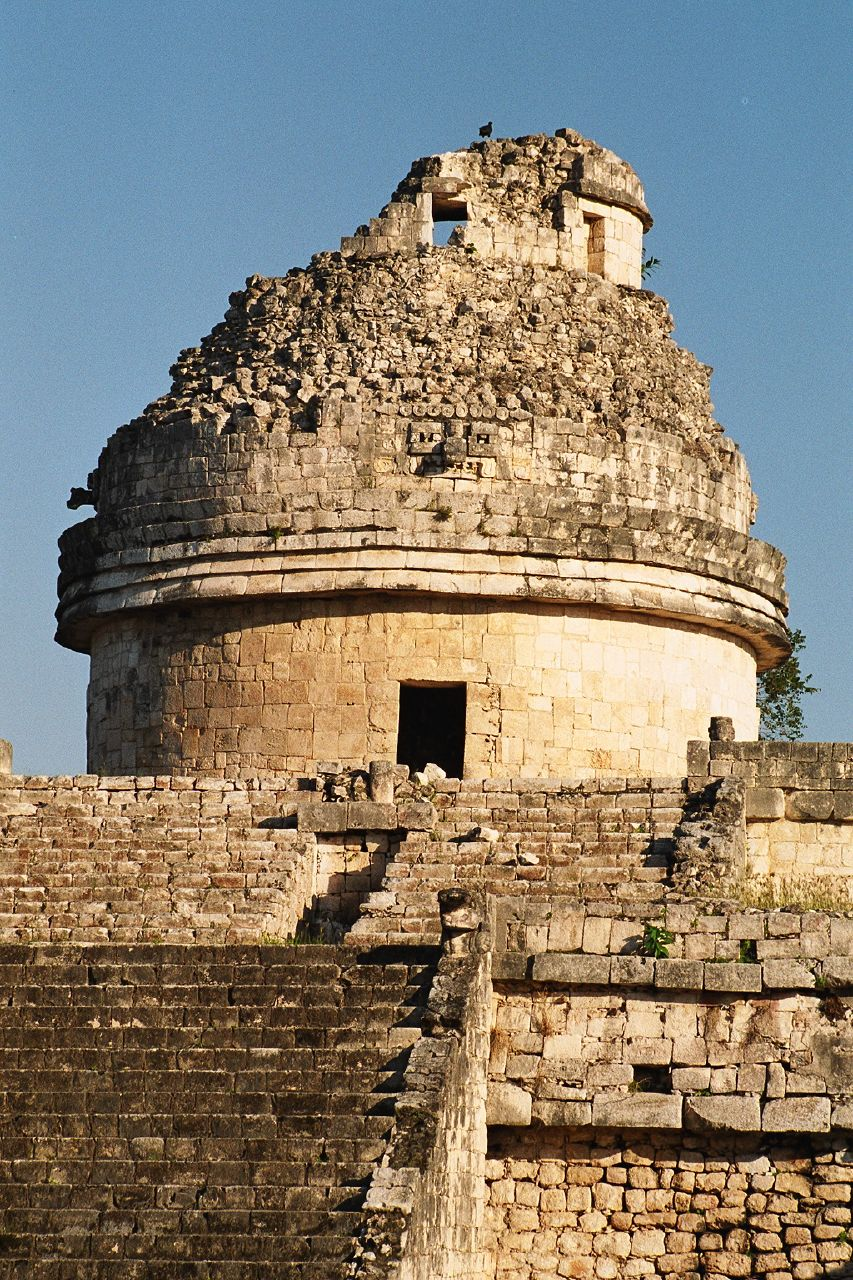
El Caracol, observatory of Chichen Itza

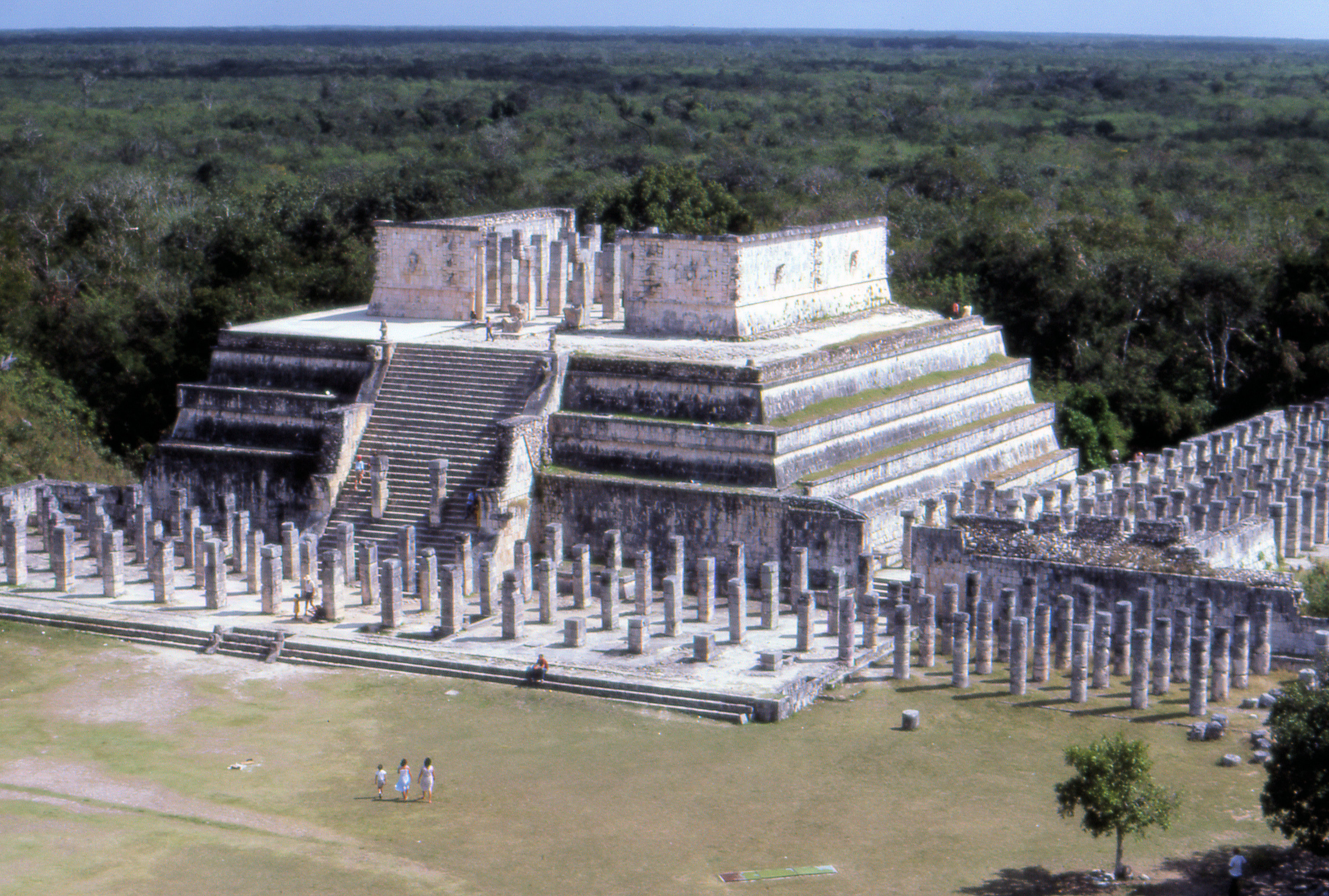
Temple of the Warriors in 1986. The Temple of the Big Tables, immediately to the left, was unrestored at that time.

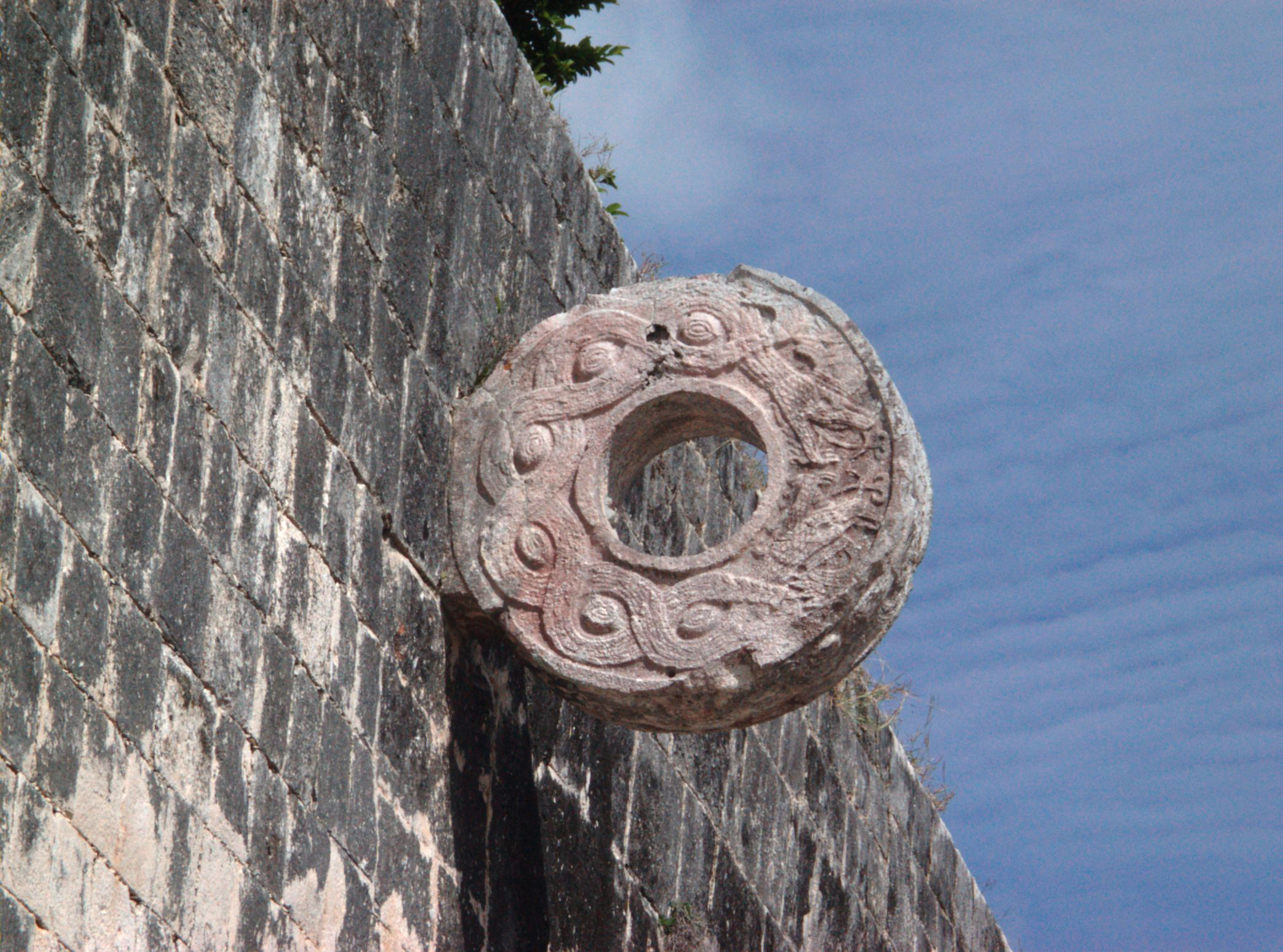
Stone Ring located 9 m (30 ft) above the floor of the Great Ballcourt

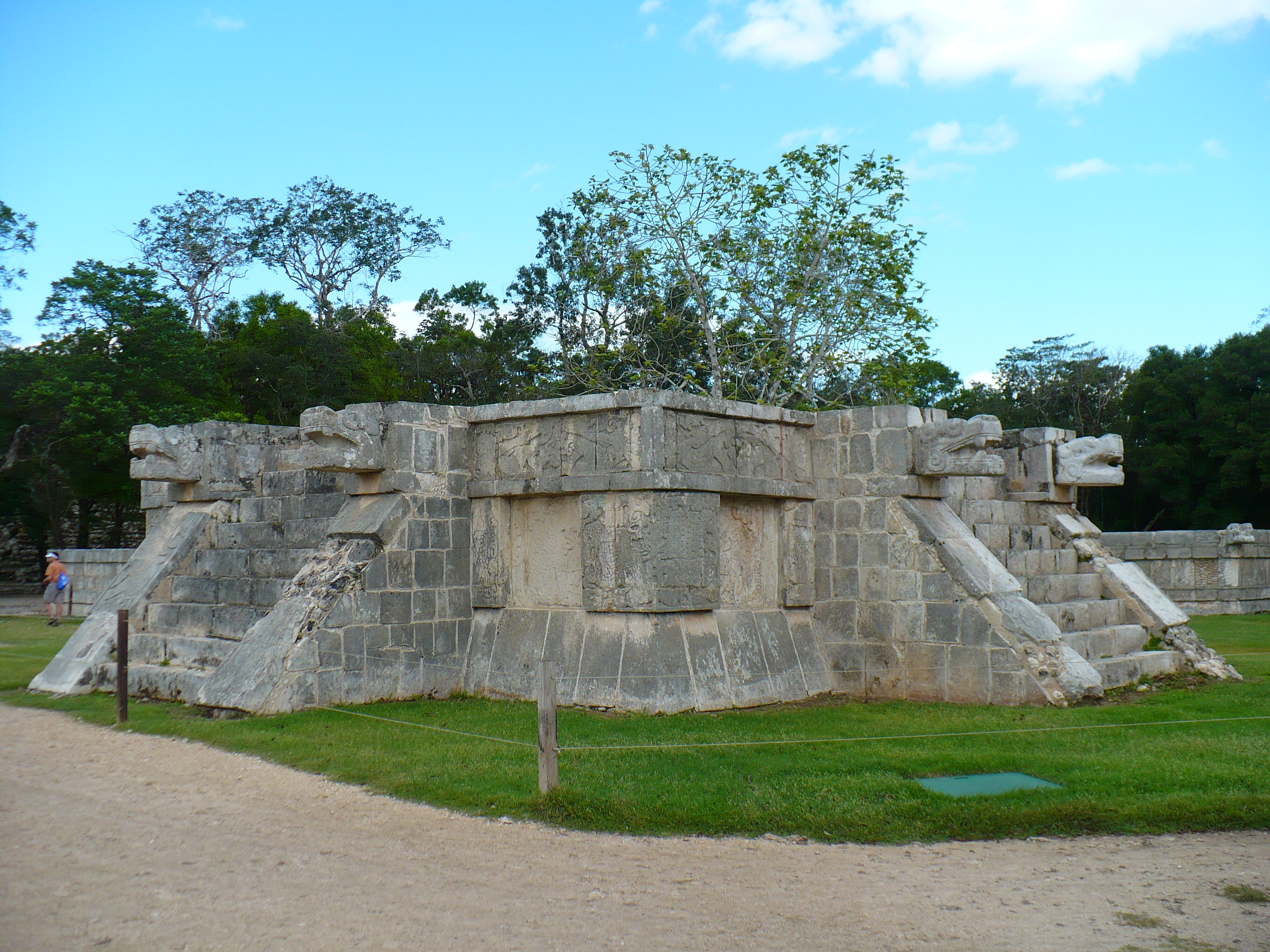
Platform of Venus in the Great Plaza

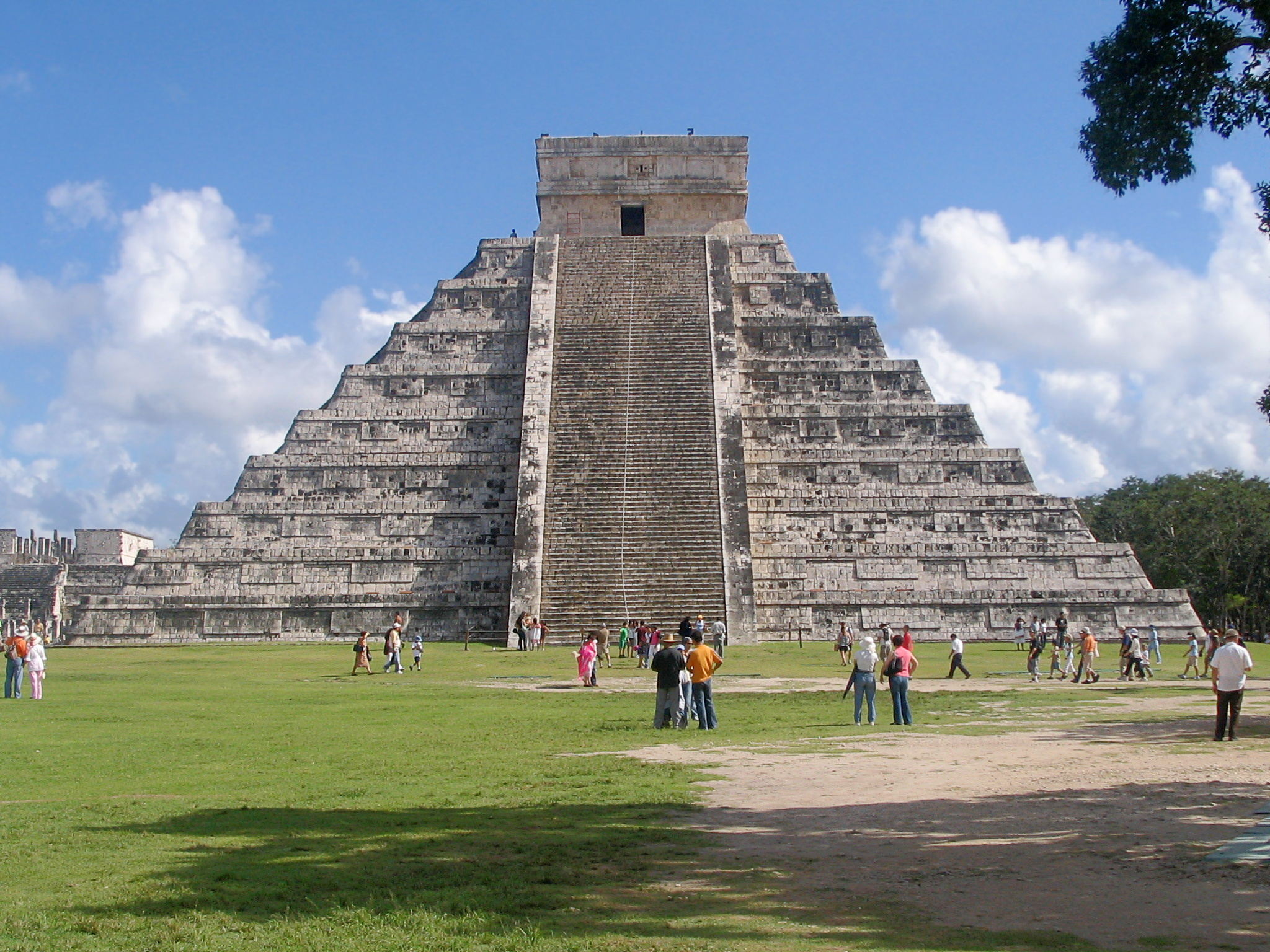
Kukulcán pyramid

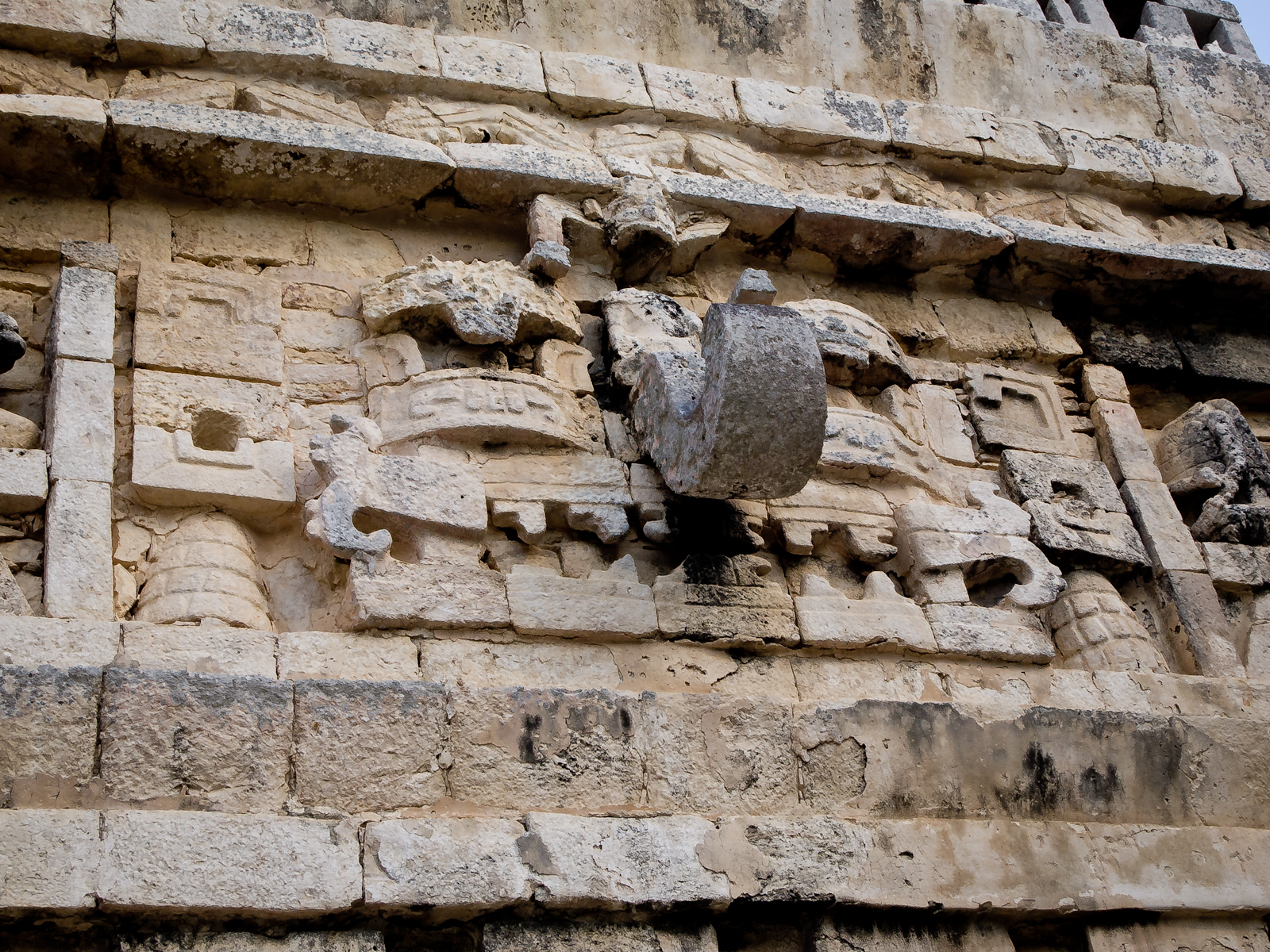
Mosaic mask on the western face of La Iglesia

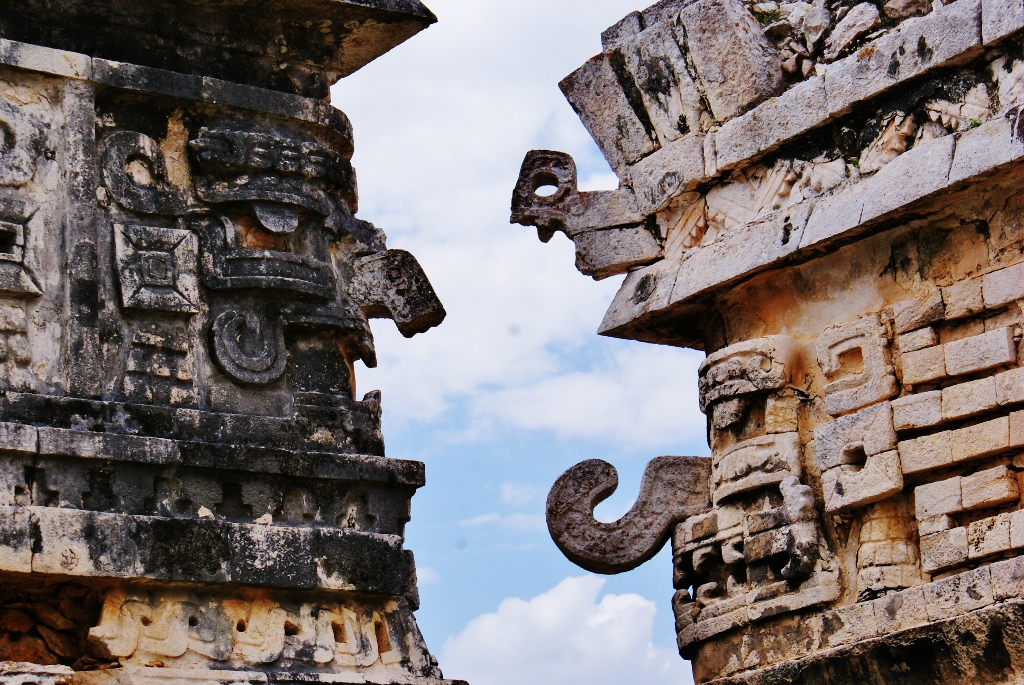
Elaborate mosaic masks

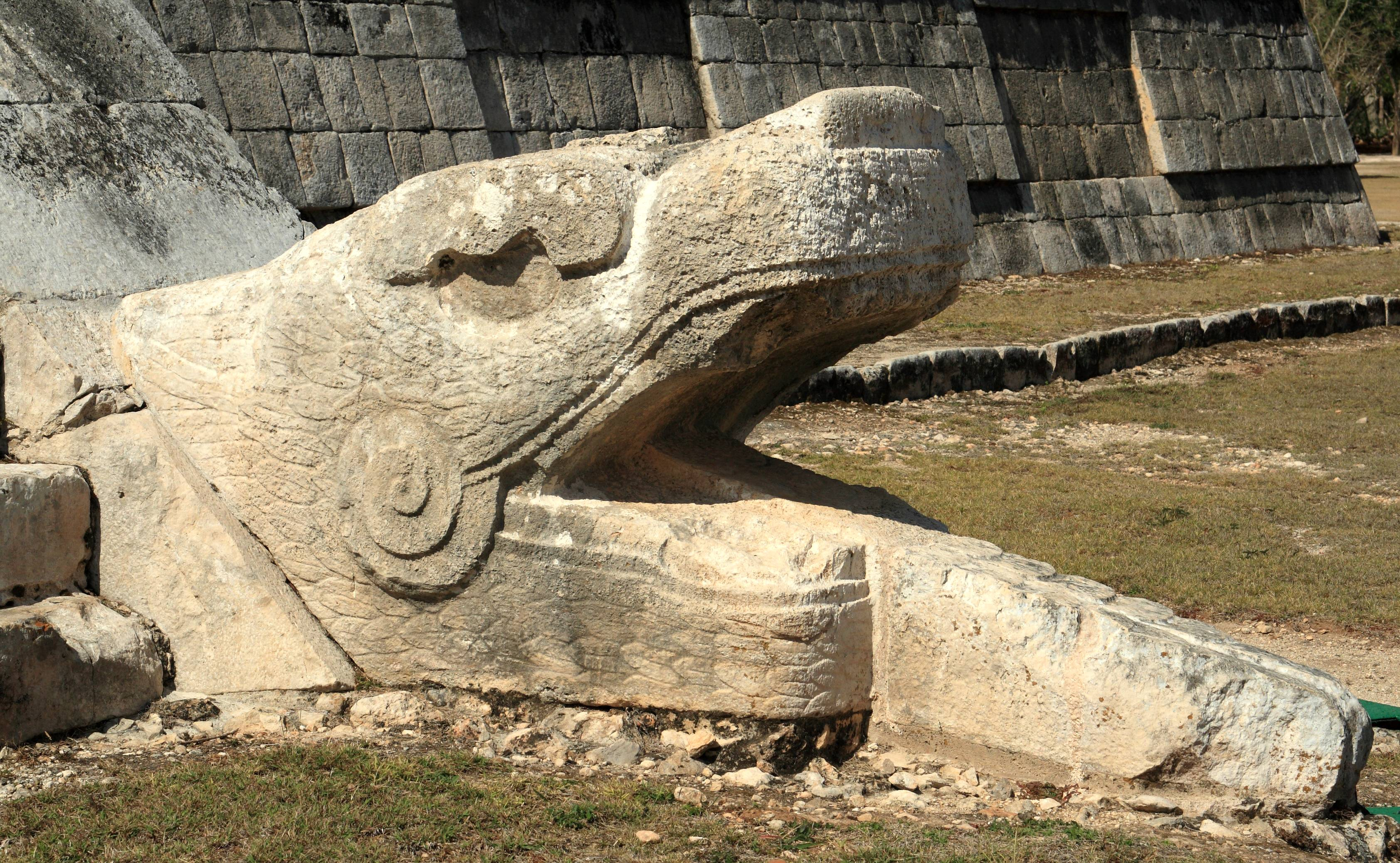
A feathered serpent sculpture at the base of one of the stairways of Kukulcán (El Castillo)

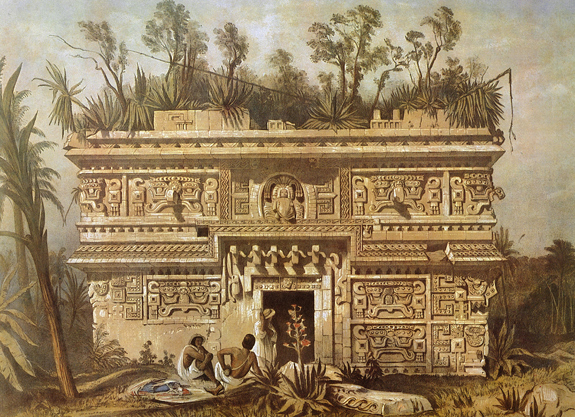
Las Monjas (Chichen Itza) in 1843 by Frederick Catherwood

== See also ==
- Chichen Itza railway station
- Chichen Itza International Airport
- Asteroid 100456 Chichen Itza
- List of archeoastronomical sites sorted by country
- List of Mesoamerican pyramids
- Maya–Toltec controversy at Chichen Itza
- Tikal
- Uxmal

== Bibliography ==
- Andrews, Anthony P.; E. Wyllys Andrews V.; Fernando Robles Castellanos (January 2003). "The Northern Maya Collapse and its Aftermath". Ancient Mesoamerica. 14 (1). New York: Cambridge University Press: 151–156. doi:10.1017/S095653610314103X. ISSN 0956-5361. OCLC 88518111. S2CID 162992099.
- Andrews, E. Wyllys IV (1961). "Excavations at the Gruta De Balankanche, 1959 (Appendix)". Preliminary Report on the 1959–60 Field Season National Geographic Society – Tulane University Dzibilchaltun Program: with grants in aid from National Science Foundation and American Philosophical Society. Middle American Research Institute Miscellaneous Series No 11. New Orleans: Middle American Research Institute, Tulane University. pp. 28–31. OCLC 5628735.
- Andrews, E. Wyllys IV (1970). Balancanche: Throne of the Tiger Priest. Middle American Research Institute Publication No 32. New Orleans: Middle American Research Institute, Tulane University. ISBN 0-939238-36-5. OCLC 639140.
- de Anda Alanís, Guillermo (2007). "Sacrifice and Ritual Body Mutilation in Postclassical Maya Society: Taphonomy of the Human Remains from Chichén Itzá's Cenote Sagrado". In Vera Tiesler; Andrea Cucina (eds.). New Perspectives on Human Sacrifice and Ritual Body Treatments in Ancient Maya Society. Interdisciplinary Contributions to Archaeology. Michael Jochim (series ed.). New York: Springer Verlag. pp. 190–208. ISBN 978-0-387-48871-4. ISSN 1568-2722. OCLC 81452956.
- Aveni, Anthony F. (1997). Stairways to the Stars: Skywatching in Three Great Ancient Cultures. New York: John Wiley & Sons. ISBN 0-471-15942-5. OCLC 35559005.
- Ball, Philip (14 December 2004). "News: Mystery of 'chirping' pyramid decoded". Nature News. doi:10.1038/news041213-5.
- Barquera, Rodrigo (June 2024). "Ancient genomes reveal insights into ritual life at Chichén Itzá". Nature. 630 (8018): 912–919. Bibcode:2024Natur.630..912B. doi:10.1038/s41586-024-07509-7. PMC 11208145. PMID 38867041.
- Barrera Vásquez, Alfredo (1980). Bastarrachea Manzano, Juan Ramón; Brito Sansores, William (eds.). Diccionario maya Cordemex: maya-español, español-maya. with collaborations by Refugio Vermont Salas, David Dzul Góngora, and Domingo Dzul Poot. Mérida, Mexico: Ediciones Cordemex. OCLC 7550928. (in Spanish and Yucatec Maya)
- Beyer, Hermann (1937). Studies on the Inscriptions of Chichen Itza (PDF). Contributions to American Archaeology, No.21. Washington D.C.: Carnegie Institution of Washington. OCLC 3143732. Archived from the original (PDF) on 11 March 2003.
- Boffil Gómez, Luis A. (30 March 2010). "Yucatán compra 80 has en la zona de Chichén Itzá" [Yucatán buys 80 hectares in the Chichen Itza zone]. La Jornada (in Spanish). Mexico City: DEMOS, Desarollo de Medios, S.A. de C.V.
- Boot, Erik (2005). Continuity and Change in Text and Image at Chichen Itza, Yucatan, Mexico: A Study of the Inscriptions, Iconography, and Architecture at a Late Classic to Early Postclassic Maya Site. CNWS Publications no. 135. Leiden, The Netherlands: CNWS Publications. ISBN 90-5789-100-X. OCLC 60520421.
- Breglia, Lisa (2006). Monumental Ambivalence: The Politics of Heritage. Austin: University of Texas Press. ISBN 978-0-292-71427-4. OCLC 68416845.
- Brunhouse, Robert (1971). Sylvanus Morley and the World of the Ancient Mayas. Norman, OK: University of Oklahoma Press. ISBN 978-0-8061-0961-9. OCLC 208428.
- Cano, Olga (January–February 2002). "Chichén Itzá, Yucatán (Guía de viajeros)". Arqueología Mexicana (in Spanish). IX (53). Mexico: Editorial Raíces: 80–87. ISSN 0188-8218. OCLC 29789840.
- Castañeda, Quetzil E. (1996). In the Museum of Maya Culture: Touring Chichén Itzá. Minneapolis, MN: University of Minnesota Press. ISBN 0-8166-2672-3. OCLC 34191010.
- Castañeda, Quetzil E. (May 2005). "On the Tourism Wars of Yucatán: Tíichʼ, the Maya Presentation of Heritage". Anthropology News. 46 (5). Arlington, VA: American Anthropological Association: 8–9. doi:10.1525/an.2005.46.5.8.2. ISSN 1541-6151. OCLC 42453678. Archived from the original (Reprinted online as "Tourism "Wars" in the Yucatán", AN Commentaries) on 11 October 2007.
- Chamberlain, Robert S. (1948). The Conquest and Colonization of Yucatán 1517–1550. Washington D.C.: Carnegie Institution of Washington. OCLC 42251506.
- Charnay, Désiré (1886). "Reis naar Yucatán". De Aarde en haar Volken, 1886 (in Dutch). Haarlem, Netherlands: Kruseman & Tjeenk Willink. OCLC 12339106. Project Gutenberg etext reproduction [#13346].
- Charnay, Désiré (1887). Ancient Cities of the New World: Being Voyages and Explorations in Mexico and Central America from 1857–1882. J. Gonino and Hellen S. Conant (trans.). New York: Harper & Brothers. OCLC 2364125.
- Chavez, Rene; et al. (2015). A Special ERT-3D Array Carried Out to Investigate the Subsoil of the Pyramid El Castillo, Chichen Itza, Mexico. Tejero A., Cifuentes-Nava G. and Hernandez-Quintero E. Turin, Italy: Near Surface Geoscience 2015 - 21st European Meeting of Environmental and Engineering Geophysics.
- Cirerol Sansores, Manuel (1948). "Chi Cheen Itsa": Archaeological Paradise of America. Mérida, Mexico: Talleres Graficos del Sudeste. OCLC 18029834.
- Clendinnen, Inga (2003). Ambivalent Conquests: Maya and Spaniard in Yucatán, 1517–1570. New York: Cambridge University Press. ISBN 0-521-37981-4. OCLC 50868309.
- Cobos, Rafael. "Chichén Itzá", in Davíd Carrasco (ed). The Oxford Encyclopedia of Mesoamerican Cultures. Oxford University Press, 2001. ISBN 9780195188431
- Cobos Palma, Rafael (2005) [2004]. "Chichén Itzá: Settlement and Hegemony During the Terminal Classic Period". In Arthur A. Demarest; Prudence M. Rice; Don S. Rice (eds.). The Terminal Classic in the Maya Lowlands: Collapse, Transition, and Transformation (paperback ed.). Boulder, CO: University Press of Colorado. pp. 517–544. ISBN 0-87081-822-8. OCLC 61719499.
- Coe, Michael D. (1987). The Maya (4th edition, revised ed.). London and New York: Thames & Hudson. ISBN 0-500-27455-X. OCLC 15895415.
- Coe, Michael D. (1999). The Maya. Ancient peoples and places series (6th edition, fully revised and expanded ed.). London / New York City: Thames & Hudson. ISBN 0-500-28066-5. OCLC 59432778.
- Coggins, Clemency Chase (1984). Cenote of Sacrifice: Maya Treasures from the Sacred Well at Chichen Itza. Austin, TX: University of Texas Press. ISBN 0-292-71098-4.
- Coggins, Clemency Chase (1992). Artifacts from the Cenote of Sacrifice, Chichén Itzá, Yucatán: Textiles, Basketry, Stone, Bone, Shell, Ceramics, Wood, Copal, Rubber, Other Organic Materials, and Mammalian Remains. Cambridge, MA: Peabody Museum of Archaeology and Ethnology, Harvard University; distributed by Harvard University Press. ISBN 0-87365-694-6. OCLC 26913402.
- Colas, Pierre R.; Voss, Alexander (2006). "A Game of Life and Death – The Maya Ball Game". In Nikolai Grube (ed.). Maya: Divine Kings of the Rain Forest. Eva Eggebrecht and Matthias Seidel (assistant eds.). Cologne, Germany: Könemann. pp. 186–191. ISBN 978-3-8331-1957-6. OCLC 71165439.
- Cucina, Andrea; Vera Tiesler (2007). "New perspectives on human sacrifice and postsacrifical body treatments in ancient Maya society: Introduction". In Vera Tiesler; Andrea Cucina (eds.). New Perspectives on Human Sacrifice and Ritual Body Treatments in Ancient Maya Society. Interdisciplinary Contributions to Archaeology. Michael Jochim (series ed.). New York: Springer. pp. 1–13. ISBN 978-0-387-48871-4. ISSN 1568-2722. OCLC 81452956.
- Demarest, Arthur (2004). Ancient Maya: The Rise and Fall of a Rainforest Civilization. Case Studies in Early Societies, No. 3. Cambridge: Cambridge University Press. ISBN 0-521-59224-0. OCLC 51438896.
- Diario de Yucatán (3 March 2006). "Fin a una exención para los mexicanos: Pagarán el día del equinoccio en la zona arqueológica" [End to an exemption for Mexicans: They will have to pay entry to the archaeological zone on the equinox]. Diario de Yucatán (in Spanish). Mérida, Yucatán: Compañía Tipográfica Yucateca, S.A. de C.V. OCLC 29098719.
- EFE (29 June 2007). "Chichén Itzá podría duplicar visitantes en 5 años si es declarada maravilla" [Chichen Itza could double visitors in 5 years if declared wonder] (in Spanish). Madrid, Spain. Agencia EFE, S.A.
- Freidel, David. "Yaxuna Archaeological Survey: A Report of the 1988 Field Season" (PDF). Foundation for the Advancement of Mesoamerican Studies.
- Fry, Steven M. (2009). "The Casa Colorada Ball Court: INAH Turns Mounds into Monuments". americanegypt.com. Mystery Lane Press. Archived from the original on 19 December 2010.
- Gallardo, Alfonso (March 2023). "Movientos Poclacionales del Clasico Terminal en Chichen Itza, a Partir de la Morfologia Dental de un Groupo de Ninos Sacrificados". Ancient Mesoamerica. 34 (2). Cambridge University Press: 545–562. doi:10.1017/S0956536120000528.
- García-Salgado, Tomás (2010). "The Sunlight Effect of the Kukulcán Pyramid or The History of a Line" (PDF). Nexus Network Journal.
- Gobierno del Estado de Yucatán (2007). "Municipios de Yucatán: Tinum" (in Spanish). Mérida, Yucatán: Gobierno del Estado de Yucatán. Archived from the original on 3 January 2012.
- Himpele, Jeffrey D. and Quetzil E. Castañeda (Filmmakers and Producers) (1997). Incidents of Travel in Chichén Itzá: A Visual Ethnography (Documentary (VHS and DVD)). Watertown, MA: Documentary Educational Resources. OCLC 38165182. Archived from the original on 29 November 2007.
- Koch, Peter O. (2006). The Aztecs, the Conquistadors, and the Making of Mexican Culture. Jefferson, NC: McFarland & Co. ISBN 0-7864-2252-1. OCLC 61362780.
- Kowalski, Jeff K. (1985). "Painted architecture in the Northern Maya Area". Painted Architecture and Polychrome Monumental Sculpture in Mesoamerica: A Symposium at Dumbarton Oaks, 10th to 11th October 1981. Jefferson, NC: Dumbarton Oaks Research Library and Collection. pp. 51–82. ISBN 0-884-02142-4. OCLC 611687168.
- Kurjack, Edward B.; Maldonado C., Ruben; Greene Robertson, Merle (1991). "Ballcourts of the Northern Maya Lowlands". In Vernon Scarborough; David R. Wilcox (eds.). The Mesoamerican Ballgame. Tucson, AZ: University of Arizona Press. pp. 145–159. ISBN 0-8165-1360-0. OCLC 51873028.
- de Landa, Diego (1937). William Gates (trans.) (ed.). Yucatan Before and After the Conquest. Baltimore, MD: The Maya Society. OCLC 253690044.
- Luxton, Richard N. (trans.) (1996). The book of Chumayel: the counsel book of the Yucatec Maya, 1539–1638. Walnut Creek, California: Aegean Park Press. ISBN 0-89412-244-4. OCLC 33849348.
- Madeira, Percy (1931). An Aerial Expedition to Central America (Reprint ed.). Philadelphia: University of Pennsylvania. OCLC 13437135.
- Masson, Marilyn (2006). "The Dynamics of Maturing Statehood in Postclassic Maya Civilization". In Nikolai Grube (ed.). Maya: Divine Kings of the Rain Forest. Eva Eggebrecht and Matthias Seidel (assistant eds.). Cologne, Germany: Könemann. pp. 340–353. ISBN 978-3-8331-1957-6. OCLC 71165439.
- Miller, Mary Ellen (1999). Maya Art and Architecture. London and New York: Thames & Hudson. ISBN 0-500-20327-X. OCLC 41659173.
- Morley, Sylvanus Griswold (1913). W. H. R. Rivers; A. E. Jenks; S. G. Morley (eds.). Archaeological Research at the Ruins of Chichen Itza, Yucatan. Reports upon the Present Condition and Future Needs of the Science of Anthropology. Washington, D.C.: Carnegie Institution of Washington. OCLC 562310877.
- Morris, Earl H. (1931). The Temple of the Warriors. New York: Charles Scribner's Sons.
- Osorio León, José (2006). "La presencia del Clásico Tardío en Chichen Itza (600–800/830 DC)" (PDF). In Laporte, J.P.; Arroyo, B.; Mejía, H. (eds.). XIX Simposio de Investigaciones Arqueológicas en Guatemala, 2005 (in Spanish). Guatemala City, Guatemala: Museo Nacional de Arqueología y Etnología. pp. 455–462. Archived from the original (PDF) on 14 September 2011.
- Palmquist, Peter E.; Kailbourn, Thomas R. (2000). Pioneer Photographers of the Far West: A Biographical Dictionary, 1840–1865. Stanford, CA: Stanford University Press. ISBN 0-8047-3883-1. OCLC 44089346.
- Pérez de Lara, Jorge (n.d.). "A Tour of Chichen Itza with a Brief History of the Site and its Archaeology". Mesoweb.
- Perry, Richard D., ed. (2001). Exploring Yucatan: A Traveler's Anthology. Santa Barbara, CA: Espadaña Press. ISBN 0-9620811-4-0. OCLC 48261466.
- Phillips, Charles (2007) [2006]. The Complete Illustrated History of the Aztecs & Maya: The definitive chronicle of the ancient peoples of Central America & Mexico - including the Aztec, Maya, Olmec, Mixtec, Toltec & Zapotec. London: Anness Publishing Ltd. ISBN 978-1-84681-197-5. OCLC 642211652.
- Piña Chan, Román (1993) [1980]. Chichén Itzá: La ciudad de los brujos del agua (in Spanish). Mexico City: Fondo de Cultura Económica. ISBN 968-16-0289-7. OCLC 7947748.
- Restall, Matthew (1998). Maya Conquistador. Boston, Massachusetts: Beacon Press. ISBN 978-0-8070-5506-9. OCLC 38746810.
- Roys, Ralph L. (trans.) (1967). The Book of Chilam Balam of Chumayel. Norman, OK: University of Oklahoma Press. OCLC 224990.
- Ruiz, Francisco Pérez. "Walled Compounds: An Interpretation of the Defensive System at Chichen Itza, Yucatan" (PDF). Foundation for the Advancement of Mesoamerican Studies.
- Schele, Linda; David Freidel (1990). A Forest of Kings: The Untold Story of the Ancient Maya (Reprint ed.). New York: Harper Perennial. ISBN 0-688-11204-8. OCLC 145324300.
- Schmidt, Peter J. (2007). "Birds, Ceramics, and Cacao: New Excavations at Chichén Itzá, Yucatan". In Jeff Karl Kowalski; Cynthia Kristan-Graham (eds.). Twin Tollans: Chichén Itzá, Tula, and the Epiclassic to Early Postclassic Mesoamerican World. Washington D.C.: Dumbarton Oaks Research Library & Collection: Distributed by Harvard University Press. ISBN 978-0-88402-323-4. OCLC 71243931.
- SECTUR (2006). Compendio Estadístico del Turismo en México 2006. Mexico City: Secretaría de Turismo (SECTUR).
- SECTUR (7 July 2007). "Boletín 069: Declaran a Chichén Itzá Nueva Maravilla del Mundo Moderno" (in Spanish). Mexico City: Secretaría de Turismo. Archived from the original on 17 March 2012.
- Sharer, Robert J.; Traxler, Loa P. (2006). The Ancient Maya (6th (fully revised) ed.). Stanford, CA: Stanford University Press. ISBN 0-8047-4817-9. OCLC 57577446.
- Thompson, J. Eric S. (1966) [1954]. The Rise and Fall of Maya Civilization. Norman, OK: University of Oklahoma Press. ISBN 0-8061-0301-9. OCLC 6611739.
- Tozzer, Alfred Marston; Glover Morrill Allen (1910). Animal figures in the Maya codices. Vol. 4 (Papers of the Peabody Museum of American Archaeology and Ethnology, Harvard University ed.). Cambridge, MA: The Museum. OCLC 2199473.
- Usborne, David (7 November 2007). "Mexican standoff: the battle of Chichen Itza". The Independent. Archived from the original on 9 January 2008.
- Voss, Alexander W.; Kremer, H. Juergen (2000). "Kʼakʼ-u-pakal, Hun-pik-tokʼ and the Kokom: The Political Organization of Chichén Itzá". In Pierre Robert Colas (ed.). The Sacred and the Profane: Architecture and Identity in the Maya Lowlands (proceedings of the 3rd European Maya Conference). 3rd European Maya Conference, University of Hamburg, November 1998. Markt Schwaben, Germany: Verlag Anton Saurwein. ISBN 3-931419-04-5. OCLC 47871840.
- Weeks, John M.; Jane A. Hill (2006). The Carnegie Maya: the Carnegie Institution of Washington Maya Research Program, 1913–1957. Boulder, CO: University Press of Colorado. ISBN 978-0-87081-833-2. OCLC 470645719.
- Willard, T.A. (1941). Kukulcan, the Bearded Conqueror: New Mayan Discoveries. Hollywood, California: Murray and Gee. OCLC 3491500.
