= Tozzer Library =

Anthropology and archaeology library at Harvard University

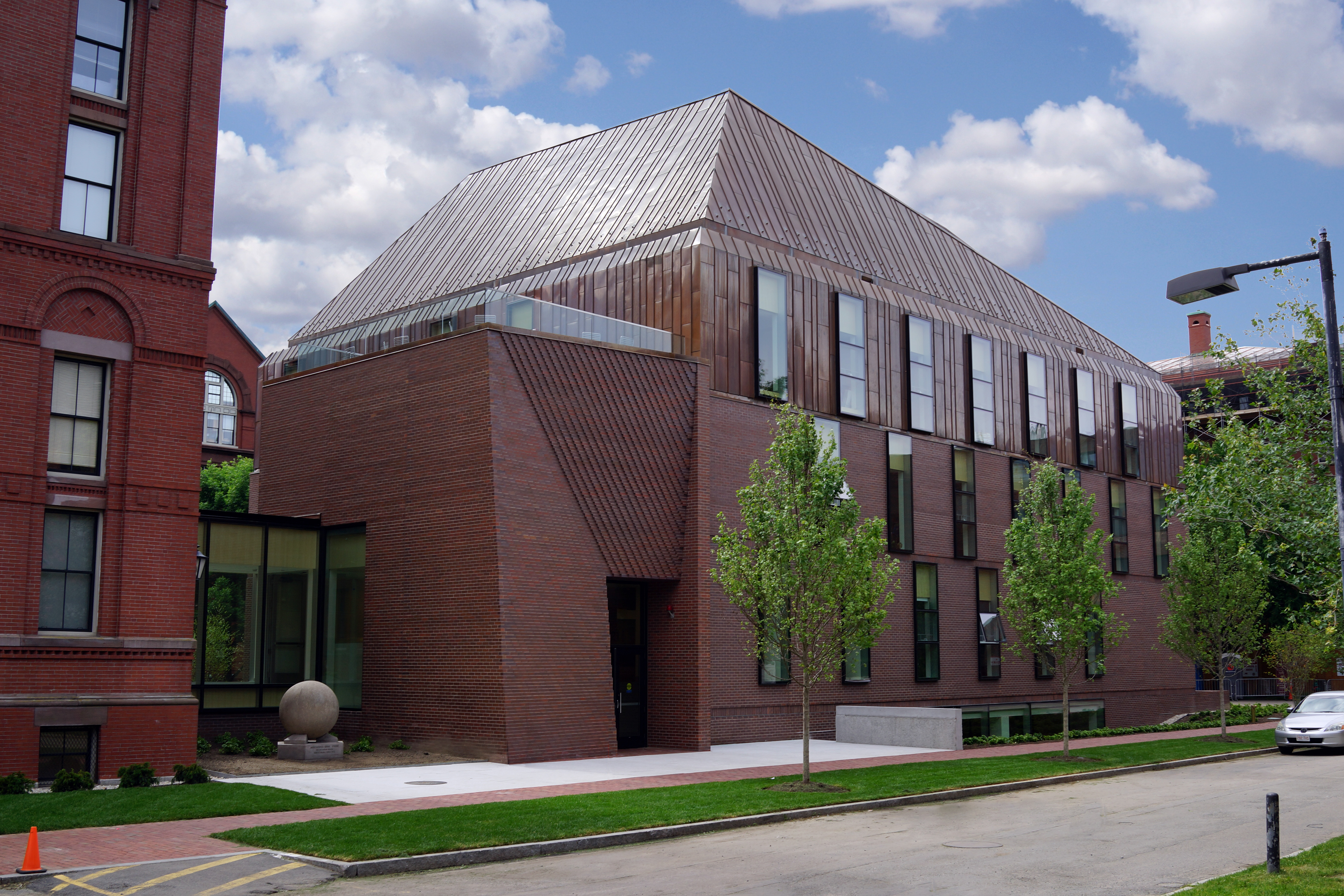
- Tozzer Library building exterior
- Location: 21 Divinity Ave Cambridge, MA 02138, United States
- Type: Academic
- Established: 1868
- Branch of: Harvard Library

Collection
- Items collected: Anthropology and Archaeology

Access and use
- Access requirements: Open to public

Other information
- Website: Tozzer Library

Tozzer Library is Harvard Library's primary source for all subfields of anthropology and archaeology. With over 250,000 volumes, Tozzer is home to one of the largest and most comprehensive anthropology and archaeology collections worldwide. The anthropology collections cover a wide span of regions across the globe, while the archaeology collections also range worldwide but focus heavily on archaeology of the Americas (Widener Library maintains Harvard's archaeology collections on Greece, Rome, and Egypt).

== History ==
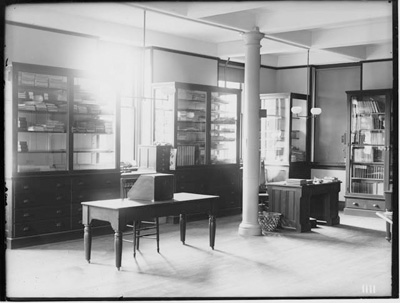
Peabody Museum Library, ca. 1893.

Tozzer Library is the oldest library in the United States specializing in all subfields of anthropology, ethnology, and archaeology. Originally founded as the library of Harvard University's Peabody Museum of Archaeology and Ethnology, the Library was first recognized as the Peabody Museum Library. The Museum was established in 1866 after George Peabody gifted $150,000 towards the acquisition and preservation of archaeological artifacts, as well as towards a physical building and professorship support. The Library was established a few years later, as the Museum's collections rapidly expanded. The very first book (Kaladlit okalluktualliait: kalâdlisut kablunâtudlo) added to the Library was recorded in 1868 by Jeffries Wyman (1814–1874), natural scientist and Peabody Museum's first curator. Since the Library was established as an appendage to the Peabody Museum, the book budget and collection grew relatively slowly in its early seminal years, and there were no full-time staff (Schmidt 1982). Books purchases were rare, and scholars were accustomed to depending on the collections of other libraries’ within Harvard (Weeks 1987). In 1880, the collection had reached approximately 1,000 volumes, most of which had been donated. Annual Reports during the first couple decades of the Library's history indicate an average annual expenditure of roughly $50. Wyman and his secretary, Jane Smith, used index cards to alphabetically catalogue the small collection (Currier 1949).

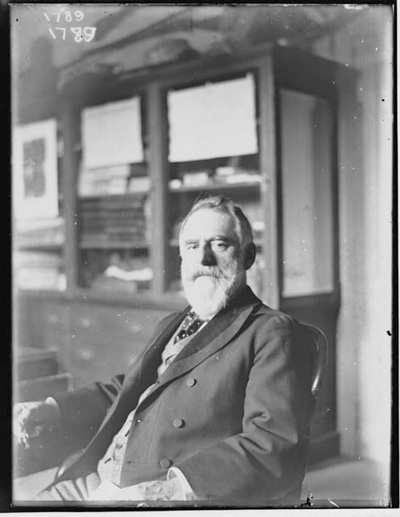
F.W. Putnam in the Peabody Museum

By the turn of the nineteenth century, the Peabody Museum's growing collections and scholarly publications had broadened in scope within the field and opened up opportunities for exchanges and gifts. Harvard archaeologist Charles P. Bowditch (1842–1921) was the largest contributor to the Peabody Museum during this period. He initiated many expeditions to Central America to study the Maya civilization and donated a substantial number of materials to the Peabody Museum and Library (Tozzer 1921). One notable example that Tozzer Library owns is the Bowditch-Gates Collection, which includes over 250 photographic reproductions of nearly every known unpublished manuscript and imprint in Mayan and Mexican languages. In addition to expeditions, Bowditch paved the way for a professorship, as well as continued research and publications under the Peabody Museum. In 1891, Frederic Ward Putnam (1839–1915), Peabody's first professor, led the first course in archaeology and ethnography of the US (Currier 1949).

In 1904, Harvard anthropology professor Roland B. Dixon (1875–1934) was appointed as the first librarian of the Peabody Museum Library (Schmidt 1982). The administrative accomplishments of Dixon, along with the wider scope of research and expeditions and expanding student body, led to substantial growth of the Peabody Museum and Library during the early twentieth century. Archaeological research of Central America and the American Southwest continued, and scholars also expanded their focus to areas of Africa and Asia. Publications grew in numbers and scope, resulting in wider recognition of the Peabody Museum and Library as leading players in the field and opening additional opportunities for research exchanges. Dixon was able to secure increased funding for collection development, new shelving, and a team of staff. He also created an index as part of the Library's card catalogue and developed a system of anthropological separate subject headings, boosting the Library's reputation as a specialized academic library. Dixon's card cataloguing and separate subject headings were used for many years, although they were revised and updated as anthropological terminology evolved throughout the years (Weeks 1987).

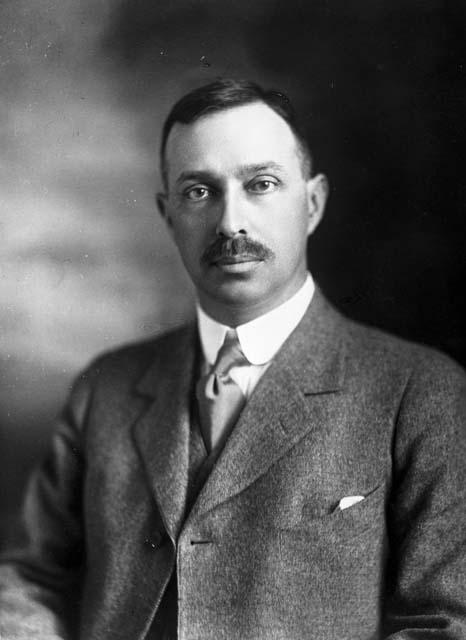
Roland B. Dixon

Dixon served as Librarian until his death in 1934 and was succeeded by Alfred M. Tozzer (1877–1954), Hudson Professor of Archaeology of Harvard University (Tozzer & Kroeber 1936). Tozzer continued in Dixon's footsteps, growing the Library's collections and using the cataloguing system that Dixon developed (Weeks 1987). Earlier in his career, Tozzer participated in several excavations to study the Maya civilization. He was part of a Peabody Museum-funded excavation team that was credited with discovering the Holmul ruins in 1910 (Tozzer 1913). Tozzer donated many of his field notes to the Library and contributed to cultivating its collections on Mesoamerica (Weeks 1987).

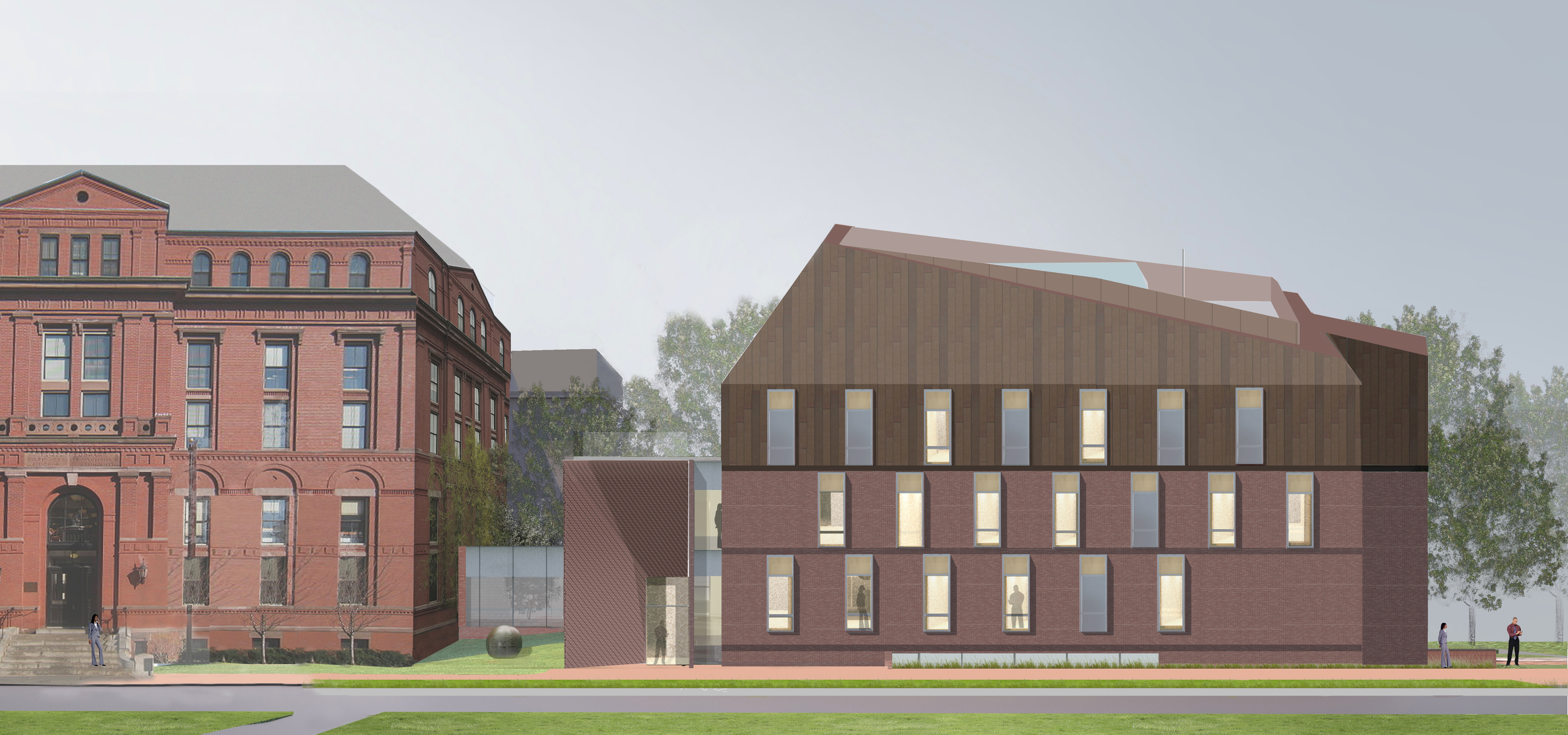
Architect's rendering of the Tozzer Library building

After Tozzer's retirement in 1947, Margaret Currier was appointed as the third Librarian but the first professional librarian to lead the Peabody Museum Library. By this time, the Library's collections had exceeded its physical location within the Museum, and plans were soon drafted for a building of its own. With the help of donations from the Tozzer family, among others, the new building underwent construction in 1973. The collections were moved to the newly renovated building in 1974, and the Peabody Museum Library was subsequently renamed to Tozzer Library, in honor of Alfred Tozzer (Weeks 1987).

Antonio Rodriguez-Buckingham served briefly as the fourth Librarian, from 1974 to 1977, and was then followed by Nancy J. Schmidt, professional librarian and educational anthropologist, from 1977 to 1984. From the conception of the Library until then, the Peabody Museum had been largely responsible for funding the Library's collection development and staff appointments. In 1979, however, Tozzer Library transitioned from the property of the Museum to Harvard College Library (HCL). This reorganization aligned library services and practices with those of HCL at large (Weeks 1987). Tozzer Library and the Peabody Museum remained closely connected and are still connected to this day.

In the early 1980s, Tozzer Library began entering bibliographic records into HOLLIS, Harvard's online library catalog, and in 1986, the Library completed the transition from card catalog to HOLLIS. The separate subject cataloguing system, originally devised by Roland B. Dixon, was also switched over to the widely used Library of Congress Subject Headings. Although the Library of Congress Subject Headings are now used widely throughout the field of anthropology, Dixon's original index is still a major resource for research in anthropology, as it represents over a century of publishing in anthropology and is still produced at Harvard. Because Dixon had begun indexing journals retrospectively, all the way to the conception of the field of anthropology, the Library's index has and continues to be one of the most comprehensive indexes of anthropology (Steins 2005). There is now an online database, Anthropological Literature (AL), for which users can explore citations to both print and digital journals.

The 1980s saw the turnover of a few different librarians: Sally Williams served as Acting Librarian from 1984 to 1985, followed by G. Edward Evans from 1985 to 1988, and then Lynne M. Schmelz, who was originally appointed in 1988. Schmelz served on and off through 2018, with the exceptions of Maija M. Lutz (Librarian from 1998 to 2004) and Janet L. Steins (Interim Librarian from 2009 to 2010). After Schmelz retired from Harvard in 2018, Susan L. Gilman became and is still the Librarian of Tozzer Library.

== Collections ==
Some notable rare and special collections at Tozzer Library include, but are not limited to:

- Bowditch-Gates Collection (unpublished manuscripts and imprints in Mayan and Mexican languages)
- Adolph F. Bandelier Collection (Native Americans of the Southwest)
- Henry O. Beyer Collection (history and ethnography of Philippine Islands)
- Jaroslav Pasternak Collection (Ukrainian archaeology)
- Field notes of Alfred M. Tozzer and Sylvanus Griswold Morley
- Personal papers of Cora Du Bois
- Field reports of expeditions led by Henry Field to Pakistan and the Middle East
- Personal libraries and notes of Harvard-affiliated anthropologists
- Dissertations and theses written by Harvard anthropology students

Tozzer Library also holds many personal libraries of notable scholars, including:

- L. Cabot Briggs
- William R. Bullard
- Hugh O'Neill Hencken
- Samuel K. Lothrop
- Jaroslav Pasternak
- George Grant Maccurdy
- Alfred M. Tozzer

Housed in its own building since 1974, the Library is located at 21 Divinity Avenue in Cambridge, MA and is open to the public. More information about hours and services can be found on Tozzer Library's homepage.
