= Alfred Tozzer =

American anthropologist (1877–1954)

Alfred Marston Tozzer
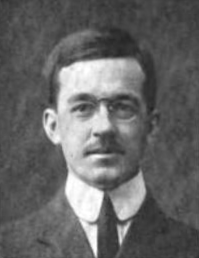
- Born: July 4, 1877; Lynn, Massachusetts
- Died: October 5, 1954 (aged 77); Cambridge, Massachusetts
- Known for: Maya civilization archaeology, Mayan language studies
- Scientific career
- Fields: Anthropologist; Archaeologist; University professor; Scholar

Alfred Marston Tozzer (July 4, 1877 – October 5, 1954) was an American anthropologist, archaeologist, linguist, and educator. His principal area of interest was Mesoamerican, especially Maya, studies.

== Early studies and career ==
Alfred Tozzer was born in Lynn, Massachusetts to Samuel Clarence (1846–1908) and Caroline (née Marston, 1847–1926) Tozzer, and graduated in anthropology from Harvard University in 1900. That summer he entered field as an assistant to Harvard's Roland Dixon to study American Indian languages of California. The following year he collected linguistic and ethnographic data on the Navajos living near Pueblo Bonito in New Mexico. From these experiences he published his first paper, which he presented at the Thirteenth International Congress of Americanists held in New York in 1902.

In December 1901, he won appointment as a traveling fellow for the Archaeological Institute of America. He spent several seasons in Yucatán conducting fieldwork among the Maya. He began at the Hacienda Chichén, owned by U.S. Consul to Yucatán Edward H. Thompson, a large plantation that included the ancient city of Chichen Itza. There he studied the Maya language and traveled the countryside collecting folk tales and oral histories. During one of his seasons at Chichen Itza he helped Thompson dredge the Cenote Sagrado; at the end of another, he carried artifacts to the Peabody Museum in his luggage.

In 1903, Tozzer traveled to Campeche and Chiapas to conduct research among the Lacandon Maya, and lived for several weeks in a small settlement on Lake Pethá, witnessing and even participating in their ceremonies. He returned there during the 1904 season. He wrote his PhD dissertation comparing the ceremonies of the Lacandone Maya with the Yucatecan Maya.

In the fall of 1904, he studied at Columbia University under Franz Boas and Adolph Bandelier. He spent one more season in Yucatán, Campeche and Chiapas, before settling at Harvard in the fall of 1905 as an assistant professor of anthropology.

== Transition to archaeologist ==
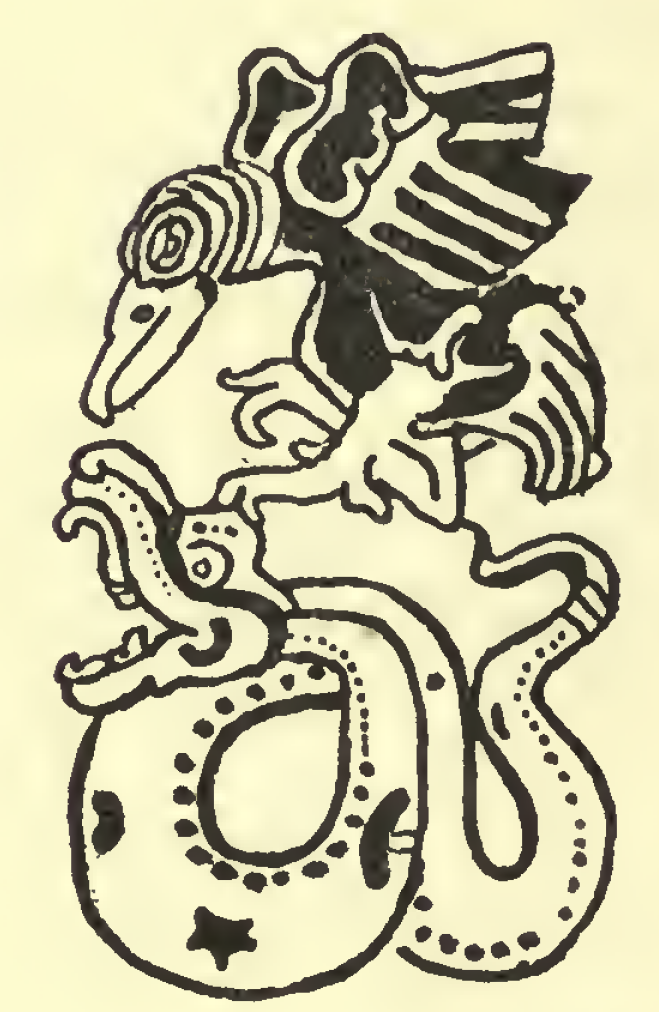
Black vulture and snake from a Maya codex

From the beginning of his professional career, Tozzer began to shift more to archaeology and away from ethnography. During his seasons at Chichen, he assisted Adela Breton with her copies of reliefs, and Thompson who was making paper molds. During his time with the Lacandons he discovered and explored ruins that today share the name of the Rio Tzendales. In the summer of 1907, he joined Dixon, Alfred Kidder and Sylvanus Morley on a purely archaeological expedition to Rito de los Frijoles in New Mexico (today part of Bandelier National Monument).

In 1910 he took a leave of absence from Harvard to lead his first expedition to the ruins of Tikal and Nakum on behalf of the university's Peabody Museum. On this trip Tozzer discovered the ruins of Holmul.

In 1914 Tozzer took another leave of absence to succeed Boas as director of the International School of American Archeology and Ethnology in Mexico. He arrived in Veracruz in time to witness the US Navy shelling of the city. He oversaw excavation of the Toltec site at Santiago Ahuitzotla. Once his term as director expired, he never ventured into the field again.

Tozzer eventually returned to Harvard where he would spend the remainder of his professional career, except for stints in the military. He served as a captain in the Air Service from 1917 to 1918. He served as a major in the Reserves from 1918 to 1929. During World War II, he served as director of the Honolulu office of the Office of Strategic Services from 1943 to 1945, where he oversaw radio broadcasts to eastern Asia and Indonesia.

== Later career ==
Tozzer returned from World War I to his post as associate professor at Harvard. Within three years he was a full professor and chairman of the Division of Anthropology.

In 1922, Tozzer won appointment to the Academic Board at Radcliffe College, and later become a trustee in 1928. He served on Harvard's Administrative Board from 1928 until his retirement in 1948.

Tozzer published several important works in Maya studies, among them, a grammar of the Maya language, and an annotated translation of Bishop Diego de Landa's Relación de las cosas de Yucatán. His magnum opus, "Chichen Itza and its Cenote of Sacrifice" (Cambridge, Massachusetts: Memoirs of the Peabody Museum, 1957), was published after his death in 1954. A massive volume with hundreds of illustrations, "It covers every aspect of Chichen Itza: its history, religious cults, arts, and industries as well as contacts with other regions," noted Samuel Kirkland Lothrop in his obituary of Tozzer. "It concentrates in a single volume the learning acquired in half a century."

Tozzer was elected a member of the American Academy of Arts and Sciences in 1911. He was elected to the Massachusetts Historical Society in 1925. He was elected by his peers to two consecutive terms as president of the American Anthropological Association beginning in 1928. He was elected to the American Philosophical Society in 1937. In 1942 he was elected to the National Academy of Sciences.

He died at his home in Cambridge, Massachusetts on October 5, 1954.

He was the husband of Margaret Castle Tozzer and father of figure skating champion Joan Tozzer.

== Honors ==
Tozzer was the first person awarded the American Anthropological Association's Alfred Vincent Kidder Award for Eminence in the Field of American Archaeology (1950).

In 1974 the Peabody Museum renamed its library the Tozzer Library, as Tozzer had been active in building its collection and in its management from 1935 to his retirement.
