= Charles Pickering Bowditch =

American archaeologist and businessman (1842–1921)

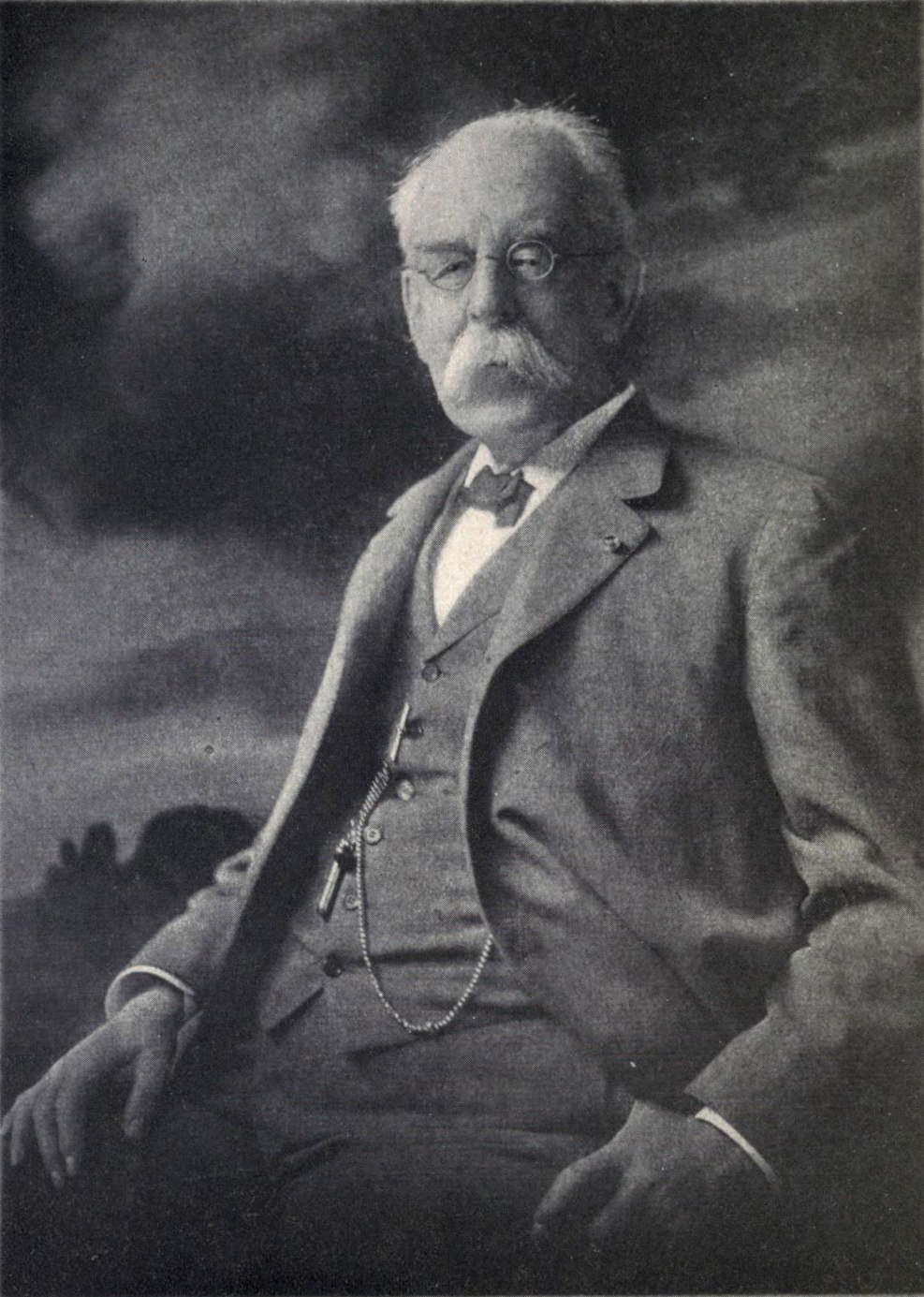
- Died: Jamaica Plain, Massachusetts, US
- Relatives: Nathaniel Bowditch (Grandfather); Henry Pickering Bowditch (Brother)

Charles Pickering Bowditch (September 30, 1842 – June 1, 1921) was an American financier, archaeologist, cryptographer and linguistics scholar who specialized in Mayan epigraphy. He served as president of the American Academy of Arts and Sciences from 1917 to 1919. He was a major donor for the Peabody Museum at Harvard University, and funded numerous academic expeditions to Central America.

== Personal life and education ==
Bowditch was born in Boston into the Massachusetts Bowditch family of mathematician Nathaniel Bowditch, his grandfather, and physiologist Henry Pickering Bowditch, his brother, son of Jonathan Ingersoll Bowditch and Lucy Orme Nichols. He prepared for college at the Dixwell School, where he graduated at the top of his class. He received his undergraduate degree in 1863 and his master's in 1866, both from Harvard University.

In 1866, he married Cornelia L. Rockwell who bore him four children who survived him. He died in 1921 in Jamaica Plain, Massachusetts, and was buried with a Unitarian service.

== Career ==
During the American Civil War, Bowditch served as an officer in the 55th Massachusetts Volunteer Infantry, a colored regiment, rising to the rank of captain, and then served as a captain in the 5th Massachusetts Volunteer Cavalry, also a colored regiment.

As a businessman Bowditch participated unsuccessfully in the Pennsylvania oil rush and returned to Massachusetts to manage the estate of Mrs. William Wadsworth, which gave him experience as a financial trustee. He went on to manage many trusts, was a director of the Massachusetts Cotton Mills and the Pepperell Manufacturing Company, the Boston and Providence Railroad Company, American Bell Telephone Company, and a director and later president of the Massachusetts Hospital Life Insurance Company. For three years he was vice-president of the American Bell Telephone Company.

== Academic interests and contributions ==
In 1888, Bowditch took a trip to the Yucatán and southern Mexico and became interested in the Mayan culture. While he funded much Mayan research, his own Mayan work focused on deciphering Mayan epigraphy and their calendar system. He was one of the founders of the American Anthropological Association. In 1891 Bowditch was elected a member of the American Antiquarian Society. He was treasurer of the American Academy of Arts and Sciences from 1905 to 1915 and went on to serve as president from 1917 to 1919. His family had deep ties to the academy: his grandfather Nathaniel Bowditch had previously served as president of the AAAS from 1829 to 1838, and his father had served as its treasurer from 1842 to 1852.

Bowditch made his first donation to Harvard's Peabody Museum in 1888, and during his life was its largest contributor. Beginning in 1891, Bowditch funded numerous expeditions to the Mayan areas of Central America through the museum, almost one per year until his death. In 1894 he was elected a trustee of the museum and served on its faculty. On his death he left a large collection of books and other materials on the languages of Central America and Mexico to the museum.

Among the expeditions that Bowditch funded were those of:

- John G. Owens at Copán,
- George Byron Gordon at Copán
- Marshall Howard Saville at Copán
- Teoberto Maler in the el Petén region of Guatemala and along the course of the Usumacinta River
- Edward Herbert Thompson at Chichen Itza and elsewhere in the Yucatán
- Alfred Marston Tozzer in British Honduras and northern Guatemala
- Raymond E. Merwin in British Honduras and northern Guatemala,
- Clarence L. Hay in British Honduras and northern Guatemala,
- Samuel Kirkland Lothrop in Honduras
- Sylvanus Griswold Morley, second expedition to the Yucatán, and
- Herbert Joseph Spinden in the southern Yucatán

Bowditch endowed a chair (a professorship) at Harvard in archaeology.

== Selected works ==
- Mexican and Central American antiquities, calendar systems, and history (1904)
- The Numeration, Calendar Systems and Astronomical Knowledge of the Mayans (1910)
- Bacon's Connection with the First Folio of Shakespeare
- Translation of Landa's Relación de las cosas de Yucatán
- Translation of Avendaño's Relación

== Memberships ==
- American Academy of Arts and Sciences
- American Anthropological Association
- American Antiquarian Society
- American Geographical Society
- Archaeological Institute of America
- The Bostonian Society
- Boston Society of Natural History
- the Colonial Society of Massachusetts
- International Congress of Americanists
- Massachusetts Historical Society
- Massachusetts Horticultural Society
- New England Historic Genealogical Society
- Société des Américanistes de Paris
