= Zelia Nuttall =

American archaeologist and anthropologist (1857–1933)

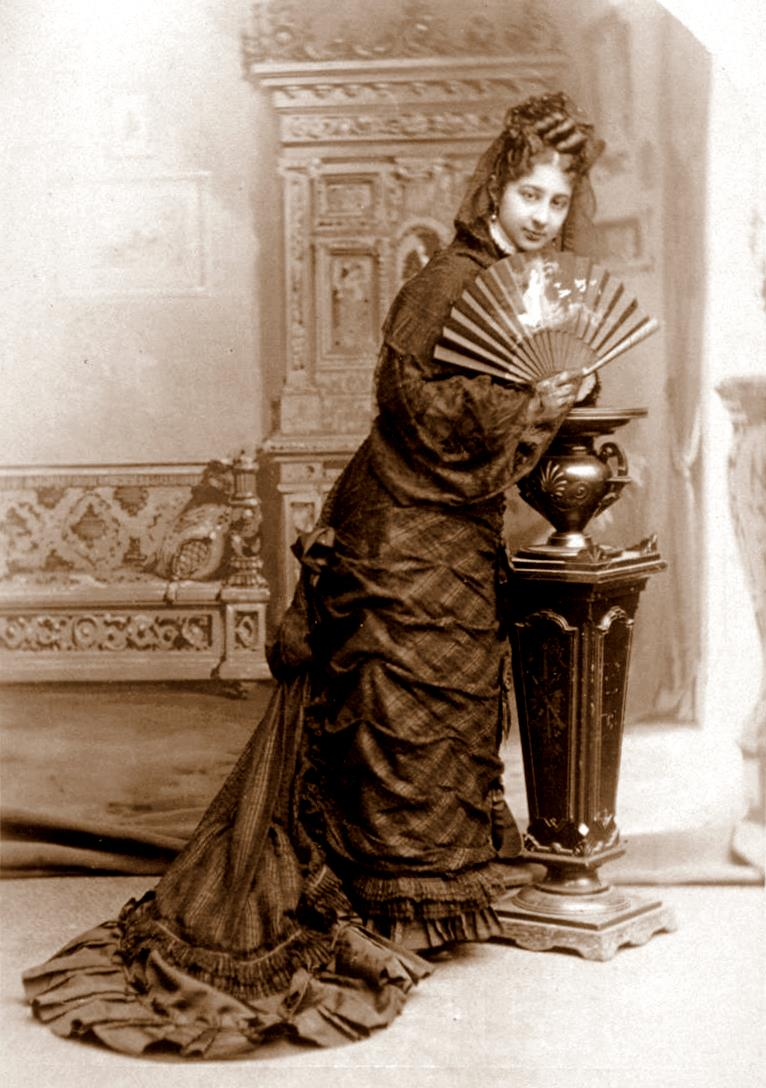
- Zelia Nuttall
- Born: Zelia Maria Magdalena Nuttall; September 6, 1857; San Francisco, California, U.S.
- Died: April 12, 1933 (aged 75); Casa de Alvarado, Coyoacán, Mexico
- Resting place: Panteón Americano Miguel Hidalgo, Miguel Hidalgo Borough, Ciudad de México, Mexico
- Occupation: archaeologist
- Known for: Mexican archaeology
- Spouse: Alphonse Pinart (m. 1880; div. 1888)
- Children: Nadine Nuttall Laughton (née Pinart)
- Parent(s): Robert Kennedy Nuttall; Magdalena Parrott
- Relatives: George Nuttall (brother)

Zelia Maria Magdalena Nuttall (September 6, 1857 – April 12, 1933) was an American archaeologist and anthropologist who specialised in pre-Aztec Mexican cultures and pre-Columbian manuscripts. She discovered two forgotten manuscripts of this type in private collections, one of them being the Codex Zouche-Nuttall. She decoded the Aztec calendar stone and was one of the first to identify and recognise artefacts dating back to the pre-Aztec period. Nuttall can also be credited for being first to ever challenge the prevailing theory of a California landing for Francis Drake's circumnavigation in spite of much adversity. She boldly proposed that Drake had sailed further North into the Pacific Northwest. Numerous northern coast researchers reexamined the few available records as a result.

== Biography ==
Nuttall was born in San Francisco, California, on September 6, 1857, the second of six children to Irish father Robert Kennedy Nuttall, a physician, and Mexican-American mother Magdalena Parrott. Her grandfather was John Parrott, one of San Francisco's richest bankers. When she was eight, the family moved to Europe where she was educated in France, Germany, Italy, and Bedford College in London. Nuttall became an excellent linguist, fluent in four languages and conversant in others.

When the family returned to San Francisco in 1879, she met the French ethnologist, Alphonse Pinart, who was in the city on an ethnological mission for the French government. The couple married in 1880 and Zelia traveled with her husband while he conducted research in the West Indies, France, and Spain. A year later they separated just before the birth of their daughter. They formally divorced in 1888 on the grounds of Pinart's cruelty and neglect of Zelia, and Zelia and her daughter returned to her maiden name. At the time of her divorce she also left the Catholic Church.

In 1884 Nuttall made her first trip to Mexico where she spent five months with her mother's wealthy family. During her stay she developed a life-long interest in Mexican history and archaeology. In 1886 she published her first professional article, "Terra Cotta Heads of Teotihuacan" for the American Journal of Archaeology. Nuttall demonstrated the figures were older than previously thought and used in funerary practices. The paper was well received by professionals in the field. She was admitted to the Archaeological Institute of America and the equally acclaimed American Philosophical Society. Frederic Ward Putnam, curator of the Peabody Museum at Harvard, named her special assistant in Mexican archaeology, an honorary post she held for forty-seven years.

Frederic Putnam and German-American anthropologist Franz Boas saw her as an excellent mediator between Americanist circles in different countries because of her education and cosmopolitan relations. In his 1886 annual report for the museum, Putnam praised Nuttall as "familiar with the Nahuatl language, having intimate and influential friends among the Mexicans, and with an exceptional talent for linguistics and archaeology." Her family background made her an ideal partner for relations with Mexico. This would play an important role in the creation of the institution of international cooperation International School of American Archeology and Ethnology in Mexico.

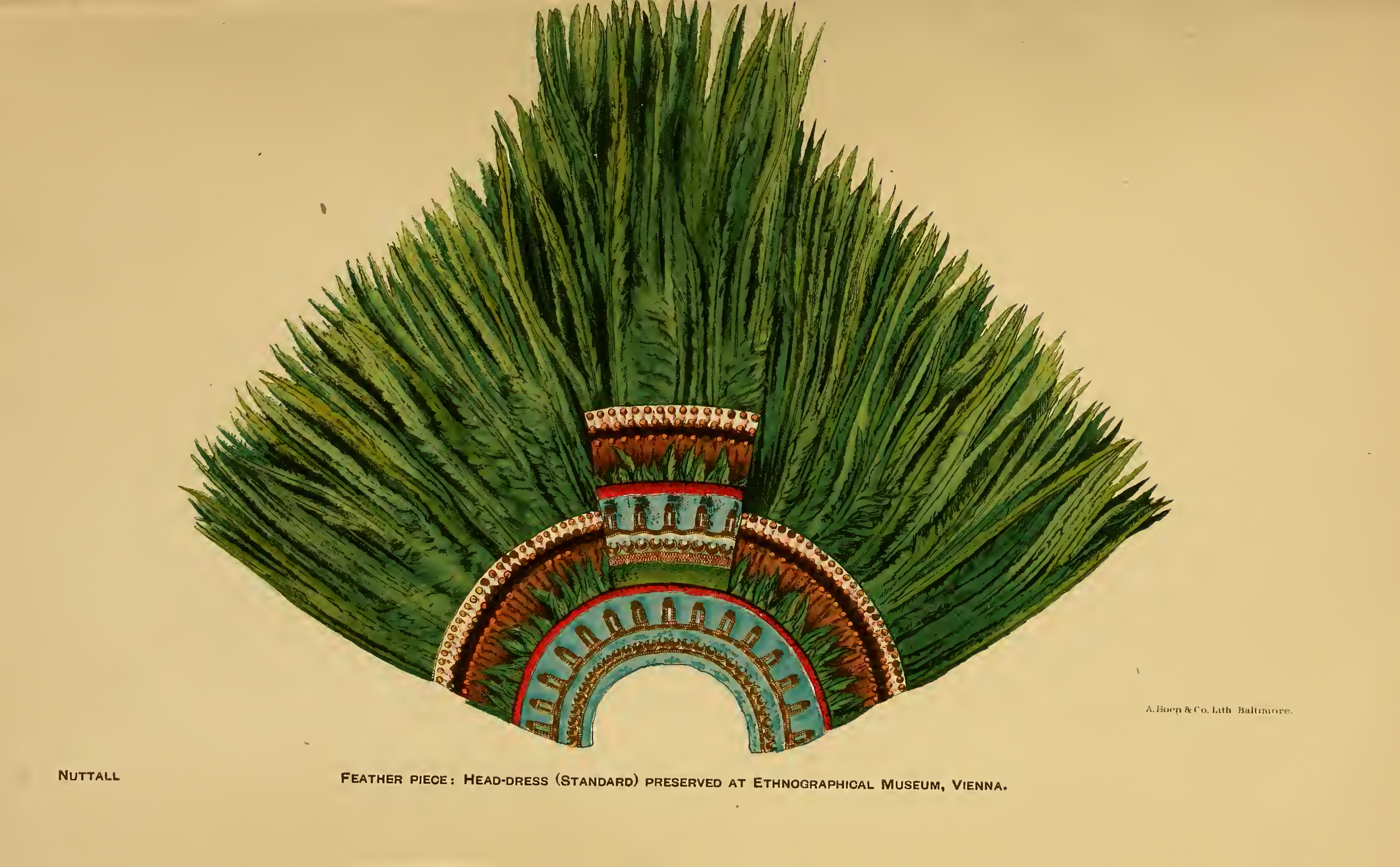
Feather Piece; Head-dress (Standard) preserved at Ethnographical Museum, Vienna

In 1886, Nuttall traveled with her brother to Europe and established her home in Dresden, Germany. She spent the next twelve years searching libraries and museums throughout Europe for information on the history of Mexico. One of her most important finds was a pre-Columbian document of Mixtec pictographs, now known as the Codex Nuttall. She found the manuscript in a private library of Baron Zouche in England. Nuttall was unable to acquire the codex but hired an artist to make a careful copy which was published by the Peabody Museum in 1902. Another important discovery was the Codex Magliabecchiano, which she published in 1903 under the title The Book of the Life of the Ancient Mexicans with an introduction, translation, and commentary. Her claim of discovery was later disputed by a European scholar who reported his find somewhat earlier, but it was Nuttall who publicized the document and made it accessible to a broad audience. In 1901, Nuttall published her largest academic work, The Fundamental Principles of New and Old World Civilizations. Although well received at the time, some of her theories were incorrect. She argued that seafaring Phoenicians sailed to the Americas and as a result of this influence, Meso-American civilizations had developed in parallel with those in Egypt and the Middle East. Archaeologists have since rejected this idea.

During one of her trips back to California, Nuttall met the wealthy philanthropist, Phoebe Hearst. Hearst became a friend, patron, and an important influence in Nuttall's career. Under Hearst's sponsorship, Nuttall joined a mission to Russia organized by the University of Pennsylvania to collect ethnographic materials for their museum. In 1901 Hearst sponsored the establishment of an anthropology department and museum at the University of California, Berkeley, and invited Nuttall to serve on the organizing committee.

In 1902 Nuttall returned to Mexico and worked under the auspices of the new Berkeley anthropology department. Hearst provided funds to purchase a large Spanish colonial mansion in the upscale Mexico City suburb of Coyoacán. Her home, which she renamed Casa de Alvarado, became her archaeological headquarters, laboratory and a meeting place for scientists and intellectuals. D. H. Lawrence was one of her house guests and he purportedly based his character Mrs. Norris in The Plumed Serpent after Nuttall. Nuttall developed a passion for gardening at Casa Alvarado. She studied Mexican garden art, grew medicinal herbs, and collected seeds of ancient Mexican food plants with the intention of introducing them into the United States. She also assisted in the introduction of taro cultivation in Orizaba.

In 1908, while doing research in the National Archives of Mexico, Nuttall came across a previously unknown manuscript relating to the voyage of Francis Drake's circumnavigation. The discovery prompted her to search archives in New York, Spain, Italy, and France, as well as archives in the Bodleian Library, British Museum and Public Record Office in London for other unpublished documents relating to Drake and John Hawkins. The results of her search, more than 65 previously unpublished documents, were translated and included in her book, New Light on Drake: A Collection of Documents Relating to his Voyage of Circumnavigation, 1577-1580 published in 1914. Based on her research, Nuttall believed that Drake had sailed much further north than was commonly believed along the west coast of North America. She summarized her thesis in a paper, "The Northern Limits of Drake's Voyage in the Pacific", delivered at the Panama-Pacific Historical Congress in 1915. Nuttall found several manuscripts and maps that led her to conclude that Drake was not on the California coast. She also found important incongruities between the ethnographic descriptions of the people living near the careening site as described by Drake and his crew, and the cultures of the Miwok and Pomo people. Particularly the descriptions of the native houses fitting the Northwest coast better. Following up on Nuttall's work, historian E.G. R. Taylor of Birkbeck College, theorized that the vocabulary words Drake and his chaplain recorded could be of a Chinookan language. In 2019 Darby established that these words were likely an early form of Chinook Jargon which was not spoken on the central California coastline.In 1916 Nuttall traveled to the Strait of Juan de Fuca between Vancouver Island and Washington State to confirm some details of Drake's travels.

Nuttall was active in Mexican archaeology for most of her career, but her only attempt to direct a large archaeological project, on Isla de Sacrificios, Mexico, was thwarted by Leopoldo Batres, Mexico's inspector of monuments. After performing preliminary research on the island and obtaining funds from the Mexican government, Nuttall was pushed aside by Batres who appointed himself director of the project. She published a full account of the incident in the American Anthropologist in 1910.

Nuttall died on April 12, 1933, at her home near Mexico City. Per her instructions, all of her personal papers were destroyed. The Mexican government seized her residence as payment for taxes and her extensive library was sold to pay off debts.

Nuttall was a member of several academic institutions, including the Harvard Peabody Museum and the National Museum of Anthropology in Mexico City and she carried out most of her activities without pay and on a fee-for-service basis. In 1895, she was elected as a member of the American Philosophical Society.

== Defence of Mesoamerican cultures ==
Nuttall investigated Mexico's past to give recognition and pride to its present at a time when Western archaeology favoured salacious narratives of ancient Mesoamericans. In 1897, Nuttall published Ancient Mexican Superstitions in The Journal of American Folklore. In it, she criticised the representation of ancient Mexicans as "bloodthirsty savages, having nothing in common with civilised humanity". "Such a hold upon the imagination that it effaces all other knowledge about the ancient civilisation of Mexico", she wrote. She hoped her work would "lead to a growing recognition of the bonds of universal brotherhood which unite the present inhabitants of this great and ancient continent to their not unworthy predecessors."

Outside of her work in anthropology and archaeology, Nuttall, partnered with Phoebe Hearst, worked to educate and preserve the heritage of indigenous Mexicans. One of her students was Manuel Gamio, who would eventually become one of Mexico's most famous archaeologists.

Nuttall advocated for the revival of Mexican traditions that had been eradicated during the Spanish conquest. In 1928, she called for a renewed celebration of the indigenous New Year, which was traditionally observed twice annually by numerous Mesoamerican cultures. That year, Mexico City celebrated the Aztec New Year for the first time since 1519.

== Penn Museum mission to Russia ==
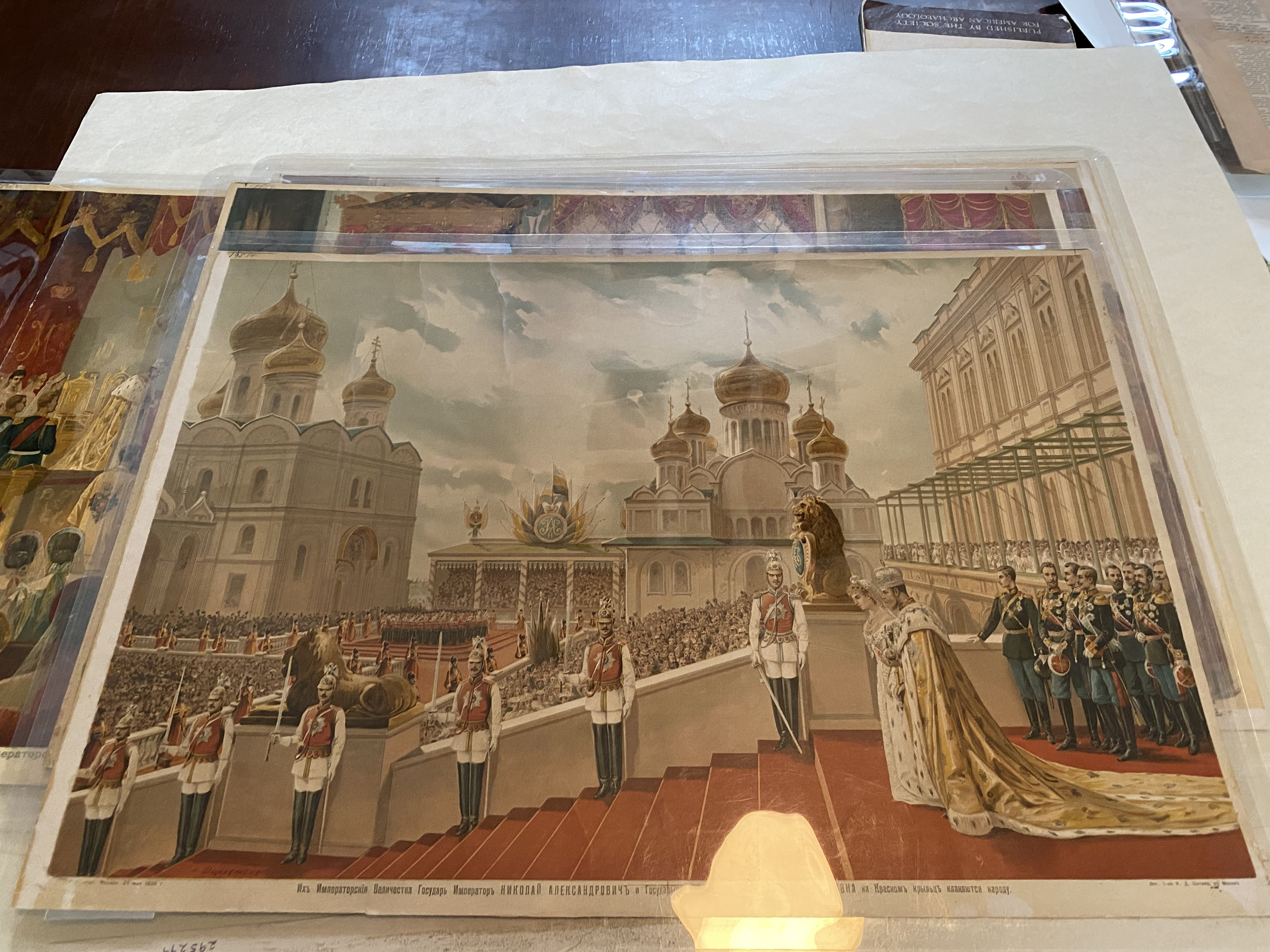
Zelia Nuttall collected this lithograph, along with others, of Czar Nicholas II and Czarina Alexandra's royal coronation where she was a guest. The lithographs are currently stored in the Penn Museum archives.

Zelia Nuttall was sent to Russia in 1894 as a representative of the Penn Museum to establish exchanges with Russian museums and offer financial assistance to Russian archaeological excavations in exchange for a share of their discoveries. Sara Yorke Stevenson, a member of the Penn Museum's Board of Managers and Curator of the Egyptian Section, chose Nuttall as the Museum's representative because of Nuttall's knowledge of Russian. The opportunity for Nuttall to attend the coronation of Nicholas II and Alexandra Feodorovna opened when noted philanthropist Phoebe Hearst cancelled her trip to the coronation, and passed the opportunity to the Penn Museum, along with the funds to defray travel expenses and acquire collections.

While Nuttall was in Moscow to attend the coronation, she set up several exchanges between Russian museums and the Penn Museum. In addition, she visited the Pan-Russian Industrial and Art Exhibition at Nizhny Novgorod, where she inspected numerous artifacts from regions as distant as Siberia, and collected more than 400 items from Russia, Finland, Poland, and Russian Turkestan. The artifacts included religious objects, musical instruments, pottery, color lithographs of the 1894 Russian coronation ceremony, and more. She also acquired a photograph collection illustrating customs of the Kyrgyz people from the vicinity of Tashkent and Samarkand.

== Publications ==
=== Ancient manuscripts ===
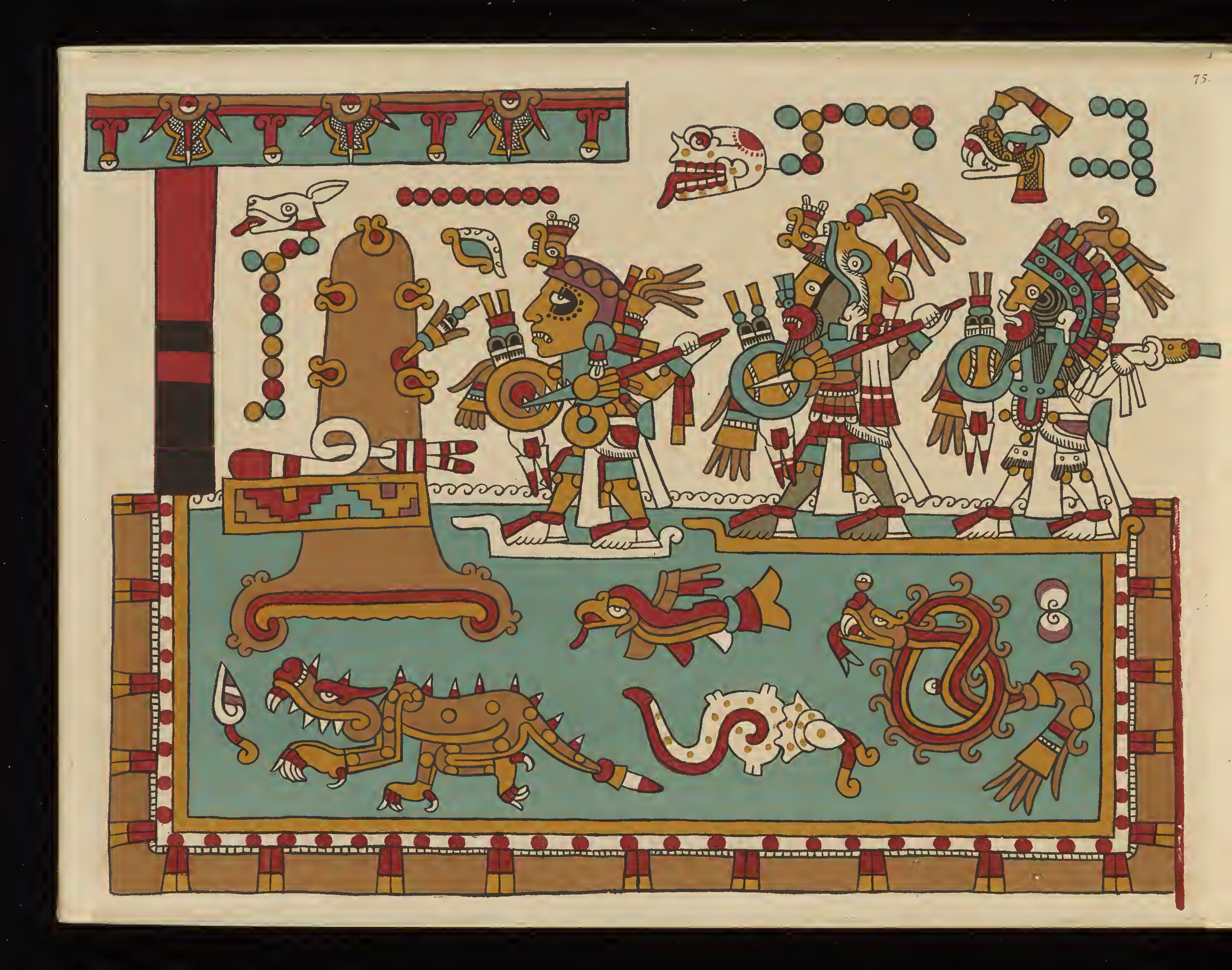
Page 75 from the Codex Zouche-Nuttall. Three Lords in their canoes set off to conquer a city on an island

Nuttall was known for her ability to find lost or forgotten manuscripts and bring them to the attention of scholars.

- She traced the Mixtec manuscript, now known as the Codex Zouche-Nuttall, in the library of its owner, Baron Zouche of Haryngworth. A facsimile with an introduction by Nuttall was published in 1902 by the Peabody Museum.
- In 1890, she identified in the National Central Library of Florence the Codex Magliabecchiano, which she published in 1903 through the University of California under the title The Book of the Life of the Ancient Mexicans. On that occasion, she entered into conflict with the Duke of Loubat, who published it in 1904 without crediting her with the discovery.
- In 1911, she found at the National Library of Spain the unfinished text of Francisco Cervantes de Salazar's Crónica de la Nueva España, dating from about 1560 and tracing the history of the conquest of Mexico. This was published in 1914
- She discovered a manuscript in National Library at Madrid relating to the prevention and cure of plague in Spain in 1600–1601. This was published in English translation in 1912
- She collected the manuscripts of Francis Drake and John Hawkins contained in the National Archives of Mexico, as well as in collections in New York, Spain, Italy, France and England (Bodleian Library, British Museum and Public Archives of London). The set was published in 1914 by the Hakluyt Society of London under the title A New Light on Drake. To complete the work, she traveled in 1916 to the Juan de Fuca Strait between Vancouver Island and Washington State to confirm the details of Drake's travels.

=== Works ===
- Nuttall, Zelia (1886). "The Terracotta Heads of Teotihuacan". American Journal of Archaeology. 2: 318–330. OCLC 25124813.
- Nuttall, Zelia (1888). Standard or head-dress? An historical essay on a relic of ancient Mexico. Cambridge, Mass.: Peabody Museum of American Archaeology and Ethnology. OCLC 313707016.
- Nuttall, Zelia (1891). The atlatl or spear-thrower of the ancient Mexicans. Cambridge, Massachusetts: Peabody Museum of American Archaeology and Ethnology. OCLC 3536622.
- Nuttall, Zelia (1892). On ancient Mexican shields : an essay. Leiden: P.W.M. Trap. OCLC 458945327.
- Nuttall, Zelia (1901). The fundamental principles of Old and New World civilizations : a comparative research based on a study of the Ancient Mexican religious, sociological and calendrical systems. Cambridge, Massachusetts: Peabody Museum of American Archaeology and Ethnology. OCLC 219742748.
- Nuttall, Zelia (1983) [1903]. The book of the life of the ancient Mexicans : containing an account of their rites and superstitions : an anonymous Hispano-Mexican manuscript preserved at the Biblioteca nazionale centrale, Florence, Italy. Berkeley: University of California Press. OCLC 10719260.
- Nuttall, Zelia (1904). A Penitential Rite of the Ancient Mexicans. Archaeological and Ethnological Papers of the Peabody Museum. Vol. 1. Cambridge, Massachusetts: The Museum. OCLC 2991502.
- Nuttall, Zelia (1906). "The astronomical methods of the ancient Mexicans". In Laufer, Berthold (ed.). Boas Anniversary Volume. Anthropological papers written in honor of Franz Boas, Professor of Anthropology in Columbia University. New York: G.E. Stechert & Co. pp. 290–298.
- Nuttall, Zelia (1910). "The island of Sacrificios". American Anthropologist. 12 (2): 257–295. doi:10.1525/aa.1910.12.2.02a00070. OCLC 29606682.
- Nuttall, Zelia; Pedro Sarmiento de Gamboa; Nuno da Silva (1914). New Light on Drake: Documents Relating to his Voyage of Circumnavigation 1577-1580. London: Hakluyt Society. OCLC 2018572.
