= Hacienda Chichén =

- Hotel
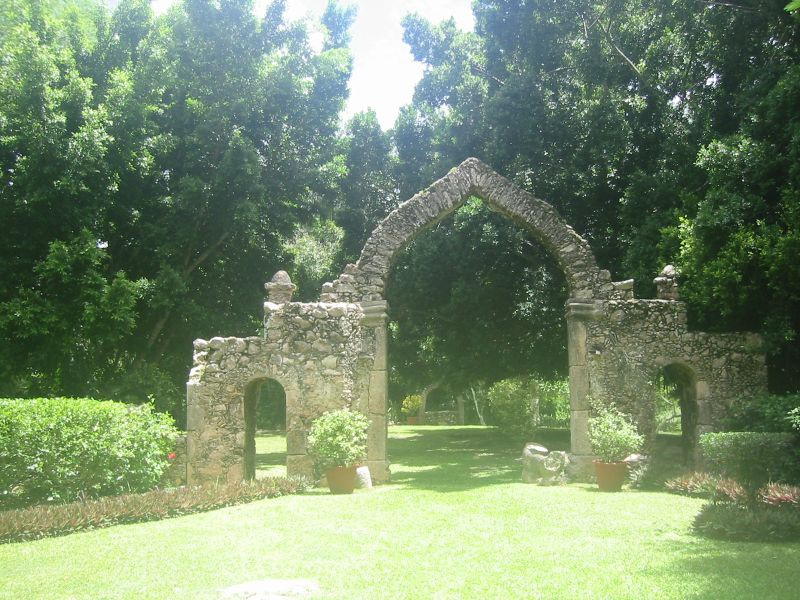
- Entrance Arch Hacienda Chichén

- Location in Mexico
- Coordinates: 20°40′12″N 88°34′12″W
- Country: Mexico
- Mexican States: Yucatán
- Municipalities: Tinúm
- Time zone: UTC−6 (CST)
  - Summer (DST): UTC−5 (CDT)
- Postal code: 97757
- Area code: 985

Hacienda Chichén is located within the ancient Maya city of Chichen Itza, in the county of Tinum, Yucatán, Mexico. It was one of the first haciendas established in Yucatán and was in ruins by 1847. Edward Herbert Thompson, U.S. consul in Yucatán, purchased Hacienda Chichén, including the archaeological site visited today in 1894. He excavated, explored and exported goods from the site to the Peabody Museum for over 3 decades. In 1926, he was charged with trafficking of antiquities but the charges were later dropped and his heirs sold the site. The purchaser, Fernando Barbachano Peon is credited with beginning the tourism industry of Yucatán and being the first hotelier to change a hacienda into a hotel.

== Toponymy ==
The name (Chichen) is a word from the Mayan language meaning mouth of the springs.

== History ==
Some accounts claim that the hacienda at Chichén was built in 1523, but histories relate that the conquest of Yucatán began when Francisco de Montejo landed near Valladolid in 1527. He proceeded to Chichén Itzá, to build one of the two fortresses he had been commissioned to establish. After securing friendship with the native population, the Spaniards built a village of houses in the same style as the natives of vertical wooden logs and palm-frond roofs. Montejo left 170 soldiers at the settlement. After a battle with the Indians, 150 of the Spanish were killed and the settlement was deserted. Though numerous attempts were made to conquer Yucatán, no success was made until 1540 when Montejo's son, Francisco de Montejo the Younger established a settlement at San Francisco de Campeche and then Mérida in 1542 and finally sent a nephew to settle Valladolid in 1543.

In 1888, an archaeologist visiting the site of Chichén Itzá noted that an Indian raid had occurred in 1847 after which the hacienda was abandoned. He noted that the church and buildings of the large cattle hacienda were overgrown but in reasonably good condition. The church and hacienda were both constructed with stones from the Maya temples and buildings.

In 1894, Edward Herbert Thompson US consul in Yucatán purchased Hacienda Chichén, which included the Chichén Itzá archeological site, with funds secured by Alison V. Armour. Thompson restored the hacienda which had been destroyed during the Caste War of Yucatán and spent 30 years examining and excavating the archaeological site. He dredged the Cenote Sagrado (Sacred Cenote), and hired divers to explore it, shipping many of his finds to the Peabody Museum of Archaeology and Ethnology. In 1926, the Mexican government seized Hacienda Chichén and charged Thompson with trafficking antiquities. After Thompson's death, the Mexican government dropped the charges and returned the property to his heirs. In 1944, Thompson's heirs sold the property to Fernando Barbachano Peon, a grandnephew of former Yucatán Governor Miguel Barbachano.

Barbachano recognized the opportunity of creating tourism around the area's Mayan heritage and converted the hacienda into a hotel, a first for Yucatán and hosted the first scientific exploration by the Carnegie Institution led by Sylvanus Morley. Upon the death of Barbachano, Carmen Barbachano inherited the Hacienda Chichén, while her brothers inherited the remainder of the estate.

The 28-room Hacienda Chichén has been updated into an eco-hotel featuring a Mayan holistic healing center known a Yaxkin Spa. Each of its rooms is named after one of the archaeologists who stayed there. Spacious terraces, a museum, two gardens, a conservation area of regional flora and fauna, and a private church make Hacienda Chichén a unique setting for private events, weddings, or photographic sessions.

== Bibliography ==
- Bracamonte, P and Solís, R., Los espacios de autonomía maya, Ed. UADY, Mérida, 1997.
- Gobierno del Estado de Yucatán, "Los municipios de Yucatán", 1988.
- Kurjack, Edward y Silvia Garza, Atlas arqueológico del Estado de Yucatán, Ed. INAH, 1980.
- Patch, Robert, La formación de las estancias y haciendas en Yucatán durante la colonia, Ed. UADY, 1976.
- Peón Ancona, J. F., "Las antiguas haciendas de Yucatán", en Diario de Yucatán, Mérida, 1971.

== Photo gallery ==
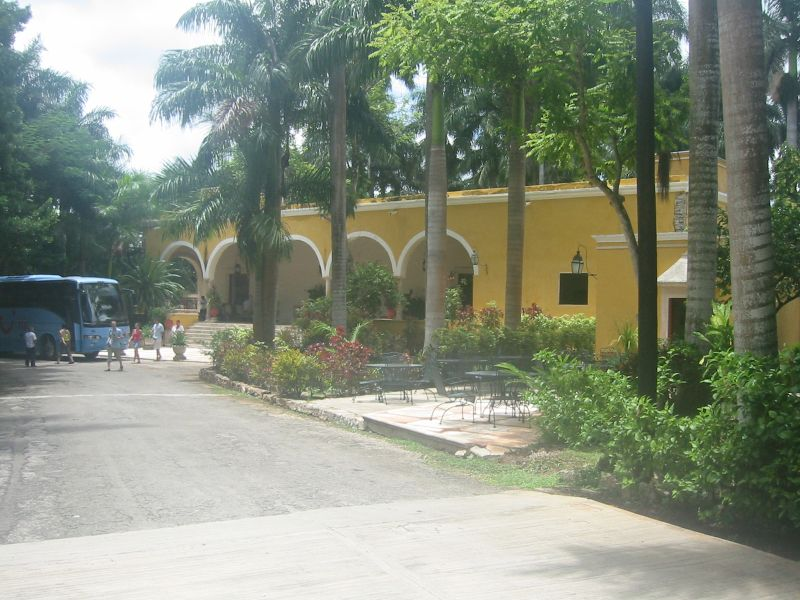
Hacienda Chichén Main House

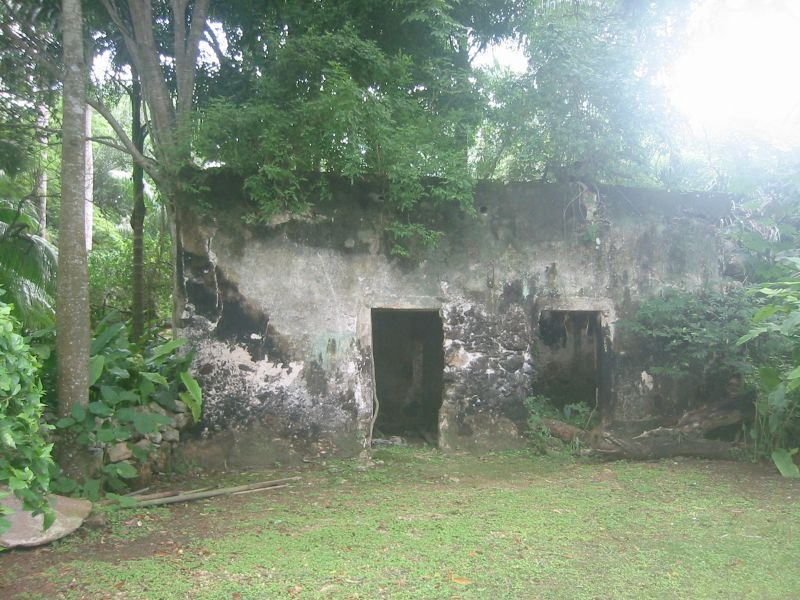
Hacienda Chichén Grounds

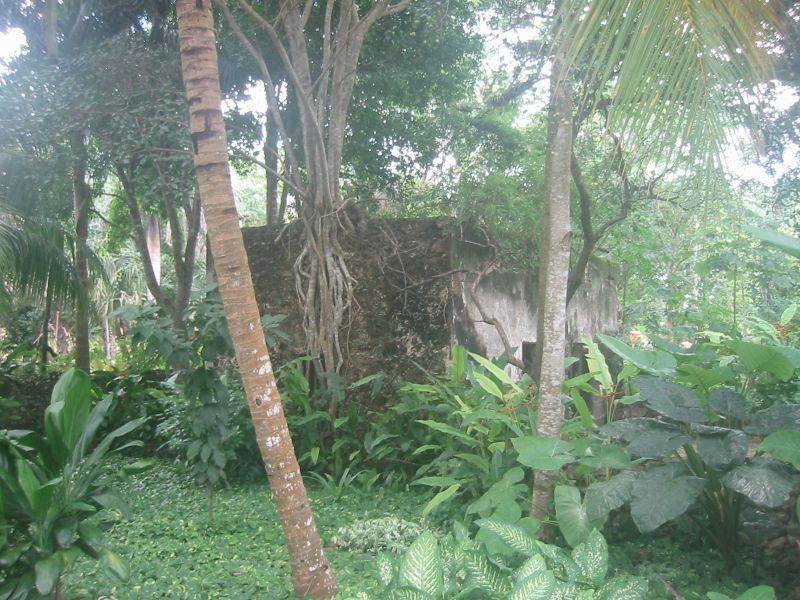
Hacienda Chichén Grounds
