= Anthropology of the Middle East =

- Discipline: Middle Eastern studies
- Language: English
- Edited by: Soheila Shahshahani

Publication details
- History: 2008-present
- Publisher: Berghahn Books
- Frequency: Biannually

Standard abbreviations
- ISO 4: Anthropol. Middle East

Indexing
- ISSN: 1746-0719 (print); 1746-0727 (web)
- LCCN: 2006256061
- OCLC no.: 85855833

Links
- Journal homepage

Anthropology of the Middle East is a biannual peer-reviewed academic journal published by Berghahn Books. It focuses on Middle Eastern culture and its contribution to the world. It is edited by Soheila Shahshahani (Shahid Beheshti University).

== Abstracting and indexing ==
The journal is abstracted and indexed in:

- Abstracts in Anthropology
- Anthropological Literature
- British Humanities Index
- eHRAF: Collection in Ethnography
- International Bibliography of Book Reviews of Scholarly Literature on the Humanities and Social Sciences
- International Bibliography of the Social Sciences
- International Bibliography of Periodical Literature
- Index Islamicus
- MLA International Bibliography
- Scopus
- Sociological Abstracts
