= Sara Yorke Stevenson =

American archaeologist (1847–1921)

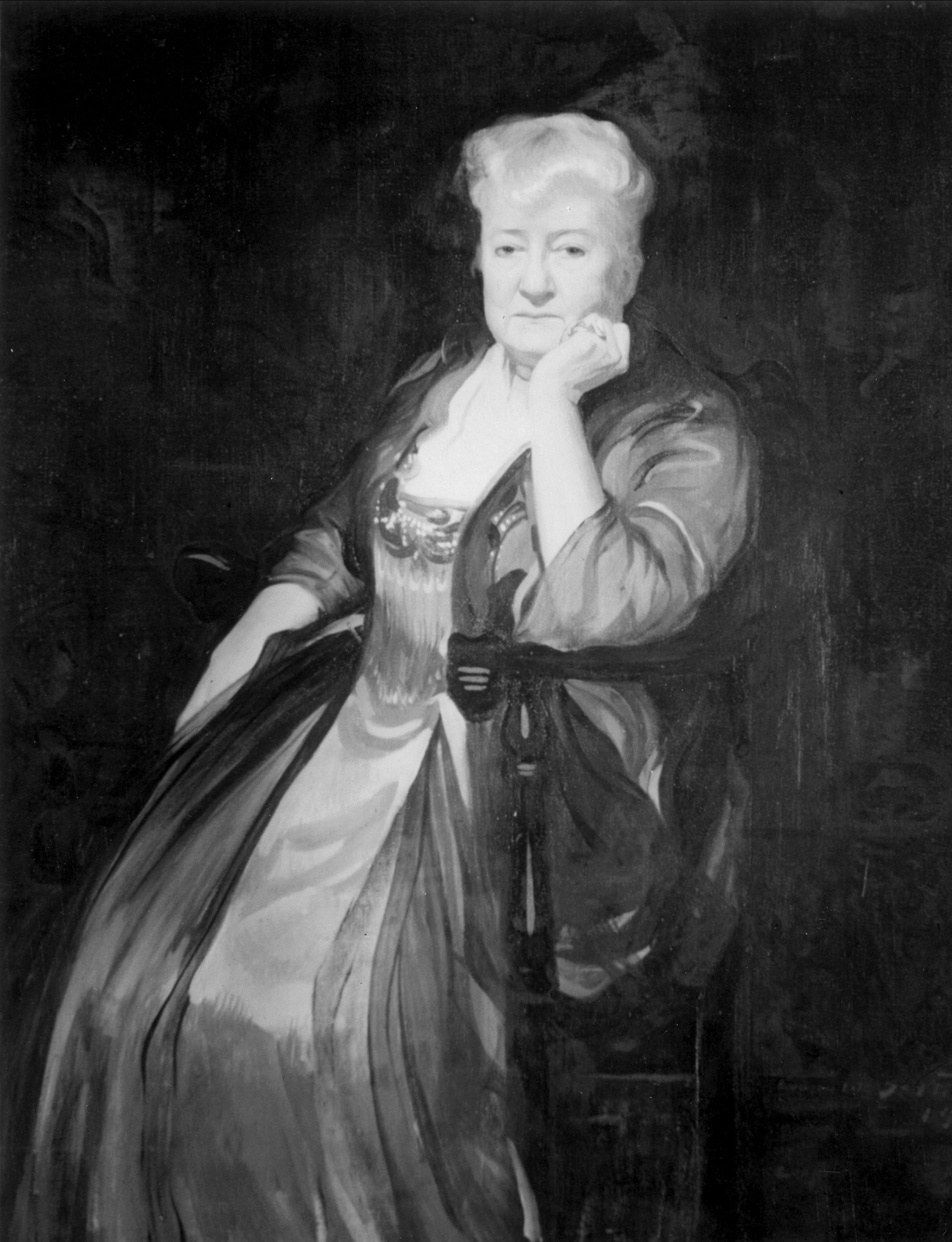
- 1917 portrait by Leopold Seyffert
- Born: February 19, 1847; Philadelphia, Pennsylvania, U.S.
- Died: November 14, 1921 (aged 74)
- Resting place: Laurel Hill Cemetery, Philadelphia, Pennsylvania, U.S.
- Occupation: Archeologist

Sara Yorke Stevenson (February 19, 1847 – November 14, 1921) was an American archaeologist specializing in Egyptology, one of the founders of the University of Pennsylvania Museum of Archaeology and Anthropology, suffragist and women's rights activist, and a columnist for the Philadelphia Public Ledger.

As a scholar, Stevenson published books and articles on Egyptology and the material culture of the ancient Near East, as well as a memoir about the reign of Maximilian I of Mexico. She was the first curator of the Egyptian Collection at the Penn Museum and played an important role in acquiring much of the collection itself. As a women's rights activist, she served as the first president of the Equal Franchise Society and the Civic Club of Philadelphia. She was the first woman to receive an honorary degree from the University of Pennsylvania, the first woman to lecture at the Peabody Museum at Harvard University, and the first female member of the Jury of Awards for Ethnology at the World's Columbian Exposition in Chicago.

== Personal life ==
=== Parents ===
Sara Yorke Stevenson's parents were Edward Yorke (December 20, 1798 – 1868) and Sarah Hanna Yorke, who married in New Orleans, Louisiana in 1834 and who moved to Paris during the 1840s. They both came from established families: her mother's family owned a large cotton plantation and her father was a cotton broker.

Edward Yorke was born in Philadelphia and moved to New Orleans to represent the Yorke & Macalister law firm. In Louisiana he was involved in the establishment of the public school system in New Orleans. He became interested in business ventures, including the introduction of gas to Paris, and a trans-isthmian railway in Tehuantepec. He died of paralysis in Vermont in 1868. Sarah Hanna was born in Alabama and moved with her family to New Orleans.

==== Childhood and Early Life in France ====
Sara Letitia Yorke was born in the Rue de Courcelles in Paris on February 19, 1847. Sara's parents moved back to the States when she was only ten, leaving their daughters to attend boarding school in France. She lived in Paris from 1858 through 1862 under the guardianship of M. Achille Jubinal, who inspired Stevenson's early interest in archaeology and Egyptology. During this time she met the Duke of Morny, half-brother of Napoleon and prominent figure in the French Intervention in Mexico, a conflict with which she would soon become profoundly familiar. In 1862, Sara departed France for Mexico by sea, about which she wrote:

There were only forty passengers on board, and, comparatively speaking, little of the animation that usually precedes the outgoing of an ocean steamer. I found without difficulty the French banker and his Mexican wife who had kindly consented to chaperon me during my lonely journey; and I soon discovered that she and I were the only women passengers on board.

==== Mexico ====
In 1862 the Yorke family moved to Tacubaya, a suburb of Mexico City, following the murder of Sara's brother Ogden. In Mexico she attended many social gatherings of the newly appointed Empress of Mexico Charlotte of Belgium and her husband Maximilian. Stevenson's first-hand account of the Second Mexican Empire, Maximilian in Mexico: A Woman's Reminiscences of the French Intervention 1862-1867 (New York, 1899), gave great insight into the inner workings of court life during that time. C.M. Mayo commented on this book was the "most lucid, informed, and balanced...of all the English language memoirs of the Second Empire/French Intervention. Sara Yorke Stevenson and her mother, Sarah Hanna Yorke, appear in Mayo's novel The Last Prince of the American Empire.

==== United States ====
In 1867, the Yorke family relocated to Vermont. Sara's father died only a year later, in 1868, and soon afterwards, at the age of twenty-one, Sara Yorke moved to Philadelphia to live with two of her uncles and an aunt on the Yorke side of her family.

=== Marriage and family ===
Sara Yorke married Cornelius Stevenson, a Philadelphia lawyer, on June 30, 1870. Cornelius Stevenson was born in Philadelphia on January 14, 1842, the only son of Adam May and Anna Smith (Philips) Stevenson. He served as a private in the First Troop, Philadelphia City Cavalry during the Civil War.

Sara Yorke Stevenson and Cornelius Stevenson had one child, William Yorke Stevenson (1878-1922) who married Christine Wetherill Rice.

=== Death ===
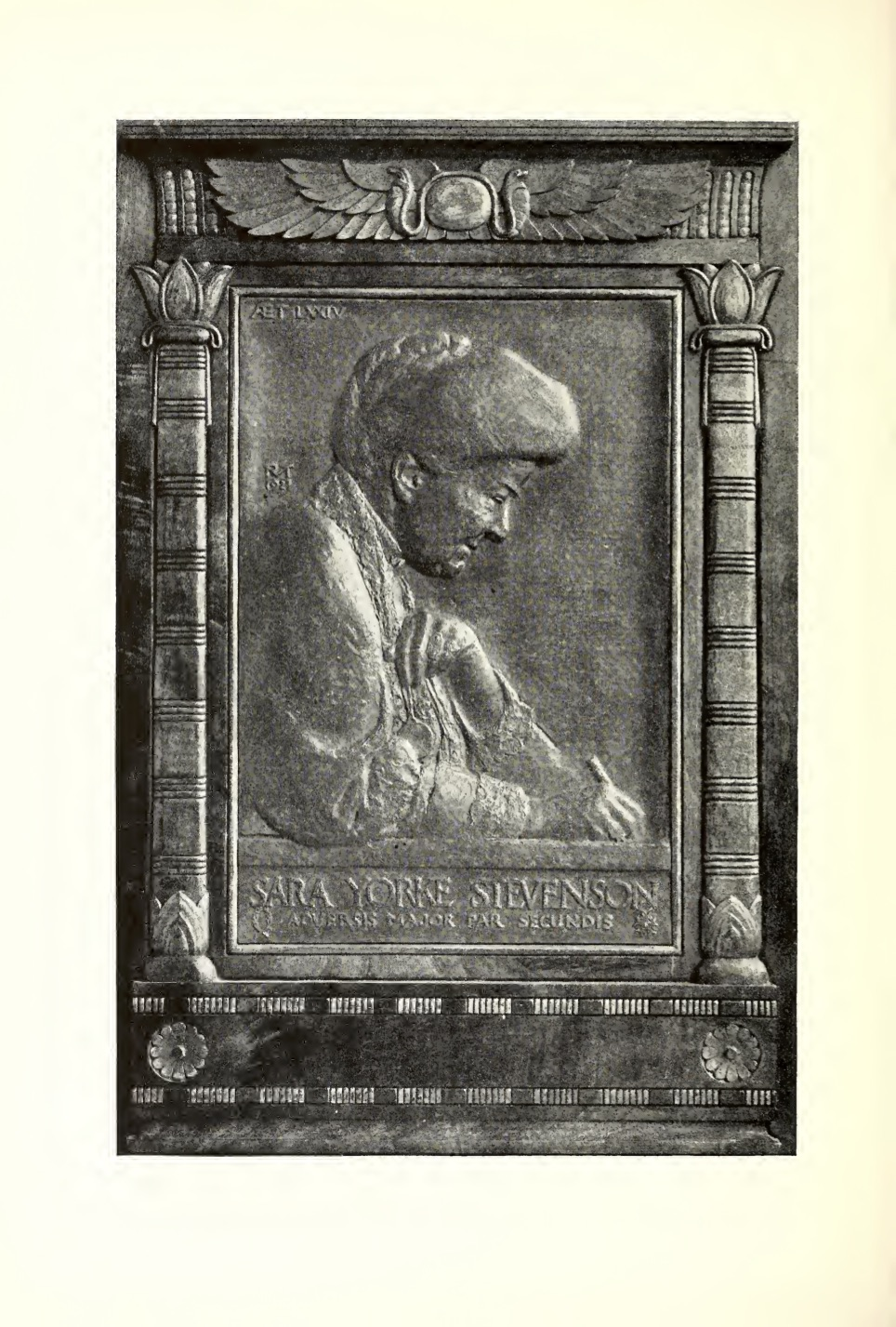
Sara Yorke Stevenson Tribute Plate

Sara Yorke Stevenson died on November 14, 1921. In February 1922, a tribute to Stevenson was included in the Pennsylvania Museum Bulletin that described her as follows:

To us there will always rise, at the mention of Mrs. Stevenson's name, the dignified little figure with the black bag out of which she brought, like the unexpected mother in the Swiss Family Robinson, precisely the thing needed at the moment. For wise counsel, for tolerance, for understanding sympathy, we all of us came to her and never were refused. Her counsel was based on an experience of the world which included half a century of real intimacy with brilliant and wise people who sought her as a companion; it was poignant with interludes of the Mexican capital, Parisian days and Egyptian excavations. It was invariably moral and direct, but tempered with a worldliness that was never the counsel of the fear of consequences. Her tolerance, while it seemed almost universal, balked at glossing over a sham or condoning insincerity. If she did not always suffer fools gladly she was generally able to contrive some amusement from them to shorten their discourse by a quick turn of wit.

The Sara Yorke Stevenson papers were removed from the home of Frances Anne Wister and donated to LaSalle University's Connelly Library as a part of the Owen Wister Collection by the David Prince Estate. She is buried at Laurel Hill Cemetery in Philadelphia.

== Professional and civic life ==
=== Civic societies ===
Stevenson played a leading role in several local civic societies (aka civil societies, or groups of community of citizens often linked by collective interests and activities) including serving as the founder and first president of the Equal Franchise Society of Philadelphia, co-founder and two-term president of the Civic Club of Philadelphia (a group of women who advocated for civic reform and improvement), the president of the Acorn Club for 25 years, president of the Contemporary Club, and chair of the French War Relief Committee of the Emergency Aid of Pennsylvania. She also served on the Women's Centennial Committee of the Philadelphia Centennial Exhibition of 1876, which created an exhibition known as the Women's Pavilion that showcased "for the first time, at an international exposition, the intimate bonds, shared values, and material achievements of women" and was hailed as a milestone in the women's movement of the 19th century.

==== The Furness-Mitchell Coterie ====
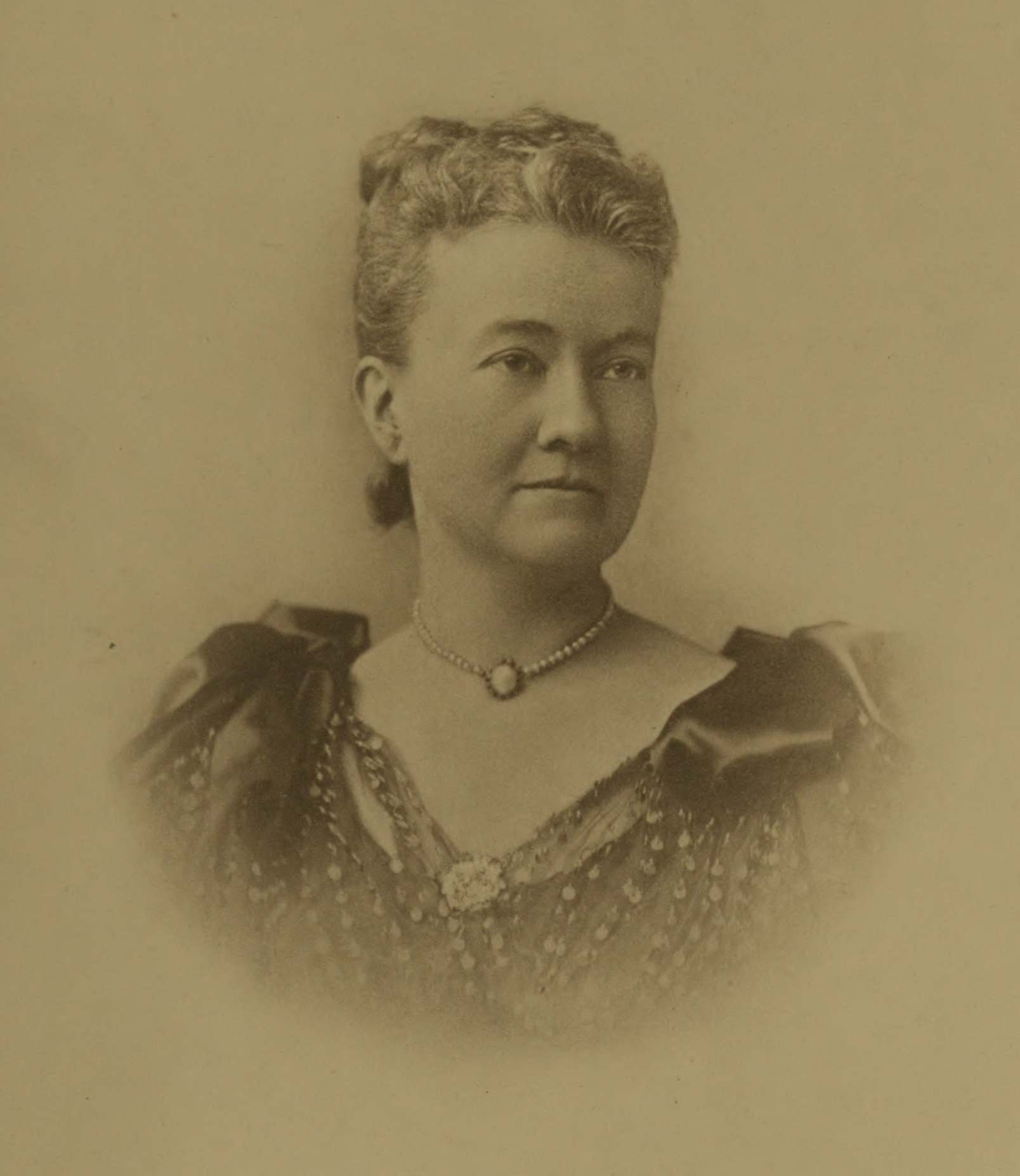
Early Portrait of Sara Yorke Stevenson

Stevenson was part of a group of internationally known Philadelphia elite scholars, known as the Furness-Mitchell Coterie, who were a driving force in many areas, especially anthropology, during the late nineteenth and early twentieth centuries. The group included musicians, physicians, writers, scholars, anthropologists, and educators and was "unusual in its acceptance of accomplished women as intellectual equals". Because of her involvement in the coterie, Stevenson was able to form close relationships and work collaboratively with other members of the group, including Horace Howard Furness, Owen Wister, S. Weir Mitchell, Talcott Williams, and Agnes Irwin.

==== The Equal Franchise Society of Philadelphia ====
Stevenson established the Equal Franchise Society of Pennsylvania, in recognition of the difficulties women faced in obtaining the right to vote. She served as president until 1910 and first vice president until the Federal Suffrage Amendment passed in 1920. In 1910, the Equal Franchise Society of Philadelphia republished the speech entitled "Shall Women Have the Right to Vote?", originally delivered by Wendell Philipps in Worcester, MA in 1851. In the forward of the publication, Stevenson (signed only as 'S.Y.S.'), reflected on the ongoing struggle for women's suffrage, writing:

A Chinese philosopher, a disciple of Laotse, once said: “Man is like a child born at midnight who when he sees the sunrise, thinks there was no yesterday.” There are many persons in the community even today, who regard the present movement in favor of equal suffrage as a transitory, hysterical agitation of a demagogic nature, of which the impulse has been received in the United States from the outbreaks of militant partisans in England. In the minds of these persons, the movement in the past is vaguely associated with eccentric clothing and more or less ridicule; in the present, with the restlessness of what is regarded as an unwomanly demonstration.

While believers in equal suffrage in this country have taken advantage of the interest aroused in every part of the world by the news from the militant suffragists of England, the movement can claim a respectable history and a fairly long pedigree. If in the last century the pioneers in the demand for “Women's Rights” in England found strength in the support of such men as John Stuart Mill, their American sisters found among others an outspoken champion in another clear thinker— Wendell Phillips.

The principle of equality is generally admitted—the question of expediency still faces us. In reprinting Wendell Phillips’ admirable address, the intention therefore, is to make clear the relation of the present movement to its historical background. While listening to the words of a strong man who, in 1851, had the courage to support an unpopular cause in the interest of justice and fair play, it is hoped that encouragement will be given to those who today are fighting in the ranks. - S. Y. S

With regard to her active role in the women's rights movement, Stevenson said the following: "The days of useless martyrdom are over, also those of heroic sacrifice where it is not needed. What we need to do today is not to slaughter men and parties who do not happen to think as we do … but to educate them, teach them to see, to know, to love, to feel, to grow."

== Career ==
=== Anthropology and egyptology ===
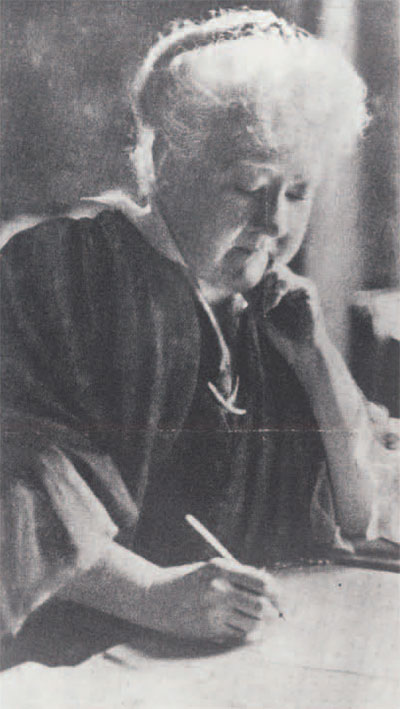
Sara Yorke Stevenson Working

In the 1880s anthropology was still emerging as an established academic discipline, and universities were beginning to develop and formalize their anthropology departments. Stevenson became involved in Egyptological pursuits through her membership in the American branch of the Egypt Exploration Fund, which was founded in 1882 by Amelia Edwards. Throughout her career, Stevenson made several trips overseas, although she never carried out her own archaeological fieldwork. She contributed to the collections of what is now the University of Pennsylvania' Museum of Anthropology and Archaeology as the first curator of the Egyptian and Mediterranean section, a position to which she was appointed in 1890. "Anthropological Work in America", an article in the July 1892 issue of Popular Science Monthly, declared that Stevenson "is perhaps [America's] only lady Egyptologist. Her lectures in Egyptian subjects have made a sensation." She mentored with Frederick Ward Putnam, who had just established Harvard's anthropology department, along with Franz Boas, Zelia Nuttall, and Alice Fletcher. Stevenson's interests were very wide and ranged from cultural diffusion to cultural evolution.

In 1892 Putnam supported Stevenson's appointment to the Jury of Awards for Ethnology during the World's Columbian Exposition in Chicago. A special act had to be passed to allow a woman to serve this position; Stevenson was elected vice president of the jury. In 1894 Stevenson was the first woman to speak at the Peabody Museum on "Egypt at the Dawn of History". She was president of the Oriental Club of Philadelphia, the Contemporary Club, president and secretary Pennsylvania Chapter of the Archaeological Institute of America, and was founder and officer of the University Archaeological Association, the American Folk-Lore Society, and the American Exploration Society. She was also a member of the Numismatic and Antiquarian Society of Philadelphia and in 1895 was one of the first two women admitted to the American Philosophical Society. Stevenson also joined the American Association for the Advancement of Science in 1884 and was nominated a Fellow in 1895.

In 1894, Stevenson was the first woman to receive an honorary doctorate degree from the University of Pennsylvania. She also received an honorary degree from Temple University, and medals from the National Institute of Social Sciences Association.

Of Stevenson's role, Langdon Warner stated: "“If women today find no difficulty in being recognized as scholars, and if their counsel is demanded in Museums, it is due to Mrs. Stevenson in a far greater measure than our casual generation will ever know."

==== University of Pennsylvania Museum of Archaeology and Anthropology ====
Stevenson played a pivotal role in the establishment of the University of Pennsylvania Museum of Archaeology and Anthropology (Penn Museum). In 1891, Stevenson, William Pepper, Talcott Williams, and Joseph Coates were appointed by the University Archaeological Association to create the Department of Archaeology and Paleontology. Stevenson then served on the governing board from its start (1892) until 1905 (secretary 1894-1904; president 1904-05). During her tenure, she contributed to the building of the "Free Museum of Science and Art", which was first dedicated in 1899 and which eventually became the Penn Museum. She served as the curator of the Egyptian and Mediterranean section of the museum from 1890 to 1905. In her position as curator, Stevenson was concerned with collections acquisitions and in 1898 she travelled to Egypt and purchased 42 cases of artifacts for the American Exploration Society, mostly from the ancient site of Dendereh, including the Penn Museum's first papyrus.

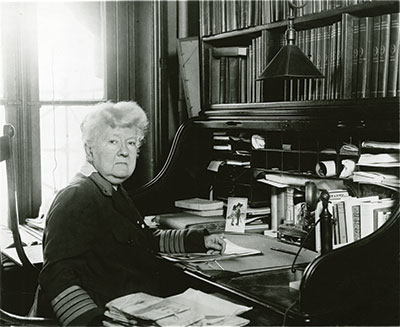
Stevenson in her office at the Penn Museum

In 1905, Stevenson, along with more than 125 supporters, resigned from her position at the museum following controversy surrounding Herman Hilprecht's personal appropriations and fraudulent publication of antiquities. Hilprecht was cleared of charges but Stevenson never returned to her position at the museum.

As noted in her Penn Museum biography: "As one of the principal founders of the University Museum, one whose contributions to the building program of the Museum was essential to its success, Stevenson set a powerful example for generations of women to follow."

=== Journalism ===
Stevenson wrote as a columnist for the Philadelphia Public Ledger under the pen names Peggy Shippen ("Peggy Shippen's Diary") and Sally Wistar ("Sally Wistar Says") until 1920. As Peggy Shippen, Stevenson wrote a society column for Philadelphia's elite, and her pseudonym paid homage to Peggy Shippen, a Philadelphian and a prominent figure during the Revolutionary War who was married to Benedict Arnold.

=== Education and museum studies ===
Following her departure from the Penn Museum in 1905, Stevenson developed one of the first college-level courses in training museum professionals in the United States, which she taught from 1908 until her death in 1921, at the Pennsylvania Museum and School of Industrial Art, later known as The University of the Arts (Philadelphia). Her lectures covered topics ranging from "The Modern Museum and its Functions" to "The Diseases of Objects and Remedies." She also became a curator in the museum now known as the Philadelphia Museum of Art.

== Scholarly publications ==
- "On Certain Symbols used in the Decoration of some Potsherds from Daphnae and Naukratis, now in the Museum of the University of Pennsylvania," Proceedings of the Numismatic and Antiquarian Society of Philadelphia for 1890–91, 1892.
- "The Tomb of King Amenhotep," Papers on Egyptian Archaeology, 1892.
- "Mr. Petrie's Discoveries at Tel el-Amarna," Science Vol. 19; Nos. 480–482, 510.
- "An Ancient Egyptian Rite Illustrating a Phase of Primitive Thought," International Congress of Anthropology, Memoirs, Chicago, 1894, 298–311.
- "Some Sculptures from Koptos in Philadelphia," American Journal of Archaeology 10 (1895), 347–351.
- "The Feather and the Wing in Early Mythology," Oriental Studies of the Oriental Club of Philadelphia, 1894, 202–241.
- "On the Remains of Foreigners Discovered in Egypt by Mr. W.M. Flinders Petrie, 1895, now in the Museum of the University of Pennsylvania," Proceedings of the American Philosophical Society, Vol. XXXV.
- Maximilian in Mexico: A Woman's Reminiscences of the French Intervention. New York, 1899.
- Egypt and Western Asia in Antiquity by Ferdinand Justi, Morris Jastrow Jr., and Sara Y. Stevenson, Philadelphia, 1905.
