= Sacred Cenote =

Water-filled sinkhole at the Maya archaeological site of Chichen Itza

Coordinates: 20.687708°N 88.567694°W

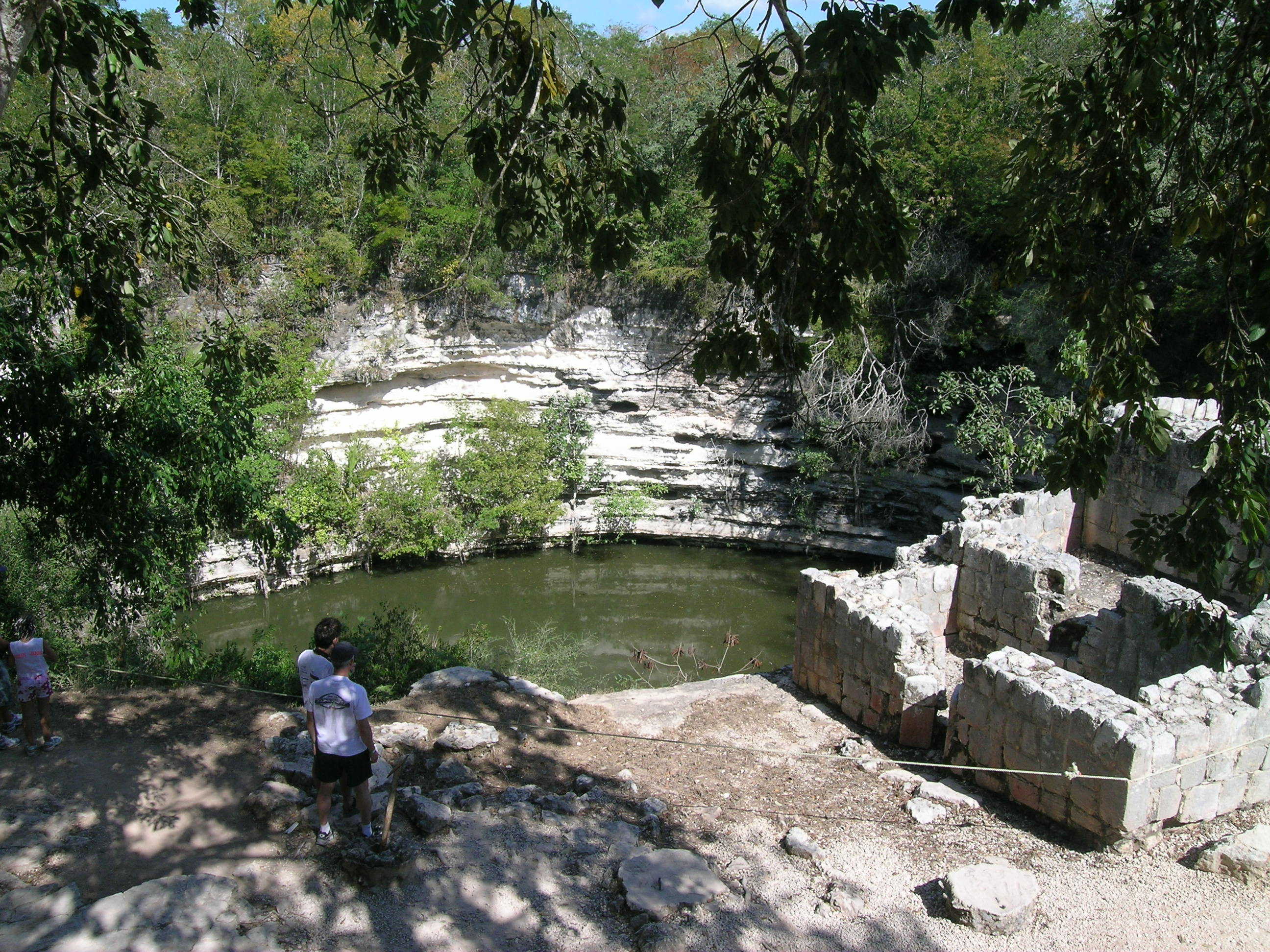
The Sacred Cenote at Chichen Itza

The Sacred Cenote (Spanish: cenote sagrado, Latin American Spanish: [ˌsenote saˈɣɾaðo], "sacred well"; alternatively known as the "Well of Sacrifice") is a water-filled sinkhole in limestone at the pre-Columbian Maya archaeological site of Chichen Itza, in the northern Yucatán Peninsula.

According to both Maya and Spanish post-Conquest sources, pre-Columbian Maya deposited valuables and human bodies into the cenote as a form of sacrifice to the rain god Chaac. Archaeologists and explorers confirmed these accounts by means of a series of 20th century excavations of the Sacred Cenote.

== Description and history ==
The northwestern Yucatán Peninsula is a limestone plain, with no rivers or streams, lakes or ponds. The region is pockmarked with natural sinkholes, called cenotes, which expose the water table to the surface. One of the most impressive of these is the Sacred Cenote, which is 60 metres (200 ft) in diameter and surrounded by sheer cliffs that drop to the water table some 27 metres (89 ft) below. It is connected to Chichen Itza's civic precinct by a 300-metre (980 ft) sacbe, a raised pathway.

According to sources, the Sacred Cenote was a place of pilgrimage for ancient Maya people who would conduct sacrifices into it. As Friar Diego de Landa observed in 1566 after visiting Chichen Itza:

"Into this well they have had, and then had, the custom of throwing men alive as a sacrifice to the gods, in times of drought, and they believed that they did not die though they never saw them again. They also threw into it a great many other things, like precious stones and things which they prized. And so, if this country had possessed gold, it would be this well that would have the great part of it."

== Archaeological explorations of the cenote ==
=== Edward Herbert Thompson ===
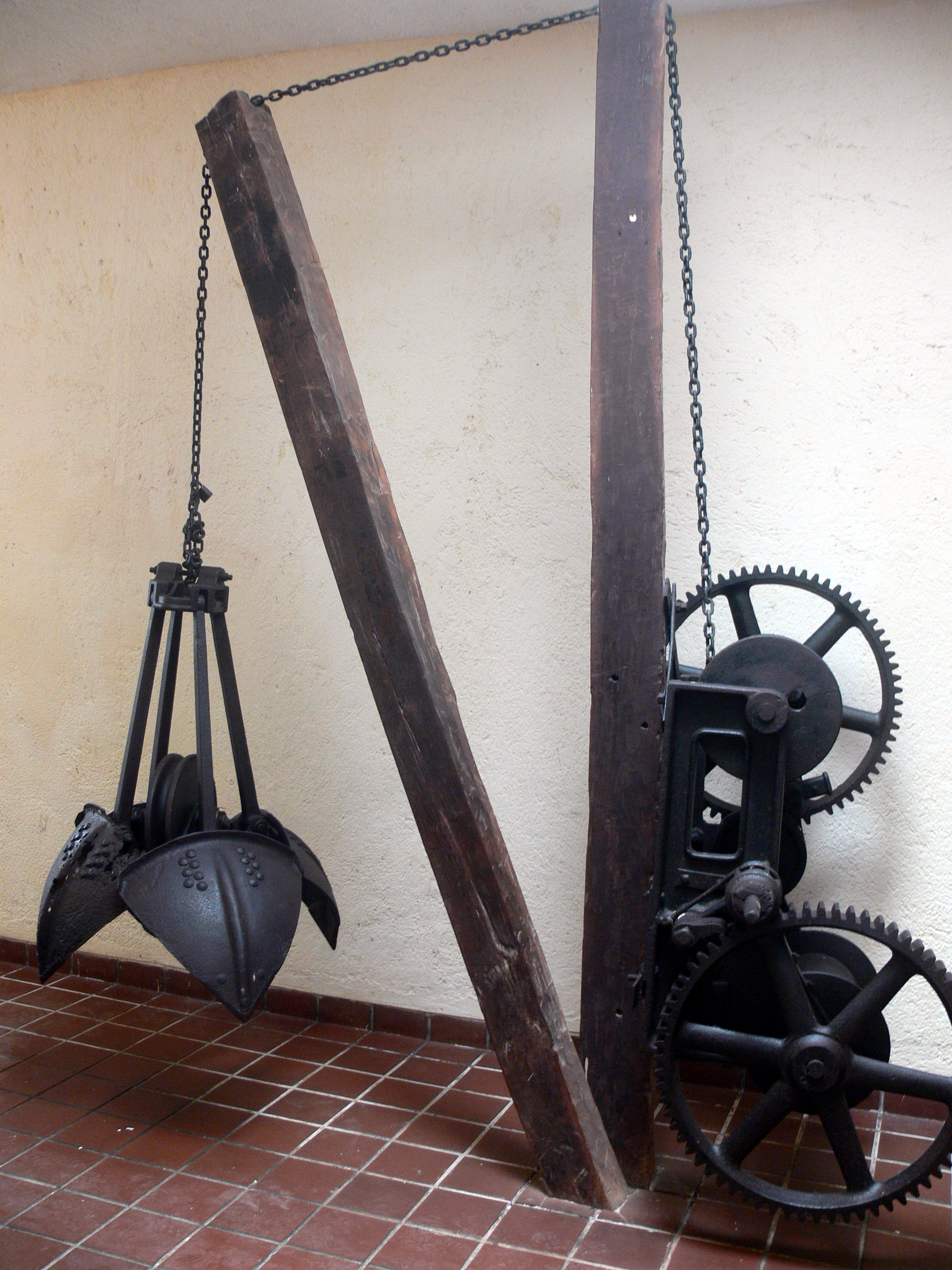
Orange-peel dredge used by Thompson 1904-1910 to excavate the Sacred Cenote.

Most of the major findings in the cenote were made under the supervision of Edward Herbert Thompson, who began dredging in 1904. Much of what is known about the dredging process is derived from Thompson’s personal notes. Thompson received money from Stephen Salisbury III to help him buy the Chichén Itzá excavation site and explore the cenote. Much of Thompson’s findings and research can be found at the Peabody Museum at Harvard University.

A bucket attached to a pulley system was used to dredge the cenote. Much of the beginning work consisted of clearing debris and fallen trees on the top of the water. Leon Cole, a colleague of Thompson, once recorded in his journal, “they made ten hauls in the morning and six or eight in the afternoon.” People would search through the buckets of water looking for artifacts and categorizing them accordingly. Unfortunately, there were several reports of stolen artifacts that could never be found.

Thompson decided to take a break from dredging after Salisbury died. A host of problems, including the Mexican Revolution, and financial issues began to hinder the work effort and damage the morale of the workers. Thompson’s house in Mexico was also burned down, and one of the chests in which he kept his notes and data was destroyed in the fire. By 1923, Thompson was officially done working on the cenote.

=== Diving in the cenote ===
In 1909, Thompson decided to dive in the cenote to explore the floors, assisted by two Greek divers from the Bahamas. He reported limited visibility due to the murky water, and many shifting rocks and trees made the dive hazardous. Thompson found a layer about 5 metres (16 ft) thick of blue pigment that had settled on the ground of the cenote. He described the bottom as, “full of long narrow cracks, radiating from centers as if the glass bottom of a dish had been broken by a pointed instrument. We found down in the cracks and holes a grayish mud in which were imbedded the heavier gold objects, jades, and copper bells in numbers.” He later proudly proclaimed, “I have at last personally trod the bottom of the Cenote.”

=== Exploration under the Mexican authorities ===
In 1961, the Instituto Nacional de Antropologia e Historia (INAH) in conjunction with the National Geographic Society and Club de Exploraciones y Deportes Acauticos de Mexico (CEDAM) conducted another expedition into the cenote. Some of the notable discoveries included an inscribed, gold-sheathed bone, a large chert knife with a gold-sheathed wooden handle, and wooden ear flares with jade and turquoise mosaic.

In 1967–1968, Norman Scott and Román Piña Chán led another expedition. They tried two new methods that many people had suggested for a long time: emptying the water out of the cenote and clarifying the water. Both of these methods were only partially successful. Only about 4 metres (13 ft) of water could be removed, and the water was clarified for only a short amount of time.

== Objects found in the Sacred Cenote ==
Archaeological investigations have removed thousands of objects from the bottom of the cenote, including artifacts made from gold, jadeite, copal, pottery, flint, obsidian, shell, wood, rubber, and cloth, as well as human skeletons.

Many perishable objects were preserved by the cenote. Wooden objects which normally would have rotted were preserved in the water. A great variety of wooden objects have been found including weapons, scepters, idols, tools, and jewelry. Jade was the largest category of objects found, followed by textiles. The presence of jade, gold and copper in the cenote offers proof of the importance of Chichén Itzá as a cultural city center.

None of these raw materials are native to the Yucatán, which indicates that they were valuable objects brought to Chichén Itzá from other places in Central America and then sacrificed as an act of worship. Pottery, stone, bone and shells were also found in the cenote. Archaeologists have found that many objects show evidence of being intentionally damaged before being thrown into the cenote, and have speculated that this intentional damage is meant to be analogous to “killing” the object as a sacrifice.

=== Human sacrifice ===
Certain cenotes contain a large number of human remains, including both males and females, and young children/infants. Evidence from Maya mythology suggests that many young victims (most aged 6 to 12) were male (de Anda, 2007). While the classical images of a female Maya sacrifice being flung alive to drown in a cenote are pervasive, de Anda's (2007) writings on the subject suggest that most sacrificial victims — juveniles who were either purchased or captured while their parents were working in the fields, warriors captured in battle, or elites captured during conflicts with neighboring clans — were usually (though not always) killed prior to being thrown into the cenote, and in many cases, dozens of miles from the cenotes in which their bodies were eventually deposited. Only a certain set of cenotes were used in this way, while others were reserved for domestic purposes (de Anda 2007). This suggests that Maya religious officiants believed that only certain cenotes led to the underworld, and sacrifices placed in others would serve no purpose. It also suggests that the status of the victim as alive or dead was unimportant. The occasional appearance of human remains in non-sacrificial cenotes can be attributed to rare errors in judgement on the part of the shaman. The actual pattern by which a particular victim's remains became interred in which cenotes remains a point of conjecture.

The Franciscan leader Diego de Landa reported that he witnessed live sacrifices being thrown into the cenote at Chichén Itzá. However, his account does not indicate the regularity of this practice.

== See also ==
- Ik Kil, nearby cenote
- List of sinkholes of Mexico

== Bibliography ==
- Adams, Richard E.W. (1991). Prehistoric Mesoamerica (Revised ed.). Norman: University of Oklahoma Press. ISBN 0-8061-2304-4. OCLC 22593466.
- de Anda Alanís, Guillermo (2007). "Sacrifice and Ritual Body Mutilation in Postclassical Maya Society: Taphonomy of the Human Remains from Chichén Itzá's Cenote Sagrado". In Vera Tiesler; Andrea Cucina; Michael Jochim (eds.). New Perspectives on Human Sacrifice and Ritual Body Treatments in Ancient Maya Society. Interdisciplinary Contributions to Archaeology. New York: Springer Verlag. pp. 190–208. ISBN 978-0-387-48871-4. ISSN 1568-2722. OCLC 81452956.
- Cano, Olga (January–February 2002). "Chichén Itzá, Yucatán (Guía de viajeros)". Arqueología Mexicana (in Spanish). IX (53). Mexico: Editorial Raíces: 80–87. ISSN 0188-8218. OCLC 29789840.
- Coggins, Clemency Chase (1984). Cenote of Sacrifice: Maya Treasures from the Sacred Well at Chichen Itza. Austin, TX: University of Texas Press. ISBN 0-292-71098-4.
- Coggins, Clemency Chase (1992). Artifacts from the Cenote of Sacrifice, Chichén Itzá, Yucatán: Textiles, Basketry, Stone, Bone, Shell, Ceramics, Wood, Copal, Rubber, Other Organic Materials, and Mammalian Remains. Cambridge, MA: Peabody Museum of Archaeology and Ethnology, Harvard University; distributed by Harvard University Press. ISBN 0-87365-694-6. OCLC 26913402.
- Landa, Diego de (1941). Alfred M. Tozzer (trans.) (ed.). Landa's Relacion de las Cosas de Yucatan: A Translation. Cambridge, Massachusetts: Peabody Museum. OCLC 625693.
