= Anthropological Literature =

Online database held by the Tozzer Library

- Producer: Tozzer Library, Harvard University (United States)

Access
- Providers: EBSCO Publishing
- Cost: Subscription

Coverage
- Disciplines: Anthropology
- Temporal coverage: the early 19th century to the present
- Geospatial coverage: Worldwide
- No. of records: 620,000
- Update frequency: Monthly

Print edition
- Print dates: 1979-2008
- ISSN: 0190-3373

Links
- Website: library.harvard.edu/services-tools/anthropological-literature
- Title list(s): guides.library.harvard.edu/c.php?g=420132&p=2876355

Anthropological Literature (AL) is an online database of citations to journal articles and articles in edited volumes and symposia held by the Tozzer Library (previously the Peabody Museum of Archaeology and Ethnology), the anthropology library at Harvard University, Cambridge, Massachusetts.

The database offers access to articles and essays on social and cultural anthropology, Old and New World archaeology, physical anthropology and anthropological aspects of related subjects emphasizing Mesoamerican, Native American and Andean archaeology and ethnology.

== History ==
The Peabody Museum began its book collection soon after its founding in 1866. Publication of anthropological literature, in both paper and microfiche formats began in 1979. In 1994, the database became available online through CitaDel, a citation and document delivery service operated by the Research Libraries Group. At that time, it contained over 83,000 citations from approximately 1,000 journals and monographs dating mainly from 1984, with retrospective conversion of an estimated 200,000 article entries reaching back to the late 1880s already underway. Approximately 350,000 citations, formerly in a card catalog, were added in 1997 to the post-1979 records to create the foundation for the current online database. Pre-1984 article indexing was included in several G. K. Hall publications of the catalog of the Peabody Museum Library (renamed the Tozzer Library in 1974 in honor of noted archaeologist Alfred Marston Tozzer). These consist of 53 volumes from 1963, four supplements totaling 31 volumes in 1970, 1971, 1975, and 1979, and a second edition in 1988 of 1122 microfiche, following the closing of the card catalog. There were also two editions of the Tozzer Library Subject Headings, in 1971 and 1981; these remain of value as article records created before Tozzer Library’s adoption of Library of Congress Subject Headings (LCSH) in 1986 retain the older local forms of subject headings.

AL currently indexes more than 700 journals and series in more than fifty, mostly European and Slavic, languages. The database includes articles from journals and series that have ceased publication or are no longer indexed, as well as older articles of some journals not chosen for current indexing. There are some 4,370 sources represented in the database. Approximately 10,000 citations are added annually, in monthly updates. As of 2008, AL contained some 570,000 citations that cover articles published from the early 19th century to the present. The Tozzer library itself holds over 260,000 volumes, including the first book acquired by the Peabody Museum Library.

== Access ==
The database is searchable by various criteria, including author, keyword, date, and title. One of the main access points is the Library of Congress subject heading. Because articles often present recent research in disciplines, it is not unusual for articles to be indexed for which Library of Congress Subject Headings do not yet exist. In such cases, LCSH-style headings are created and applied by the Tozzer library. A list of such headings may be found in the Anthropological Literature section of the library website. When the Library of Congress adopts one of these headings, it is removed from this list. The AL website contains a list of journal titles currently indexed, as well as titles of indexed edited works. In addition to the lists posted on the Anthropological Literature website, a user guide, or tip sheet, is also available. It is written specifically to help users negotiate the AL database in the OCLC FirstSearch interface.

"E-resource access [to Anthropological literature] is limited to Harvard users only, a Harvard ID and University PIN is required. Non-Harvard users should see Subscription Information" at the website.

== See also ==
- List of academic databases and search engines
