= International School of American Archeology and Ethnology in Mexico =

The International School of American Archeology and Ethnology (Escuela Internacional de Arqueología y Etnología Americana) was established in 1910 to promote scientific research relating to the archeology and ethnology of Mexico and adjoining countries. Initial support came from five patrons, each to support the school and provide a director for a one-year period. These were: The Prussian Government; Columbia University; Harvard University; University of Pennsylvania; and The Government of the United States of Mexico. The French Government was also involved in the discussions, but did not take up its place as a patron. The main preparatory work in setting up the school was carried out by Franz Boas, Ezequiel Chávez, and Eduard Seler. The aims of the school were both to conduct original research and to train a new generation of Mexican researchers.

== History ==
The school only operated for four years before closing in the chaos of the Mexican Revolution in 1914. The last director Alfred Tozzer had to leave in May of that year. Despite its short life a considerable amount of work was carried out. This is listed in summary of the work of the school published in 1915. The work included stratigraphic analysis of sites in the Valley of Mexico, in particular of Azcapotzalco by Manuel Gamio, allowing a sequence of civilizations in the same areas to be established; linguistic analysis, focusing on dialects that were in danger of disappearing; and work on folk-lore conducted by Isabel Ramírez Castañeda.

The directors of the school were:

- 1910-1911 Eduard Seler
- 1911-1912 Franz Boas
- 1912-1913 Jorge Engerrand
- 1913-1914 Alfred Tozzer
