= Roland Burrage Dixon =

American anthropologist

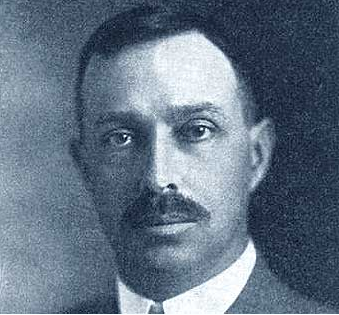
- Born: November 6, 1875; Worcester, Mass
- Died: December 19, 1934 (aged 59)
- Scientific career
- Fields: anthropologist

Roland Burrage Dixon (November 6, 1875 – December 19, 1934) was an American anthropologist.

== Early life and education ==
Born at Worcester, Mass, in 1897 he graduated from Harvard University, where he remained as an assistant in anthropology, taking the degree of Ph. D. in 1900 and then serving as instructor and after 1906 as an assistant professor, rising to professor in 1915. Dixon spent his entire career at Harvard.

== Peabody Museum ==
In 1904, Dixon became Librarian of Harvard's Peabody Museum and has been credited for creating one of the most "comprehensive and functional anthropological libraries in the world". In 1909 he became the Peabody Museum's Secretary and in 1912 its Curator of Ethnology.

== Influence of Franz Boas ==
Dixon studied linguistics and ethnology under Franz Boas after working with Fredric Ward Putnam to obtain his PhD at Harvard. Dixon worked as a member of Boas's Jesup North Pacific Expedition, more specifically with the Huntington Expedition during the 1899-1905 field seasons with Native American groups in northeastern California. Dixon's early papers represent some of the earliest work inspired by Boas' views on culture. However, Boas did not fully articulate his views on culture until 1911, thus Dixon's work is less influenced by Boasian views than that of many of Boas' later students. Indeed, Boas and Dixon's views of culture clashed in numerous instances, in particular, over whether modern 'Stone Age' cultures could be used as analogs for prehistoric archaeological cultures. Boas was strongly opposed to this view. Dixon's approach towards cultures was geographic in orientation, and generally viewed cultures as static entities, with change primarily being induced by migration. Dixon's geographical-historical approach was not taken up by any later anthropologists.

== Collaboration ==
Dixon was fellow Boas student Alfred Kroeber's closest professional colleague from 1897 until about 1906. They coordinated closely, published a number of papers jointly, and had an explicit agreement not to duplicate one another's work, Dixon working on languages and cultures in northeastern California and the northern Sierra Nevada, Kroeber in the remainder of the state.

== Travel and field work ==
Dixon carried out ethnographic research in Siberia and Mongolia (1901); New Zealand, Tasmania, Australia, and Fuji (1909); Mexico (1910); Himalayas, Assam and Upper Burma, the Malay Peninsula and Java, China and Japan (1912-13).

== Ideas on race ==
Dixon was influenced in his ideas about race by his mentor, Putnam, who had been trained by Louis Agassiz and both of these 19th century anthropologists handed down a tradition of viewing the races as separate species. In his 1923 book, The Racial History of Man, Dixon disavowed earlier creationist polygenism while embracing a new evolutionary view of the races as coming from different fossil ancestors giving rise to different species of humans.

== Recognition ==
In 1910, Dixon was elected to the American Philosophical Society. He was vice president of the American Academy of Arts and Sciences in 1910–1911 and president of the American Folklore Society from 1907 to 1908. He was professor at Harvard after 1916 and member of the American Commission to Negotiate Peace (1916–1918) in Paris. Professor Dixon was a contributor to anthropological and ethnological journals.

== Reputation ==
Obituaries by fellow anthropologists ascribed to Dixon an icy and demanding personality, with an attitude of "unsympathetic impartiality, of ruthless condemnation, or of detached approval."

== Selected works ==
- Maidu Myths (1902)
- The Chimariko Indians and Language (1910)
- Maidu Texts (1912)
- Oceanic Mythology (myths of the Indonesian, Oceanian, Australian region, published in 1916)
- Racial History of Man (1923)

== Archive ==
Dixon's ethnology and also his lecture notes and class materials are held at the Harvard University Archives.
