= Edward Herbert Thompson =

American mesoamericanist (1857–1935)

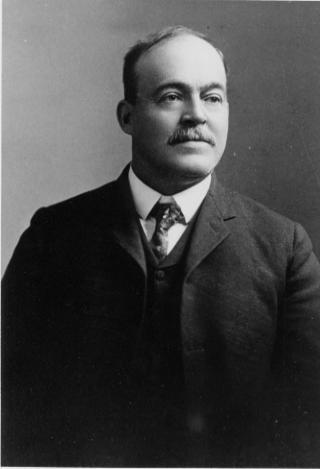
- Edward Herbert Thompson
- Born: September 28, 1857; Worcester, Massachusetts
- Died: May 11, 1935 (aged 77); Plainfield, New Jersey
- Known for: Maya civilization
- Scientific career
- Fields: archaeology

Edward Herbert Thompson (September 28, 1857 – May 11, 1935) was an American-born archaeologist and long-time consul to Yucatán, Mexico.

== Biography ==
Edward H. Thompson was born in Worcester, Massachusetts. Thompson devoted much of his career to study of the Maya civilization.

In 1879, Popular Science Monthly published "Atlantis Not a Myth", an article by Thompson in which he argued that the indigenous civilizations of North and Central America could be remnants of the lost continent of Atlantis. The article attracted the attention of Stephen Salisbury III, a wealthy Worcester resident, Mayanist, and principal benefactor of the American Antiquarian Society. Salisbury, along with fellow AAS members The Rev. Edward Everett Hale and Massachusetts Senator George Frisbie Hoar, persuaded Thompson to move to Yucatán to explore the Maya ruins in exchange for receiving an appointment as American Consul. Thompson arrived in Mérida, Yucatán, in 1885 and lived there for forty years. Although he spoke only English upon his arrival, he learned Spanish and also became fluent in the Yucatec Maya language.

Thompson did early examinations and excavations of several sites in the Maya Puuc region, including Loltun and Labná; at the latter site publishing a monograph on the Maya underground storage containers known as chultunes. He also became the first explorer to find and excavate a small site he called X'Kichmook.

He made a series of plaster casts of Maya sculptures and architecture, particularly from Uxmal and Labná, which were exhibited at the World Columbian Exposition in Chicago, Illinois in 1893.

With the help of Alison Armour, Thompson in 1894 purchased the plantation that included the site of Chichen Itza. He rebuilt the hacienda, which had been destroyed in the Caste War of Yucatán. For thirty years he explored the site, on behalf of the Field Columbian Museum, the American Antiquarian Society, the Peabody Museum at Harvard University and others. His discoveries included the earliest dated carving upon a lintel in the Temple of the Initial Series and the excavation of several graves in the Ossario (High Priest’s Temple).

Thompson is most famous for dredging the Cenote Sagrado (Sacred Cenote) from 1904 to 1911, where he recovered artifacts of gold, copper and carved jade, as well as the first-ever examples of what were believed to be pre-Columbian Maya cloth and wooden weapons. Thompson shipped the bulk of the artifacts to the Peabody Museum. In 1926, the Mexican government seized Thompson's plantation, charging he had removed the artifacts illegally. The Mexican Supreme Court in 1944 ruled in Thompson's favor. Thompson, however, had died in Plainfield, New Jersey in 1935, so the Hacienda Chichen reverted to his heirs.
