= Peabody Museum of Archaeology and Ethnology =

Museum in Cambridge, Massachusetts, US

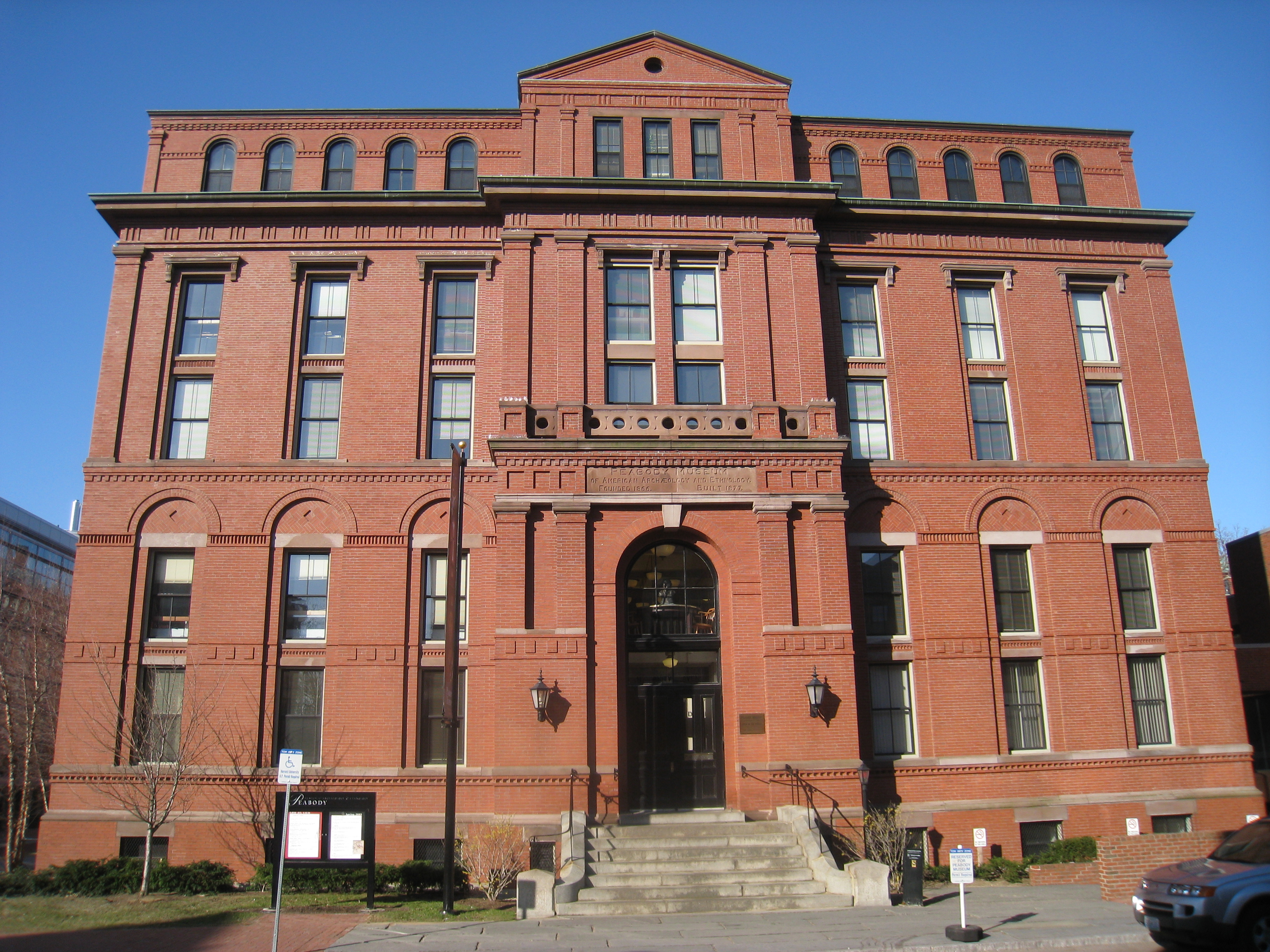
- Peabody Museum of Archaeology and Ethnology, Harvard University

- Location within Boston Location within Massachusetts Location within the United States
- Established: 1866; 160 years ago
- Location: Harvard University; Cambridge, Massachusetts
- Coordinates: 42°22′41.50″N 71°06′53.30″W
- Type: Archaeology museum Ethnographic museum
- Accreditation: American Alliance of Museums
- Founder: George Peabody
- Directors: Jane Pickering; William and Muriel Seabury Howells
- Curators: Ingrid Ahlgren; Ilisa Barbash; Patricia Capone; Diana Loren; Stephanie Mach; Michele Morgan; Diana Zlatanovski
- Owner: Harvard University
- Public transit access: Harvard (MBTA)
- Parking: Street
- Website: peabody.harvard.edu

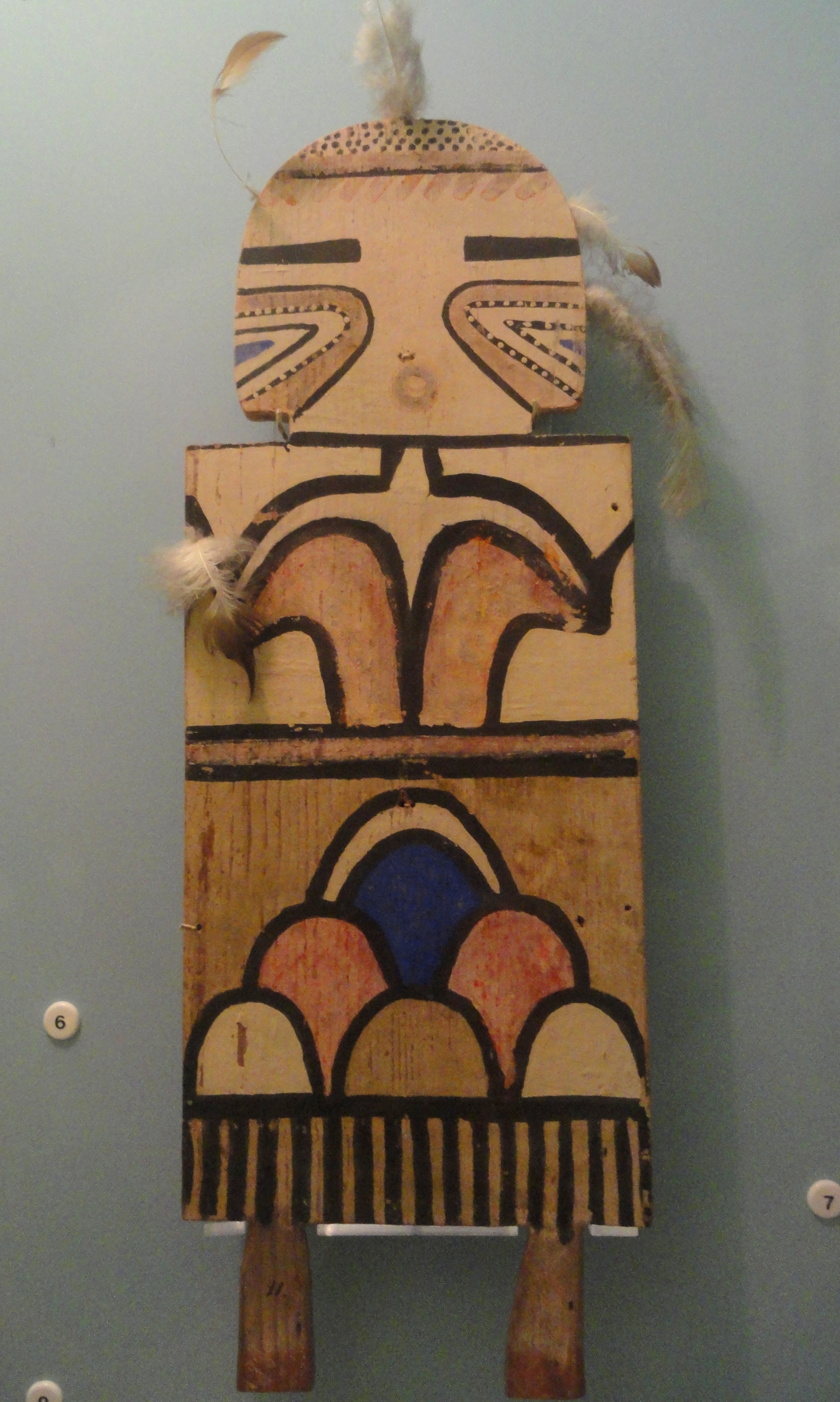
Hopi Paho, for Mamzrauti dance, collected before 1892. Native American collection, Peabody Museum

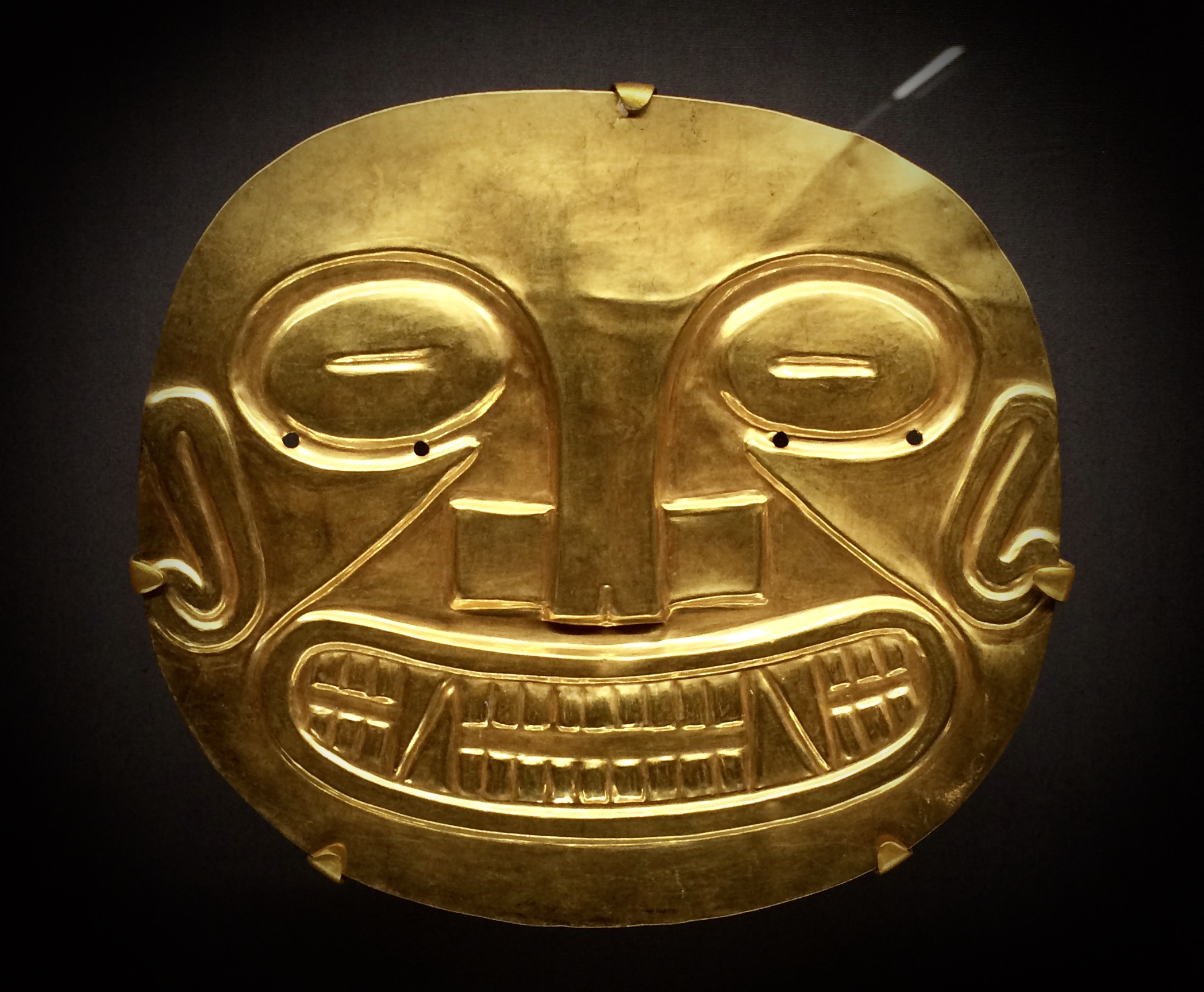
Coclé gold plaque, from Panama, circa 700 AD, excavated by a Peabody Museum expedition, 1930

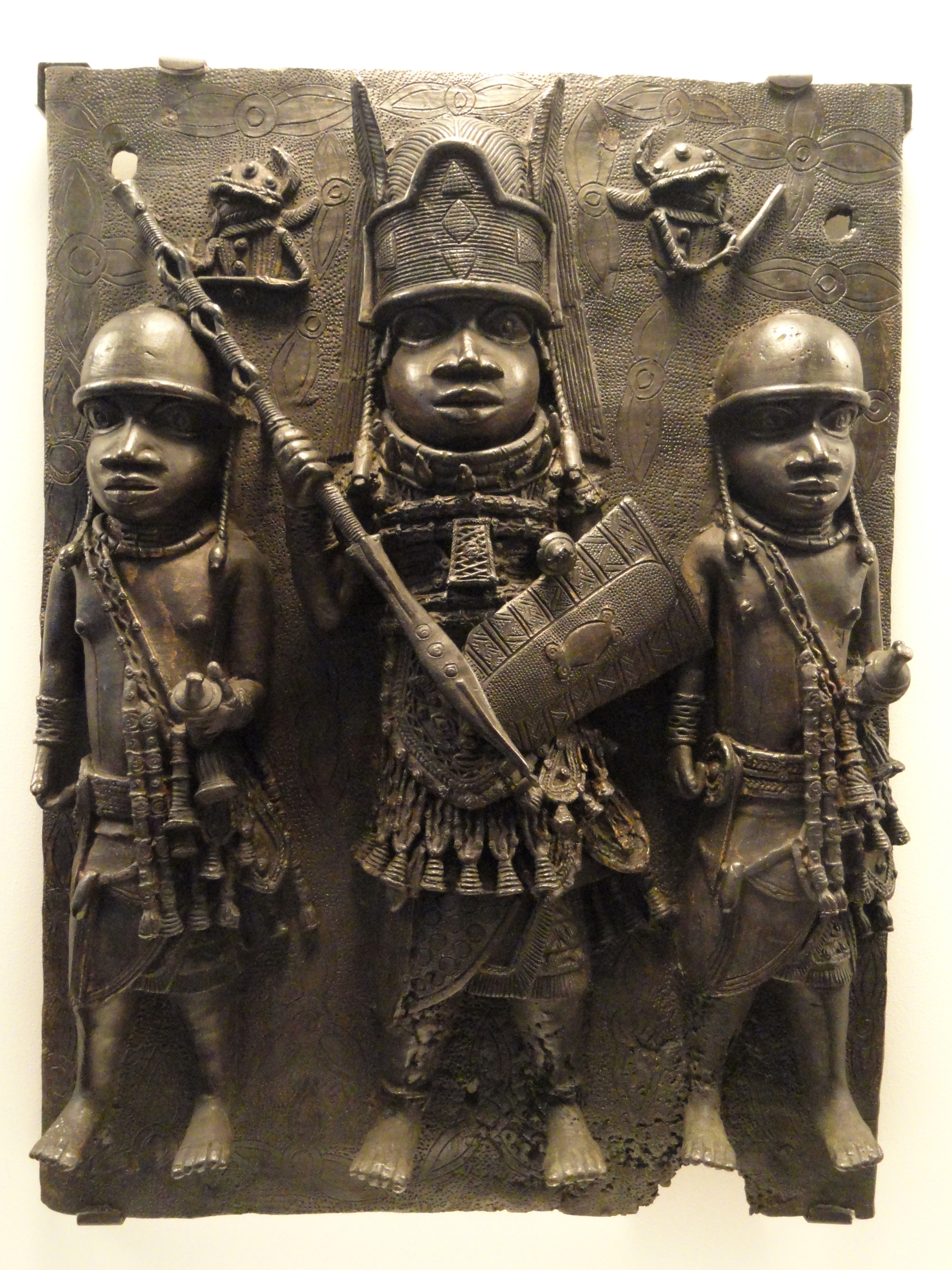
Bronze plaque depicting chief flanked by two warriors, Benin Empire, 1550–1650 AD. African collection, Peabody Museum.

The Peabody Museum of Archaeology and Ethnology is a museum affiliated with Harvard University in Cambridge, Massachusetts, United States. Founded in 1866, the Peabody Museum is one of the oldest and largest museums focusing on anthropological material, with particular focus on the ethnography and archaeology of the Americas. The museum is caretaker to over 1.2 million objects, some 900 feet (270 m) of documents, 2,000 maps and site plans, and about 500,000 photographs. The museum is located at Divinity Avenue on the Harvard University campus. The museum is one of the four Harvard Museums of Science and Culture open to the public.

== History ==
The museum was established through an October 8, 1866, gift from wealthy American financier and philanthropist George Peabody, a native of South Danvers (now eponymously named Peabody, Massachusetts). Peabody committed $150,000 to be used, according to the terms of the trust, to establish the position of Peabody Professor-Curator, to purchase artifacts, and to construct a building to house its collections. Peabody directed his trustees to organize the construction of "a suitable fireproof museum building, upon land to be given for that purpose, free of cost or rental, by the President and Fellows of Harvard College".

In 1867, the museum opened its first exhibition, which consisted of a small number of prehistoric artifacts from the Merrimack Valley in Harvard University's Boylston Hall. In 1877, the long-awaited museum building was completed and ready for occupancy. The building that houses the Peabody was expanded in 1888 and again in 1913.

== Collections ==
Peabody Museum is steward to archaeological, ethnographic, osteological, and archival collections from many countries and covering millions of years of human cultural, social, and biological history, with particular focus on the cultures of North and South America and the Pacific Islands, as well as collections from Africa, Europe, and Asia.

- North America: The Peabody's archaeological and ethnographic holdings from North America form more than a quarter of its collections, with artifacts from many parts of the continent and spanning 10,000 years, including from the earliest excavations in the Northeast and Mimbres collections from the Southwest, the Grace Nicholson Collection of California baskets, and the Lewis and Clark Collection.
- Central America: The museum's Central American collection focuses on archaeological materials from eastern Honduras, Nicaragua, lower Central America, the Caribbean islands, and Central Mexico. The museum hosts a large collection of Mayan material culture from Copán, Holmul, Labna, Piedras Negras, and Uaxactun, stone sculptures from Copán, fine artifacts from the Sacred Cenote of Chichen Itza, and 600 plaster casts of monuments at important Central American sites.
- South America: Some of the Peabody's earliest accessions, collected by Louis Agassiz and his son Alexander Emanuel Agassiz, form the main part of the Peabody's South American ethnographic collections. These include the collection of nineteenth- and twentieth-century featherwork headdresses and ornaments from the Amazon Basin, Andean textiles and the William Farabee collection of Bolivian and Peruvian ceremonial and domestic objects. Important archaeological collections include Chimú, Nazca, and Moche pottery; Inca and Chimú metalwork; and prehistoric-period textiles.
- Asia: The museum's Asian holdings include one of the earliest collections of objects made and used by the Ainu people, Japan's indigenous people; Japanese and Chinese ceramics and porcelains; colorful textiles made by the Kachin people living in northeastern Myanmar (Burma) and contiguous areas of India and China, by the Shan people, and Siberian hide costumes and carved wooden household items. Archaeological materials dominate the Asia collections with an extensive collection of excavated artifacts from Tepe Yahya (Iran) and Tarsus (Turkey).
- Africa: The museum's holdings include over 20,000 items in four significant collections. The three principal collections, gathered from Liberia, southern Cameroon, and Uganda during the first half of the twentieth century, include a diverse range of objects used in daily or ritual life. The fourth collection contains more than 200 musical instruments, including drums and hand pianos. Archaeological collections are represented by George Andrew Reisner's excavations in Egypt and Nubia.
- Oceania: Collected by eighteenth-century Boston merchants, traders, and researchers during their Pacific voyages the 23,000 items of this collection include Easter Island tapa figures and carved wooden statues; Hawaiian feather cloaks and Mahiole feather helmets; Maori carved whakairo door panels, bowls, and human figures; Javanese wayang shadow puppets; and Micronesian canoes and shell jewelry.
- Europe: In addition to Paleolithic collections from France, especially from the site of Abri Pataud where Cro-Magnon man once lived, there are materials from Neolithic through Iron Age Europe, with the notable collection of the Duchess Marie Antoinette of Mecklenburg materials, excavated at Hallstatt Archaeological Site in Vače, Slovenia, surveyed by her mother Princess Marie of Windisch-Graetz. The collection also includes a portion of the French archaeologist and political activist Louis Laurent Gabriel de Mortillet's collections from Central Europe, a Venus figurine from the Grimaldi Man caves in Italy, and Neolithic stone tools from northwestern Europe.
- Paintings and Drawing Collections: Numbering nearly 200 paintings and 950 works on paper, the collection of artwork is a complementary addition to the object collections. About half, representing the David I. Bushnell, Jr. Collection of American Art, contains works by Alexander de Batz, George Catlin, Charles Bird King, George Gibbs, Edward Kern, John Webber, and over 130 oils, watercolors, and drawings by Seth Eastman, the pictorial historian of native North Americans. There are also painted portraits of Native Americans by Elbridge Ayer Burbank, some of which are the only extant representations of the subjects. Other significant pieces include the works of Jean Charlot depicting the monumental architecture of Mesoamerica, twentieth-century works by Native American artists, an extensive series of Inuit prints, and thirty-eight works depicting people and places in India and Tibet by Andre Chéronnet Champollion.
- Archival Collections: The holdings of both the records and photographic archives present another dimension to the scholarly work of the anthropologists and archaeologists whose collected artifacts reside in the Peabody. The papers and manuscripts housed in the archives include institutional (departmental and Museum) records, special collections, and materials associated with over 70 anthropological/archaeological expeditions, dozens of faculty and researchers, and other research projects. The daguerreotypes, colored transparencies, and other photographic images in the Peabody's collections number about half a million from the archaeology and ethnology of many countries, with particular emphasis in Native American cultures and portraits, Mexico, northern Central America, China and Southwest Asia, Africa, and pre-Columbian objects and art.
- Osteological Collections: The osteological collections of the Peabody Museum derive from more than eighty countries on six continents and include human and non-human primate remains, fossils, and casts. These are collected mainly from the Americas, Eurasia, and Africa. Approximately 40 percent of the more than 18,500 human and non-human individuals (MNI) currently represented in the collections are from the United States. The museum also has anatomical teaching and hominid cast collections. Despite the passage of the Native American Graves Protection and Repatriation Act in 1990, the Peabody Museum is estimated to hold more than 6100 Native American remains that have not been repatriated.

The museum's collections also include a feejee mermaid purchased by P.T. Barnum.

== Permanent exhibitions ==
- Change & Continuity: Hall of the North American Indian explores North American cultures through the objects produced by indigenous peoples of the Americas of the nineteenth century. The Changes and Continuity exhibit examines historical interactions between Native peoples and Europeans during a period of profound social change.
- Day of the Dead/Día de los Muertos includes of a Day of the Dead altar or offrenda in the "Encounters with the Americas" gallery. It represents the holiday's Aztec origins and the Roman Catholic symbols incorporated into the tradition.
- Digging Veritas: The Archaeology and History of the Indian College and Student Life at Colonial Harvard uses archaeological finds from Harvard Yard, historic maps, and other sources to reveal how students lived at colonial Harvard, and the role of the Indian College in Harvard's early years.
- Encounters with the Americas explores the native cultures of Latin America before and after Christopher Columbus' arrival in 1492.

== Temporary exhibitions ==
- Wiyohpiyata: Lakota Images of the Contested West: in this exhibition, co-curators Castle McLaughlin and Lakota artist Butch Thunder Hawk use ambient sound, motion, scent, and historic and contemporary Great Plains art to animate nineteenth century Lakota drawings from a warrior's ledger collected at the Little Bighorn battlefield. This exhibit presents Lakota perspectives on westward expansion while exploring culturally-shaped relationships between words, objects, and images.
- All the World Is Here: Harvard's Peabody Museum and the Invention of American Anthropology traces the Peabody Museum's early days under its second director, Frederic Ward Putnam, including its role in the 1893 World's Fair, with over 600 objects from Asia, Oceania, and the Americas.
