= Kiuic =

Maya site in Yucatán, México

Coordinates: 20.09285°N 89.56376°W

- K'íiwik
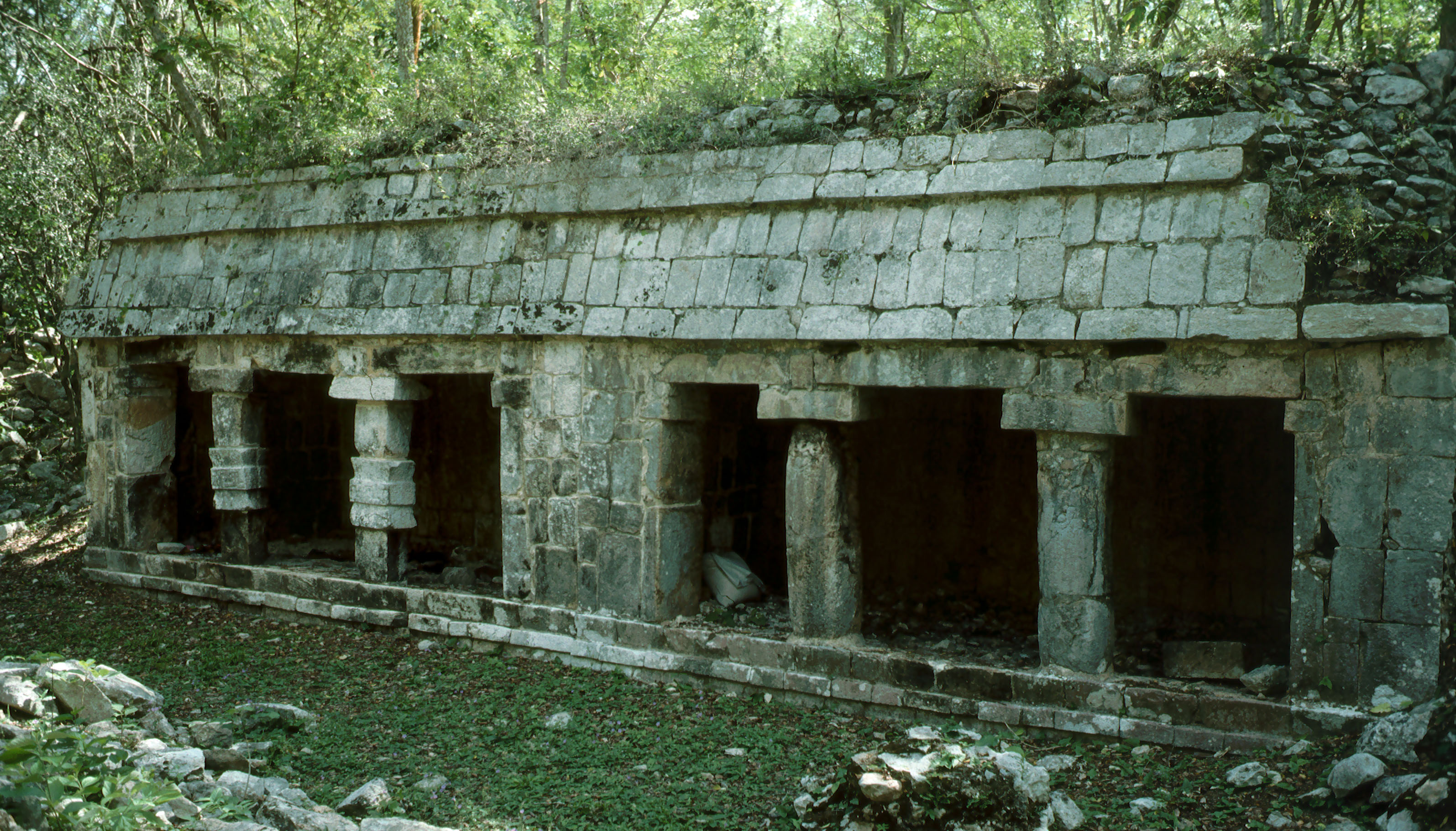
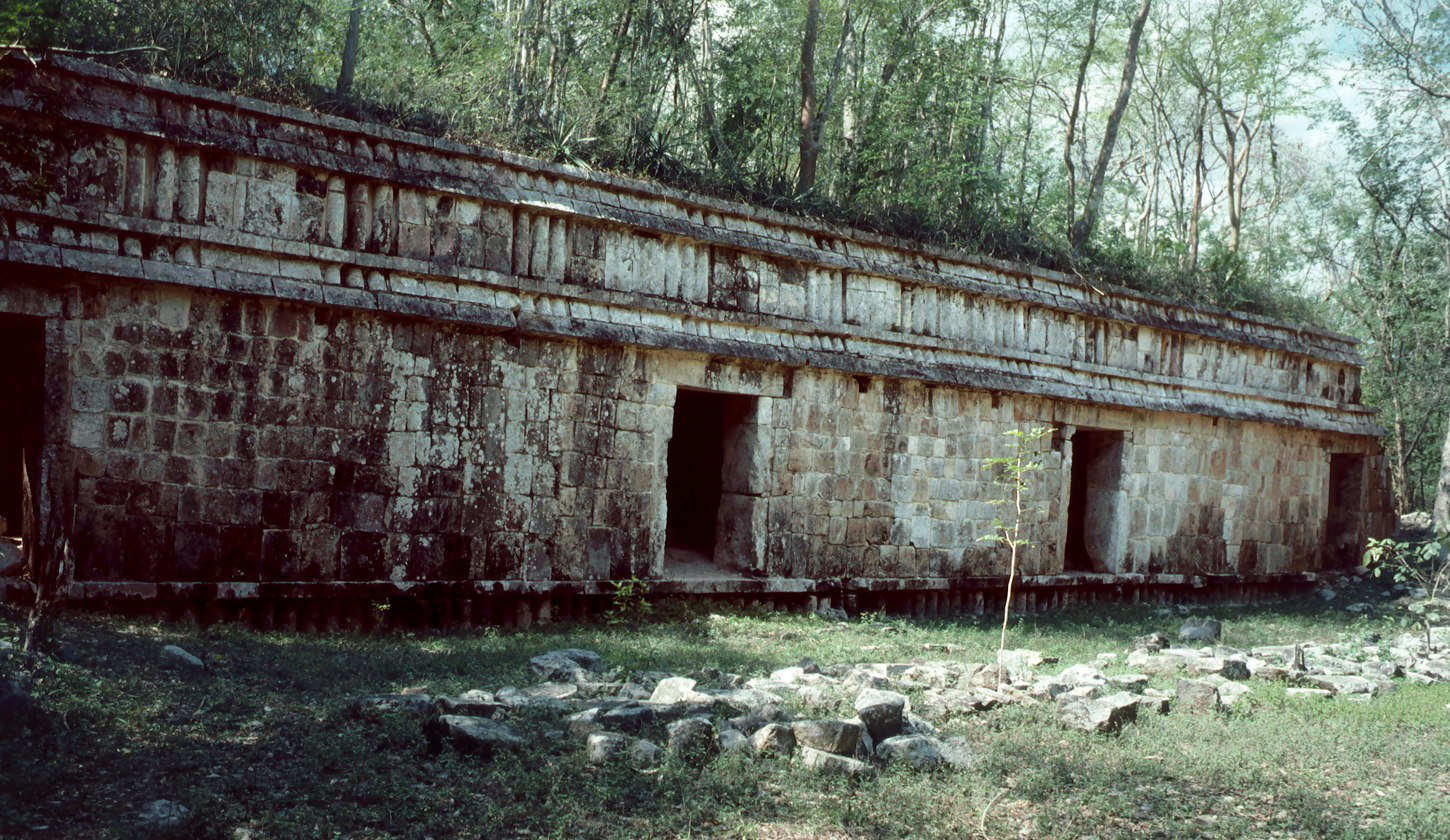
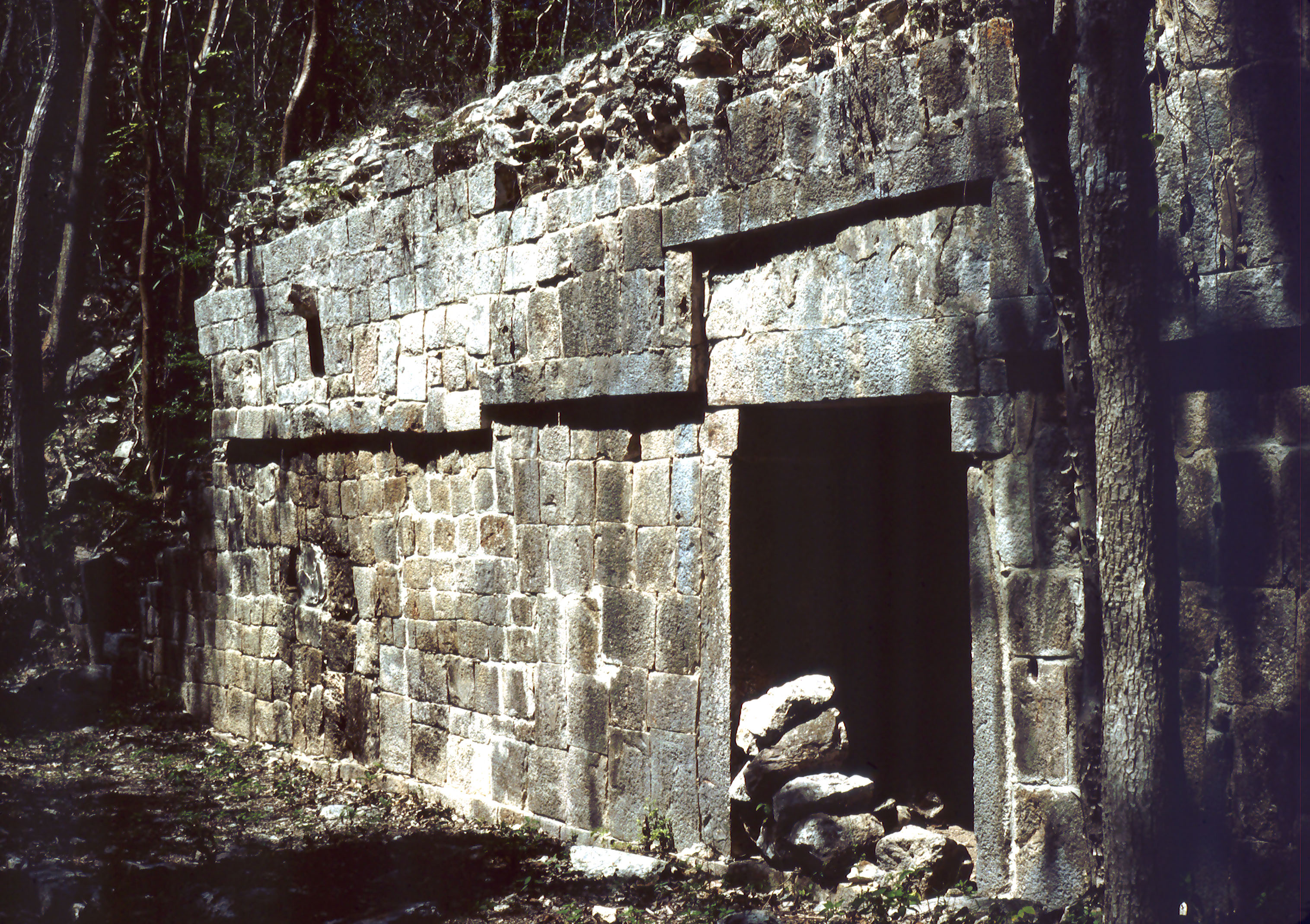
- Ancient Maya palaces and buildings in Kiuic

- Location within Mexico Location within Yucatán (state)
- Type: Ancient Maya site
- Periods: Middle Preclassic - Late Classic
- Cultures: Maya civilization
- Location: Mexico
- Region: Puuc

History
- Built: 800 BC - 900 AD
- Abandoned: 900 AD

Site notes
- Architectural style: Puuc

Kiuic is a Maya archaeological site in the Puuc region of Yucatán, Mexico that was a large civic-ceremonial center at its peak during the Late Classic period. The occupation of Kiuic dates back to the middle Preclassic period between 800 BC which makes it one of the oldest sites within the Puuc region and it had continuous development until the late classical period. It was between the years 600 and 850 AD when it reached its peak of development and became a major center of power of the Puuc region.

The archaeological site of Kiuic is located inside a biocultural reserve in the Puuc region, municipality of Oxkutzcab in the state of Yucatán, Mexico, approximately 8 kilometers south of the Mayan cities of Labná, Xlapak, Sayil, and Huntichmul.

== History ==
Kiuic (/kjuˈiːk/ kyoo-EEK) was a Maya city of the Late and Terminal Maya Classic Periods, with evidence of earlier occupation dating back to 800 BC in the middle Preclassic period of Mesoamerica. It was abandoned by the Maya around 880 CE. The site is well-preserved, and in that regard compared by archaeologists to Pompeii.

== Archaeology ==
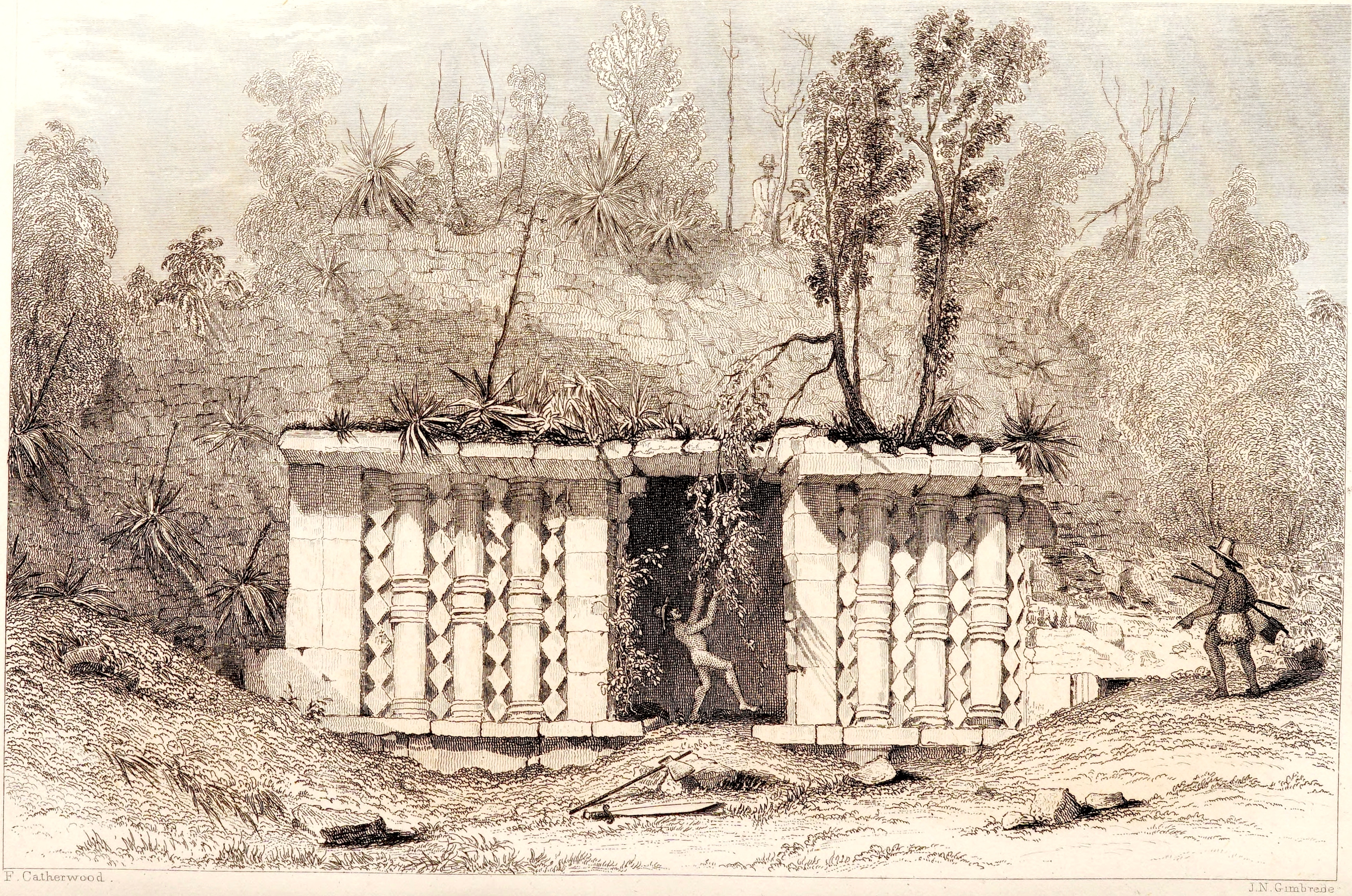
So called "Diamantes" building in the early 1840s

First documented in print by John Lloyd Stephens and Frederick Catherwood in 1843, during their exploration they recorded the existence of several structures and made some illustrations of some of the buildings. The site was visited by later Mayanists including Teoberto Maler. The name Kiuic was given to the site at the time of its discovery, it comes from the word K'íiwik, which in the Maya language means plaza. The Maya city of Kiuic is made up of several ceremonial and residential complexes with several plazas and courtyards containing numerous pyramidal bases, stone mounds, and palaces built in the Puuc architectural style. The architectural groups of Kiuic are Chulul, Yaxché, Kuche, On, Chacah, Catzim and Balché. The Yaxché group is one of the largest at the site with approximately 24 structures distributed at the Icim, Dzunun, and Ulum plazas. Evidence of the earliest occupation at Kiuic has been excavated in the Dzunun plaza, dating the beginning of the site's development to around 800 BC.

The site has been undergoing archaeological exploration since 2000, in part by Millsaps College archaeologists. Kiuic was extensively discussed in a PBS Nova and National Geographic special.
