= Xlapak =

Maya archaeological site in the Yucatan Peninsula of Mexico

Coordinates: 20°10′25″N 89°36′30″W

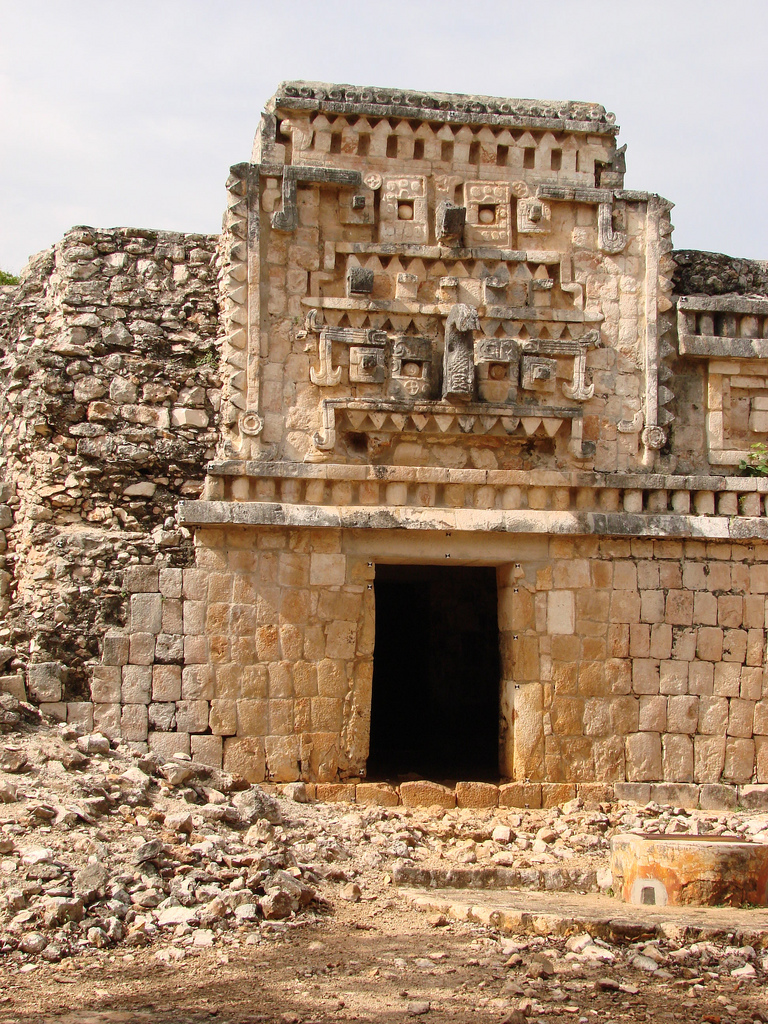
A palace at Xlapak

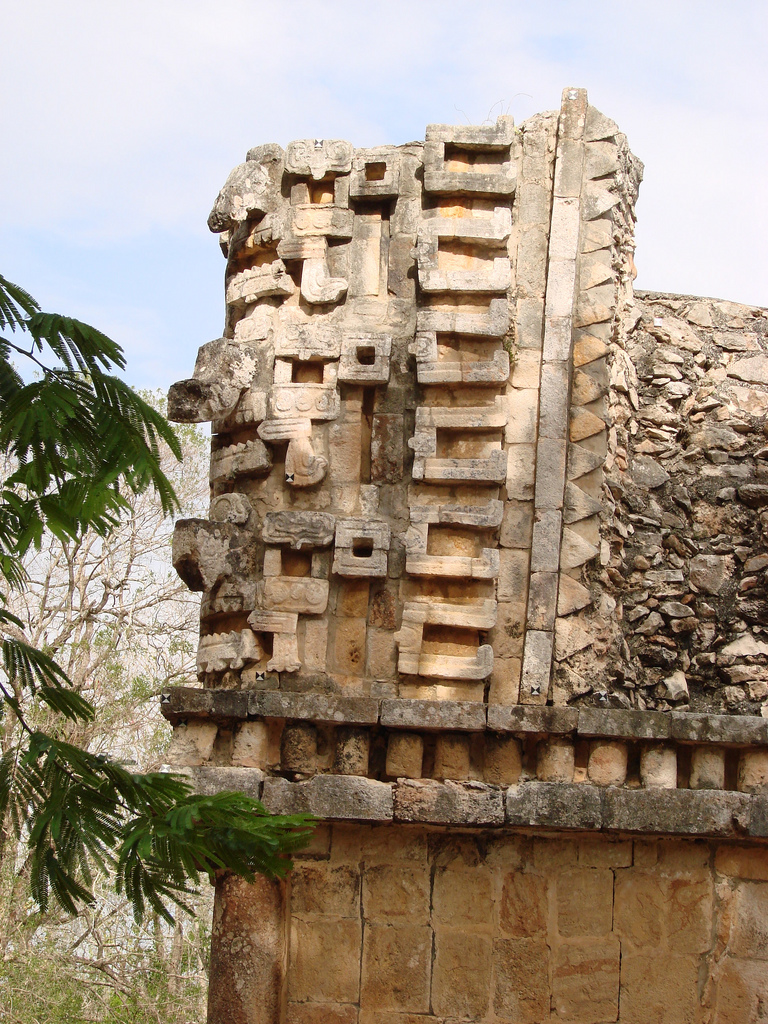
Masks of the rain god Chaac at Xlapak.

Xlapak (or Xlapac) is a small Maya archaeological site in the Yucatan Peninsula of southeastern Mexico. It is located in the heart of the Puuc region, about 4 kilometres (2.5 mi) from the archaeological site of Labná and a similar distance from Sayil, lying directly between the two sites. It consists of three main groups in a valley of the Puuc Hills in Yucatán State, a region of karst limestone forming the only major topographical feature of the peninsula. The closest town is Oxkutzcab, about 30 kilometres (19 mi) to the northeast.

The site dates from the Late to Terminal Classic periods and was sited in an area suitable for agriculture.

Restoration at Xlapak, and other nearby archaeological sites, was carried out in the first half of the 20th century by the Mexican Instituto de Antropologia e Historia (Institute of Anthropology and History). Further archaeological investigation was carried out in 1965 under the direction of César A. Sáenz.

== The site ==
The site core is located in the flat valley bottom, while in the surrounding hills the remains of perishable structures have been found.

The main feature of Group 1 is the Palace, which consists of nine rooms with decorated facades. Another palace is located in Group 2, it is decorated with columns. The architecture is an example of the ostentatious style of the Classic or Fluorescent Puuc, in common with the nearby sites of Sayil, Labna, Kabah, and Uxmal. Typical of this style are the highly decorated upper portions of the buildings that extend above the ceiling height. The decorations at Xlapak are well preserved and include masks of the Yucatec Maya rain god Chaac.
