= Akab Dzib =

- Wak Puh Ak Nah (Yucatec Maya)
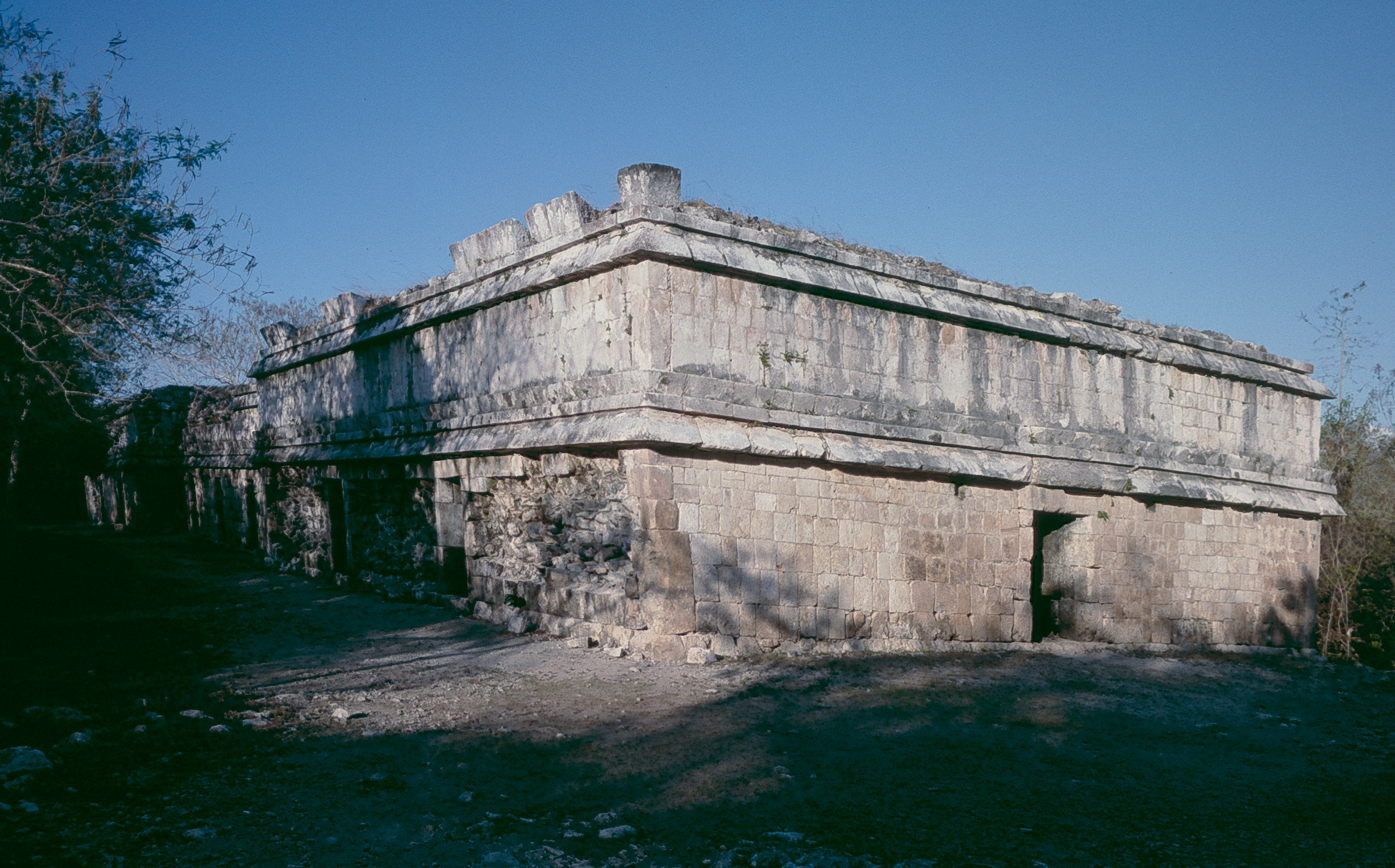
- Interactive map of Akab Dzib
- Type: Maya structure
- Location: Chichen Itza, Mexico

History
- Built: c. 869
- Built for: Yahawal Cho' K’ak’

Site notes
- Height: 6 metres (20 ft)
- Architectural style: Puuc
- Governing body: Instituto Nacional de Antropología e Historia

UNESCO World Heritage Site
- Type: Cultural
- Designated: 1988 (12th session)
- Part of: Pre-Hispanic City of Chichen-Itza
- Reference no.: 483
- Region: Latin America and the Caribbean

The Akab Dzib is a pre-Columbian structure at the Maya archaeological site of Chichen Itza, located in the central-northern portion of the Yucatán Peninsula of present-day Mexico.

The building is formally catalogued in archaeological surveys as Chichen Itza Structure 4D1; alternative spellings include Akab Tzib and Akabdzib. In modern Maya orthography, the building's given name renders as Akab' Tz'ib' or Akab' Tz'iib'.

"Akab Dzib" means, in Mayan, "The House of Mysterious Writing". An earlier name of the building, according to a translation of glyphs in the Casa Colorada, is Wa(k)wak Puh Ak Na, "the flat house with the excessive number of chambers” and it was the home of the administrator of Chichén Itzá, Yahawal Cho' K’ak’ from the kokom dnyasty.

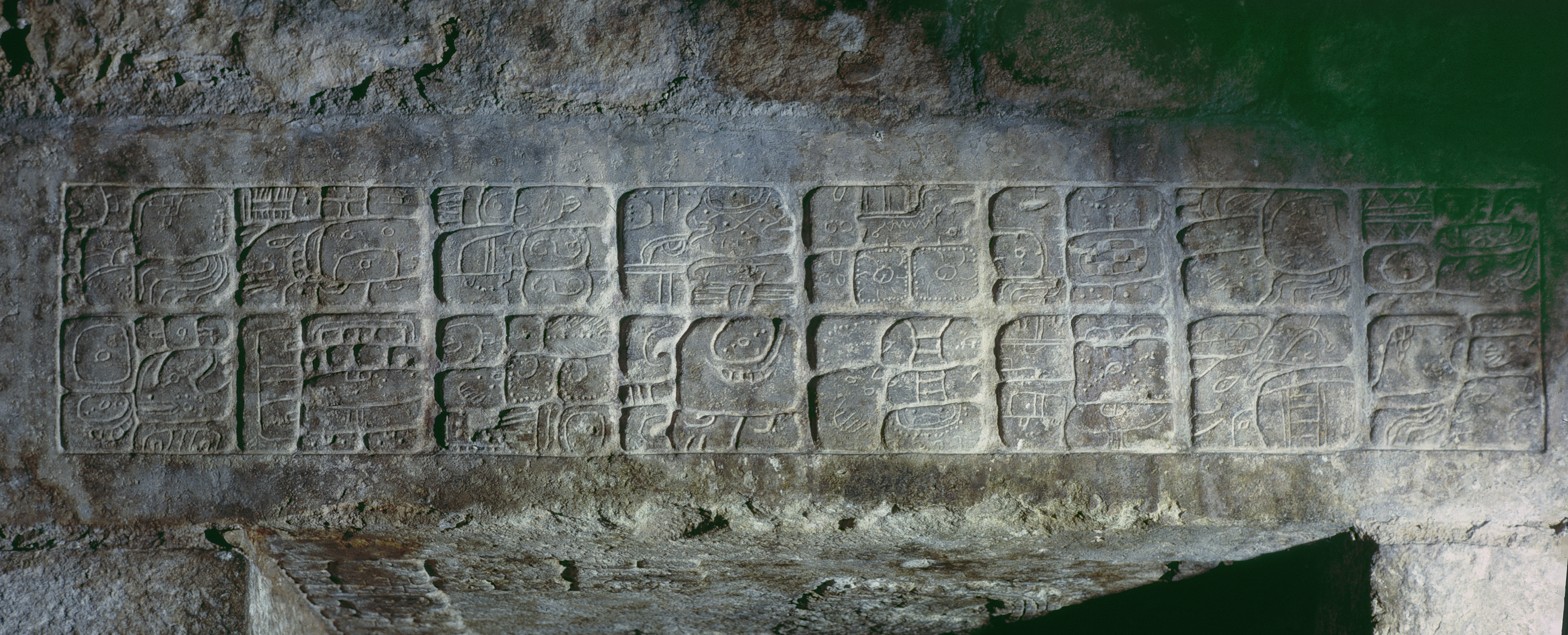
Akab Dzib lintel.

== Architecture ==
The INAH completed a restoration of the building in 2007. Akab Dzib is dated at around 869 AD and was built in the architectural style of the Puuc region. It is relatively short, only 6 m (20 ft) high, and is 50 m (160 ft) in length and 15 m (49 ft) wide. The long, western-facing facade has seven doorways. The eastern facade has only four doorways, broken by a large staircase that leads to the roof. This apparently was the front of the structure, and looks out over what is today a steep, but dry, cenote. The southern end of the building has one entrance. The door opens into a small chamber and on the opposite wall is another doorway, above which on the lintel are intricately carved glyphs—the “mysterious” or “obscure” writing that gives the building its name today. Under the lintel in the doorjamb is another carved panel of a seated figure surrounded by more glyphs. Inside one of the chambers, near the ceiling, is a painted hand print.

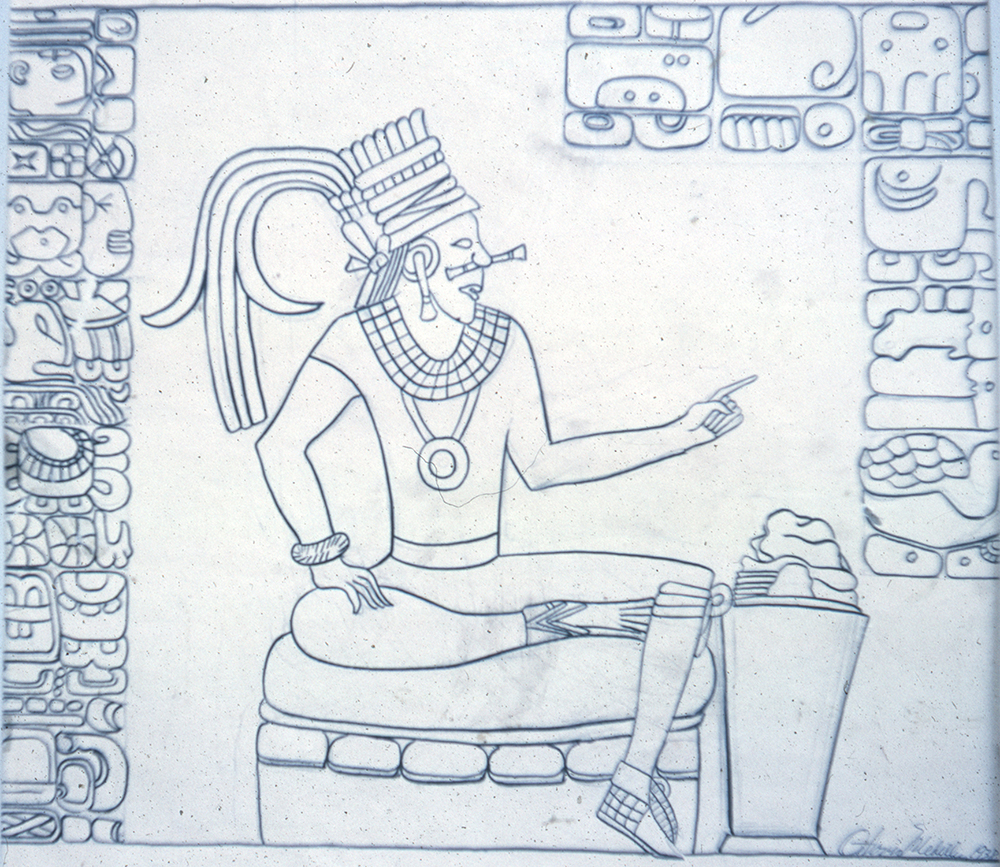
Relief of a lintel from Akab Dzib.
