= Xculoc =

Village in Mexico

Coordinates: 20°11′N 89°50′W

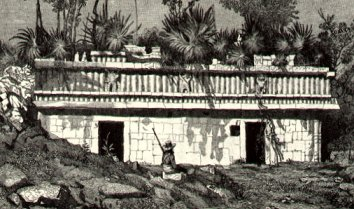
Puuc style Mayan building at Xculoc, in 1841 drawing by Frederick Catherwood.

Xculoc is a village in Campeche, Mexico. This settlement of Maya people is located 20 kilometres south of Uxmal and the same distance west of Sayil.

Ancient Mayan Classic Period Puuc style Mayan building ruins are located in Xculoc.
