= Kabah (Maya site) =

Coordinates: 20°14′54.33″N 89°38′50.27″W

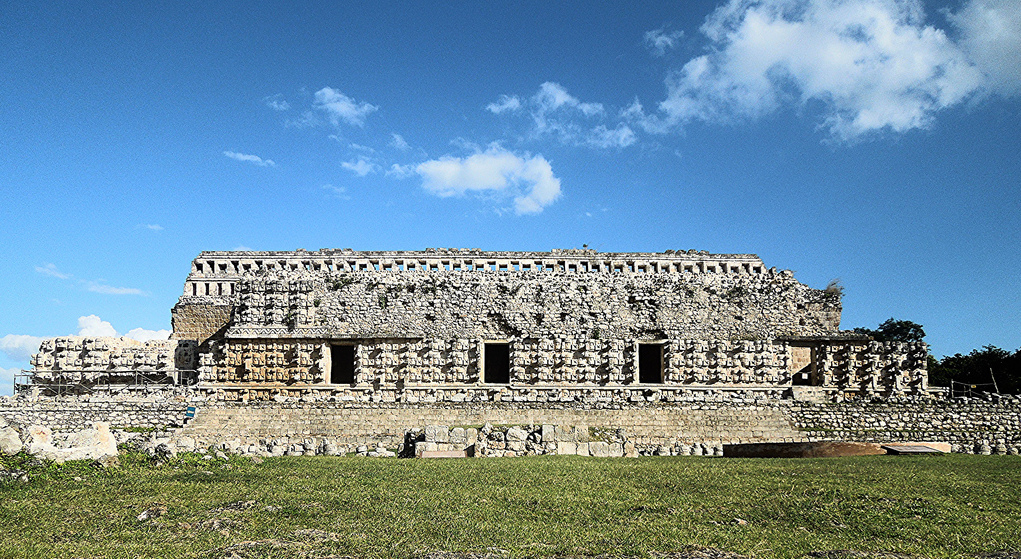
- Codz Pop palace
- Interactive map of Kabah
- Periods: Late Classic to Terminal Classic
- Cultures: Maya civilization

History
- Built: 7th century and 11th centuries CE

UNESCO World Heritage Site
- Official name: Pre-Hispanic Town of Uxmal
- Criteria: Cultural: i, ii, iii
- Reference: 791
- Inscription: 1996 (20th Session)

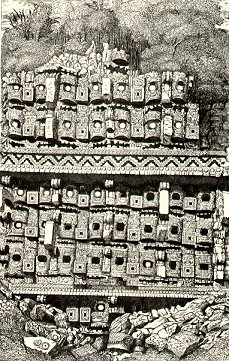
Kabaah, portion of Temple of the Masks fascade, drawn by Frederick Catherwood, published 1843

Kabah (also spelled Kabaah, Kabáh, Kahbah and Kaba) is a Maya archaeological site in the Puuc region of western Yucatan, south of Mérida. It was incorporated together with Uxmal, Sayil and Labna as a UNESCO World Heritage Site in 1996.

Kabah is south of Uxmal, connected to that site by an 18 kilometres (11 miles) long raised causeway 5 metres (16 feet) wide with monumental arches at each end. Kabah is the second largest ruin of the Puuc region after Uxmal.

The site is on Fed. 261, approximately 140 kilometres (87 miles) south from Mérida, Yucatán, towards Campeche, Campeche, and is a popular tourism destination. Ruins extend for a considerable distance on both sides of the highway; many of the more distant structures are little visited, and some are still overgrown with forest. As of 2003, a program was ongoing to clear and restore more buildings, as well as archeological excavations under the direction of archeologist Ramón Carrasco.

Kabah was declared a Yucatán state park in 1993.

== History ==
The name Kabah or Kabaah was first suggested by Estanislao Carrillo in 1846 and is usually taken to be archaic Maya language for "strong hand". This is a pre-Columbian name for the site, mentioned in the Book of Chilam Balam of Chumayel. An alternative name is Kabahaucan or "royal snake in the hand," suggested by Teoberto Maler.

The area was inhabited from the mid-3rd century BCE. Most of the architecture now visible was built between the 7th century and 11th centuries CE. J. E. S. Thompson used a sculpted doorjamb from Structure 2C6 to suggest the date of the ruin to be 879 CE, probably around the city's apex. Another inscribed date found at the site is one of the latest carved in the Maya Classic style, in 987 CE.

== Archaeological site ==
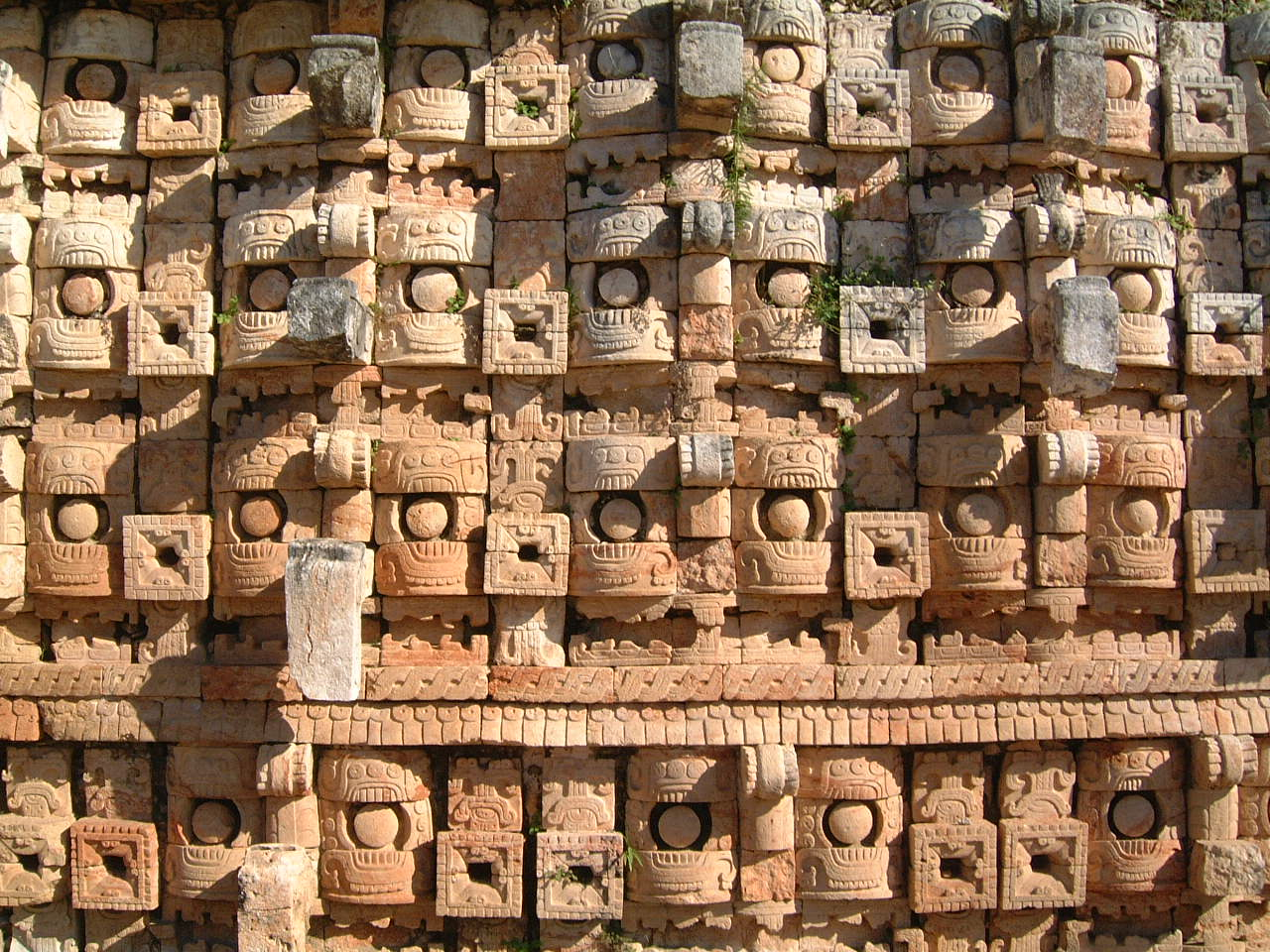
Palace of the Masks detail. 2002 photo

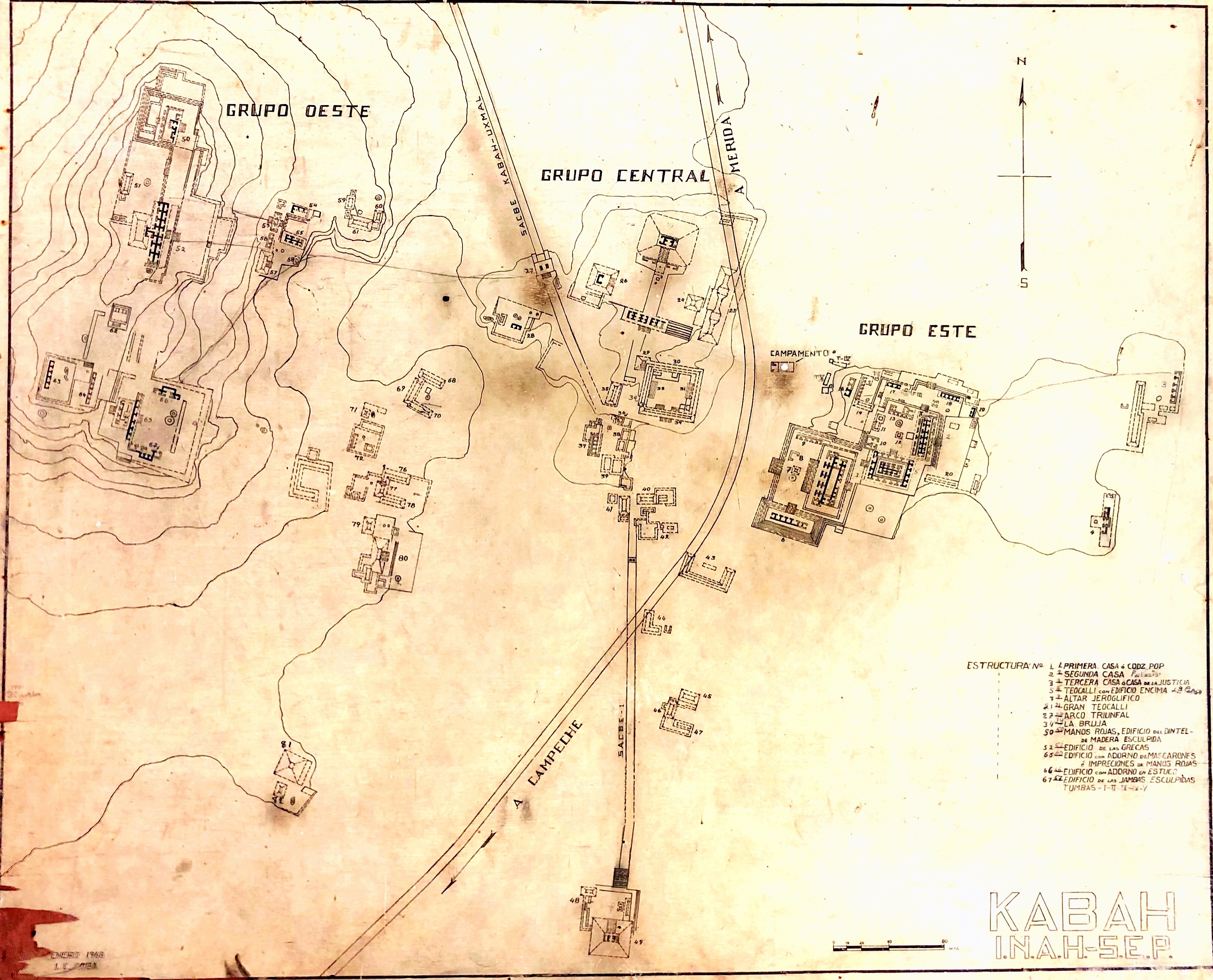
Map of the Kabah Maya archeological zone

The most famous structure at Kabah is the "Palace of the Masks", the façade decorated with hundreds of stone masks of the long-nosed rain god Chaac; it is also known as the Codz Poop, meaning "Rolled Matting", from the pattern of the stone mosaics. This massive repetition of a single set of elements is unusual in Maya art, and here is used to unique effect.

Masks of the rain god abound on other structures throughout the site. Copal incense has been discovered in some of the stone noses of the raingods. The emphasis placed on Chaac, the Protector of the Harvest, both here and at other neighboring Puuc sites, stemmed from the scarcity of water in the region. There are no cenotes in this dryer, northern part of the Yucatán, so the Maya here had to depend solely on rain.

The site also has a number of other palaces, low stone buildings, and step pyramid temples. While most are in the Puuc Maya style, some show Chenes elements. The site had a number of sculpted panels, lintels, and doorjambs, most of which have been removed to museums elsewhere. The sculptures mostly depict the site's rulers and scenes of warfare.

The first detailed account of the ruin was published by John Lloyd Stephens and Frederick Catherwood in 1843.

=== Northwest Group ===
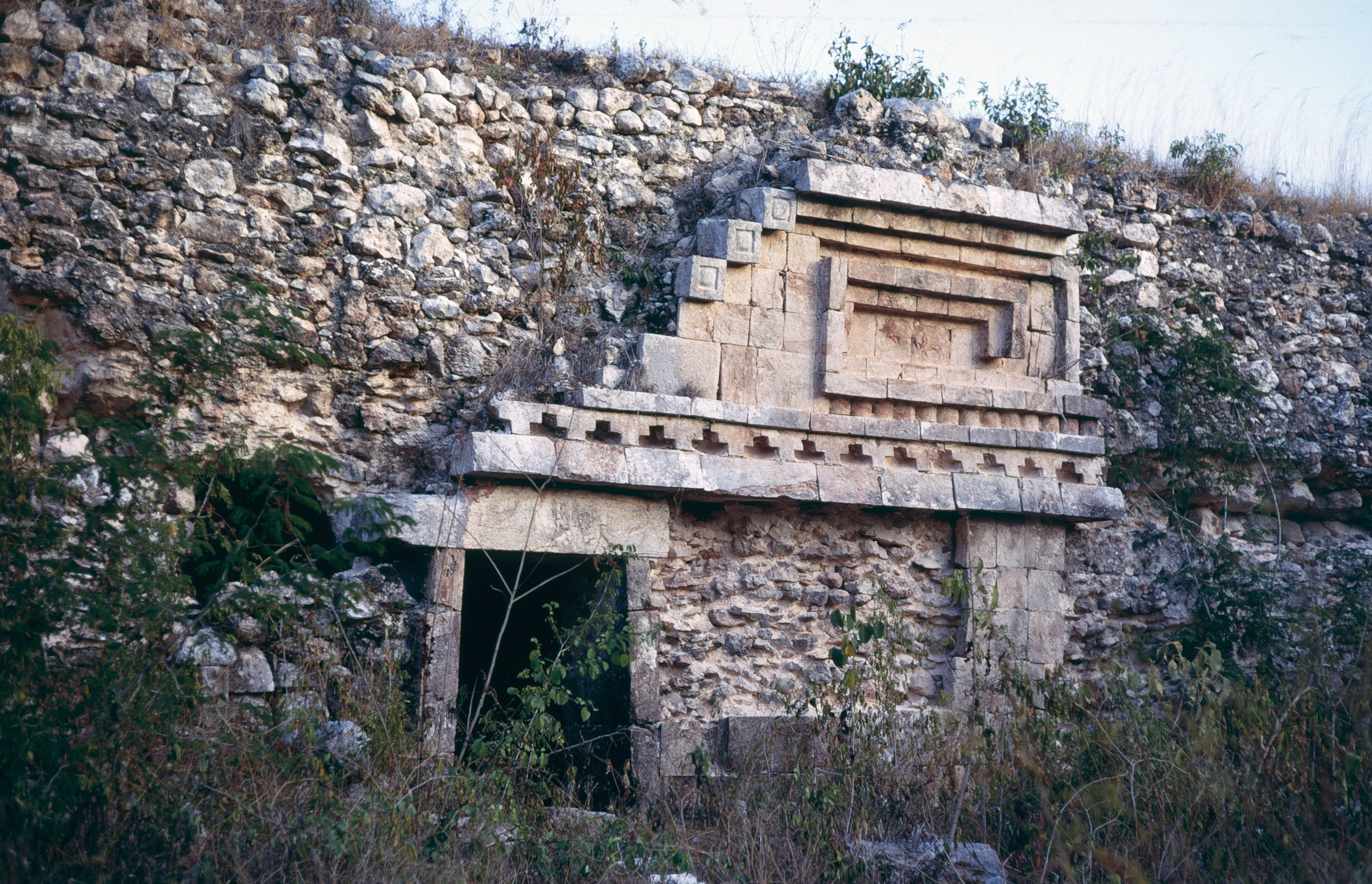
Kabah, Building 1A2. 1971 photo

The Northwest group consists of structures 1A1 and 1A2, a hilltop group with several smaller ancillary structures resting on the crest of the ridge at the western edge of the site. The group looks over the city to the east and directly faces the principal pyramid temple (Structure 1B2).

=== West Group ===
The West Group consists of Structures 1A7 and 1A8 as well as the Court of Structures 2A1, consisting of Structures 2A1, 2A2, and 2A3.

=== East or Palace Group ===
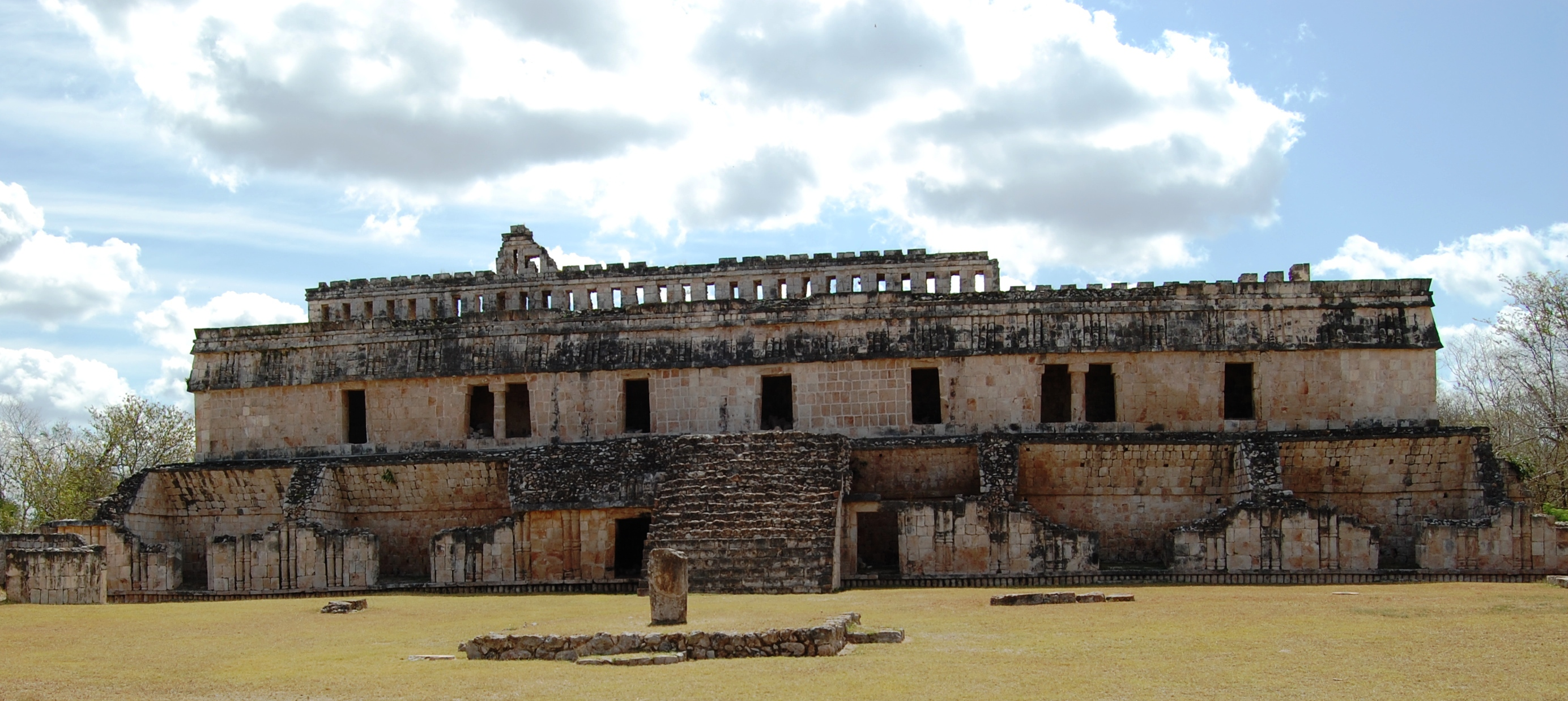
The "Palace", building 2C2. 2007 photo

The East Group consists of Structures 2B1-3, Structures 2C1, 4, and 5, and Structures 2C2, 2C3, 2C6 (Codz Poop), and 2C7. This is the largest and presumably most important group of structures at Kabah. These buildings are also the best preserved. The primary orientation of the assemblage is toward the west, looking over the central part of the city, and at the Northwest and West Groups on the western ridge with its main approach being from the west.

=== Various Other Groups ===
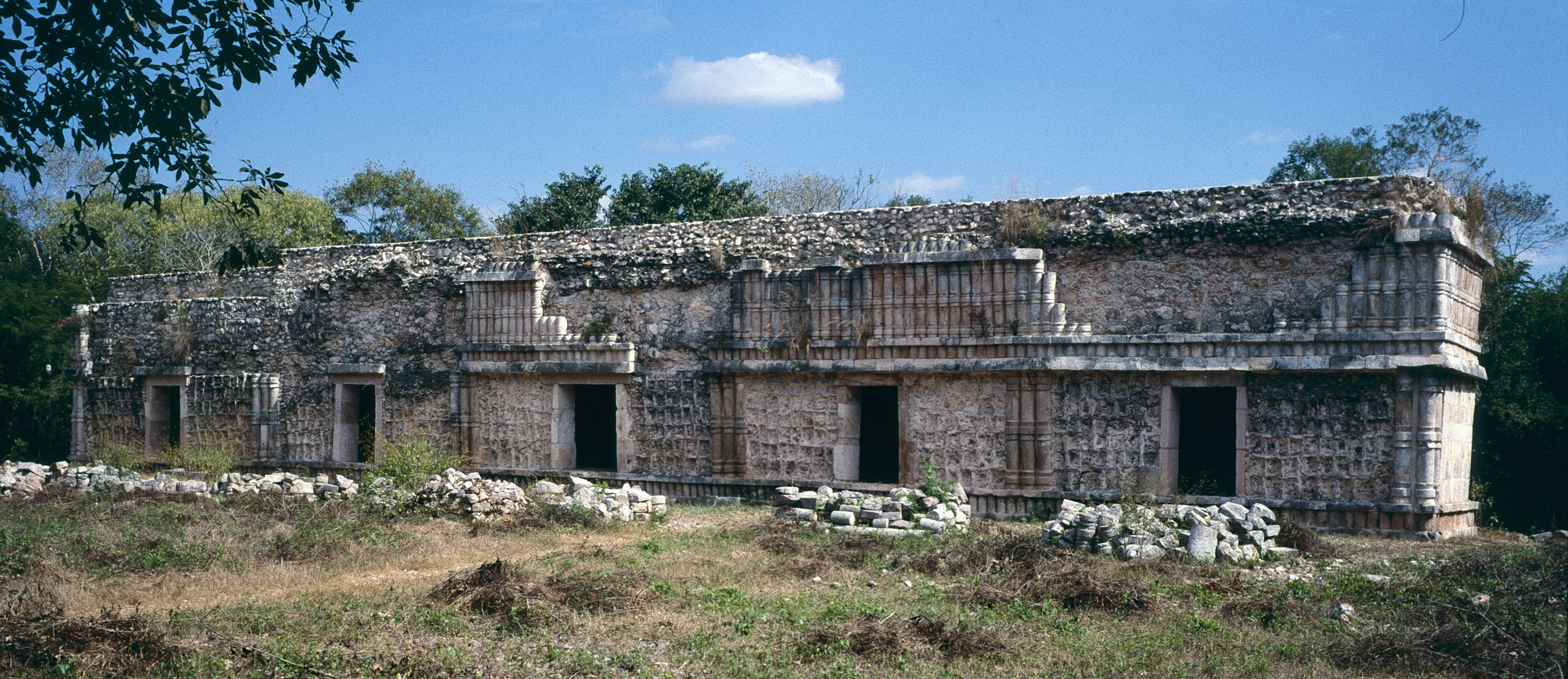
Kabah, building 1C1, West facade. 2010 photo

There are many other groups that exist outside of the central core area. These groups include Structures 1A3-6, Structures 1B2, 1B3, and 1C1-3, and lastly, Structure 3B1.

=== Miscellaneous Sculptures and Monuments ===
The miscellaneous sculptures include M1 through M7 which are various pieces of what were once statues that seem to depict people, possibly deities or rulers. M1 is perhaps the most noteworthy, being the sculpture often referenced by the archaeologists who named the site as it appears to be a clenched hand which led to the name “Kabah”. The site also has a number of altars, low stone buildings, and step pyramid temples. While most of the architecture and sculptures are in the Puuc Maya style, some show Chenes elements. The site had a number of sculpted panels, lintels, and doorjambs, most of which have been removed to museums elsewhere. Kabah boasts more large monumental structures than any other site in the Puuc region.

=== Gallery ===
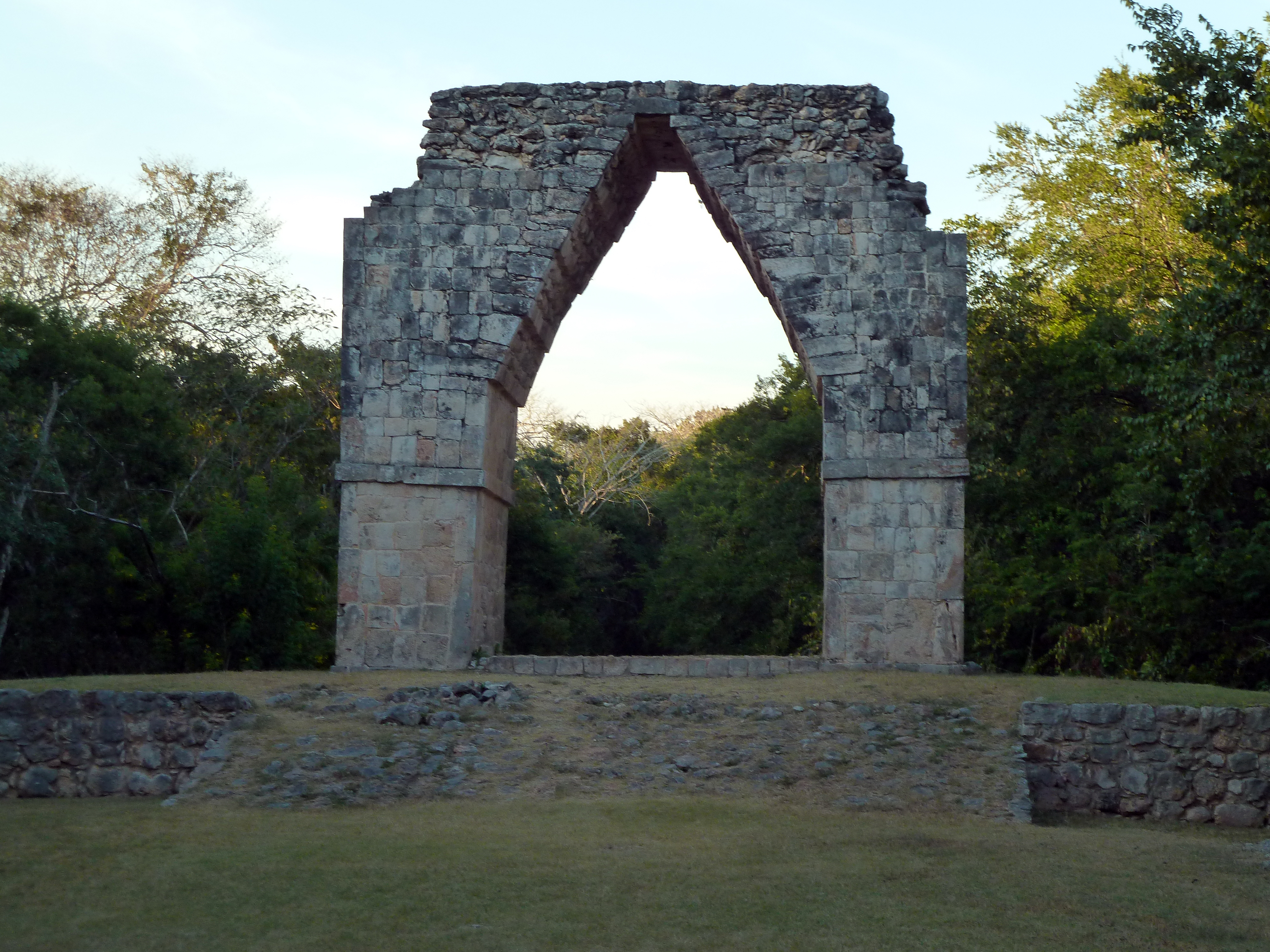
The Arch of Kabah

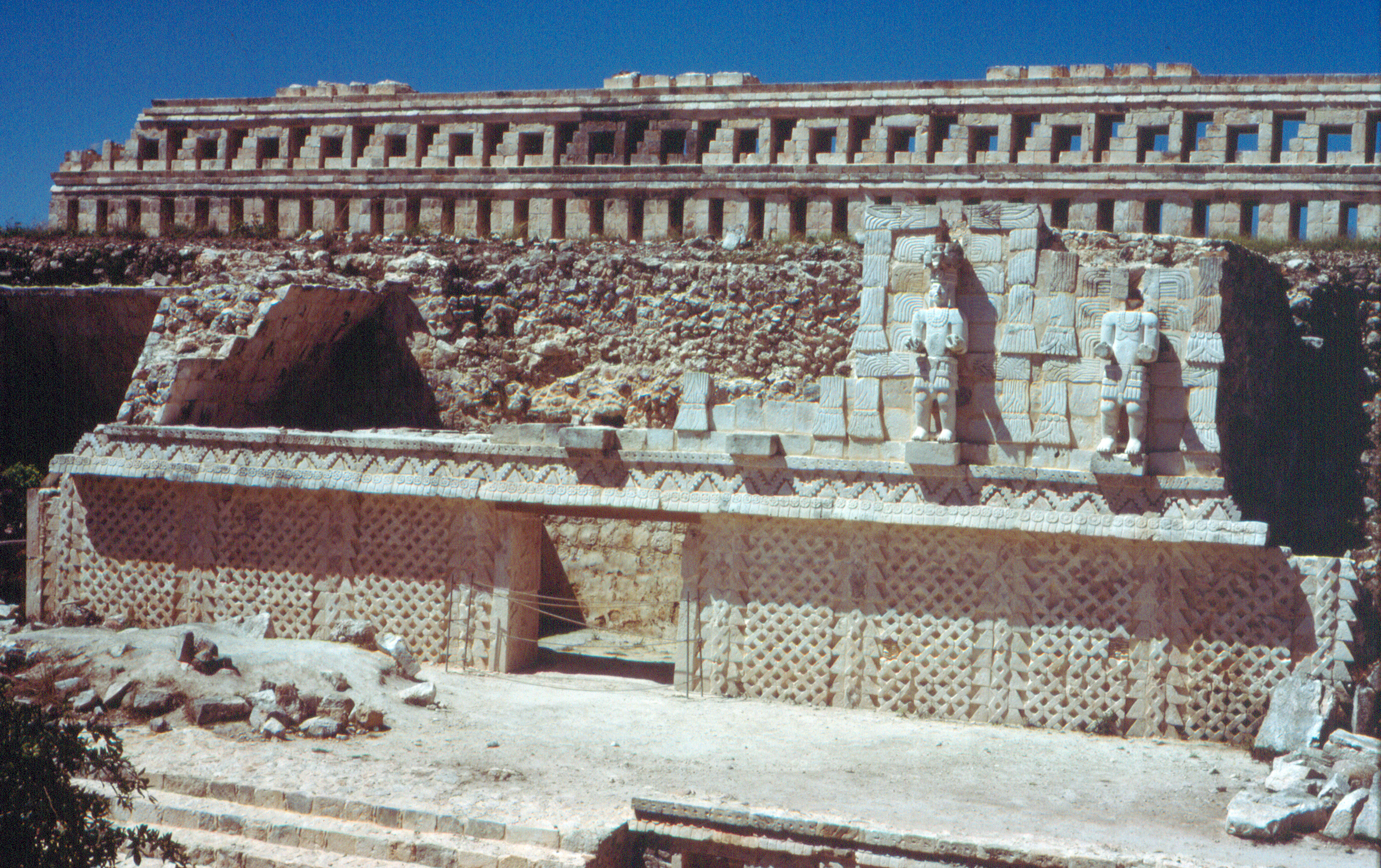
Codz Pop Palace, royal sculptures and east side façade

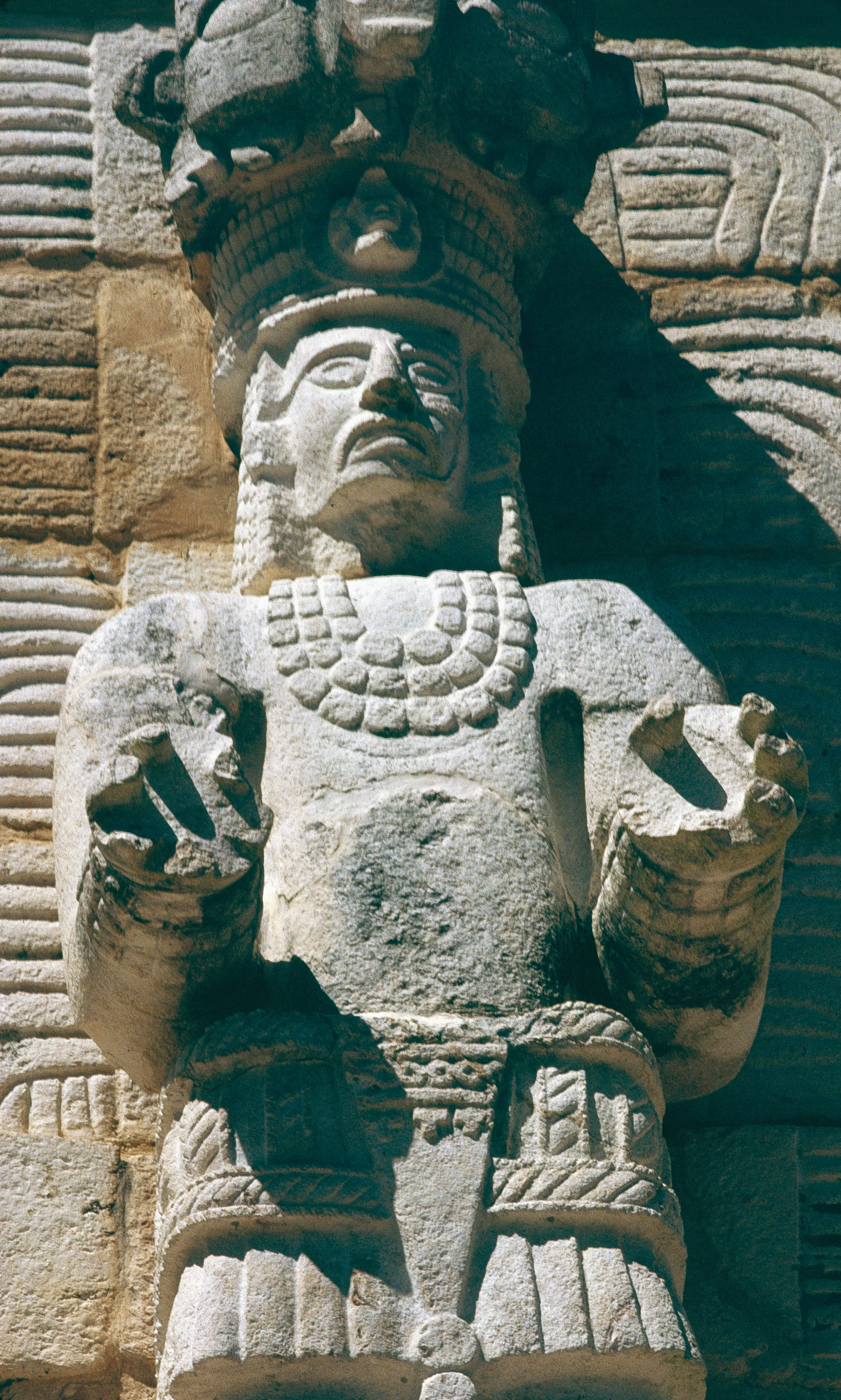
Detail of Mayan figure on Codz Pop

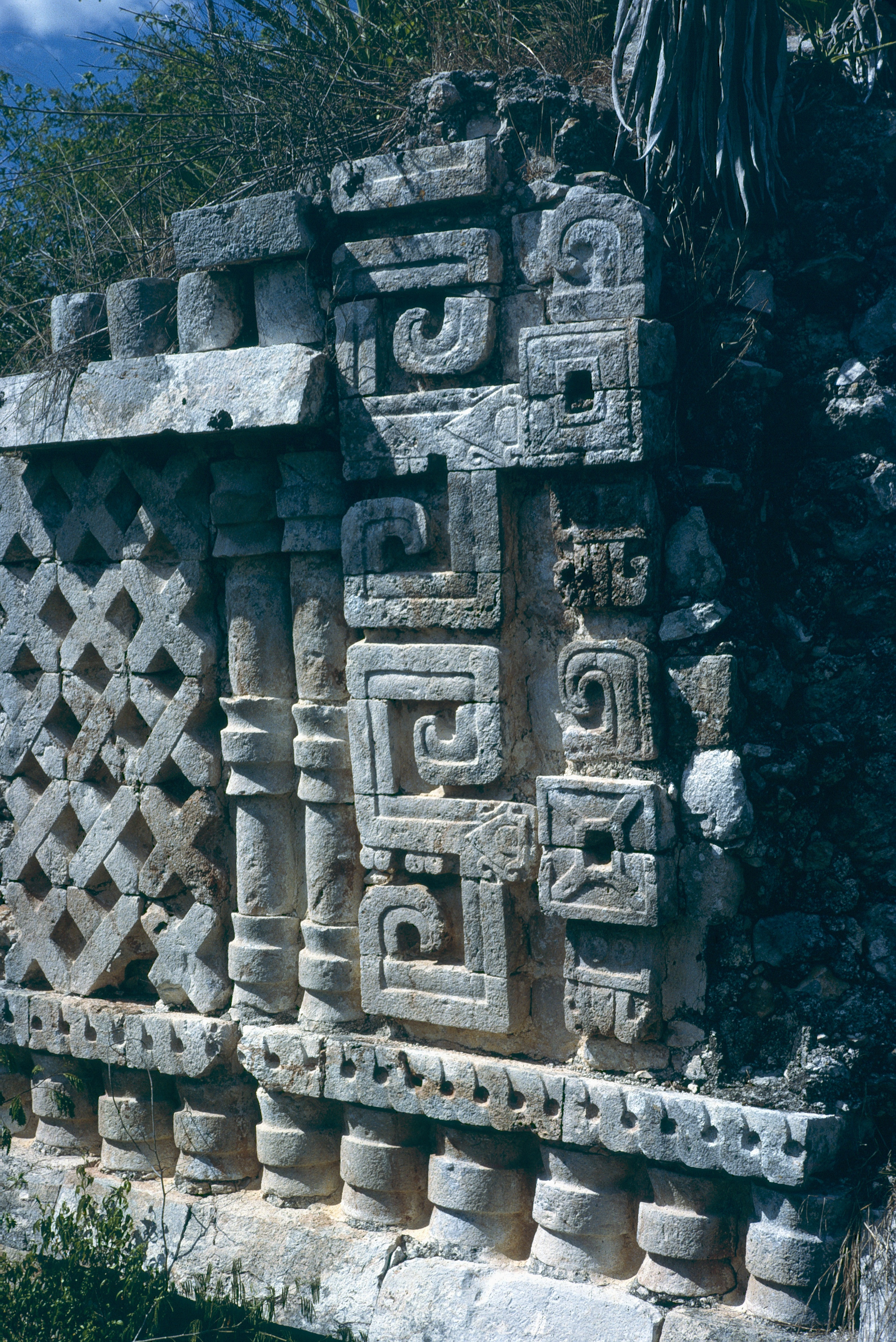
Detail of stonework, building 2A1

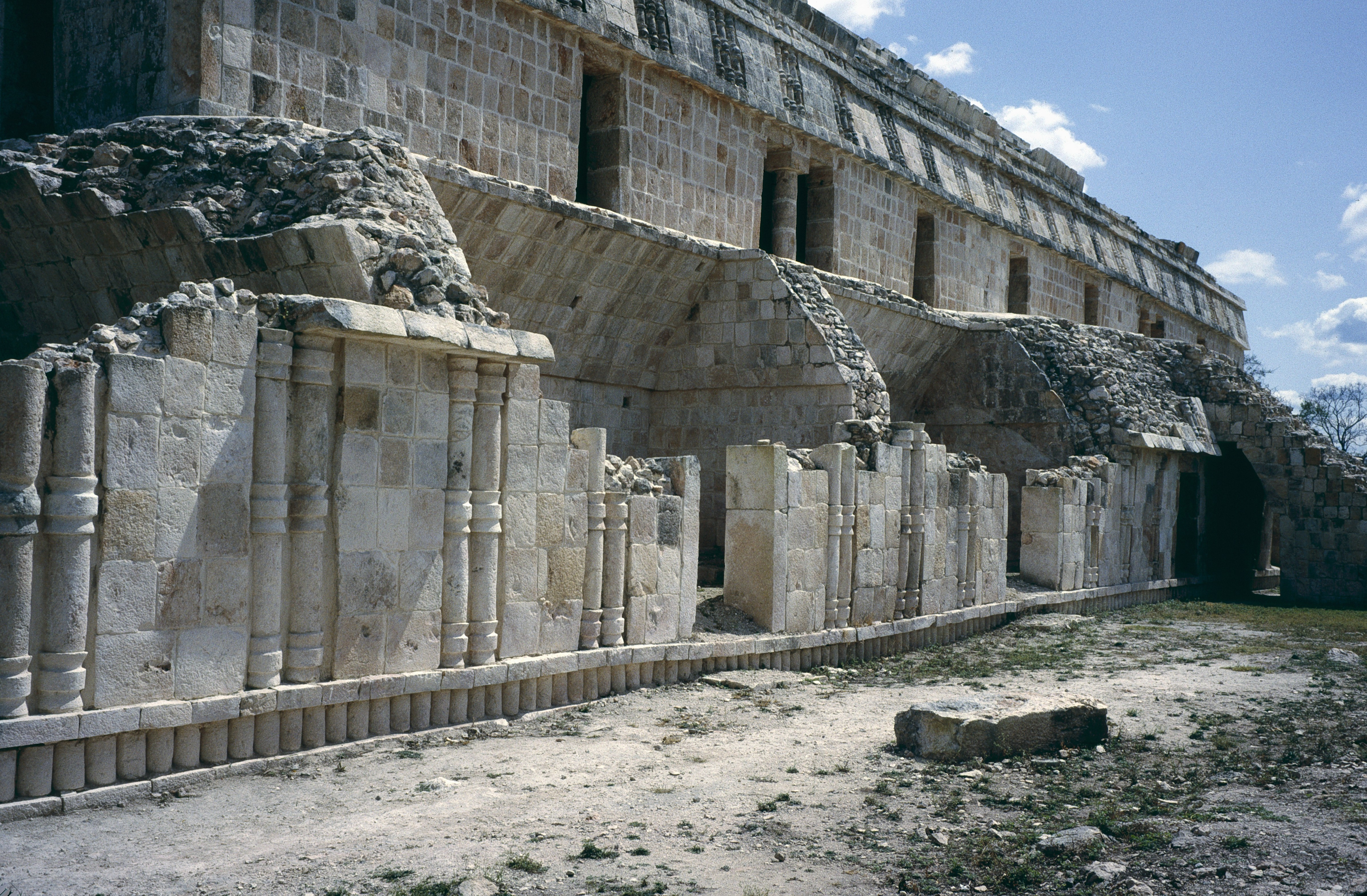
West façade of 2C2

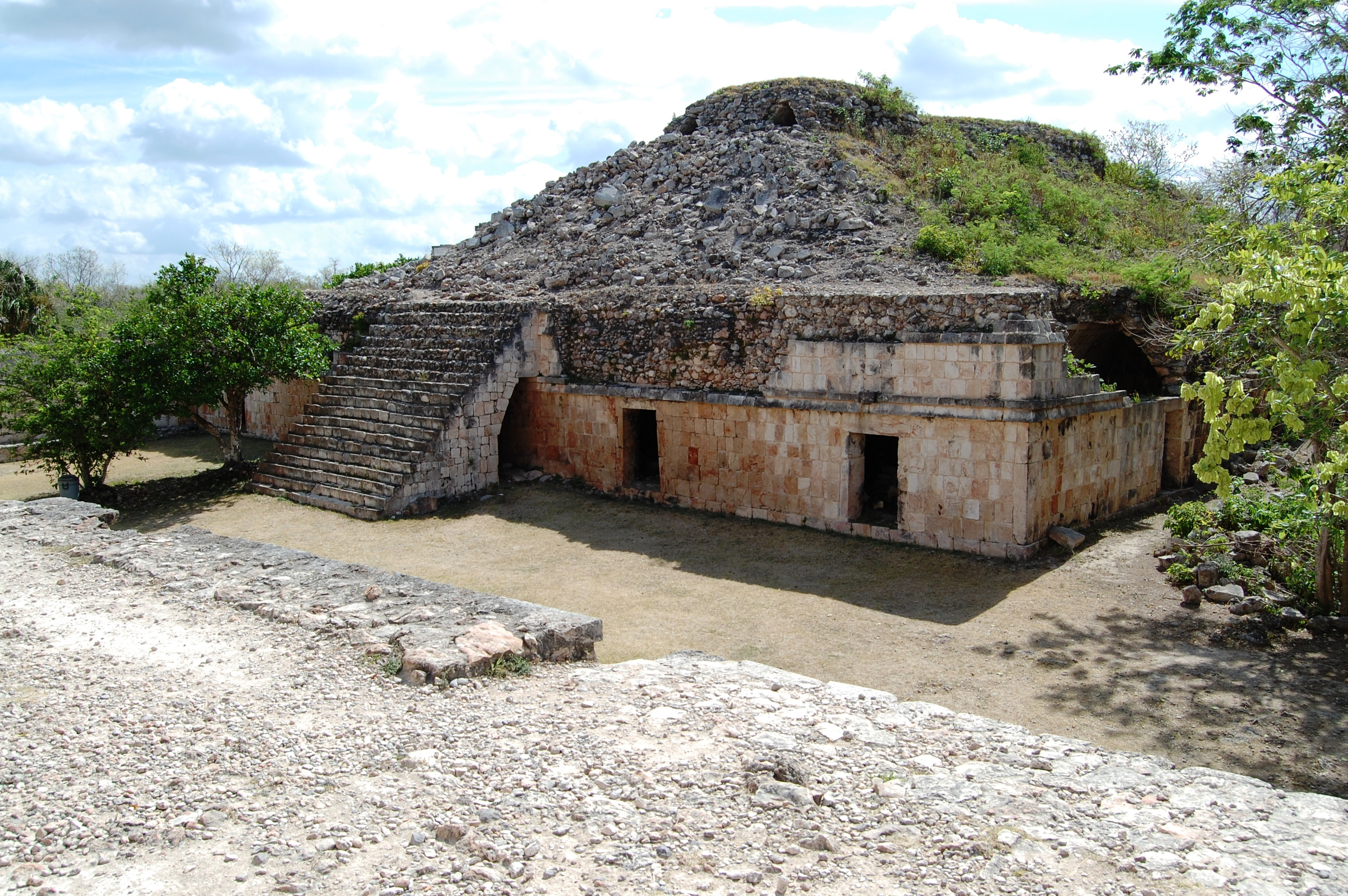
Building 2C3

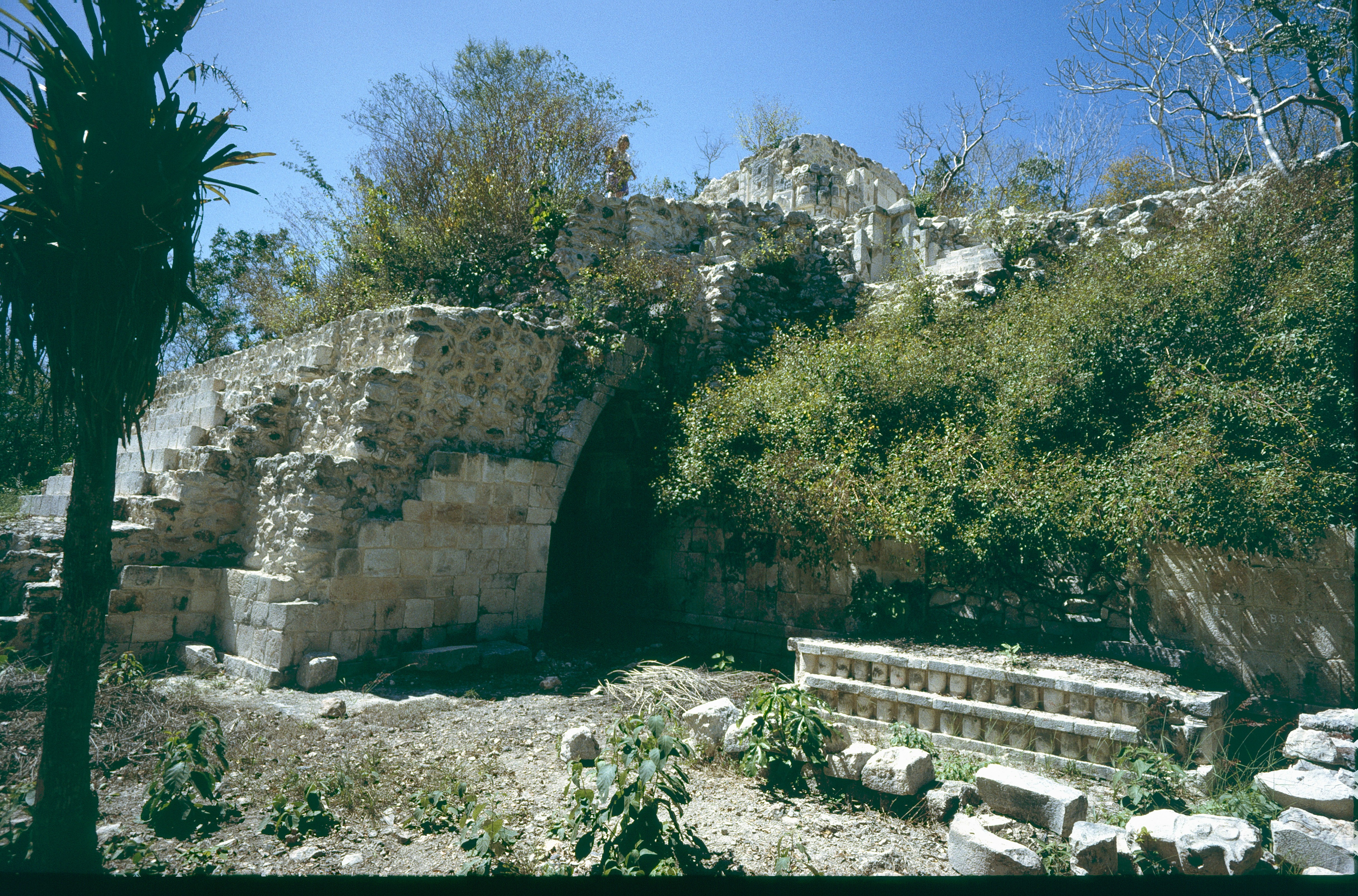
Manos Rojas flying stairs

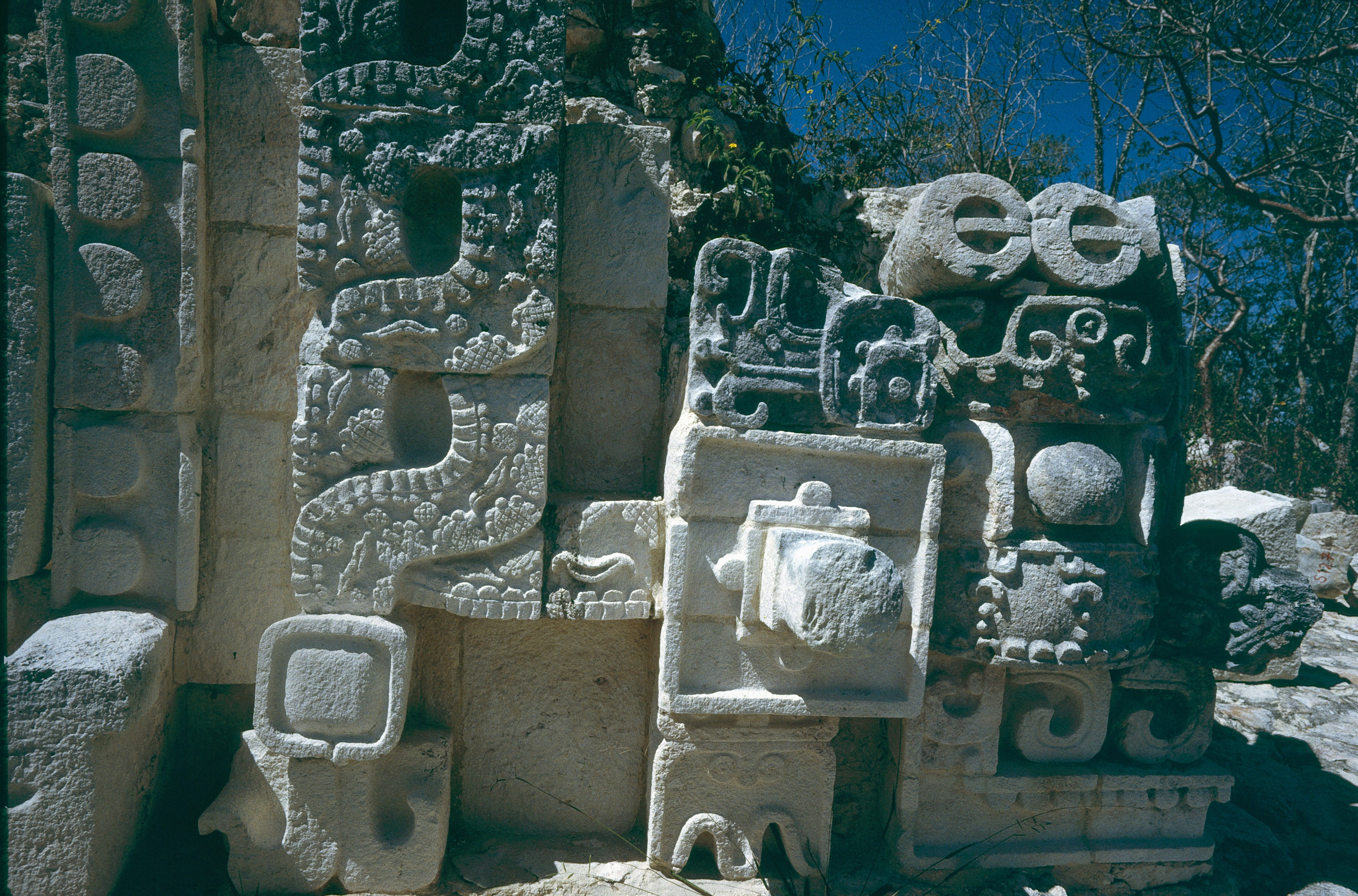
Detail on Manos Rojas

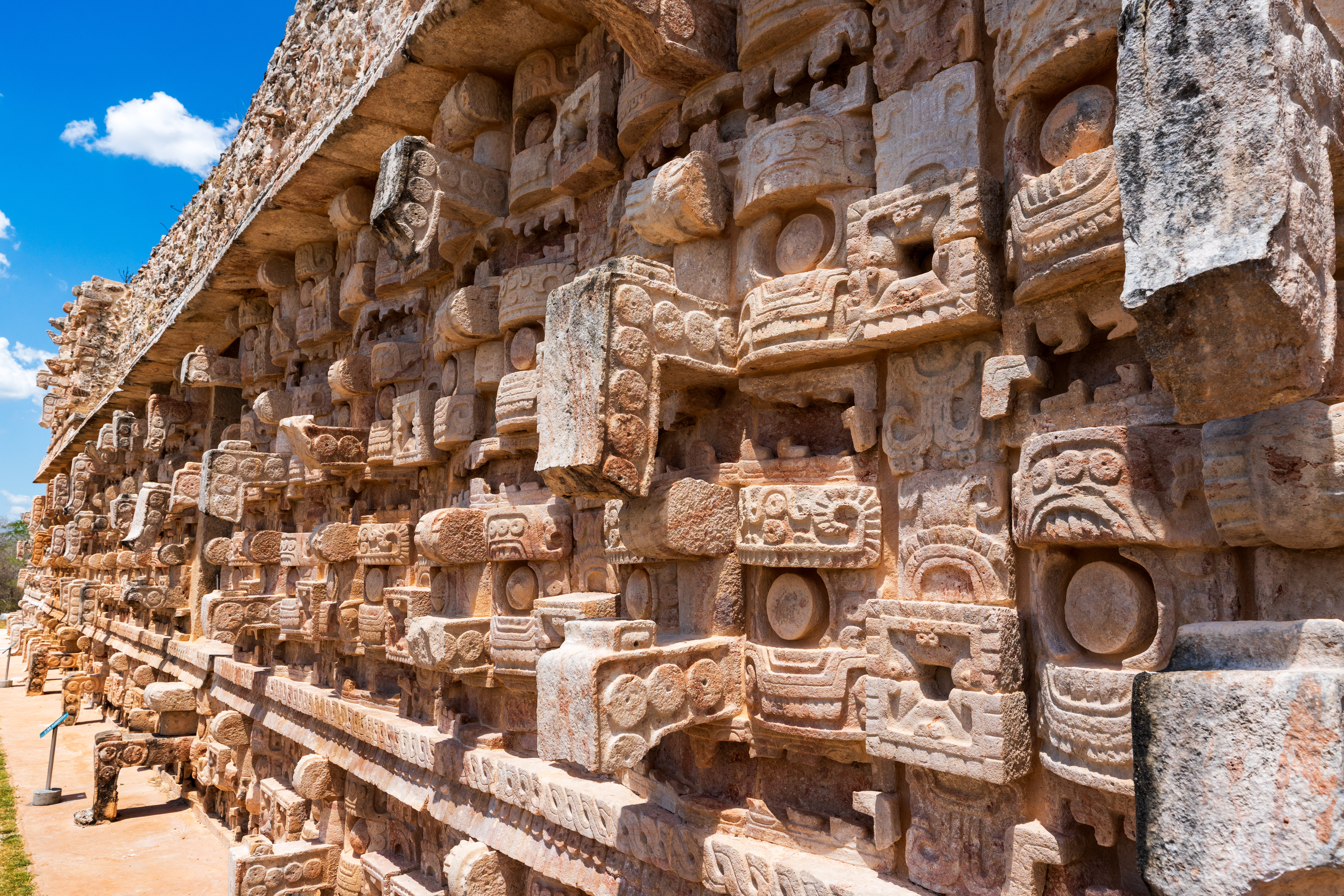
Palace of the Masks, sideview

== Museum ==
In July 2026, the Archeological Museum of the Puuc (Spanish: Museo Arqueológico del Puuc) was inaugurated. It has more than 250 mayan pieces on display. The construction had a cost of 220 million Mexican pesos (about $10 million US dollars). It will be managed by the Instituto Nacional de Antropología e Historia.

== Research ==
In 1955, Karl Ruppert and A. Ledyard Smith lead a research expedition of sites within a 20-km radius of the ruins of Mayapan in order to compare the house types of those sites with those of Mayapan and to find the extent of the Mayapan type. Kabah was one of a few other sites surveyed in order to obtain data on their house types. All structures investigated in Kabah were either of the single-room type, with a doorway in one wall, or were a series of adjoining single rooms each with its separate doorway. Many well-cut reused stones were seen in the walls, which now stand about 40 cm (16 in) high. Some houses were situated on terraces supporting a ceremonial group; others were apart from ceremonial buildings. They occurred in groups of two, three, and four, as well as singly, sometimes on raised areas. Two architectural groups were located close to chultuns.

Microbial biofilms have been found degrading stone buildings at Uxmal and Kabah. Phototrophs such as Xenococcus are found more often on interior walls. However stone degrading Gloeocapsa and Synechocystis were also present in large numbers.
