= Puuc =

Region and Maya architectural style of Yucatán, Mexico

Coordinates: 20°8′33.82″N 89°24′31.92″W

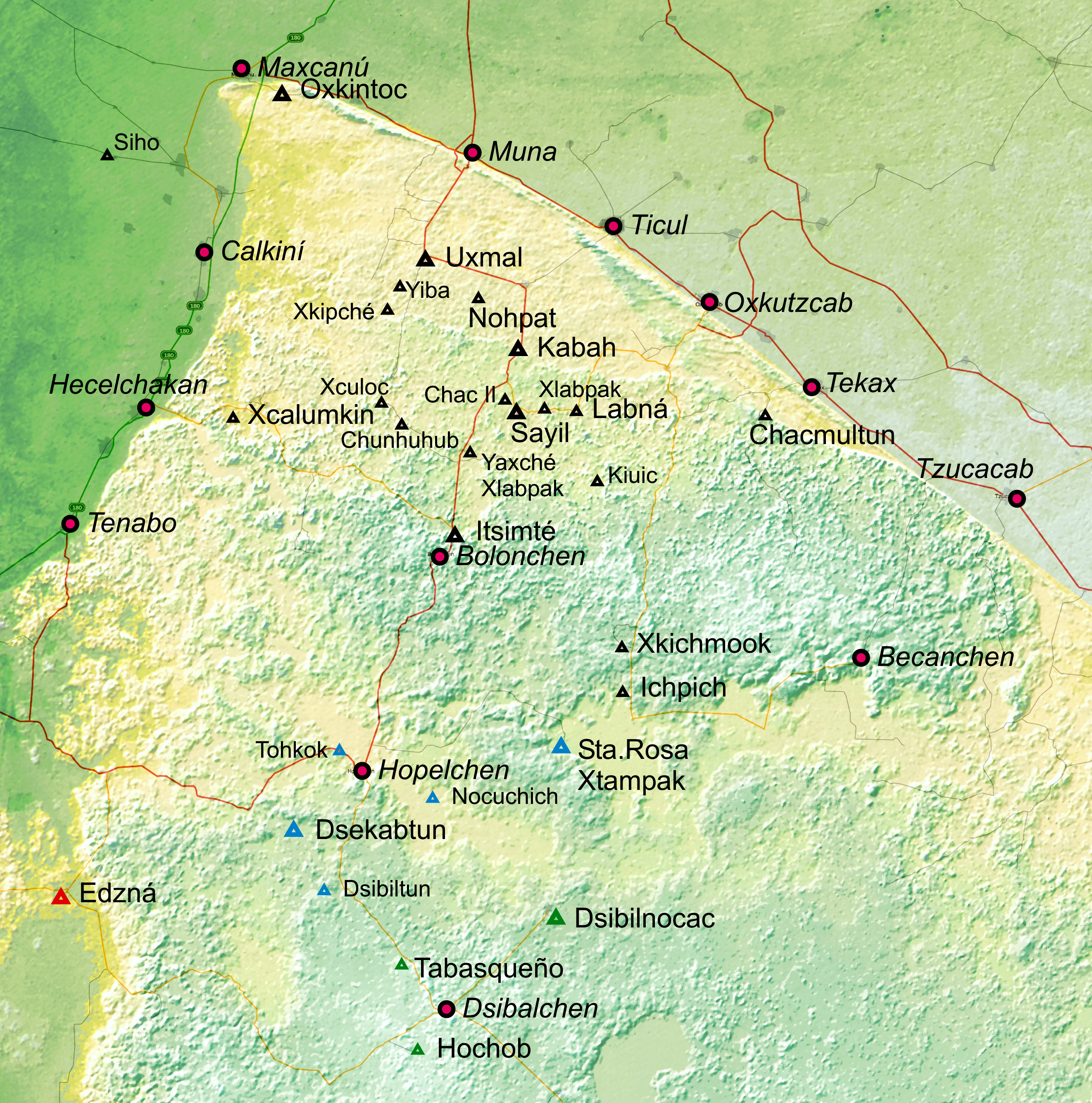
Major sites of the Puuc style (black), Chenes style (green) and transitional styles (blue)

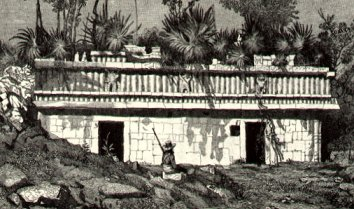
Puuc building at Xculoc, Campeche, as drawn by Frederick Catherwood, 1841

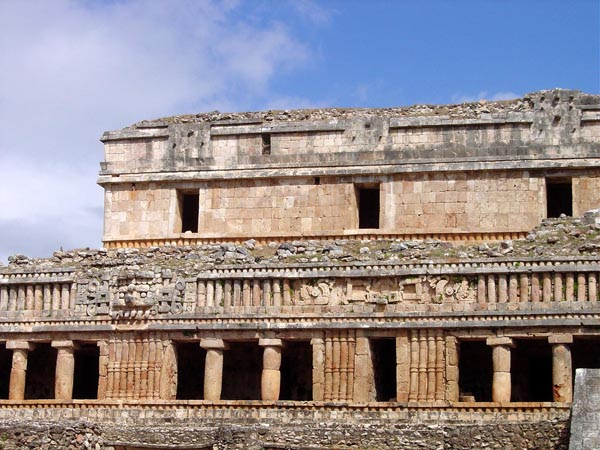
Ruins of the Palace of Sayil.

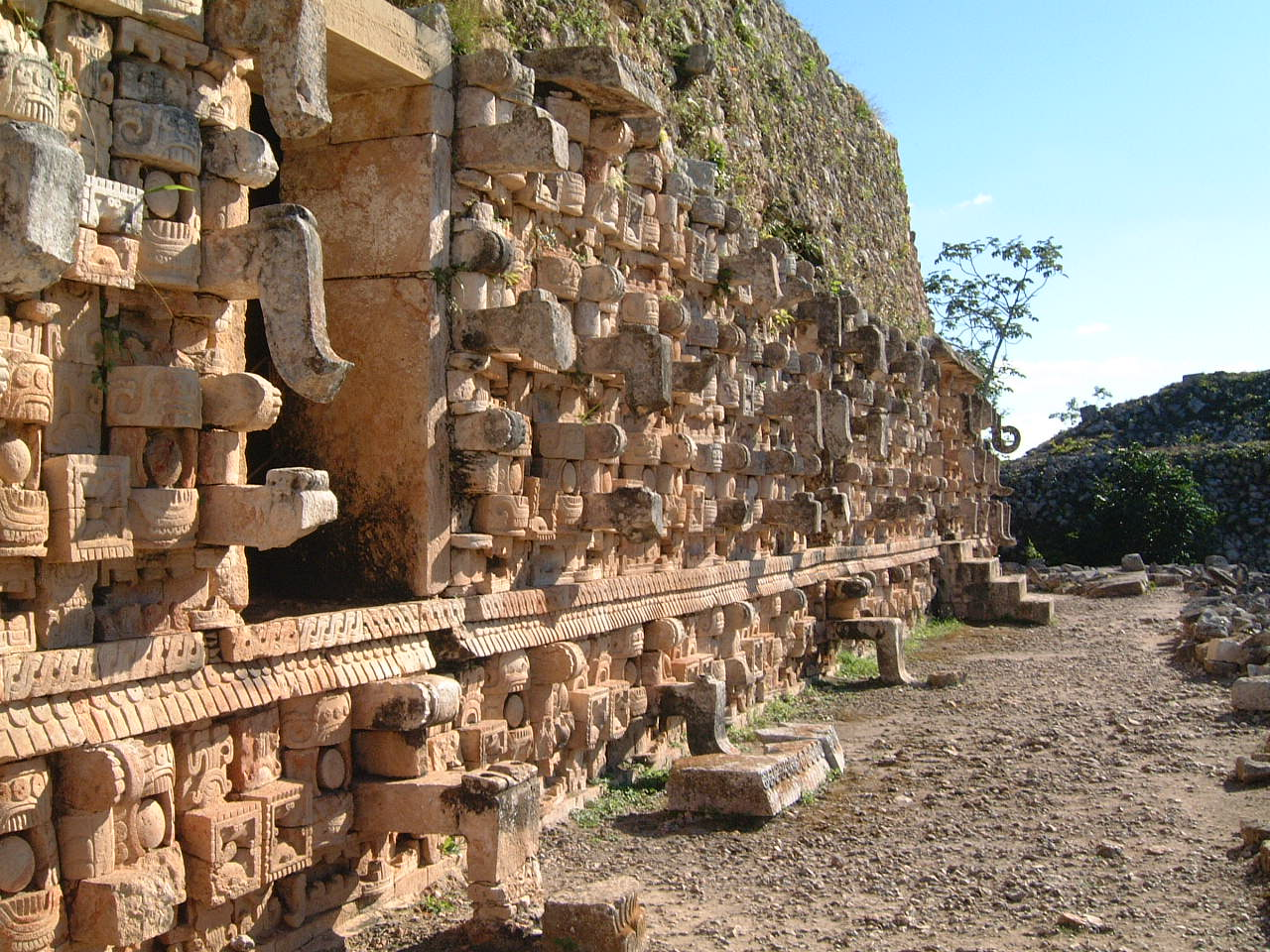
Decoration of Codz Poop at Kabáh.

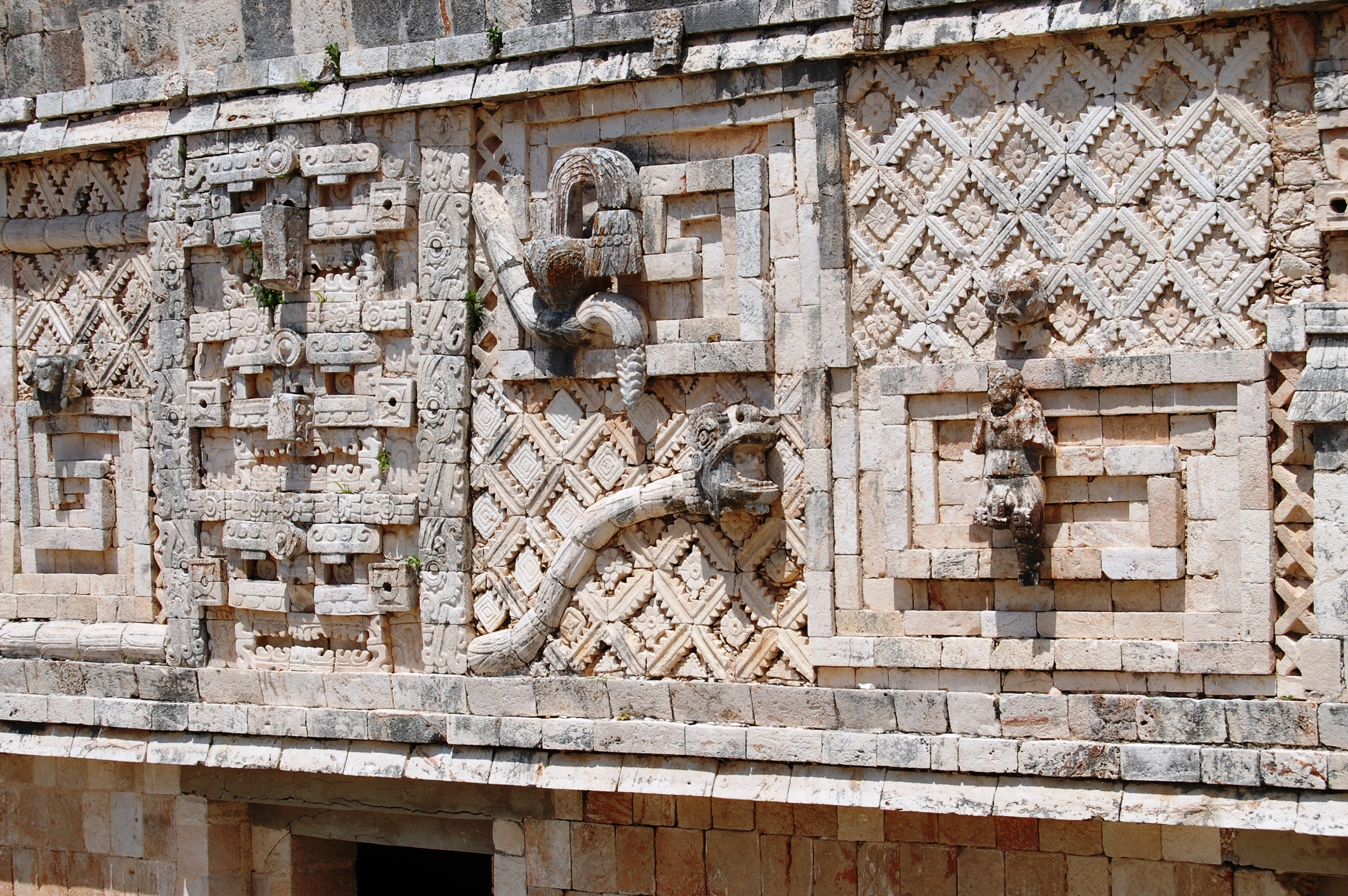
Detail of building in the Nunnery Quadrangle in Uxmal.

Puuc is the name of a region in the Mexican state of Yucatán and a Maya architectural style prevalent in that region. The word puuc is derived from the Maya term for "hill". Since the Yucatán is relatively flat, this term was extended to encompass the large karstic range of hills in the southern portion of the state, hence the terms Puuc region or Puuc hills. The Puuc hills extend into northern Campeche and western Quintana Roo.

The term Puuc is also used to designate the architectural style of ancient Maya sites located within the Puuc hills, hence the term Puuc architecture. This architectural style began at the end of the Late Classic period but experienced its greatest extent during the Terminal Classic period.

== Puuc architecture ==
In the florescence of Puuc architecture (such as at the ancient Maya site of Uxmal) buildings were decorated with carefully cut veneer stones set into a concrete core. The lower portion of the façades are blank with a flat surface of rectangular blocks punctuated by doorways, while the upper façade is richly decorated with intricate stone mosaics, often alternating repeated geometric elements with more elaborate figurative sculpture. Long-nosed masks (commonly believed to be of the Maya rain god Chaac) are found on many Puuc buildings.

Beyond the impressive decorative elements of Puuc architecture, the use of a concrete core is also considered an architectural advance beyond the earlier Maya technique of using larger stones (set on top of one another in lime and mud mortar) for structural support. The concrete core-veneer masonry allowed for slightly larger and more stable interior rooms. Many corbelled vaults in the Puuc style remain standing, even when most of the veneer stones have fallen away.

The most famous of the Maya sites exhibiting the Puuc architectural style is Uxmal; other major Puuc-style sites in the region include Labna, Kabah, Sayil and Xlapak. The architectural style is also seen at Kiuic, Bolonchen, Chunhuhub, Xculoc, and many smaller ruins. The transition from earlier Classic Period architecture to Puuc style core-veneer masonry is well documented at the site of Oxkintok. To the south, the style can be found in Edzná; and to the east at Chichen Itza (outside of the Puuc Hills region).

As stated by the Maya explorer Teobert Maler, who explored this zone intensively, the area around the site of Dolores is full of ruins. The recently completed Chunhuaymil project compiled data of the remaining Puuc architecture of 19 archaeological sites located in a 100 square kilometers area.

== Puuc Biocultural State Reserve ==
Puuc Biocultural State Reserve, also known as Kaxil Kiuic reserve (Spanish Reserva Estatal Biocultural del Puuc) was designated in 2011. It covers an area of 1358.93 km^{2}. The reserve was created to protect the region's archeological sites as well as its biodiverse flora and fauna. The reserve is home to 247 bird, 63 mammal, 52 reptile, and 14 amphibian species. Five species of large felines, including jaguars, live in the reserve.
