= Labna =

Maya archeological site in the Puuc region, Yucatán

Coordinates: 20°10′21″N 89°34′44.40″W

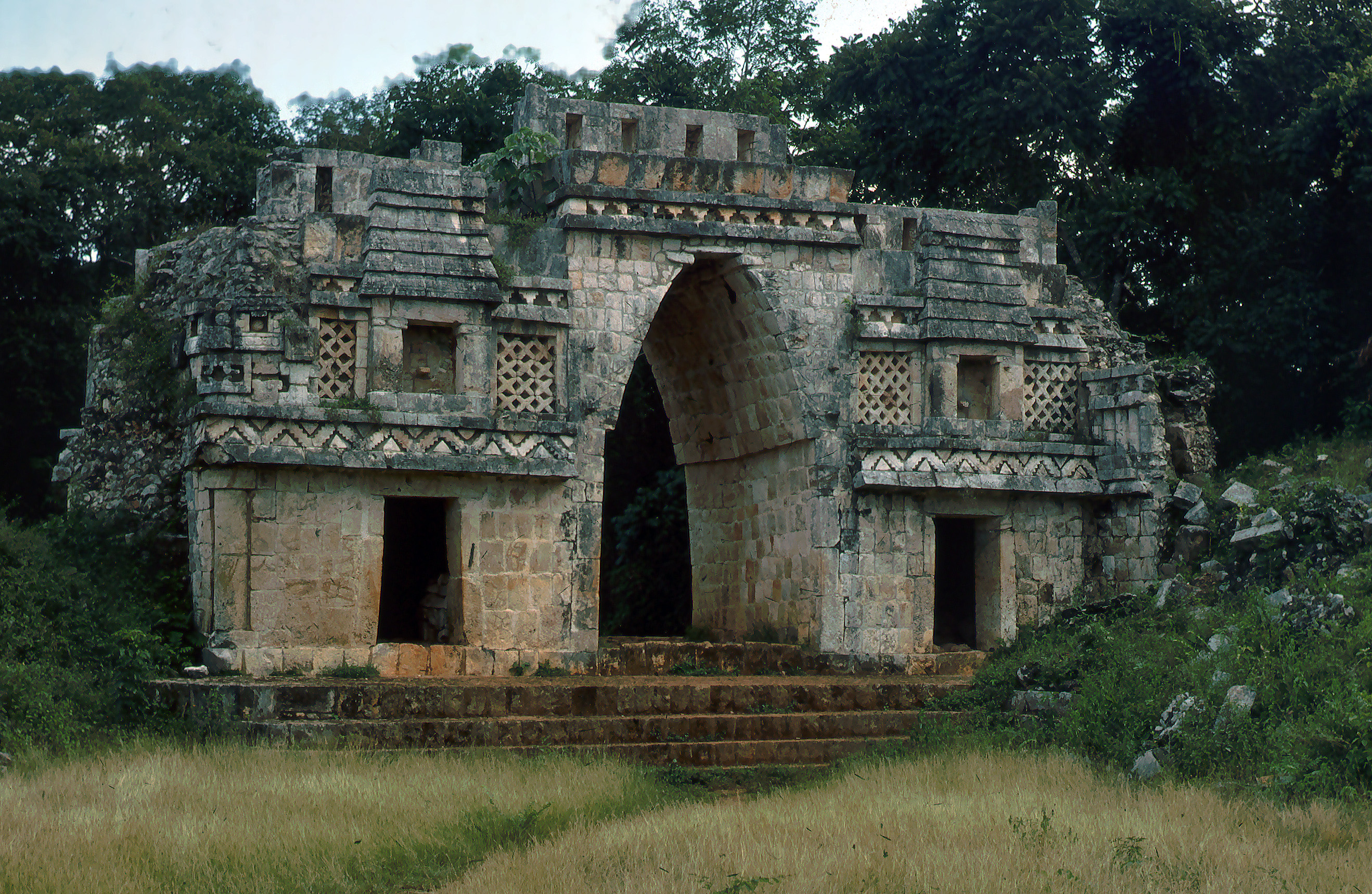
- The Gateway Arch of Labna
- Interactive map of Labna
- Periods: Late Classic to Terminal Classic.
- Cultures: Maya civilization

History
- Built: 862 AD (according to inscriptions)

UNESCO World Heritage Site
- Official name: Pre-Hispanic Town of Uxmal
- Criteria: Cultural: i, ii, iii
- Reference: 791
- Inscription: 1996 (20th Session)

Labna (or Labná in Spanish orthography) is a Mesoamerican archaeological site and ceremonial center of the pre-Columbian Maya civilization, located in the Puuc Hills region of the Yucatán Peninsula. It is situated to the south of the large Maya site of Uxmal, in the southwest of the present-day state of Yucatán, Mexico. Labna, Sayil and Kabah were incorporated with Uxmal as a UNESCO World Heritage Site in 1996.

== History ==
The city existed from 200 to 1000 AD. It reached its peak in the period from 800 to 1000 AD. It undoubtedly had a complex social organization and shares style and decorative elements with other cities in the region (Uxmal, Sayil, Kabah). It is estimated that about 3,000 inhabitants lived in Labna.

The first written report of Labna was by John Lloyd Stephens who visited it with artist Frederick Catherwood in 1842. Thanks to this, drawings illustrating the state of the ruins from that period have also been preserved.

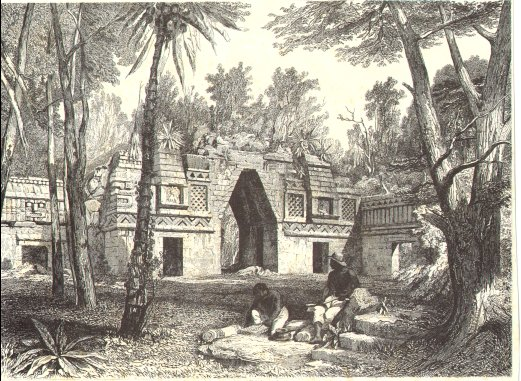
The Labna Arch sketched by Catherwood

== Archeological zone ==
The site is a comparatively small and compact one. Among its notable structures is a large two-storey 'palace' ("El Palacio"), which is one of the longest contiguous structures in the Puuc region at approximately 120 m (393.7 ft) in length. From the palace, a ceremonial road (sacbe) extends to an elaborately decorated gateway arch ("El Arco"). This structure is 3 m (9.8 ft) wide and 6 m high, with well-reserved bas-reliefs. The arch is not an entrance to the city, but rather is a passageway between public areas. Next to this gateway stands "El Mirador", a pyramid-like structure surmounted by a temple. A part of the same site is the Temple of the Columns.

The structural design and motifs of the site's buildings are in the Maya architecture regional style known as Puuc. This makes extensive use of well-cut stone forming patterns and depictions, including masks of the long-nosed rain-god Chaac.

The site was built in the Late and Terminal Classic era. A date corresponding to AD 862 is inscribed in the palace.

The site is open to visitors.

== Gallery ==
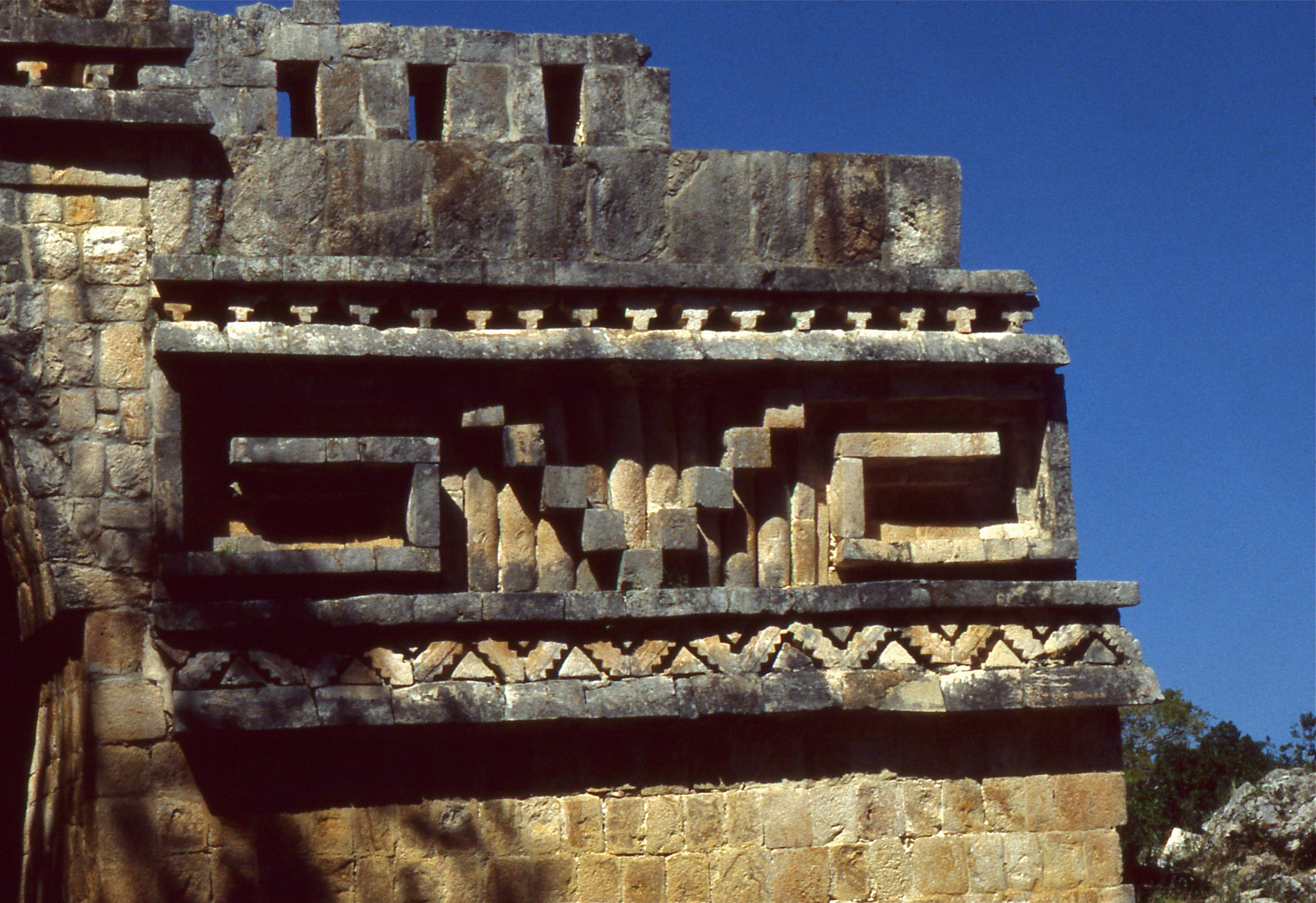
Detail on the Arch of Labna

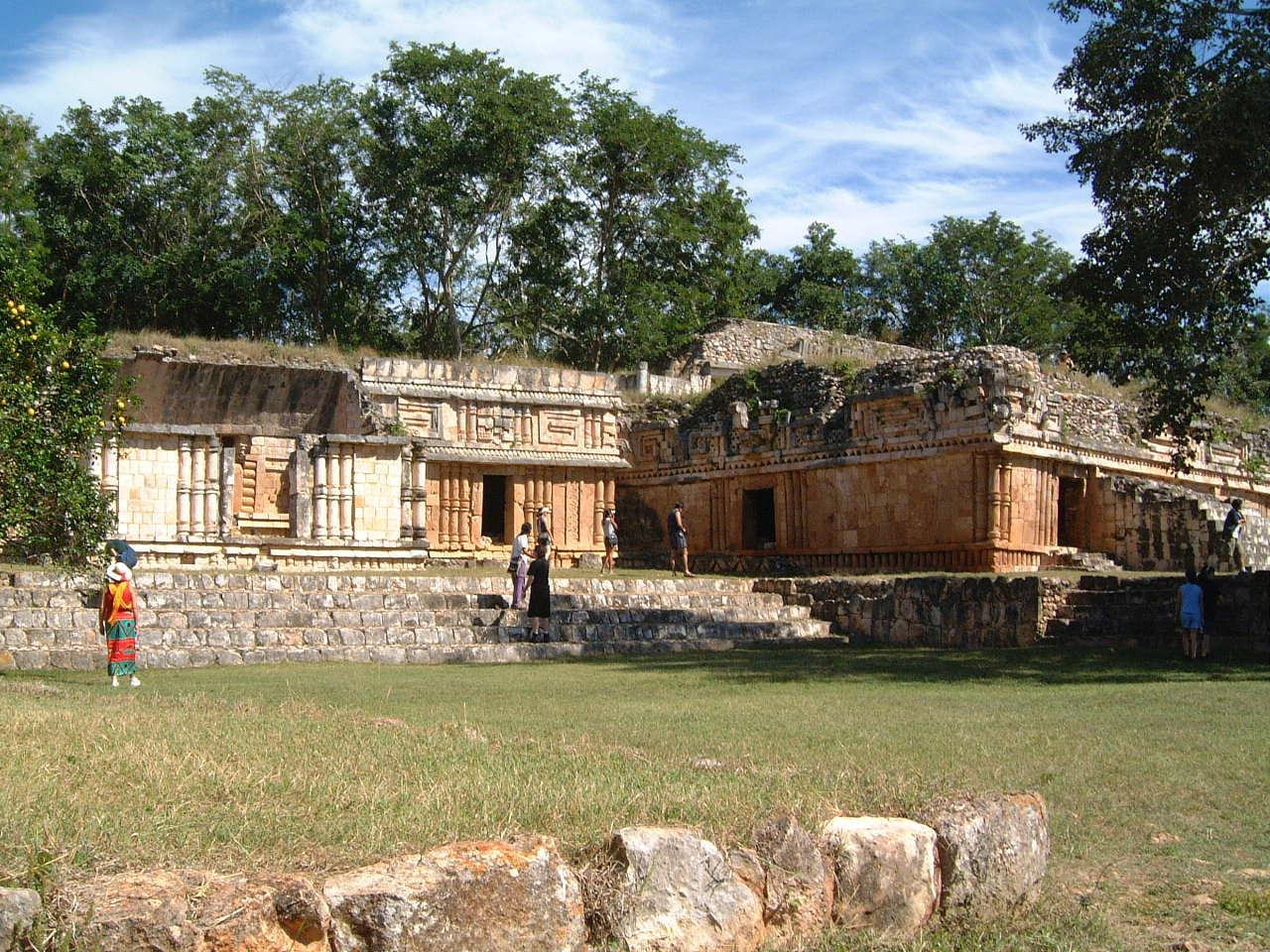
The Palace of Labna

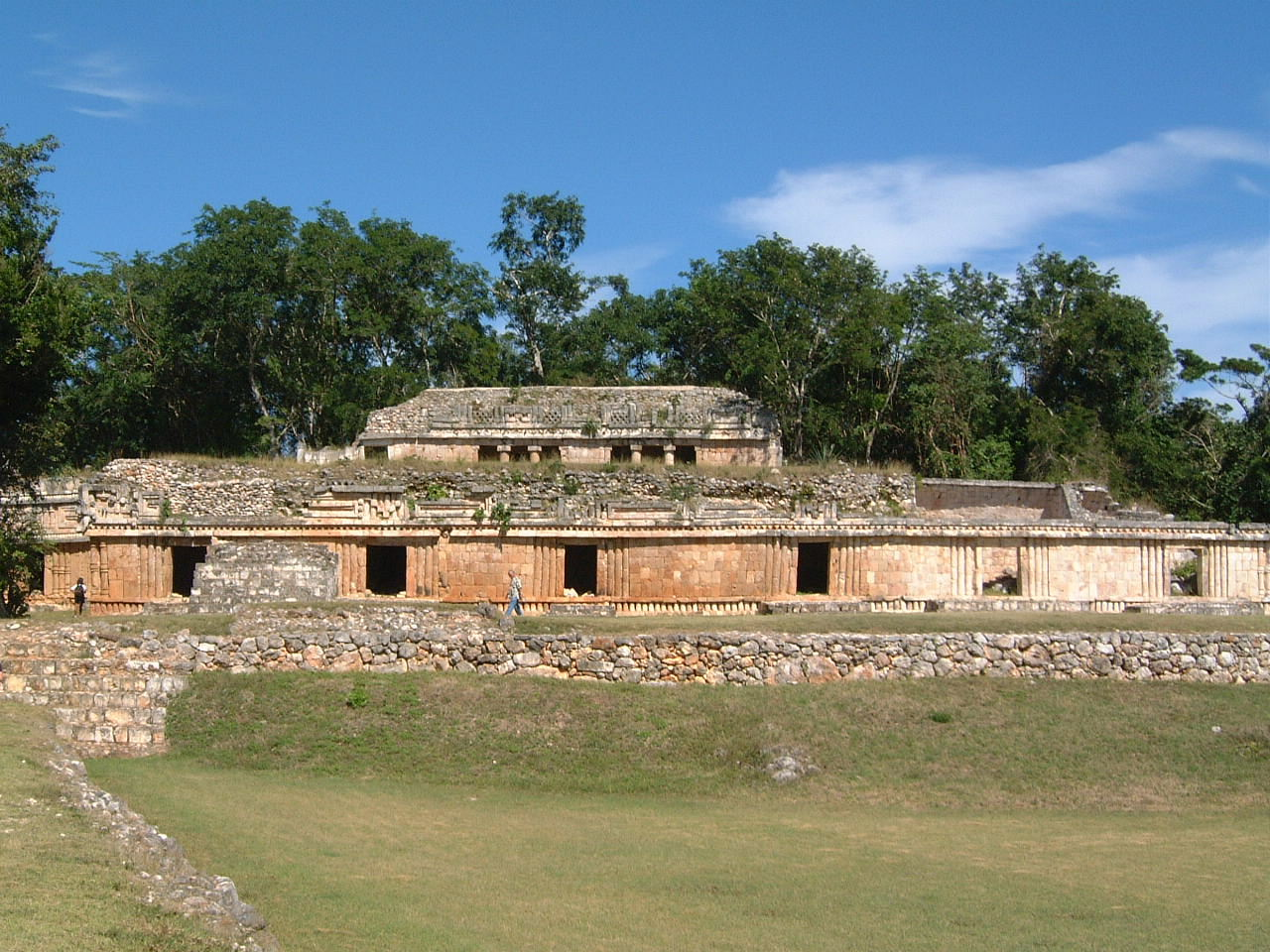

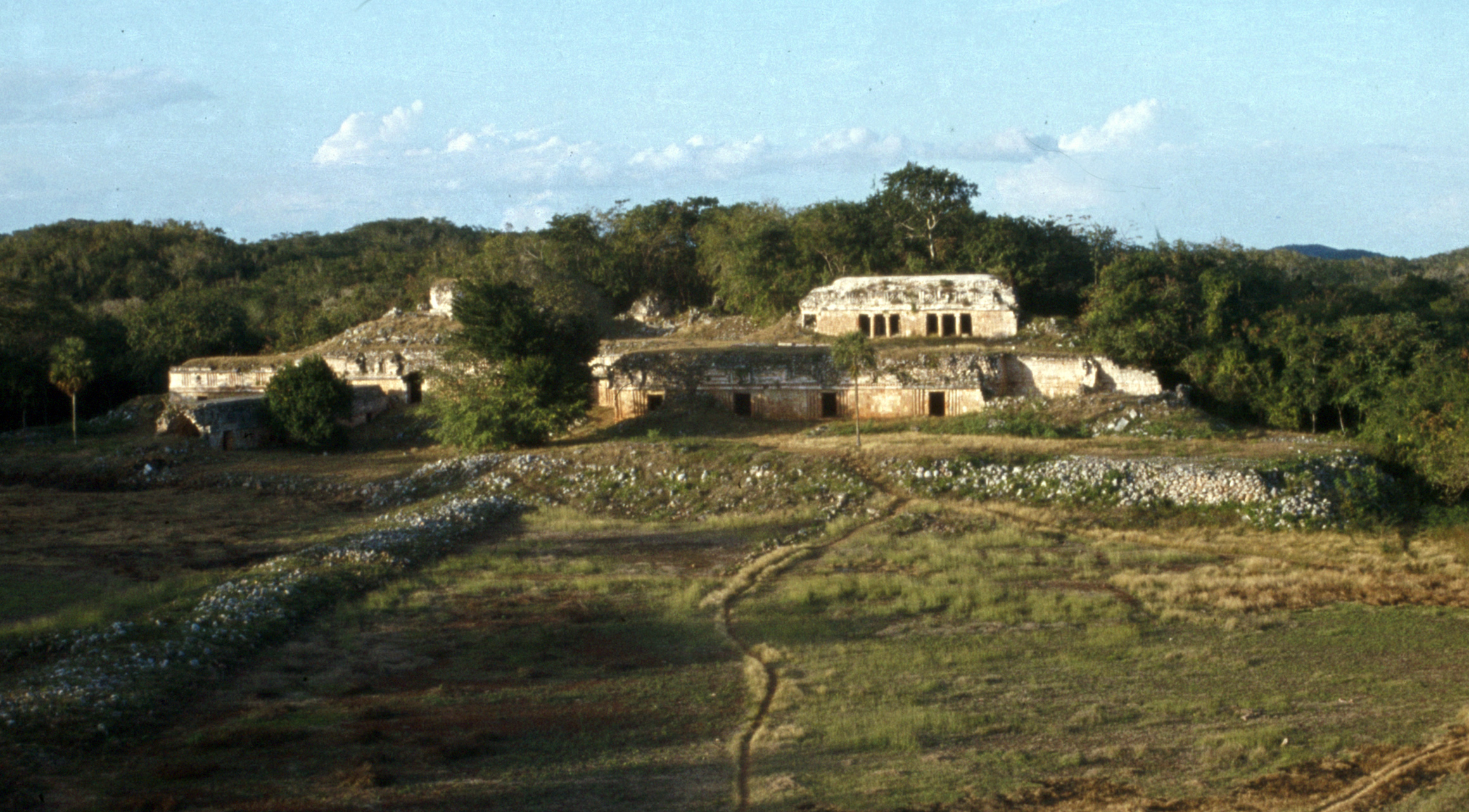

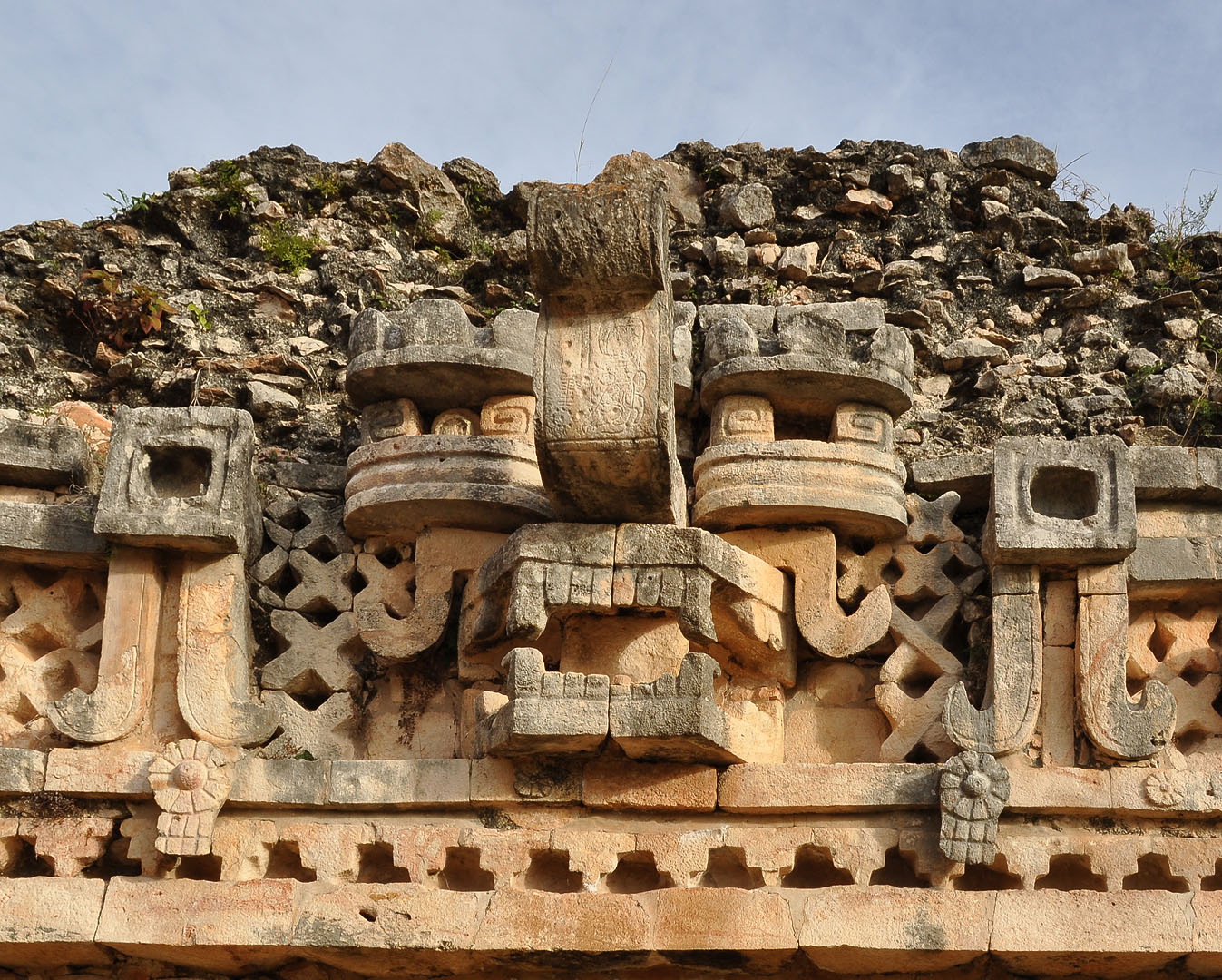
Detail on the Palace of Labna – Chaac mask

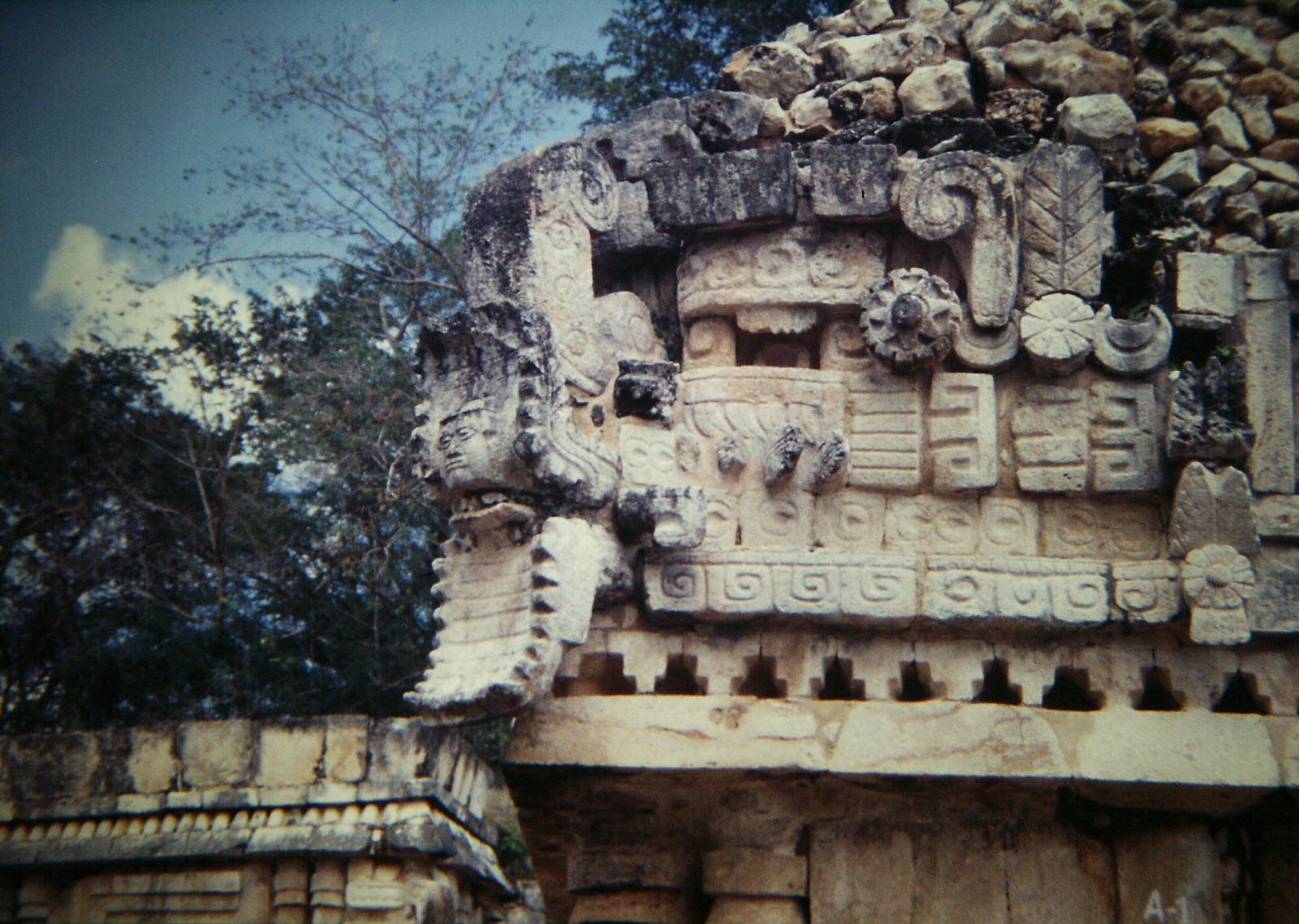
Detail on the Palace of Labna – Vision Serpent

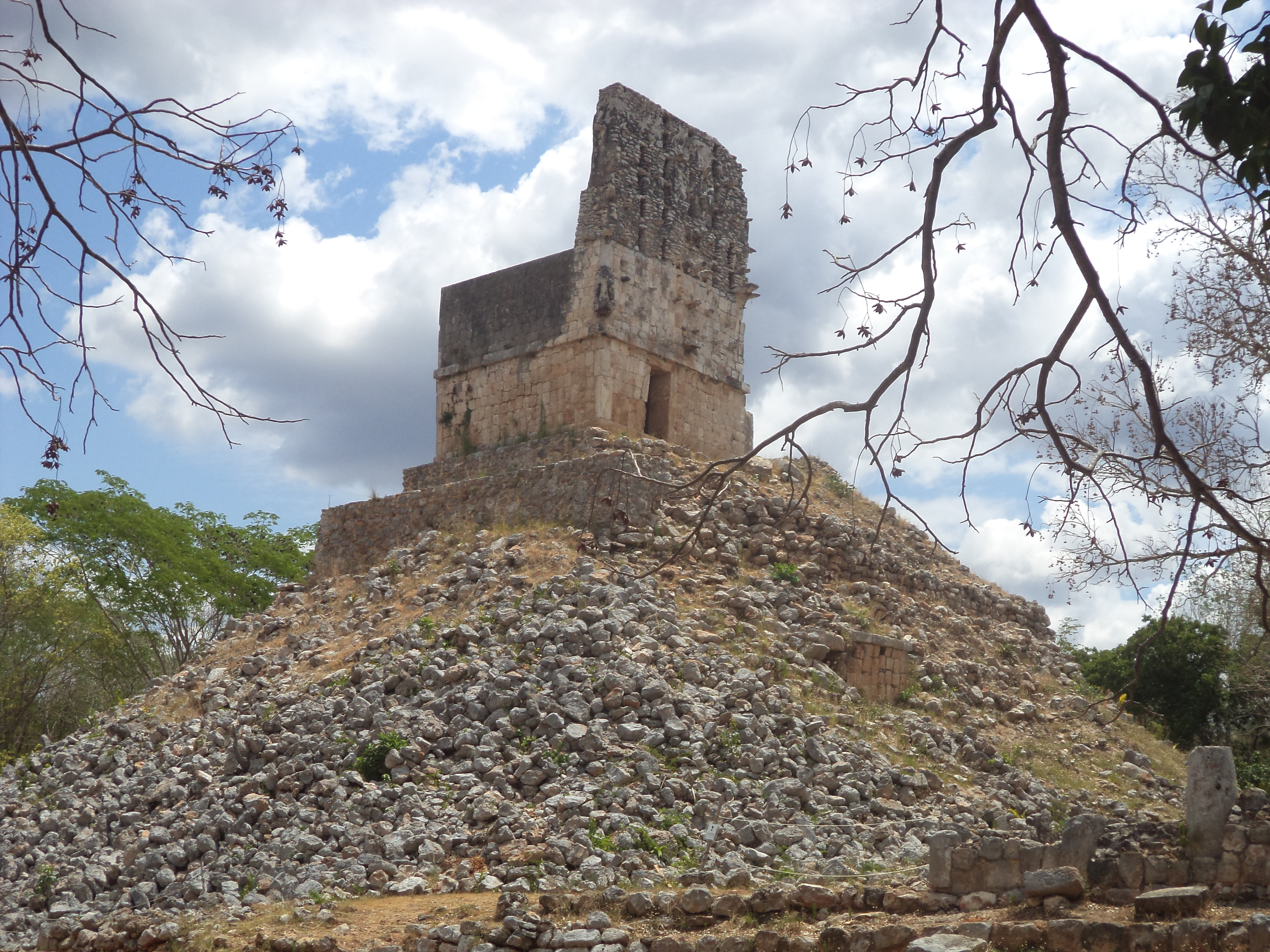
El Mirador temple

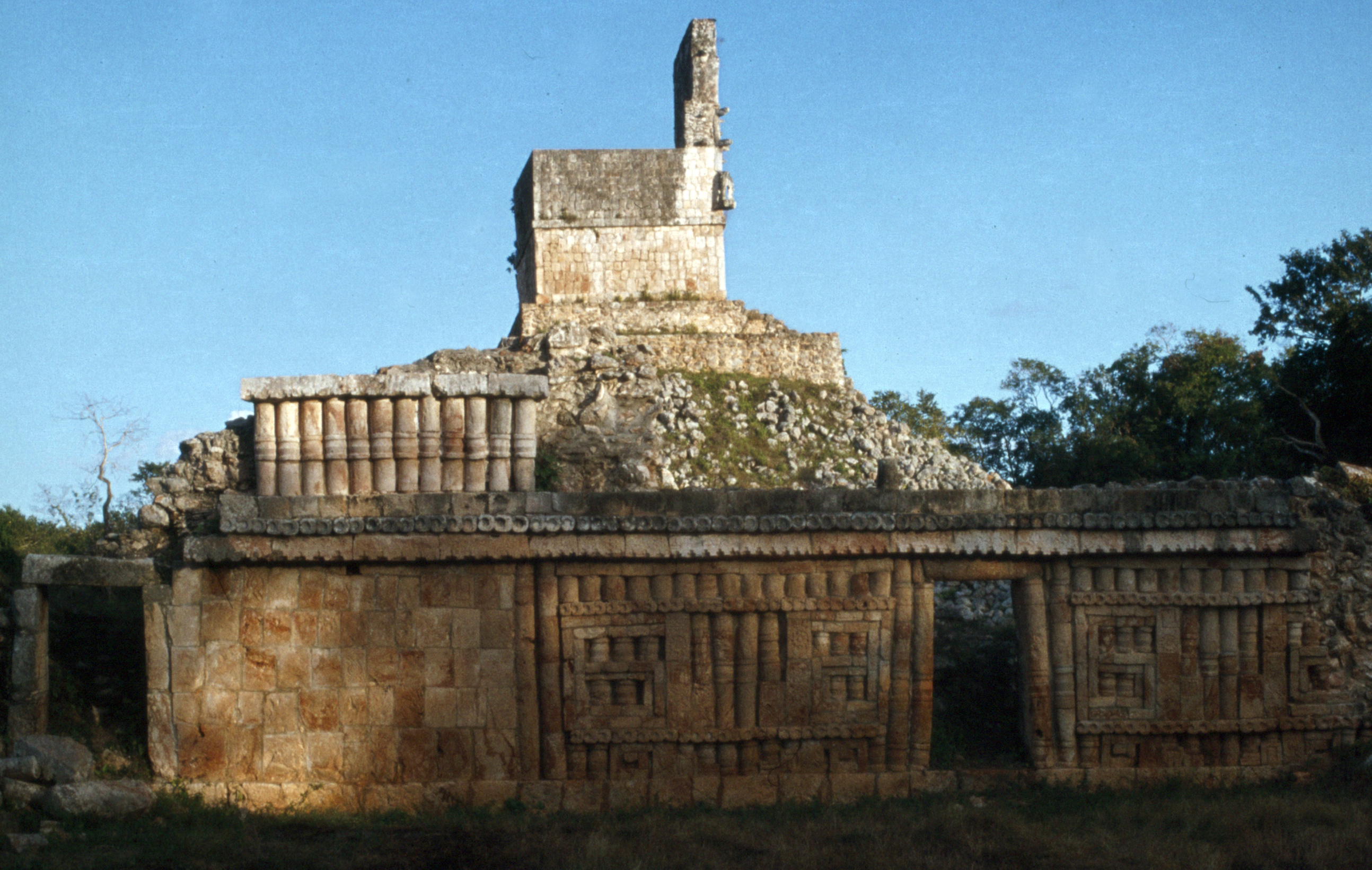
