= Tom Felton =

English actor (born 1987)

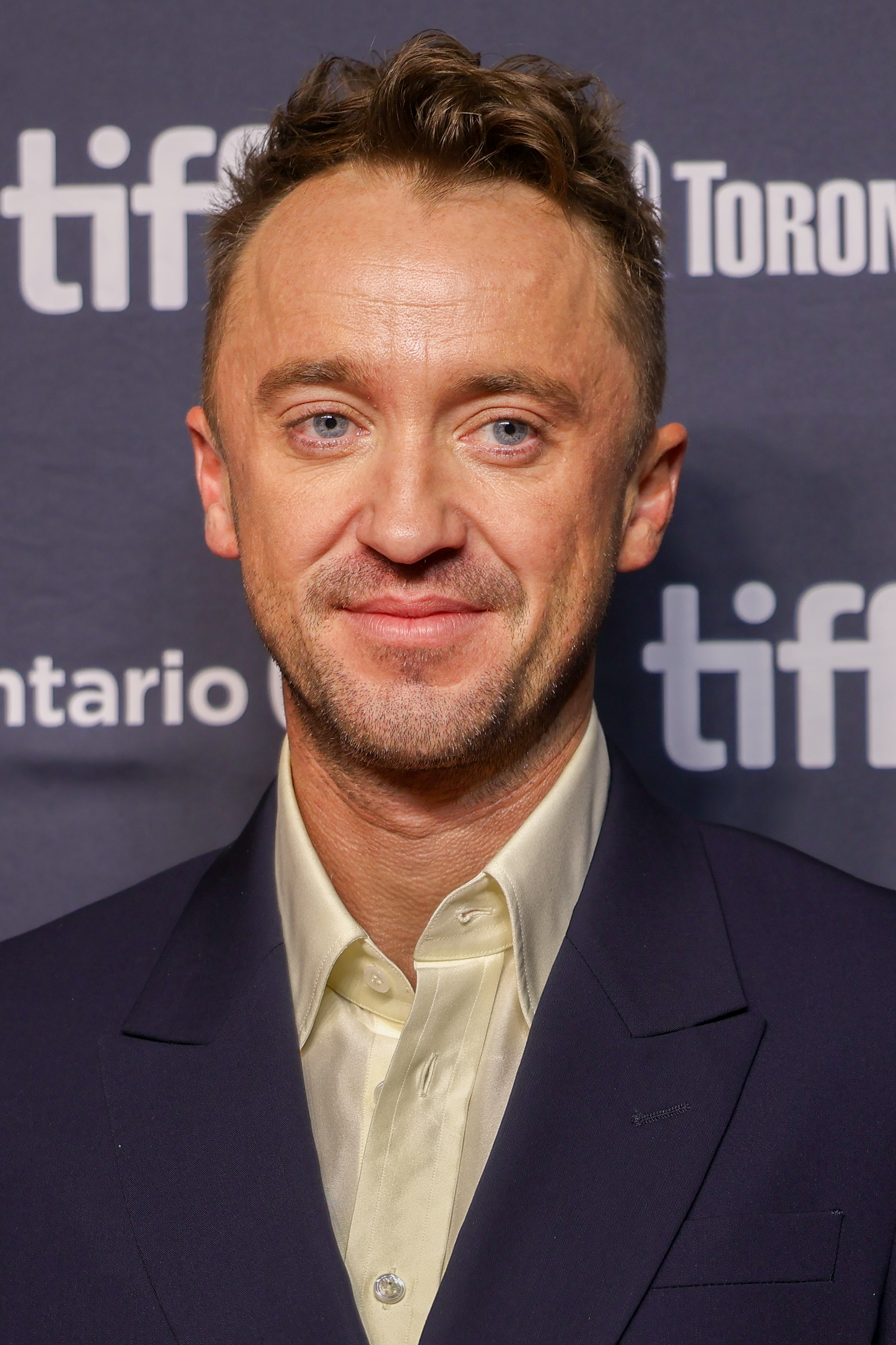
- Felton in 2025
- Born: Thomas Andrew Felton; 22 September 1987 (age 39); Epsom, Surrey, England
- Education: Howard of Effingham School
- Occupations: Actor; musician
- Years active: 1996–present
- Known for: Draco Malfoy in the Harry Potter film series
- Relatives: Nigel Anstey (maternal grandfather)
- Website: tomfelton.com

Thomas Andrew Felton (born 22 September 1987) is an English actor. Born and raised in Surrey, he began appearing in commercials and made his screen debut in the role of Peagreen Clock in The Borrowers (1997). Felton portrayed Louis T. Leonowens in Anna and the King (1999) before being cast as Draco Malfoy in the film adaptations of the fantasy novels Harry Potter, starting with Harry Potter and the Philosopher's Stone (2001) and finishing with Harry Potter and the Deathly Hallows – Part 2 (2011). He also appeared in the science fiction film Rise of the Planet of the Apes (2011). He was subsequently cast in the independent films From the Rough (2011) and The Apparition (2012).

Felton starred as Viscount Trencavel in the historical miniseries Labyrinth (2012) and as James Ashford in the period drama Belle (2013), which released to critical acclaim. In 2015, he recurred as a murder suspect in TNT's Murder in the First. He appeared in Message from the King and A United Kingdom, which premiered at the 2016 Toronto International Film Festival. He portrayed Doctor Alchemy on The CW's The Flash (from 2014), based on the comic books Flash. Felton co-starred in the drama film Feed (2017), the action thriller Stratton (2017), and the biographical film Megan Leavey (2017). He was a series regular on the 2018 science fiction series Origin and appeared as Laertes in Claire McCarthy's Ophelia (2018), both to critical praise. Felton portrayed the villain in the family horror film A Babysitter's Guide to Monster Hunting (2020).

== Early life and education ==
Thomas Andrew Felton was born on 22 September 1987 in Epsom, Surrey, to Peter Felton and Sharon Anstey. He has three older brothers. Felton was raised an Anglican. His parents divorced when he was a teenager. His maternal grandfather is geophysicist Nigel Anstey, who served as Felton's chaperone during filming of the first Harry Potter film and cameoed as one of the Hogwarts professors. Felton cited Nigel as inspiring him to create Draco's sneer.

Felton was educated at West Horsley's Cranmore School until age eleven, and then received his secondary education at the Howard of Effingham School. His schedules were arranged so that he could attend school while filming the early Harry Potter films. The first film was successful earning him positive reviews for his performance. However, his altered appearance, fame and role as an antagonist subjected him to name-calling at school. He said, "But I was walking around with dyed hair and played an evil wizard. It wasn't cool." Felton also admitted to not being a model student. In his memoir, he established a parallel between his then-headmaster, Mr Payne and Dumbledore; Felton developed a belief that Mr Payne understood his behaviour at school stemmed "from an unconscious need to impose some normality into [his] existence" not intentional disruption. Felton developed an interest in singing during his childhood and joined school choirs; he was offered a place in the Guildford Cathedral Choir.

== Career ==
=== 1997–2000: Beginnings ===
Felton began acting in adverts for companies such as Commercial Union and Barclaycard. He landed his first feature film role in when he played the role of Peagreen Clock in Peter Hewitt's The Borrowers (1997). In 1998, Felton voiced James in the television series Bugs. He played witness Thomas Ingham opposite Clive Owen in Second Sight in 1999 and portrayed Louis T. Leonowens in the film Anna and the King (1999), starring opposite Jodie Foster. In 2000, Felton made a guest appearance in Second Sight 2 in the episode "Hide and Seek".

=== 2001–2011: Harry Potter series and recognition ===
In 1999, auditions were held for Harry Potter and the Philosopher's Stone, the film adaptation of J. K. Rowling's novel Harry Potter and the Philosopher's Stone. Felton had not read the books at the time of the auditions, and originally read of the roles of Harry Potter and Ron Weasley before ultimately being cast as Draco Malfoy. (Note: Attributed to multiple references:) Harry Potter and the Philosopher's Stone was released in 2001 to critical and commercial success. The film was praised for its casting, including Felton's; one critic called his performance "the personification of upper-class insolence." Following the film's release, Felton admitted in his memoirs that some people had difficulty making a distinction between him and his character. Initially, Felton was hurt by a fan's comment after the premiere at Odeon Leicester Square, however Nigel Anstey encouraged him to see it as a compliment for his performance by making the character disliked.

He reprised his role the following year in Harry Potter and the Chamber of Secrets (2002), which saw Felton winning a Disney Channel's Kids Award. Felton started his Official Tom Felton Fan Club in 2004 and took part in autograph signing events. His fan club was reported to have attracted so many fans that Felton had to put a temporary stop to people signing up. When a fan asked Felton what kids should do if someone like his character is bullying them, he said: "Tell someone. You do not want to keep it to yourself."

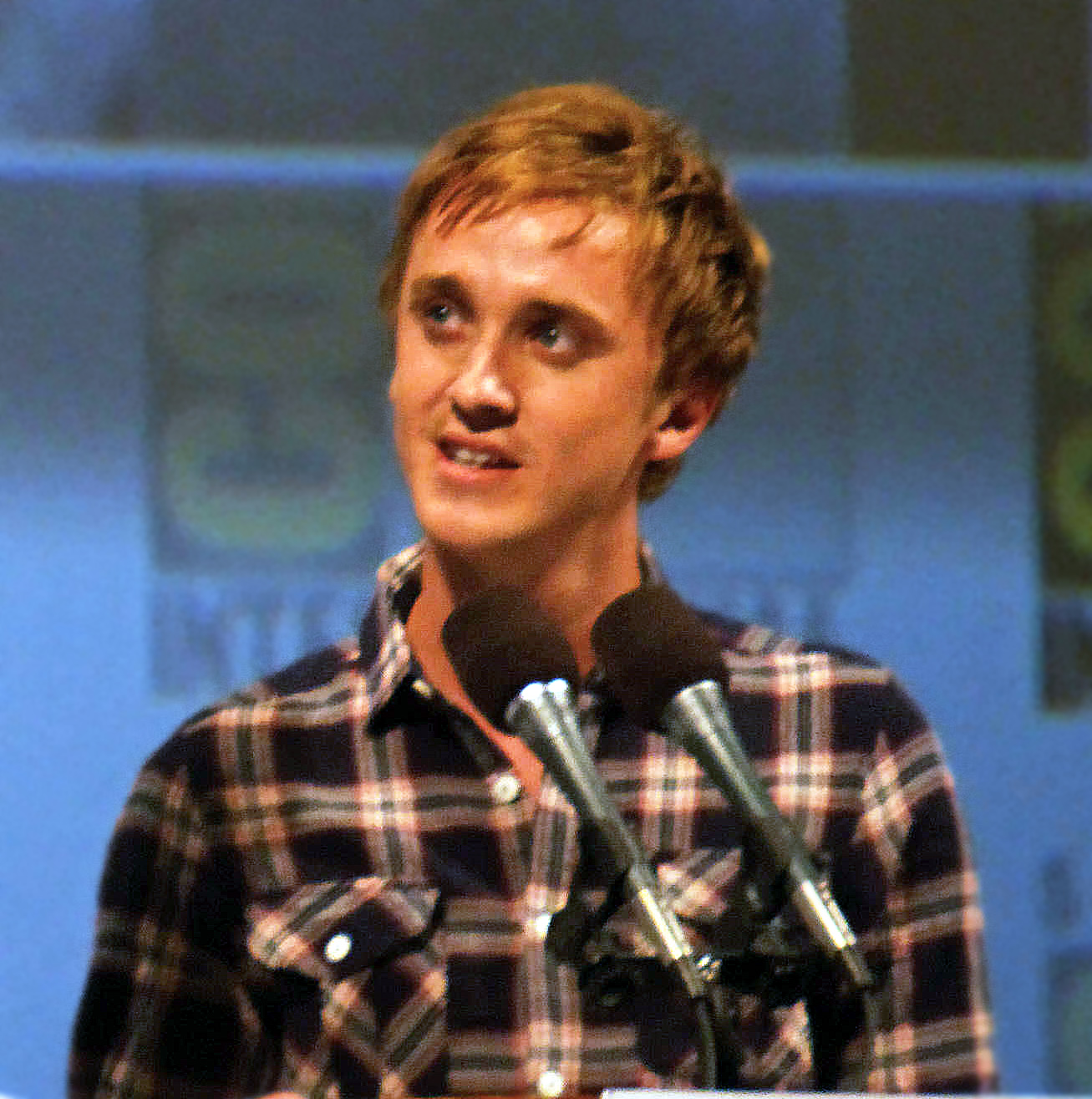
Felton at San Diego Comic-Con promoting Harry Potter and the Deathly Hallows – Part 1 (2010)

Felton appeared in Harry Potter and the Prisoner of Azkaban (2004) and Harry Potter and Goblet of Fire, both released to increasing global recognition. Felton made a guest appearance on Home Farm Twins in 2005, where he played Adam Baker in the short-lived series. On 11 November 2005, he and Rupert Grint presented Liz Carnell with the Daily Mirror's Pride of Britain Award for her work in bullying awareness. Harry Potter and the Order of the Phoenix was filmed in 2006 and released in 2007, becoming the second-highest-grossing film of the year. When asked whether he was looking forward to playing a good guy in the future he answered: "No. Well, I don't know. I suppose for now I'm happy with sticking to what he is. But after the Potter legacy is over I look forward to playing a good guy, or someone different anyway; someone not so spiteful."

In July 2007, Felton visited Children's Hospital in Denver, Colorado, in a pre-screening, charitable event of Harry Potter and the Order of the Phoenix. On 18 March 2011, Felton appeared in a comedy sketch on Red Nose Day 2011 alongside James Corden, Rupert Grint, George Michael, Justin Bieber, Paul McCartney, Ringo Starr, Keira Knightley, Professor Robert Winston, and former UK Prime Minister Gordon Brown.

On 12 November 2008, Felton appeared alongside Jack Osbourne on Adrenaline Junkie as he participated in various challenges in South Africa, including a 60 m (200 ft) bungee jump on Bloukrans Bridge, took a ride in a helicopter, followed by a parachute freefall and came face-to-face with great white sharks. Felton portrayed Simon in the 2009 horror/thriller movie The Disappeared. Harry Potter and the Half-Blood Prince was released in July of that year as a major commercial success; The Hollywood Reporter described Felton's role as "perennially glowering" while the plot of the film "weighs on him, causing his smug veneer to all but melt away."

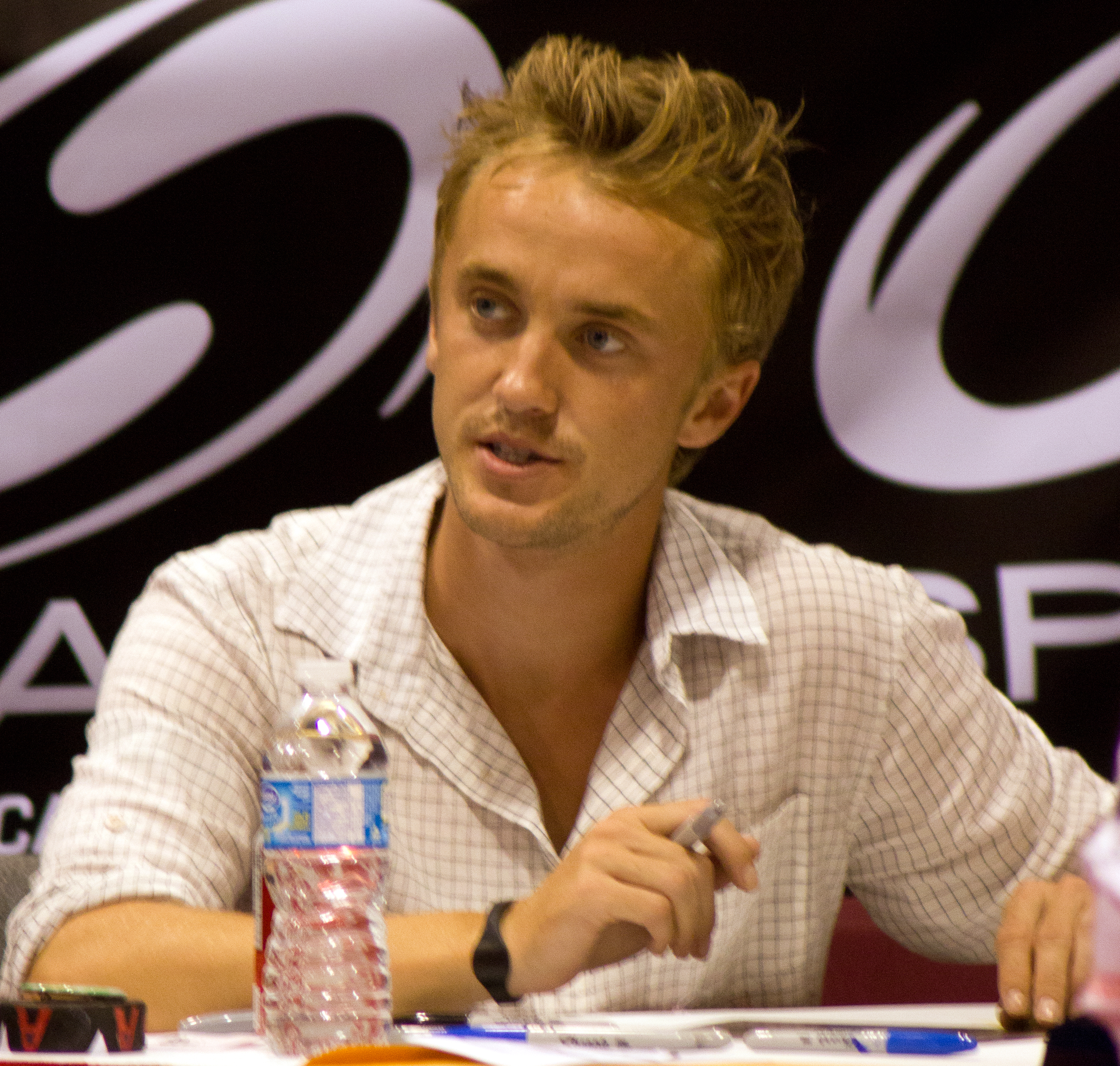
Tom Felton Fan Expo 2011

In 2010, Felton released his original song "Hawaii" on Six String Productions – an independent record label run by Felton, David Proffitt and Philip Haydn-Slater promoting creative independence and ownership of material. Felton portrayed the main character, Ray Marsden, in White Other (2010). His character is a troubled youth in the "ends" of England and stars alongside Harry Potter co-star Imelda Staunton. Felton had a cameo role in Get Him to the Greek (2010) in June. He portrayed the character Dodge Landon in the 2011 science-fiction film Rise of the Planet of the Apes, and played a paranormal investigator in the thriller film The Apparition (2012). Felton reprised his role as Malfoy for the final time in Harry Potter and the Deathly Hallows – Part 1 and Harry Potter and the Deathly Hallows – Part 2. His performances in Harry Potter and the Half-Blood Prince and Harry Potter and the Deathly Hallows – Part 1 won him two consecutive MTV Movie Awards for Best Villain in 2010 and 2011. Screen Rant stated that Felton "brought the complex, layered" character to the films, calling Malfoy the series' "true cult hero".

While filming the Harry Potter series, Felton and fellow actress Emma Watson (who played Hermione Granger in the films) both confessed to having crushes on each other during filming, albeit at different times. In the foreword to Felton's memoir, Beyond the Wand: The Magic and Mayhem of Growing Up a Wizard, Watson called herself and Felton "soulmates".

=== 2012–2021: Post-Harry Potter projects ===
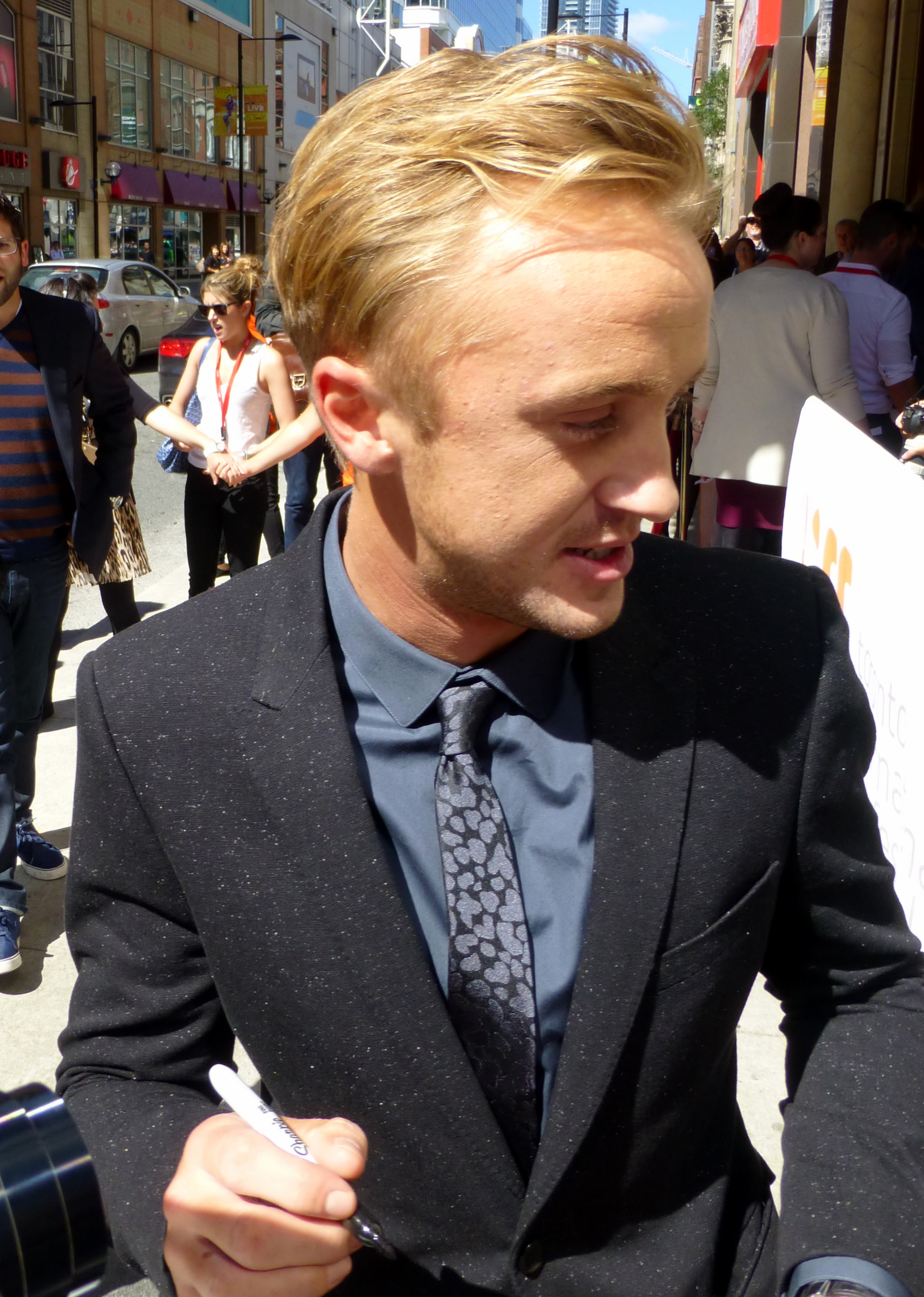
Felton at the premiere of Belle at the 2013 Toronto Film Festival

Felton posted three music videos on YouTube under the account "Feltbeats", in which he performs fragments of original songs. Nine songs have been re-recorded and are now available on iTunes: "Time Well Spent", "Time Isn't Healing", "One of These Days", "Under Stars", "Right Place, Right Time", "In My Arms", "All I Need", and "I Will Be There" join the instrumental "Silhouettes in Sunsets". He also recorded an album titled In Good Hands. It includes the six songs "If You Could Be Anywhere", "We Belong", "When Angels Come", "Convinced", "Father of Mine", and "If That's Alright with You".

In 2012, Felton appeared in the supernatural horror film The Apparition alongside an ensemble cast and indie drama From the Rough opposite Taraji P. Henson. Felton portrayed James Ashford, an arrogant member of nobility, in Belle (2013), which was released at the Toronto International Film Festival to critical praise. He starred opposite Elizabeth Olsen as Camille Raquin in Thérèse (2013). The film received mixed reviews; Roger Ebert referred to his performance as "suitably foppish and dopey" for the role. Felton starred in Labyrinth as Viscount Trencavel, which aired on Channel 4 in March 2013. Felton portrayed a US Navy airman in survival drama Against the Sun (2014), which faced mixed reception.

In 2015, Felton recurred in Murder in the First on TNT as Erich Blunt:, as a Silicon Valley worker and murder suspect. Felton held supporting roles in films Risen (2016), a box office success, as well as Message from the King and A United Kingdom, both of which premiered at the 2016 Toronto International Film Festival. (Note: Attributed to multiple references:) He also lent his voice to the English version of Sheep and Wolves (2016), a fantasy-comedy film. From 2016 to 2017, He appeared as Doctor Alchemy in the third season of The CW's The Flash. Felton's character was a CSI lab partner to the titular character and love interest of Killer Frost. Felton portrayed a dog handler for the US Army in Gabriela Cowperthwaite's Megan Leavey (2017), a biographical indie drama based on the life of Corporal Megan Leavey. That year, Felton also appeared in drama film Feed and action-thriller Stratton.

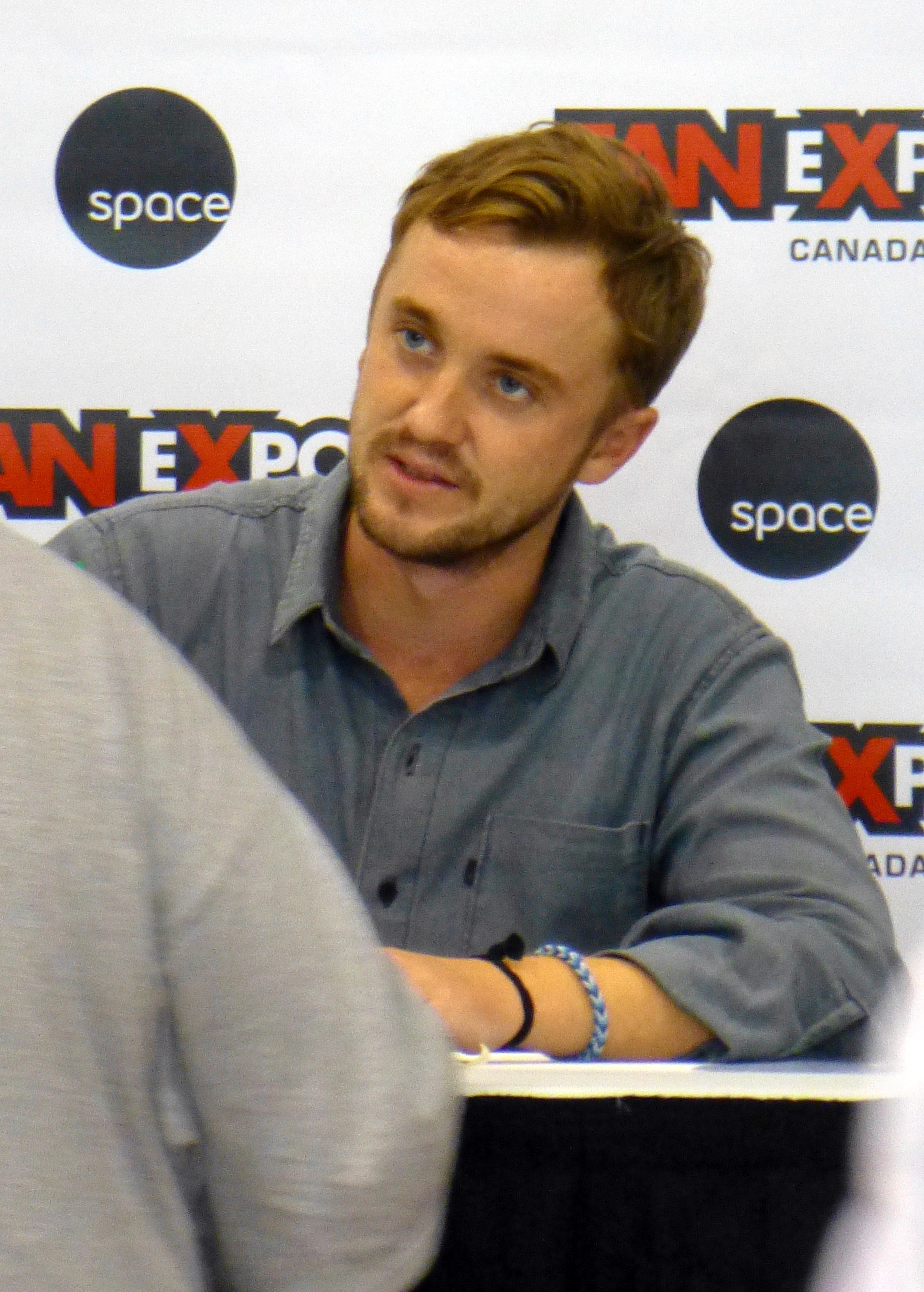
Felton in September 2015

On 26 April 2018, it was announced that Felton was cast in the science fiction series Origin. He stars in the role of Logan Maine opposite actress Natalia Tena. It premiered on YouTube Premium in November 2018. The series opened to mixed reviews; The Hollywood Reporter stated that Felton portrayed "explosive whiner ... unrecognizable from his days as bad boi fa lyfe Malfoy." Felton portrayed Laertes in Ophelia, Claire McCarthy's film adaptation of Hamlet centering around the character of Laertes. The film premiered at the 2018 Sundance Film Festival; one critic remarked his performance as "lithe" and "done nicely". Felton appeared in the comedy-drama Braking for Whales in 2019 and the Netflix family-horror A Babysitter's Guide to Monster Hunting in 2020. He played a British soldier in the Dutch World War II film The Forgotten Battle, which had a red carpet premiere in 2020 followed by a Netflix release in 2021.

In June 2020, he was planned to star in war thriller Burial, which is set in the last days of World War II. In October, it was announced that Felton will star in Canyon Del Muerto, a biopic about archaeologist Ann Axtell Morris. He portrays her husband, Earl H. Morris, a US archaeologist known for his contributions to archaeology in the Southwest US. Two months later, Felton was confirmed in Lead Heads alongside Rupert Everett, Derek Jacobi, Luke Newberry and Mark Williams. The film is described as a "drama about greed and the repercussions it has on the soul."

In January 2021, Felton was confirmed for the lead role in Sara Sugarman's Save The Cinema which began filming in the month in Wales. He joined Jonathan Pryce and Samantha Morton. The movie tells the true story of Liz Evans, a hairdresser and leader of a youth theatre in Carmarthen, Wales, who began a campaign in 1993 to save the Lyric theatre from closure.

=== 2022–present: West End theatre debut and Beyond the Wand ===
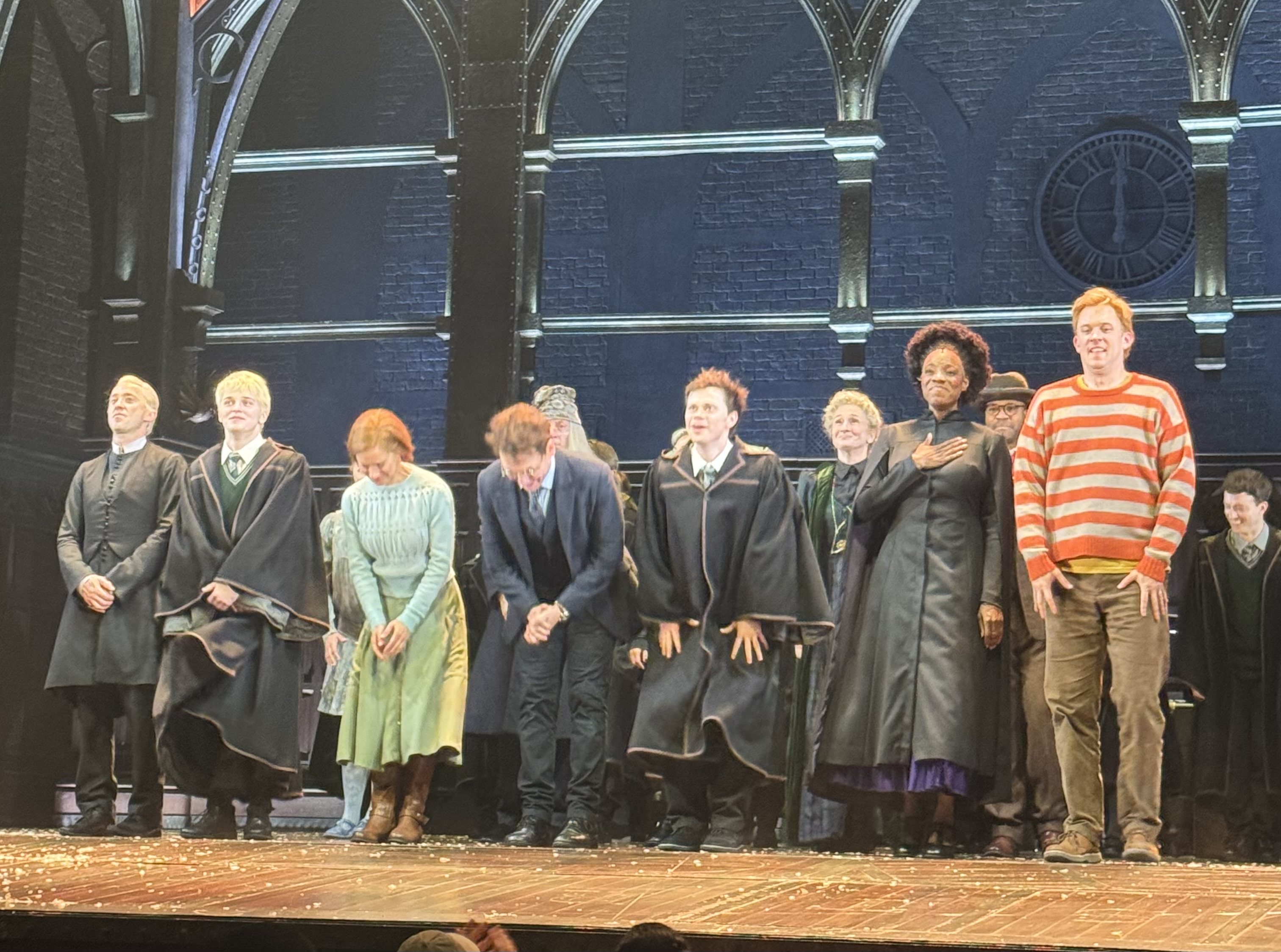
Felton (first from left) with the Broadway cast of Cursed Child, July 2026

In early 2022, Felton starred in the Harry Potter 20th Anniversary: Return to Hogwarts retrospective television special as himself, alongside his Harry Potter co-stars including Daniel Radcliffe, Emma Watson, and Rupert Grint. In May 2022, Felton made his West End theatre debut in London, in the play 2:22 A Ghost Story. In October 2022, Felton published a memoir, Beyond the Wand: The Magic and Mayhem of Growing Up a Wizard, which covers his acting career within the Harry Potter franchise. The book debuted at number one on The New York Times Best Seller list and number one on the Publishers Weekly Bestseller List selling 33,703 units.

Felton appeared in the 2023 thriller Some Other Woman. He starred as Leon in the sci-fi/action film Altered (2024) alongside Igor Jijikine, Richard Brake, and more. Felton played Josiah Oldfield in the Indian television series Gandhi, directed by Hansal Mehta. In June 2025, it was announced that Felton would reprise his role as Draco Malfoy from the Harry Potter films, doing so in the Broadway run of the stage play Harry Potter and the Cursed Child in autumn 2025. Shortly after the news broke, Felton was a presenter at the 78th Tony Awards, held in 2025. His first appearance on the opening night of Harry Potter and the Cursed Child in November 2025 earned him a standing ovation mid-show. Felton is scheduled to stay with the show through 3 January 2027.

== Personal life ==
Felton was in a relationship with stunt assistant Jade Olivia Gordon from April 2008 until early 2016. Gordon played Felton's character's wife, Astoria Greengrass, in Harry Potter and the Deathly Hallows – Part 2. Despite speculation from fans, he and Emma Watson, his childhood crush, have never dated. During filming of Harry Potter and the Prisoner of Azkaban, Felton helped Watson deal with fame.

Prior to appearing in the film Risen, Felton identified as agnostic.

== Filmography ==
=== Film ===
Key
†	Denotes films that have not yet been released

Year	Title	Role	Notes	Ref.
1997	The Borrowers	Peagreen Clock		
1999	Anna and the King	Louis T. Leonowens		
2001	Harry Potter and the Philosopher's Stone	Draco Malfoy	Released as Harry Potter and the Sorcerer's Stone in the US	
2002	Harry Potter and the Chamber of Secrets	Draco Malfoy		
2004	Harry Potter and the Prisoner of Azkaban	Draco Malfoy		
2005	Harry Potter and the Goblet of Fire	Draco Malfoy		
2007	Harry Potter and the Order of the Phoenix	Draco Malfoy		
2008	The Disappeared	Simon Pryor		
2009	Harry Potter and the Half-Blood Prince	Draco Malfoy		
2010	Harry Potter and the Deathly Hallows – Part 1	Draco Malfoy		
2010	Get Him to the Greek	Himself	Cameo	
2010	13Hrs	Gary Ashby		
2011	Harry Potter and the Deathly Hallows – Part 2	Draco Malfoy		
2011	Rise of the Planet of the Apes	Dodge Landon		
2012	The Apparition	Patrick		
2012	From the Rough	Edward		
2013	Belle	James Ashford		
2013	In Secret	Camille Raquin		
2014	Against the Sun	Tony Pastula		
2016	Risen	Lucius Tyco Ennius		
2016	Message from the King	Frankie		
2016	A United Kingdom	Rufus Lancaster		
2016	Sheep and Wolves	Grey (voice)	English dub	
2017	Megan Leavey	Andrew Dean		
2017	Feed	Matt Grey		
2017	Stratton	Cummings		
2018	Ophelia	Laertes		
2019	Braking for Whales	Brandon Walker		
2020	A Babysitter's Guide to Monster Hunting	The Grand Guignol/The Boogey Man		
2020	The Forgotten Battle	Captain Tony Turner		
2022	Burial	Lukasz		
2022	Save the Cinema	Richard Goodridge		
2023	Some Other Woman	Peter		
2024	Altered	Leon		
2025	Fackham Hall	Archibald Davenport		
2026	They Will Kill You	Kevin Sullivan		
TBA	As Deep as the Grave †	Earl H. Morris	Post-production	

=== Television ===
Year	Title	Role	Notes	Ref.
1998	Bugs	James	Episode: "Pandoras' Box"	
1999	Second Sight	Thomas Ingham	Television film	
2000	Second Sight 2: Hide and Seek	Thomas Ingham	Television film	
2005	Home Farm Twins	Adam Baker	Unknown episodes	
2013	Labyrinth	Viscount Trencavel	Television miniseries	
2013	Full Circle	Tim Abbott	Television miniseries	
2014	Murder in the First	Erich Blunt	Main role (season 1)	
2015	Tom Felton Meets The Superfans	Interviewer	Directorial debut	
2016–2017	The Flash	Julian Albert / Alchemy	season 3, 17 episodes	
2018	Origin	Logan Maine	Main role (10 episodes)	
2021	Harry Potter: Hogwarts Tournament of Houses	Himself	Special appearance (3 episodes)	
2021	(K)nox: The Rob Knox Story	Himself	Documentary film	
2022	Harry Potter 20th Anniversary: Return to Hogwarts	Himself	HBO Max Special	
2025	Gandhi	Josiah Oldfield	Indian TV series; main role	

=== Theatre ===
Year	Title	Role	Venue	Notes	Ref.
2022	2:22 A Ghost Story	Sam	Criterion Theatre	West End	
2025–2027	Harry Potter and the Cursed Child	Draco Malfoy	Lyric Theatre	Broadway	

=== Video games ===
Year	Title	Role	Notes
2007	Harry Potter and the Order of the Phoenix	Draco Malfoy (voice)	
2009	Harry Potter and the Half-Blood Prince	Draco Malfoy (voice)	
2010	Harry Potter and the Deathly Hallows – Part 1	Draco Malfoy (voice)	

=== Music videos ===
Year	Title	Role	Artist
2018	Empty Space	Jake	James Arthur

=== Theme park attractions ===
Year	Title	Role
2010	Harry Potter and the Forbidden Journey	Draco Malfoy

== Discography ==
=== EPs ===
- Time Well Spent (2008)
- All I Need (2008)
- In Good Hands (2009)
- Hawaii (2011)
- YoOHoO (2021)
- ReD (2024)
- ORaNgE (2024)
- YelLoW (2024)

=== Singles ===
- "Silhouettes in Sunsets" (2008)
- "Time Isn't Healing" (2008)
- "If You Could Be Anywhere" (2010)
- "hOLDing on" (2021)

== Awards and nominations ==
Year	Work	Award	Category	Result	Refs
2001	Harry Potter and the Philosopher's Stone	Young Artist Award	Best Ensemble in a Feature Film	Nominated	
2001	Harry Potter and the Philosopher's Stone	Young Artist Award	Best Performance in a Feature Film: Supporting Young Actor	Nominated	
2009	Harry Potter and the Half-Blood Prince	MTV Movie Award	Best Villain	Won	
2009	Harry Potter and the Half-Blood Prince	Scream Award	Best Ensemble	Won	
2010	Harry Potter and the Deathly Hallows – Part 1	MTV Movie Award	Best Villain	Won	
2010	Harry Potter and the Deathly Hallows – Part 1	Teen Choice Award	Choice Movie Villain	Won	
2011	Harry Potter and the Deathly Hallows – Part 2	MTV Movie Award	Best Cast	Won	
2011	Harry Potter and the Deathly Hallows – Part 2	Scream Award	Best Ensemble	Nominated	
2015	Belle	National Film Awards UK	Best Actor	Nominated	
2026	Harry Potter and the Cursed Child	iHeart Radio Music Awards	Favorite Broadway Debut	Won	

== Bibliography ==
- — (13 October 2022). Beyond the Wand: The Magic and Mayhem of Growing Up a Wizard. London: Ebury Spotlight. ISBN 978-1-5291-4941-8.

== See also ==
- List of Harry Potter films cast members

== Print sources ==
- Felton, Tom (2023). Beyond the Wand: The Magic and Mayhem of Growing Up a Wizard (Paperback ed.). London: Ebury Publishing. ISBN 9781529149432.
