= As Deep as the Grave =

- Directed by: Coerte Voorhees
- Written by: Coerte Voorhees
- Produced by: Coerte Voorhees; John Voorhees
- Starring: Abigail Lawrie; Tom Felton; Hanako Footman; Ewen Bremner; Tatanka Means; Wes Studi; Finn Jones; Jacob Fortune-Lloyd; Abigail Breslin
- Cinematography: Juergen Heinemann; Samuel Pearce
- Production companies: A Visionary Film; First Line Films New Mexico; LaVia is-the-way Productions; MC Films; The Vladar Company
- Country: United States
- Language: English

As Deep as the Grave is an upcoming American historical action adventure film written and directed by Coerte Voorhees. It stars Abigail Lawrie, Tom Felton, Hanako Footman, Ewen Bremner, Tatanka Means, Wes Studi, Finn Jones, Jacob Fortune-Lloyd, and Abigail Breslin. A fully AI-generated version of Val Kilmer also features in a "significant part" of the film.

== Premise ==
The film follows the true story of North America's first female archaeologist, Ann Axtell Morris (1900–1945), who along with her husband Earl H. Morris (1889–1956) worked with the Navajo in 1920s in Canyon de Chelly, Arizona to uncover North America's first civilization – the Ancestral Puebloans, or "Anasazi".

== Cast ==
- Abigail Lawrie as Ann Axtell Morris
- Tom Felton as Earl H. Morris
- Hanako Footman as Elizabeth Bixler
- Ewen Bremner as Sylvanus G. Morley
- Tatanka Means as Seechi
- Wes Studi as Tsali
- Finn Jones as Charles Lindbergh
- Jacob Fortune-Lloyd as Jean Charlot
- Abigail Breslin as Anne Morrow Lindbergh
- Val Kilmer (AI recreation) as Father Fintan

== Production ==
In October 2020, it was reported that Coerte Voorhees would be writing and directing a historical action adventure film titled Canyon Del Muerto, starring Abigail Lawrie, Tom Felton, Abigail Breslin, Tatanka Means, Jacob Fortune-Lloyd, Wes Studi, Finn Jones, Ewen Bremner, and Hanako Footman.

Principal photography began in November 2020. The production was originally slated to include Val Kilmer, but proceeded without him due to his throat cancer diagnosis. Kilmer died of complications of pneumonia on April 1, 2025, at the age of 65. Filming occurred in New Mexico and Arizona in collaboration with the Navajo Nation. After his death, Kilmer's likeness and voice were generated exclusively using generative artificial intelligence and "appear in a 'significant part' of the film"; he had not filmed any scenes at the time of his death.

In March 2026, details shared include that it had been retitled to As Deep as the Grave, and that Voorhees used artificial intelligence to complete the scenes featuring Kilmer's likeness with the cooperation of Kilmer's family estate and the support of his children.
