= Lucy Clarke =

English novelist

- Born: Lucy Jane Clarke; 1981 (age 44–45); Bournemouth, England
- Education: Cardiff University
- Years active: 2001–present
- Spouse: James Cox
- Children: 2
- Website: lucy-clarke.com

Lucy Jane Clarke (born 1981) is an English novelist. She is known for writing destination thrillers, including The Sea Sisters (2013), The Castaways (2020), One of the Girls (2022) and The Hike (2023).

== Early life ==
Clarke is from Bournemouth. Clarke attended St Peter's Catholic School. She studied English literature at Cardiff University.

== Career ==
Clarke's early publications included Student Survival Guide, which she co-authored during with her university flatmate Jenny Hawkins and published during their third and final year at Cardiff in 2001, and the self-published novel Surf Wax & Vodka Jelly in 2006.

In 2011, Clarke signed her first book deal with HarperCollins, through which she published the novel The Sea Sisters in 2013. It also had a U.S. release under the title Swimming at Night. The novel was a Richard & Judy Book Club pick.

This was followed by A Single Breath in 2014, The Blue in 2015, Last Seen in 2017 and You Let Me In in 2018.

Clarke's next novel was The Castaways, which became a Sunday Times bestseller. Clarke signed a further two books with HarperCollins in 2020 to follow The Castaways, starting with One of the Girls (working title The Hen Weekend) in 2022. One of the Girls was a Richard & Book Club pick.

Clarke moved to the HarperFiction imprint in 2023 with a two-book deal. Also that year, her novel The Hike was published. The Surf House was published in 2025.

== Adaptations ==
Paramount+ premiered two television adaptations of Clarke's novels in 2023: No Escape (based on The Blue) starring Abigail Lawrie and Rhianne Barreto and The Castaways starring Sheridan Smith and Céline Buckens.

In 2023, Urban Myth Films optioned the rights to adapt The Hike for series.

As of 2026, a television adaptation of Clarke's The Surf House directed by Ed Lilly was in development at Netflix.

== Personal life ==
As of 2013, Clarke lived in Tuckton. She married windsurfer James Cox.

== Bibliography ==
=== Novels ===
- Surf Wax & Vodka Jelly (2006)
- The Sea Sisters (2013) (aka Swimming at Night)
- A Single Breath (2014)
- The Blue (2015) (aka No Escape)
- Last Seen (2017)
- You Let Me In (2018)
- The Castaways (2020)
- One of the Girls (2022)
- The Hike (2023)
- The Surf House (2025)
- Wish You Were Here (2027)

=== Non-fiction ===
- Student Survival Guide (2001) with Jenny Hawkins
