= No Escape (TV series) =

Television series

- Based on: The Blue by Lucy Clarke
- Screenplay by: Kris Mrksa
- Directed by: Hans Herbots
- Starring: Abigail Lawrie; Rhianne Barreto
- Country of origin: United Kingdom
- Original language: English
- No. of series: 1
- No. of episodes: 7

Production
- Executive producers: Kris Mrksa; Elaine Pyke; Willow Grylls
- Producer: Lee Thomas
- Cinematography: Helen Chapman; Malcolm Crowe
- Editor: Danny Elesen
- Running time: 52–60 minutes
- Production companies: New Pictures; Viacom International Studios

Original release
- Network: Paramount+
- Release: 18 May 2023

No Escape is a British television series adapted by Kris Mrksa from the Lucy Clarke novel The Blue. Developed by New Pictures and Viacom International Studios, the series stars Abigail Lawrie and Rhianne Barreto and is directed by Hans Herbots. The series premiered on Paramount+ in the UK, Ireland, and Canada on 18 May 2023.

== Synopsis ==
Two best friends, Lana and Kitty, are escaping their lives in the UK, and hitch a trip on a yacht called The Blue in the Philippines.

== Cast ==
- Abigail Lawrie as Lana, a British woman who leaves the country with her foster sister, Kitty and becomes a former crew member of The Blue
- Rhianne Barreto as Kitty, a British woman who leaves the country with her foster sister, Lana, who is also on the run. She is also becomes a crew member of The Blue
- Jay Ryan as Aaron Winbourne, an Australian and Captain of The Blue. He is also the older brother of Denny
- Sean Keenan as Dennis "Denny" Winbourne, an Australian crew member of The Blue and younger brother of Aaron
- Colette Dalal Tchantcho as Shell, an American crew member of The Blue
- Elmo Anton Stratz as Heinrich, a German crew member of the Blue
- Narayan David Hecter as Joseph, a half French, half Filipino crew member of The Blue. He is spiritual even though he was raised a devout Catholic
- Susie Porter as Chief Inspector Sarah Craven
- Josh McConville as DS Paul Christie
- Gary Sweet as Peter Winbourne, the father of Aaron and Denny and husband of Rachel
- Anne Looby as Rachel Winbourne, the mother of Aaron and Denny and wife of Peter
- Jake Macapagal as Colonel Justin Reyes, a Filipino police chief who is investigating multiple crimes

== Production ==
The series is adapted by Kris Mrksa, with Hans Herbots on board as lead director. Initially called The Blue, the series is produced by New Pictures and Viacom International Studios. Executive producers include Kris Mrksa, Elaine Pyke and Willow Grylls. In January 2024, the series was removed from Paramount+.

=== Filming ===
Filming took place on location during 2022 in Thailand and on the sailing yacht The Blue.

== Broadcast ==
The show was broadcast on Paramount+ in the UK, Ireland, and Canada from 18 May 2023.

It was released on Paramount+ in Australia in July 2023.

== Reception ==
Saskia Kemsley in the Evening Standard gave the series 4 stars out of 5, praising the lead performances, and the pacing of the script as well as the idyllic locations.

Craig Mathieson, writing in The Age, gave it 3 stars, writing "This seaborne British thriller is capable throughout, but it is so tightly focused on the machinations of its plot and an aesthetic of tropical menace that it sometimes lacks self-examination".
