= Sylvanus Morley =

American archaeologist and epigrapher (1883–1948)

Sylvanus Griswold Morley
- Morley in 1924
- Born: June 7, 1883; Chester, Pennsylvania
- Died: September 2, 1948 (aged 65); Santa Fe, New Mexico
- Education: • Pennsylvania Military College (1904, civ. eng.) • Harvard (1907 AB; 1908 MA)
- Known for: •Maya region archaeology and directorship of Carnegie programs • research on Maya calendar and inscriptions • "Old Empire" theory of Classic-era Maya polities • excavations at Chichen Itza • popular writings in archaeology • World War I espionage • Publicizing Uaxactún, bestowing its name.
- Scientific career
- Fields: Archaeology and epigraphy
- Workplaces: • School of American Archaeology (1907–13) • Carnegie Institution of Washington (1913–40) • School of American Research and Museum of New Mexico (1946–48, director)

Sylvanus Griswold Morley (June 7, 1883 – September 2, 1948) was an American archaeologist and epigrapher who studied the pre-Columbian Maya civilization in the early 20th century. Morley led extensive excavations of the Maya site of Chichen Itza on behalf of the Carnegie Institution and published several large compilations and treatises on Maya hieroglyphic writing. He also wrote popular accounts on the Maya for a general audience.

To his contemporaries, "Vay" Morley was one of the leading Mesoamerican archaeologists of his day. Although more recent developments in the field have resulted in a re-evaluation of his theories and works, his publications, particularly on calendric inscriptions, are still cited. In his role as director of various projects sponsored by the Carnegie Institution, he oversaw and encouraged many others who later established notable careers in their own right. His commitment and enthusiasm for Maya studies helped inspire the necessary sponsorship for projects that would ultimately reveal much about ancient Maya civilization.

Morley also conducted espionage in Mexico on behalf of the United States during World War I, but the scope of those activities only came to light well after his death. His archaeological field work in Mexico and Central America provided suitable cover for his work with the United States' Office of Naval Intelligence investigating German activities and anti-American activity.

== Early life, education and first expeditions ==
Morley was born in Chester, Pennsylvania, the eldest of six children. His father, Colonel Benjamin F. Morley, was at the time vice-president and professor of chemistry, mathematics and tactics at Pennsylvania Military College (PMC). His mother Sarah also had a connection with the college, where her father Felix de Lannoy had been a professor of Modern Languages. Felix (Sylvanus' maternal grandfather) was an immigrant to the United States from newly independent Belgium, where his father had been a judge in the Belgian Supreme Court.

When Morley was ten years old, he moved with his family to Colorado, and his secondary education was completed at Buena Vista and Colorado Springs. It was during his later schooling in Colorado that Morley first developed an interest in archaeology, and in particular Egyptology. However his father—a man trained in the hard sciences and who had graduated at the top of his class in civil engineering at PMC—was initially unsupportive of his ambitions. Seeing little scope for employment opportunities in archaeology, the Colonel encouraged his son to study engineering instead. Sylvanus duly enrolled in a civil engineering degree at PMC, graduating in 1904.

Nonetheless immediately upon graduating from PMC Sylvanus got his wish, and was able to attend Harvard University in pursuit of an undergraduate degree in archaeology. The focus of his studies at Harvard shifted from Ancient Egypt to the pre-Columbian Maya, at the encouragement of Peabody Museum director F. W. Putnam and the young Alfred Tozzer, a recently appointed professor at Harvard's Anthropology department. Morley's interest in the Maya may have stirred even earlier than this, according to his student contemporary at Harvard and later colleague Alfred V. Kidder. The 1895 novel Heart of the World by H. Rider Haggard, based on tales of the "lost cities" of Central America, was a particular favorite of the young Morley.

Morley graduated with an A.B. in American Research from Harvard in 1907. His first field trip to Mexico and Yucatán was in January of the same year, when he visited and explored several Maya sites, including Acanceh, Labna, Kabah, Uxmal, Zayil, and Kiuic. He spent several weeks at Chichen Itza as a guest of Edward Thompson, where he assisted with the dredging of the Cenote Sagrado. On his return trip to the US he carried with him artifacts taken from the cenote, to be deposited at Harvard's Peabody Museum.

In the summer of 1907, Morley went to work for the School of American Archaeology (SAA) in Santa Fe, New Mexico, where for two months he undertook fieldwork in the American Southwest. Here he studied the sites and architecture of the ancient Pueblo peoples (Anasazi). Morley made some significant contributions to the definition of a particular "Santa Fe" style of pre-Columbian architecture.

After the assignment Morley went to work permanently for the SAA, and over the next several years alternated his fieldwork assignments between the Southwest, and Mexico and Central America. Morley completed a Master of Arts degree at Harvard, awarded in 1908.

== Carnegie Institution and Chichen Itza proposal ==
In 1912, at the urging of executive committee member William Barclay Parsons, the Carnegie Institution announced it would fund a department of anthropology. In December the board announced it was seeking proposals for an appropriate project; three proposals were submitted, including one from Morley to explore and excavate Chichen Itza.

The Institution approved Morley's proposal in December 1913 and one month later hired him to direct the project, but instability in Yucatán (an aftershock of the Mexican Revolution) and the World War, among other factors, would postpone action on the proposal for a decade. Excavation work at Chichen Itza did not begin until the 1923–24 field season.

While the Chichen Itza project was on hold, Morley conducted several expeditions in Mexico and Central America on behalf of the Carnegie Institution. He also published his first major work, An Introduction to the Study of Maya Hieroglyphs (1915).

== Espionage work ==
During the First World War (1914–1918), Morley gathered intelligence about and reported on the movements of German operatives in the region, information in which the U.S. Government had a keen interest. According to subsequent investigations, Morley was one of a number of ONI operatives working in the region under the guise of conducting scholarly research. Their mission was to seek out evidence of pro-German and anti-American agitation in the Mexico-Central America region and to look for secret German submarine bases (which proved non-existent). Morley's archaeological work provided a ready excuse to travel the countryside armed with photographic equipment, and he himself traveled more than 2,000 miles (over 3,200 km) along the coastlines of Central America in search of evidence for German bases.

Several times Morley needed to convince suspicious soldiers of his bona fides, and was almost unmasked on occasion. In one incident in 1917, Morley was prevented from photographing an old Spanish fort by a party of Honduran soldiers who had been distrustfully monitoring his presence. He protested strongly to the local authorities, proclaiming his credentials as an archaeologist ought to be above suspicion. The local authorities remained unmoved, and only when Morley had arranged for a letter of introduction signed by the Honduran president Francisco Bertrand did they allow him to continue.

Morley produced extensive analyses (he filed over 10,000 pages of reports) on many issues and observations of the region, including detailed coastline charting and identification of political and social attitudes which could be viewed as "threatening" to U.S. interests. Some of these reports bordered on economic spying, detailing the activities of local competitors and opponents of large U.S. companies present in the region, such as the United Fruit Company and International Harvester.

As his later work proved, Morley was also a genuine scholar and archaeologist with an abiding interest in the region. However, his research activities in this period seem to have played a largely secondary role to his espionage duties. The authors of research into his spying proclaim Morley "arguably the best secret agent the United States produced during World War I". Shortly after the war several of Morley's contemporaries voiced their misgivings over the duplicitous nature of the espionage work that Morley and several of his colleagues had been suspected of. One notable critic, the famous anthropologist Franz Boas, published a letter of protest in the December 20, 1919 edition of The Nation. Without naming the suspected archaeologists, Boas' letter denounced these Central American operatives who had "prostituted science by using it as a cover for their activities as spies". Ten days after the letter was published, the American Anthropological Association censured Boas for this action in a 21-to-10 formal vote on a resolution distancing the AAA from Boas' views. The ethical debate surrounding such "archaeologist-spies" continues into the present, with some commentators noting the dangers and suspicion it throws upon others engaged in legitimate archaeological fieldwork, particularly those who work or seek to work in "sensitive" government-controlled areas.

== Fieldwork in Mexico and Central America ==
Morley was to devote most of the next two decades to fieldwork in the Maya region, overseeing the seasonal archaeological digs and restoration projects, returning to the United States in the off-season to give a series of lectures on his finds. Although primarily involved with the work at Chichen Itza, Morley also took on responsibilities which extended Carnegie-sponsored fieldwork to other Maya sites, such as Yaxchilan, Coba, Copán, Quiriguá, Uxmal, Naranjo, Seibal and Uaxactun. Morley rediscovered the last of these sites (located in the Petén Basin region of Guatemala, to the north of Tikal). Believing that there must be many more as-yet unknown ancient Maya sites in the area, Morley advertised a "bounty" in return for news of such sites to the local chicleros, who ranged through the jungles seeking exploitable sources of natural gum; in due course he was rewarded with the information which led to its rediscovery. He also bestowed its name, uaxactun, from the Mayan languages, after a stela inscription he found there which recorded a Maya Long Count Calendar date in the 8th cycle (i.e., "8-tuns"; the name could also literally mean "eight stones").

During this time, Morley established a reputation for trustworthiness with the local Yucatec Maya around Mérida, who were still suffering from the depredations of the Caste War of Yucatán against the Mexican government. Over the years, he was to act almost as their representative in several matters, although he was equally careful not to upset the Mexican and U.S. governments.

His directorship over all of the Institute's activities in the Maya region soon ran into difficulty. Because of cost and schedule overruns as well as criticisms of the quality of some of the research produced, the Carnegie board began to believe that managing multiple projects was not Morley's forte. In 1929, the overall directorship of the programme was passed to A. V. Kidder, and Morley was left to concentrate on Chichen Itza.

Apart from the archaeological investigations which were the main purpose of the Carnegie programme's efforts under Morley, the programme also sponsored the undertaking of comparative field research on modern Yucatec Maya communities. This research, conducted in the 1930s and led by the anthropologist Robert Redfield as a Carnegie research associate, collected data and examined the cultural contrasts of indigenous Maya experience at four "levels" of community — a traditional indigenous village, a peasant village, a town, and a city — which were analyzed in social anthropological terms as 'types' representing different degrees of societal isolation and homogeneity.

Slightly built and not noted for possessing a strong constitution, Morley saw his health deteriorate over the years spent laboring in the Central American jungles under often adverse conditions. Several times, he was incapacitated by recurring bouts of malaria and he had to be hospitalised after separately contracting colitis and then amoebic dysentery the following year. During the 1930s, it also became evident that he had developed cardiac difficulties, which would plague him for the remainder of his life. Nevertheless, although he "detested" the jungle conditions, he persevered in his work with evident enthusiasm.

In between overseeing the projects and conducting his own researches, Morley published several treatises on Maya hieroglyphics and his interpretations on their meaning. These include a survey of inscriptions at Copán (1920) and a larger study (a massive tome of over 2,000 pages in five volumes) encompassing many of the sites he had investigated in the Petén region (1932–38).

== Excavations at Chichen Itza ==
=== Context ===
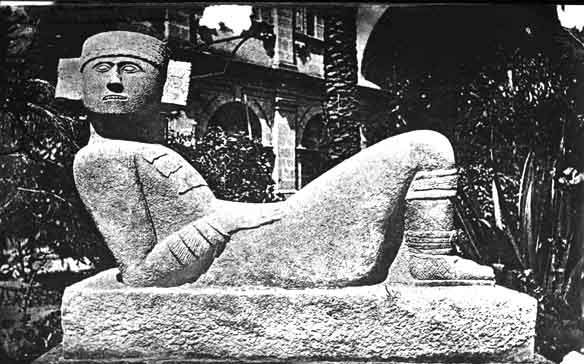
A Chac Mool statue, first identified by le Plongeon but later extensively documented by Morley's Chichen Itza excavations. This type of statue (whose purpose remains unclear, presumed to relate to ritual sacrifice) is also characteristic of Toltec sites, and thus provided a linkage between Chichen Itza and Central Mexico.

Chichen Itza is about 120 km (75 miles) southeast of Mérida, on the inland plains of north-central Yucatán. It had been known to Europeans since the first recorded visits by the 16th century conquistadores. During the conquest of Yucatán, the Spanish attempted to establish a capital at Chichén Itzá, but resistance by Maya in the region drove them out after several months of occupation. When the Spanish returned to Yucatán in 1542 they finally succeeded in establishing a capital at another Maya city, T'ho (or Tiho), which they renamed Mérida.

Chichen Itza had evidently been functionally abandoned long before the Spanish first came, although the local indigenous Yucatec Maya still lived in settlements nearby, and even within its former boundaries (but in recently built wooden huts, not the stone buildings themselves). The name "Chichen Itza" is known from the earliest recorded Spanish accounts —such as Diego de Landa's— of these local inhabitants, for whom the site had long been a place of pilgrimage and ceremony. The name (chich'en itza in modern Yukatek orthography) means roughly "mouth of the well of the Itza", the "well" being the nearby Sacred Cenote (water-filled sinkhole) and "Itza" being the name of the people who were reputed to be its former inhabitants. Over the next three centuries after the Conquest, the site remained relatively undisturbed until the arrival of Stephens and Catherwood, although several plantations were established nearby.

At the time its full extent was not at all clear, but today it is recognised as one of the largest Maya sites in the Yucatán region. How long ago the site had been functionally abandoned (not including the ongoing presence of local Maya farmers) was not immediately apparent, although it appeared to have been recently, in comparison with the seemingly older abandoned sites of the central and southern Maya region.

=== Carnegie Project initiated ===
Morley with Addie Worth Bagley Daniels and Josephus Daniels at Chichen Itza.

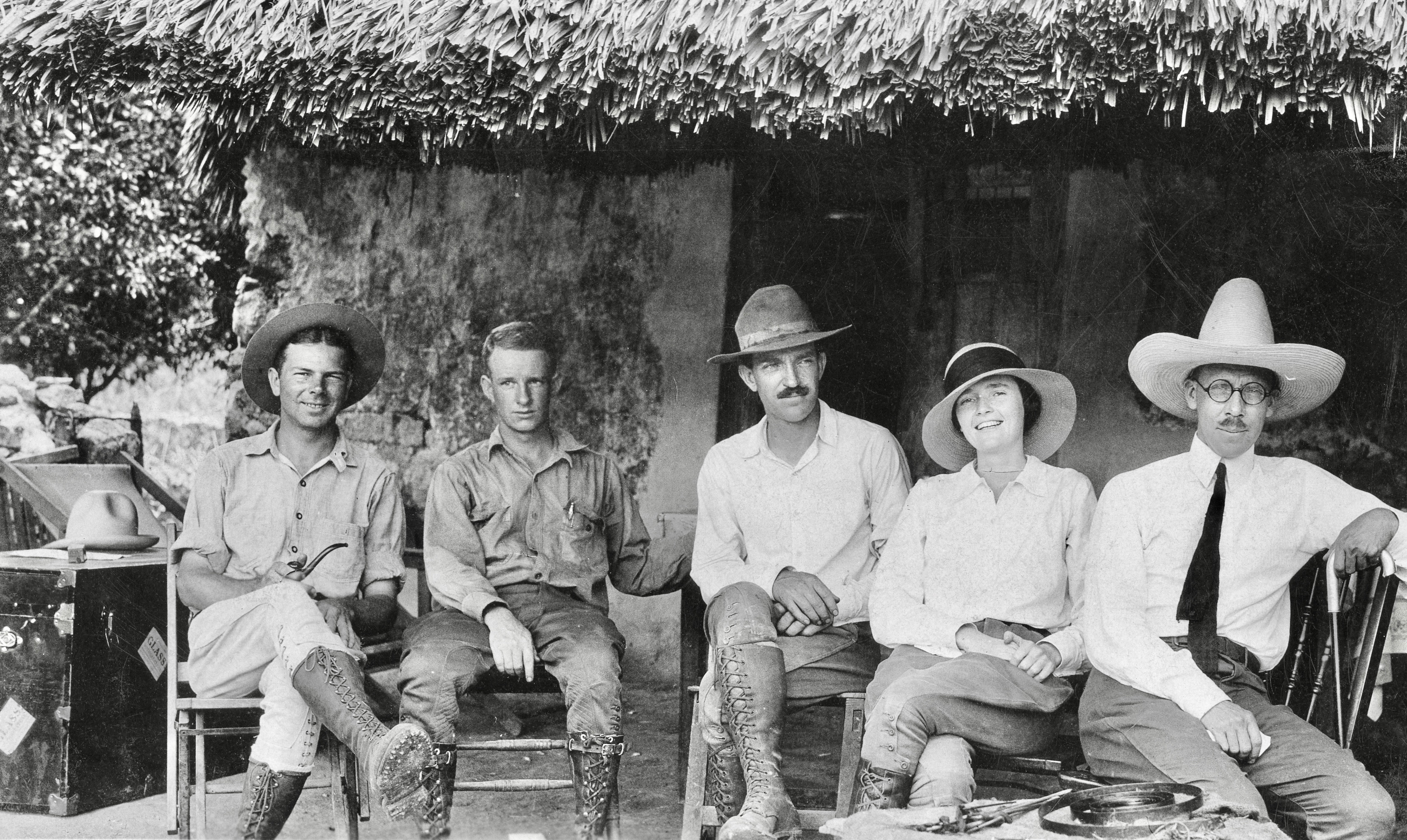
Chichen Itza Project staff in 1924. Morley is the rightmost one.

By 1922 the turbulent political situation in Mexico had stabilized somewhat, clearing the way for work to begin on the Carnegie Institution's Chichen Itza project. Morley and Carnegie Institution President Charles Merriam visited Chichen Itza in February 1923. The Mexican government was already at work restoring the massive pyramid, El Castillo. Morley gave Merriam a tour of the area he believed would be best for excavation and restoration, a mound complex then known as the Group of One Thousand Columns (which included the Temple of Warriors).

When Morley and his team returned in 1924 to commence their excavations, Chichen Itza was a sprawling complex of several large ruined buildings and many smaller ones, most of which lay concealed under mounds of earth and vegetation. Some areas of the site had been surveyed, photographed and documented in the late 19th and early 20th centuries by Desire Charnay, Augustus Le Plongeon, Teoberto Maler, Alfred Maudslay, Eduard Seler, and Edward H. Thompson, although only Le Plongeon and Thompson had conducted any significant excavation, and their efforts would pale in comparison to the Carnegie project.

=== Major finds ===
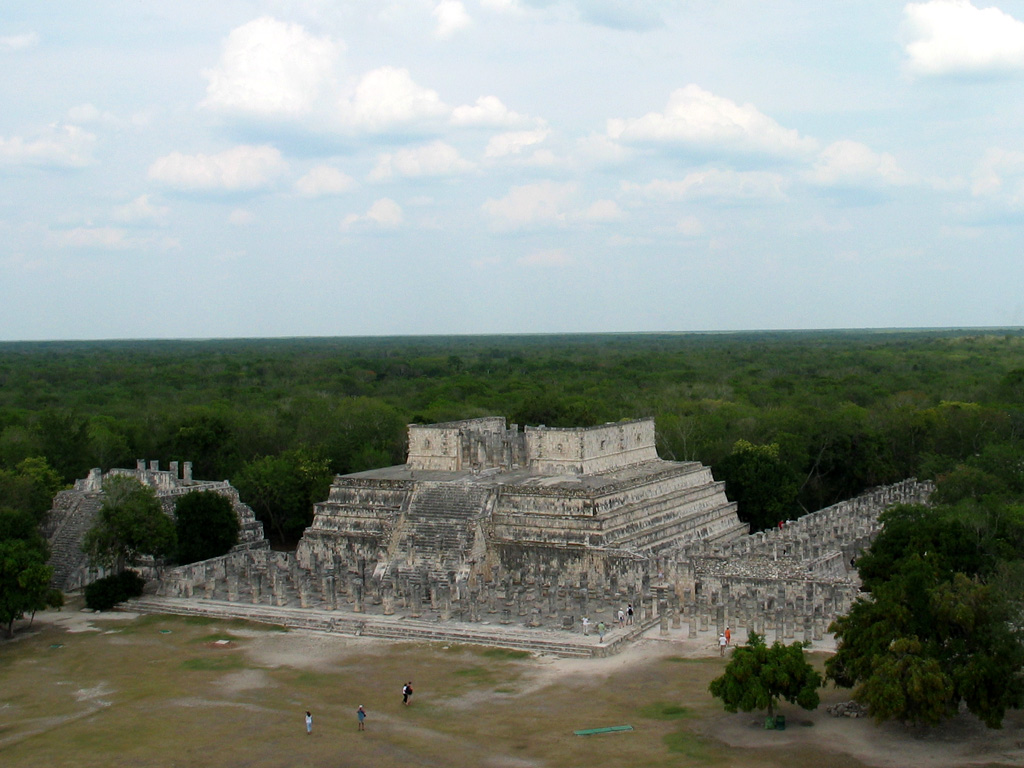
The "Temple of the Warriors", excavated by Morley's team. The rows of the "Thousand Columns" can be seen in its foreground, and extending off to the right.

In 1924, armed with a renewable ten-year digging concession from the Mexican government, Morley, his field director Earl H. Morris, artists Ann Axtell Morris and Jean Charlot, and several others began their first explorations. They selected an area within what appeared to be the central plaza of the site, where the capitals of some columns lay exposed. Much to their surprise they uncovered row upon row of free-standing columns — surprising since such columns hardly ever figured in Classic Maya architecture. This complex (now called the "Complex of a Thousand Columns", although the columns number fewer than one thousand), un-Maya-like in both execution and arrangement, added confirmation to earlier speculations that Chichen Itza was something of an enigma. This arrangement had much more in common with the architectural styles of civilizations in central Mexico (more than a thousand kilometres away) than that of the Classic or Pre-Classic Maya. In particular, this complex and some others which were gradually revealed appeared to have much in common with structures built at Tula, believed to be the capital of the Toltecs and which was located about 100 km north of present-day Mexico City.

Over the next few seasons, the team expanded their digs, recovering other anomalous structures from the earthen mounds, such as the Temple of the Jaguar and the Temple of the Warriors. In 1927 they discovered an older structure underneath this latter, which they called the "Temple of the Chacmool" after a further example found of this distinctive statuary. These structures had frescoes which again exhibited a non-Maya style, or at least a hybrid of Maya and non-Maya. They also worked on the reconstruction of el Caracol, a unique circular building believed (and later confirmed) to be an observatory. A separate archaeological dig, this one under the Mexican government, had also commenced working the site; the two projects divided the areas to excavate, continuing side-by-side for several years, in a somewhat guarded but nonetheless cordial fashion.

While Morris oversaw day-to-day operations, and Charlot sketched the murals, Morley occupied himself with copying all the inscriptions he could find, particularly the date portions. Since most of these inscription dates at the site were recorded in an abbreviated form known as the "Short Count", which only identified an event within a span of about 260 years, it was difficult to pin down in which particular span an event referred to in the inscriptions occurred. Towards the end of the project Morley's work on these was to be superseded somewhat by a more-comprehensive analysis made by Hermann Beyer in 1937. In this work, Beyer would note:

I frequently have differed with the opinions of Dr. Sylvanus G. Morley. This is easily explained by the fact that he is one of the few archaeologists who have studied the hieroglyphs of Chichen Itza. While I agree with his results on the inscriptions of the Old Empire cities which contain many dates and time periods, I find that his method of dealing solely with calendrical matter fails at Chichen Itza, since there are but few hieroglyphs of that nature.

The later years of the project would increasingly concentrate on completing the restorative work on the principal structures, for Morley always had an eye on the dual purpose of the project: to research, but also rebuild to generate the promised revenue from tourism.

=== Result summary ===
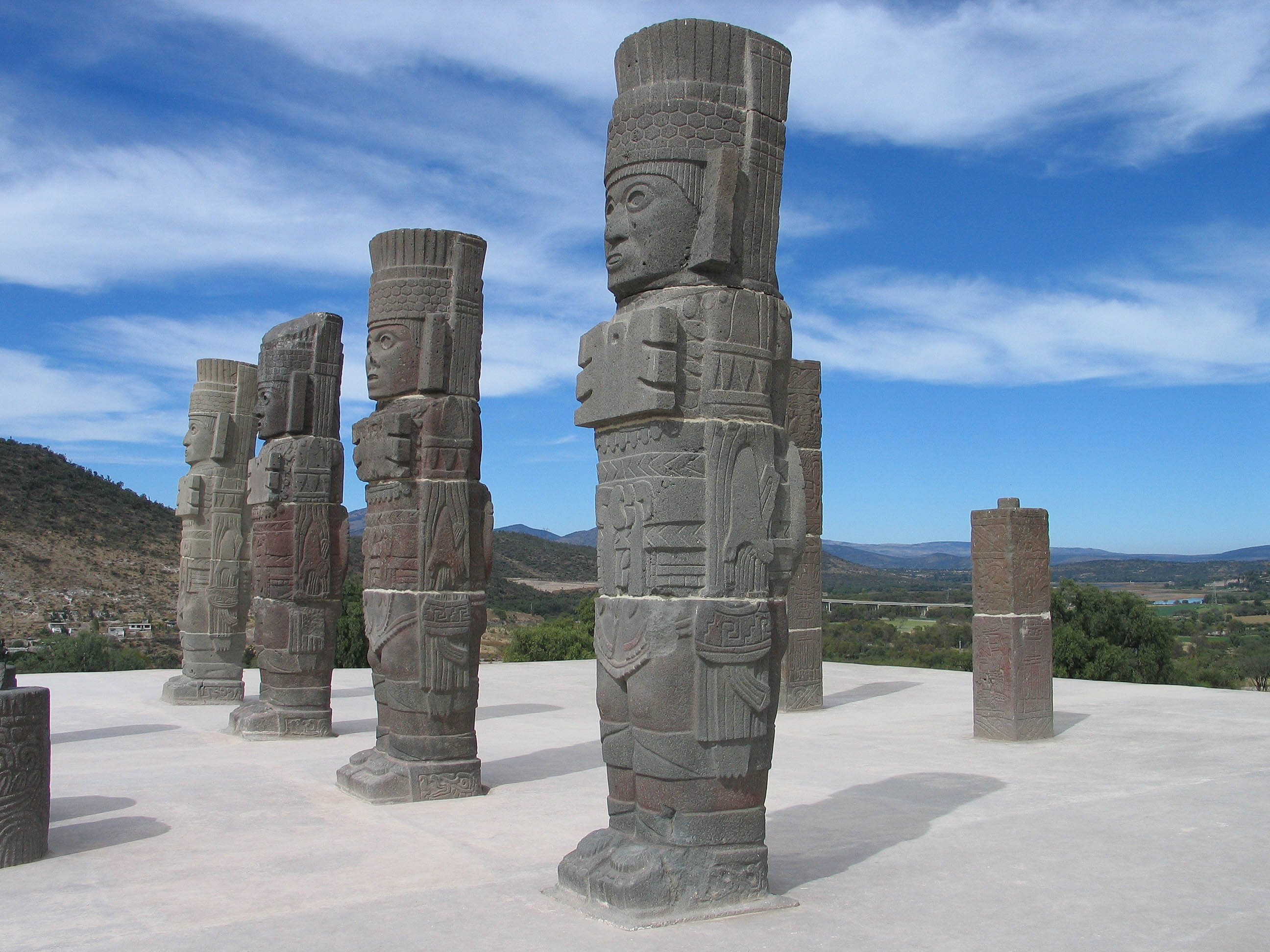
Columnar statues in the form known as the "Atlantean figures" or "Atlantids", representing Toltec warriors. The examples shown here are from the Toltec site of Tula (Tollan), north of Mexico City; similar examples and styles found at Chichen Itza by Morley provided further evidence of Maya cultural exchange with central Mexico.

The net research result of their excavations revealed Chichen Itza to be an unusual mixture of building styles: not only was there a wide variety of Maya styles such as Puuc, Rio Bec and Chenes, but a significant presence of Mexican influences such as El Tajín, but more particularly Toltec. The evidence indicated that the site had been inhabited since at least the mid-Classic, but that a particular florescence had occurred in the Post-Classic, when the site was apparently a major power. From the combined results of their work, that of others, and some documented tales of contact-era Maya peoples, a view was formed that Chichen Itza had actually been invaded and conquered sometime in the 10th century by Toltec warriors from the far west, who maintained their hold over the local Maya for another century or so, only in turn to be replaced by a later mixed Maya-Mexica group known as the Itza. Later evidence suggested that the actual year of this invasion was 987, and identified its leader with a legendary Toltec ruler called Topiltzin Ce Acatl Quetzalcoatl after the Mesoamerican deity Quetzalcoatl (K'ulk'ulkan in Yucatec).

Morley was in general opposed to ideas that other external groups had influenced the Maya, but in this case, since the conquest occurred in the "degenerate" Post-Classic phase he found it acceptable. This view of the Toltec invasion of Yucatán became the one maintained by the majority of Mayanists. However, recent research from the mid-1990s onwards has now questioned this orthodoxy, to the point where many now hold an actual invasion did not take place, but the similarities in style are largely due to cultural diffusion and trade, and that in fact there is evidence that the diffusion in this period flowed in both directions.

The chronology of Chichen Itza continues to be a source of debate, and the hoped-for answers to the mystery of the Classic Maya decline elusive (wholesale "Mexicanisation" by invading forces ruled out by the lack of these indicators in the central and southern sites). However, the Carnegie excavations did add significantly to the corpus of available information, and are notable for their scope alone, if not for fine details and quality of research. The site's reconstruction by Carnegie has proved to be a lasting one, and the site today is among the most visited of pre-Columbian ruins in all of Central America and Mexico, with in excess of a million visitors per year.

== Project completion and final years ==
After almost twenty years, Carnegie's Chichen Itza project wound to a close in 1940, its restorative and investigative work complete and its objectives substantially met. Morley and his second wife Frances moved from the Hacienda Chichén, their home for many years, and rented the Hacienda Chenku, now within the city of Mérida, Yucatán.

After the close of the Chichen Itza Project, Morley began spending more time in Santa Fe, New Mexico, where he had lived half of the year every year since 1910. He was elected to the American Philosophical Society in 1940. He was appointed director of the School of American Research and the Museum of New Mexico, following the death of Edgar Lee Hewett in 1946. He also began work on a large-scale popular work on ancient Maya society, which he completed and published in 1946. The Ancient Maya was to be one of his more successful works (outside of his popular writings in magazines), and has been posthumously revised and reprinted several times, although since the 1980s Morley's name is no longer listed as the main author.

Morley last visited Yucatán and the Hacienda Chenku in spring of 1948, just months before his death. He escorted a party to the ruins of Uxmal in February, on what was possibly his last visit to a Maya ruin. He died in Santa Fe on September 2, 1948, aged 65, two years after the publication of The Ancient Maya. He was buried in a plot in Santa Fe's Fairview Cemetery; his second wife Frances Rhoads Morley was interred in the same plot upon her death in 1955.

Morley's personal research library is preserved and available for consultation at the Laboratory of Anthropology Library in Santa Fe, New Mexico.

== Theories and retrospective assessment ==
An example of one of Sylvanus Morley's drawings of Maya hieroglyphic inscriptions, taken from his 1915 publication. This illustrates the text appearing on a lintel in the Chichen Itza building commonly known as the "Temple of the Initial Series", as it is the only inscription for the site known to show a Maya Long Count Calendar date. The date shown here (starting row 2, ending at A5) is 10.2.9.1.9 9 Muluk 7 Sak (equivalent to July 30, 878 CE).

In his day, Morley was widely regarded as one of the leading figures in Maya scholarship, in authority perhaps second only to Eric Thompson, whose views he mostly shared. From the late 1920s through to perhaps the mid-1970s, the reconstruction of ancient Maya society and history pieced together by Morley, Thompson and others constituted the "standard" interpretation against which competing views had to be measured. However, major advances made in the decipherment of Maya hieroglyphic writing and refinements in archaeological data which have been made since that time have now called into question much of this former "standard" interpretation, overturning key elements and significantly revising the Maya historical account. As far as Morley's own research is concerned, its reputation for soundness and quality has been downgraded somewhat in the light of recent reappraisals; yet he is still regarded as an important contributor to the field.

=== Influences on other scholars ===
Many Mayan scholars and archaeologists had their first research opportunity and employment under Morley's tutelage working on the various Carnegie projects. Of these, perhaps the two most notable were J. Eric S. Thompson and Tatiana Proskouriakoff. Thompson shortly became the field's most dominant figure and its uncontested expert. Together with Morley, he was most responsible for promulgating the view of the ancient Maya as peaceable astronomers, obsessed with time and calendric observations. This view became the prevailing one for the next several decades. Proskouriakoff also went on to establish a stellar career and a lifelong association with the Carnegie Institution; however, her researches ultimately provided the primary convincing evidence which later disproved much of what had been maintained by Thompson and Morley.

In 1925, a young English Cambridge anthropology student named John Eric Sidney Thompson wrote to Morley seeking employment with the Carnegie programme on digs in Central America. Thompson had studied Morley's 1915 work and from that taught himself Maya calendrics, which were a particular passion for Morley. The Carnegie Institution at Morley's urging accordingly hired Thompson, and he soon found himself at work in Chichen Itza, involved with its architectural reconstruction (for which task Thompson had no particular qualifications). During the 1925–26 season, Thompson became well-acquainted with Morley, the two of them along with their wives (the newly married Thompson was in fact on his honeymoon) making several side-trips together. However, at the end of the 1926 season, Thompson left Carnegie's employ to take up a post offered by Chicago's Field Museum of Natural History. This post offered Thompson far greater freedom and diversity for his research. Thompson and Morley were to remain close and like-minded colleagues in spite of this move.

Towards the end of the Chichen Itza project, Morley came across the drawings of a young artist and draftsperson, Tatiana Proskouriakoff, who as an unpaid excavator had accompanied a 1936–37 University of Pennsylvania Museum expedition to the Maya site of Piedras Negras. The quality of her reconstructive panorama drawings (depicting what the site "might have looked like" when in use) so impressed Morley that he determined to enroll her onto the Carnegie staff. However, this was in the midst of the Great Depression and funds for hiring were scarce; it was also not clear whether Morley had the appropriate authority to do so. After several entreaties, Morley again came up with an innovative funding scheme whereby he devised two campaigns to raise money by subscription to send Proskouriakoff to Copán and the Yucatán. These were successful, and in 1939, Proskouriakoff transferred onto the Carnegie payroll and was duly dispatched to Copán to gather data for reconstructive drawings of that site. Morley's support of Proskouriakoff was to prove fortuitous to Maya scholarship, as she went on to a lengthy and successful career with the Carnegie Institution and was lauded as one of the foremost Maya scholars of her time.

=== Views on ancient Maya society ===
Morley maintained that ancient Maya society was essentially a united theocracy, and one which was almost exclusively devoted to astronomical observations and mystically noting (even "worshipping") the passage of time. These ideas (which Thompson's later work would develop to its fullest extent) are now extensively modified, and although astronomical and calendric observations were clearly important to the Maya, the people themselves are now seen in more historical, realistic terms—concerned also with dynastic succession, political conquests, and the lives and achievements of actual personages.

He also believed that the southern centers such as Copán and Quiriguá had been united in the Classical period under what he termed the "Old Empire". This empire mysteriously collapsed, but the remnants later migrated to the northern sites (such as Chichen Itza) to form a "New Empire". It is now generally accepted that at no time was the Maya region united under a single polity, but rather that individual "city-states" maintained a somewhat independent existence, albeit one with its fluctuating conquests and local subservience to more dominant centers. In support of his view, Morley devised a 4-tier classification system of relative importance, which he ascribed to all of the then-known main Maya sites (about 116); many more sites are now known, and his classification system is now seen as an arbitrary one, contradicted in places by the sites' texts which can now be (substantially) read.

Other ideas Morley put forward include the proposal that the ancient Maya were the first in Mesoamerica to domesticate maize (Zea mays ssp. mays), with the wild variety known as teosinte being its progenitor. Recent genetic studies have shown Morley to be largely correct in this, although the beginnings of its domestication (12,000 to 7,500 years ago) pre-dates the establishment of anything resembling Maya society. In general, Morley held that the ancient Maya had been the pre-eminent civilization of Mesoamerica, from which other cultures had drawn their influences. It is now accepted that other societies (such as the Zapotec and Olmec) preceded that of the Maya and the influences—such as development of writing and the Mesoamerican calendars—were rather the other way around; even in the later stages of Maya history, their region came under significant influences drawn from central Mexico, such as the Toltec "invasion". However, the Maya did also exert a widespread influence over neighboring contemporary cultures, one which was significant and not to be overlooked.

=== Maya writing ===
In common with most other Maya scholars, Morley was particularly interested in the mysterious nature of the Maya script. The essentials of the calendric notation and astronomical data had been worked out by the early 20th century, and by the 1930s John E. Teeple had solved (with Morley's encouragement) the glyphs known as the "Supplementary Series", proving that these referred to the lunar cycle and could be used to predict lunar eclipses. However, the bulk of the texts and inscriptions still defied all attempts at decipherment, despite much concerted effort. It was Morley's view, and one that found wide support, that these undeciphered portions would contain only more of the same astronomical, calendric and perhaps religious information, not actual historical data. He wrote in 1940, "time, in its various manifestations, the accurate record of its principal phenomena, constitutes the majority of Maya writing." He also wrote that he doubted that any toponym would be found in the texts. He supposed that the Maya writing system was one based chiefly upon ideographic or pictographic principles, and that if present any elements of phoneticism would always be "overshadow[ed]" by the ideographic meaning assigned to each glyph." That is to say, in Morley's view each glyph substantially represented words, ideas and concepts in toto, and did not separately depict the individual language sounds as spoken by the scribes who had written them (with the possible exception of an occasional rebus-like element, as had already been demonstrated for Aztec writing).

The convincing evidence which was to overturn this view became known only after Morley's death, starting with Yuri Knorozov's work in the 1950s. Over the next decades other Mayanists such as Proskouriakoff, Michael D. Coe, and David H. Kelley would further expand upon this phonetic line of enquiry, which ran counter to the accepted view but would prove to be ever more fruitful as their work continued. By the mid-1970s, it had become increasingly clear to most that the Maya writing system was a logosyllabic one, a mixture of logograms and phonetic components that included a fully functional syllabary.

These realizations led to the successful decipherment of many of the texts which had been impenetrable (and almost "dismissed") by Morley and the "old school". In retrospect, these breakthroughs may have been realized earlier had it not been for Morley's, and later Eric Thompson's, almost "on principle" position against the phonetic approach. Consequently, most of Morley's attempts to advance understanding of the Maya script have been superseded.

Morley's particular passion was the study of the Maya calendar and its related inscriptions, and in this respect, he made useful expositions that have withstood later scrutiny. His talent was not so much to make innovations, but rather to publicise and explain the workings of the various systems. He was particularly proficient at recovering calendar dates from well-worn and weathered inscriptions, owing to his great familiarity with the various glyphic styles of the tzolk'in, haab' and Long Count elements. Yet in his focus on calendric details, he would often overlook or even neglect the documentation of other non-calendric aspects of the Maya script; the comprehensiveness of some of his publications suffered much as a result. Some leading figures from a later generation of Mayanists would come to regard his publications as being inferior in detail and scope to that of his predecessors, such as Teoberto Maler and Alfred Maudslay — poorer quality reproductions, omitted texts, sometimes inaccurate drawings.

=== Archaeology ===
As a director of archaeological excavation projects, Sylvanus Morley was well regarded and liked by his colleagues and his Carnegie board employers, his later movement to "lighter duties" notwithstanding. The reconstructions of Chichen Itza and other sites were widely admired; but in terms of the research output and the resulting documentation produced, the legacy of these projects did not quite amount to what might have been expected to come from such a lengthy investigation. For some later Maya researchers, "...in spite of seventeen years of research at Chichén Itzá by Carnegie, this world-famous city yet remains an archaeological enigma"; it is comparatively little-understood given the amount of work which had gone into it under Morley's direction. Coe also comments that many talented people such as Thompson would spend more time in restoring the site for later tourism than in actual research. Thompson himself would later remark in reference to his time working for Carnegie: "...in my memory it seems that I personally shifted every blessed stone."

=== Summation ===
Despite the later reassessments that were to somewhat dull the shine of his achievements, Sylvanus Morley remains a notable and respected figure in Maya scholarship. His publications are now generally superseded, except for his calendrical compilations. His epigraphic work, which was his personal abiding interest ("bringing home the epigraphic bacon" was a favorite quote of his), is likewise generally outdated, although it was widely supported for several decades after his death. Perhaps the contributions that today remain the most relevant arise from his instigation of the Carnegie research programmes, his enthusiasm and support shown to other scholars, and the undeniable successes in the restorative efforts that have made the Maya sites justly famous. He had particular talents in communicating his fascination for the subject to a wider audience, and in his lifetime became quite widely known as perhaps the quintessential model of an early 20th-century Central American scholar and explorer, complete with his ever-present pith helmet. Some have even speculated that his life and exploits may have provided some of the inspiration for the character of Indiana Jones in the Spielberg films; the Carnegie Institute itself mentions that it might also have been Morley's field director at Chichen Itza, Earl Morris.

Sylvanus Morley was also to be remembered as a spokesman and representative of the Maya peoples, among whom he spent so much of his time, and who otherwise lacked the means to directly address some of their concerns with the wider public.

== Major works ==
Morley's publications include:

- 1915 – An Introduction to the Study of Maya Hieroglyphs
- 1920 – The Inscriptions of Copán
- 1938 – The Inscriptions of Petén (5 vols.)
- 1946 – The Ancient Maya (Palo Alto: Stanford University Press, 1946; revised 3rd ed. issued in 1956 by G. W. Brainerd)

In addition to his scholarly work, Morley thought it important to share his enthusiasm for the ancient Maya with the public. He wrote a popular series of articles about the Maya and various Maya sites in the National Geographic Magazine. Several later archaeologists would recall that their youthful exposure to these articles, "vividly illustrated with a color rendition of a purported virgin in filmy huipil [a type of clothing] being hurled into the Sacred Cenote", had drawn them into the field in the first place.

Morley maintained a daily diary his entire adult life detailing his discoveries, projects, and excavations. These diaries and his field notes are being published online at Mesoweb.com

Morley's The Ancient Maya was later detected to be a primary source used in several attempted forgeries of Mesoamerican conquest-era manuscripts, such as those known as Historias de la Conquista del Mayab, the "Canek Manuscript", and several others. These documents purported to be contemporary accounts written around the 17th century, which had been "discovered" in the mid-20th century. The manuscripts described various aspects of Maya culture and detailed some episodes from early Spanish colonial history; several also included illustrations of Maya glyphs. Although initially accepted by some sources as authentic, later analysis demonstrated striking similarities with the Spanish-language edition of Morley's work, and thus identifying them as modern fakes made sometime between 1950 and 1965.

== The "other" Sylvanus Griswold Morley ==
A different notable contemporaneous person shared the name Sylvanus Griswold Morley.. This second, known as S. Griswold Morley, was in fact the older maternal cousin to the first, born February 23, 1878, in Baldwinville, Worcester County, Massachusetts. He was originally baptised Sylvanus Griswold Small ("Sylvanus Griswold" being a family "heirloom" name), but changed his surname from Small to Morley in his early twenties when his father did likewise. As a result, many biographical references confuse details of the two, such as interchanging their birthplaces.

S. Griswold Morley preceded Sylvanus the archaeologist into Harvard, and he was later to establish a career as a Professor of Spanish at the University of California, Berkeley. In his autobiography, the Spanish professor noted the effect of this name change and subsequent confusion:

However, the person with the most right to complain was my cousin Sylvanus Griswold Morley, the celebrated archaeologist. The move made us homonyms, and gave rise to endless confusion. Look in a Who's Who in America and you will learn the facts. Look in a library catalog, and you will be lucky to learn anything but errors. Sylvanus, a most good-natured soul, never protested. He was an undergraduate at Harvard while I was in the Grad. School. I sometimes received his Univ. bills, and less often, billets doux from his lights of love. I think he has none of mine.

This Morley is perhaps best known to students of American culture for his early interest in old covered bridges as historical structures. His book on The Covered Bridges of California (University of California Press, 1938) remains an important reference work on the subject.

Sylvanus G. (Small) Morley died in 1970; his son Thomas published his autobiographical notes posthumously.
