= Historias de la Conquista del Mayab =

Historias de la Conquista del Mayab ("Histories of the Conquest of the Mayab") is a Mexican manuscript ostensibly written in 1725 by an otherwise unknown friar, Joseph de San Buena Ventura, who compiled it from various older sources. The manuscript is now regarded as a forgery created in the 1950s or 1960s, with information derived from a Spanish translation of Sylvanus G. Morley's 1947 book The Ancient Maya. It is written on modern paper, which cannot date from earlier than the 19th century.

Historias de la Conquista del Mayab appears to have been produced by the same forger as Las Memorias de Guerrero, the Historia de la pazificacion de las tierras de los indios itzaes y las ganzias de el tayasal y de todos los pueblos de la alaguna en el año 1697, and the Canek Manuscript, with which it bears a number of similarities.

The manuscript was acquired by the Archivo de Historia de México Condumex in Mexico City shortly after 1970.
