= Doctor Alchemy =

DC Comics supervillains

- Albert Desmond as Doctor Alchemy, as he appeared on a splash page of The Flash #764 (October 2020). Art by Will Conrad.

Publication information
- Publisher: DC Comics
- First appearance: (Desmond); Showcase #13 (April 1958) (Engstrom); The Flash (vol. 2) #71 (February 1992) (Petrov); The Flash (vol. 2) #202 (November 2003)
- Created by: (Desmond); John Broome; Carmine Infantino

In-story information
- Full name: Albert Desmond; Dr. Curtis Engstrom; Alexander Petrov
- Species: Metahuman
- Team affiliations: Desmond: Crime Champions
- Notable aliases: (Desmond and Petrov); Mister Element (Engstrom); Alchemist
- Abilities: Elemental transmutation Molecular manipulation

Doctor Alchemy is a name used by three different supervillains appearing in American comic books published by DC Comics. Albert Desmond started out as Mister Element before operating as Doctor Alchemy.

The character appeared as a recurring cast member on The CW television series third season of The Flash played by Tom Felton. The character makes his cinematic debut in the DC Extended Universe film The Flash, played by Rudy Mancuso.

== Publication history ==
The character of Albert Desmond, created by John Broome and Carmine Infantino, first appeared in Showcase #13 (April 1958) as Mister Element. His second, and more frequently used, identity of Doctor Alchemy first appeared in Showcase #14 (June 1958).

Dr. Curtis Engstrom made his first appearance as The Alchemist in The Flash (vol. 2) #71 (Feb. 1992) and was created by writer Mark Waid and artist Greg LaRocque.

The character of Alexander Petrov made his first appearance in The Flash (vol. 2) #202 (Nov. 2003) and was created by Geoff Johns and Alberto Dose.

== Fictional character biography ==
=== Albert Desmond ===
Desmond, originally Mister Element, as appeared in The Flash #216 (June 1972). Art by Dick Dillin (pencils) and Dick Giordano (inks).

Albert Desmond is a lowly chemist with dissociative identity disorder. Desmond has two distinct personalities: one major driving personality and another criminally inclined one. Under his darker personality, he applies his knowledge of chemistry to create the identity of Mister Element. He creates elemental weapons such as bulletproof silicon to shield his cars, and discovers a new element, Elemento, a magnetic light with which he sends the Flash into space.

After being sent to jail as a result of his first encounter with the Flash, he learns of the Philosopher's Stone from his cellmate. He escapes jail, finds the Philosopher's Stone, and uses its power to transmute elements to restart his criminal career as Doctor Alchemy. His good personality eventually resurfaces, causing him to quit crime and hide the Philosopher's Stone. Shortly after, a new version of Doctor Alchemy seemingly appears and is revealed to be his astral twin "Alvin" Desmond, with whom he shares a psychic link. It was later revealed that "Alvin" was a construct of the Philosopher's Stone created by Albert's criminal personality. When Albert confronts and defeats Alvin, he resumes the identity of Doctor Alchemy.

=== Curtis Engstrom ===
Curtis Engstrom is an advisor on a S.T.A.R. Labs project which involves using the Philosopher's Stone to power a medical computer. He steals the computer with the help of small-time crook Moe "Mouthpiece" Miglian, but is arrested. After escaping from prison, Engstrom dons his own Doctor Alchemy costume and sets out to retrieve the microchip that had been taken from him by Miglian, calling himself the Alchemist. After being defeated, Engstrom and Miglian are both arrested.

=== Alexander Petrov ===
Alexander Petrov is a criminologist working for the Keystone City Police Department who used an ice-based weapon created by Mister Element to commit crimes and further his career. His plan comes undone when profiler Ashley Zolomon enters his office as he is putting on his mask. Wally West stops him from killing Zolomon, but Captain Cold interrupts them before the Flash can take him into custody and kills Petrov for breaking one of the rules of the Rogues' code of "ethics" – not framing other Rogues for crimes.

== Powers and abilities ==
Doctor Alchemy possesses the Philosopher's Stone, which once belonged to Merlin. By pressing the stone at various points, he can transmute any substance into any other (e.g., steel into rubber, oxygen into carbon monoxide) and also possesses the power to transform the molecular structure of the human body, having once turned the Flash into a being of water vapor. Desmond can also control the Philosopher's Stone from a distance via an idiosyncratic connection through it.

=== Equipment ===
As Mister Element, Albert Desmond dons a suit equipped with an oxygen mask and selects the model of carbon as his suit emblem.

Mister Element wields an Element Gun that enables him to generate specific elements or compounds like high-potency acids, plasma and molten barriers, tactical shielding, atmospheric manipulation, and custom elements like "Elemento".

== In other media ==
=== Television ===
- Doctor Alchemy and Mister Element make non-speaking cameo appearances in the Justice League Unlimited episode "Flash and Substance".
- Julian Albert Desmond / Doctor Alchemy appears in the third season of The Flash (2014), portrayed by Tom Felton and voiced by Tobin Bell. This version is a British forensic scientist, Barry Allen's rival in the Central City Police Department, and a time aberration caused by the creation and erasure of the "Flashpoint" timeline. In the past, Desmond led an archeological team to locate the philosopher's stone, intending to use it to resurrect his dead sister. While Desmond finds the stone, his team was killed and he began to experience blackouts, during which Savitar forced him to work to restore the Flashpoint timeline's inhabitants. After being saved from Savitar, Desmond makes amends with Allen and works to defeat Savitar before returning to the United Kingdom.

=== Film ===
- Doctor Alchemy makes a non-speaking cameo appearance in Injustice.
- Albert Desmond appears in The Flash (2023), portrayed by Rudy Mancuso. This version is a member of the Central City Police Department and co-worker of Barry Allen and Patty Spivot. Additionally, an alternate reality variant of Desmond who became Allen and Spivot's roommate makes a minor appearance.

=== Video games ===
Doctor Alchemy appears as a character summon in Scribblenauts Unmasked: A DC Comics Adventure.

== See also ==
- Philosopher's stone
