= Murdered for Being Different =

2017 film directed by Paul Andrew Williams

- Directed by: Paul Andrew Williams
- Written by: Nick Leather
- Produced by: Scott Bassett
- Starring: Abigail Lawrie; Nico Mirallegro; Chanel Creswell
- Cinematography: Vanessa Whyte
- Edited by: Johnny Rayner
- Music by: Navid Asghari
- Production company: BBC Studios
- Distributed by: BBC Three; BBC One; British Broadcasting Corporation (BBC) Television
- Release date: 18 June 2017 (UK)
- Running time: 62 minutes
- Country: United Kingdom
- Language: English
- Budget: £600,000 (estimated)

Murdered for Being Different, is a 2017 British crime drama film directed by Paul Andrew Williams. It is based on the 2007 murder of Sophie Lancaster in the United Kingdom.

The film is about two people from the goth subculture who are assaulted by drunken youths in a skateboard park, and the subsequent police investigation. The attack itself is shown in detail. Flashbacks of the couple's loving relationship contrast with the brutal violence and the stark investigation.

Murdered for Being Different was first released on BBC3 on Sunday 18 June 2017. It won the BAFTA TV Award for Best Single Drama the following year.

== Plot ==
A young couple, Rob and Sophie, purchase alcohol at a convenience store late at night. They are friendly, despite wearing exaggerated gothic fashion and accessories. A teenage boy, named Michael, asks Sophie if he can touch her hair - black and red dreadlocks - and she agrees joyfully, joking that she will have to charge him next time. Michael invites them to the park.

In the park, there is a crowd of young people. Most of them, especially the girls, find their fashion style interesting and one girl asks to have a photo taken with them. The gothic couple and the street teenagers get along well with each other. However, less than half an hour later, Rob and Sophie are shown beaten in a bloody scene, and Sophie is knocked unconscious.

Detective Constable Farley is in charge of the investigation. She interviews Michael, who had called an ambulance to the scene, and he states that he was passing by when he happened to see the injured couple. Farley is informed that the CCTV cameras in the neighbourhood were out of service and did not capture any footage that night. Without any witnesses or evidence, the case appears to have reached a dead end. The teenagers lie about the incident, though Michael expresses sympathy and regret, and reflects on what happened to Sophie and Rob.

Rob awakens in hospital with serious injuries and no recollection of what happened. Sophie is in a coma for two weeks before her family make the difficult decision to terminate her life support. Michael learns of this and comes forward to police with his testimony, despite fearing the threats of the gang leader.

Flashbacks throughout reveal Rob and Sophie's relationship. Rob falls in love with Sophie at first sight at a pub and takes her to his secret base. As an art student, he paints wings on Sophie's back because he thinks she is an angel and regards her as his Mona Lisa. Sophie is a fan of the Harry Potter series, so Rob reads a Harry Potter book with her, enjoying their romance on a freezing hilltop.

Before this case, Rob and Sophie were once threatened because of their appearance. Traumatised by the beating and Sophie's death, Rob becomes frightened to go outside. However, by the end of the film, Rob decides to wear goth fashion and makeup again, in memory of Sophie and also standing up for their beliefs.

== Cast ==
Role	Actor
Sophie Lancaster	Abigail Lawrie
Rob Maltby	Nico Mirallegro
Danny Hulme	Lewis Brown
DC Mark Green	Dominic Carter
Sam Gorman	Amelia Clarke
Dave Maltby	Chris Coghill
DC Steph Farley	Chanel Creswell
Michelle Sturry	Mia Crossley
Natalie Morley	Kirsty Fanning
Jo Hulme	Macauley Fogarty
Alyssa Bean	Jodi Grensinger
Danny Mallett	Callum Harrison
Michael Gorman	Reiss Jarvis
Gang Member	Evan Jones
Christine Herbert	Lolly Jones
Paramedic	David Keeling
Tracey Maltby	Sally Lindsay
Mandy Gorman	Sophie McShera
DI Dean Holden	Jason Milligan
Ryan 'Peanut' Herbert	Connor Mullen
Gang Member	Coral Mulligan
Steven Thorner	Gino Nicholson
Doctor Woodyatt	Gary Oliver
Gang Member	Connor Pilkington
Sean Mcdonagh	Jack Smith
Gang Member	Leigha Unsworth
Brendan Harris	Ezra Watson

== Production ==
=== Development ===
The story is based on the murder of Sophie Lancaster in Lancashire in 2007. BBC channel controller Damian Kavanagh noted that the network sought true stories through which the audience could "understand themselves and their place in the world". Executive producer Aysha Rafaele noted the "impact" of having a "true story". Marco Crivellari was tasked with dramatizing the real events. The only fictionalised element in the film is Michael Gorman, the witness to the attack who is threatened by the gang but ultimately brave enough to come forward. The character is a composite of different people, partly to protect individuals who live in Bacup, but also as a young character which can embody the possibility of hope. "We want there to be a rallying cry," Rafaele stated. "You don't have to be part of the mob. You can stand up and make your voice heard and make a difference."

The production was supported by the victim's relatives. During consultations, they showed sorrow and struggled to continue. Sophie's mother said: "It's brutal. I had to watch it to make sure it did justice to Sophie. It was very, very difficult. I don't think I've cried as much in 10 years. It absolutely broke my heart. It's very graphic, but I don't think it's gratuitous. We have to get that message out there that this is unacceptable behaviour." Rob, on the other hand, said he thought he "finally got something positive come out of something so utterly negative".

=== Casting ===
Abigail Lawrie, who plays Sophie, received the endorsement of Sophie's mother. "I felt she was very, very good," she said. "There is one scene where she's sat on the couch and Rob comes in with a Harry Potter book. That took my breath away because that was Sophie. That looked like her, it felt like her."

=== Post-production ===
London's Will Coker graded the show using the Nucoda Film Master. Generally, he kept it natural with certain scenes enhanced, such as building an uneasy, nervous hospital atmosphere by greens, yellows, and sickly skin tones. The audio was mixed on a D-Control surface led by senior sound mixer Karl Mainzer.

== Release ==
Murdered for Being Different was released on the tenth anniversary of the murder. On Sunday 18 June 2017, it was first released on BBC3.

On 13 July 2017, it was broadcast on BBC1 at 22:45 and at 23:10 in Northern Ireland.

== Critical response ==
When Murdered for Being Different was released, the majority of the audience gave it positive reviews. Julia Raeside from The Guardian called it "a gut-wrenching dramatisation ... with a truly powerful message". She found every shot to be composed beautifully and praised the direction and editing for contrasting the stark investigation and brutal violence with the romanticised flashbacks of Sophie and Rob's relationship.

Jasper Rees from The Arts Desk wrote that the film was "not to be missed". He praised the performances of Sophie, Mirallegro and Jarvis. He also found it a fair point for Rob to pluck up the courage to be different in the end by dressing in gothic.

Caroline Preece of Den of Geek praised director Paul Andrew Williams for showing the couple's relationship in a fantastical, romanticised way. She also felt that the script cleverly "humanises" Sophie by having her finish the Harry Potter novels and step into adulthood.

Gerard O'Donovan from The Daily Telegraph questioned the graphic depiction of violence when the events are already well known, finding it "unnecessary at best, and voyeuristic at worst". However, he appreciated that it was shown Michael's perspective, and through the fictional character examined social responsibility and morality weighed against gang mentality. Overall, he found it "a worthwhile, thought-provoking piece".

== Accolades ==
Murdered for Being Different won the BAFTA television award for best single drama in 2018.
