= Tin Star (TV series) =

Television series, 2017–2020

- Genre: Crime drama
- Created by: Rowan Joffé
- Starring: Tim Roth; Christina Hendricks; Genevieve O'Reilly; Abigail Lawrie; Oliver Coopersmith; Ian Puleston-Davies; Sarah Podemski; Ryan Kennedy; Lynda Boyd; Michelle Thrush; John Lynch; Anamaria Marinca; Jenessa Grant; Nigel Bennett; Ian Hart
- Composer: Adrian Corker
- Country of origin: United Kingdom
- Original language: English
- No. of series: 3
- No. of episodes: 25

Production
- Executive producers: Rowan Joffé; Alison Jackson; Diederick Santer; Cameron Roach; Paul Gilbert
- Producers: Jonathan Curling; Liz Trubridge; Angus Lamont; Andy Morgan
- Cinematography: Dale McCready; Paul Sarossy
- Editors: Amy Hounsell; Mark Eckersley; Oral Norrie Ottey; Paulo Pandolpho; Ben Drury
- Running time: 43–67 minutes
- Production company: Kudos

Original release
- Network: Sky Atlantic
- Release: 7 September 2017 – 24 December 2020

Tin Star is a British crime drama television series created by Rowan Joffé. The series focuses on Jim Worth, a former Liverpool Metropolitan Police Service detective who becomes chief of police of a Canadian town in the Rocky Mountains. It stars Tim Roth, Genevieve O'Reilly, Abigail Lawrie, Oliver Coopersmith, Ian Hart and Christina Hendricks.

The series premiered on Sky Atlantic on 7 September 2017, and became available on Amazon Video internationally on 29 September. Series 2 premiered on 24 January 2019. Production for the third and final series, which takes place in Liverpool, England, commenced in 2019. It was released in December 2020.

== Synopsis ==
Former Liverpool undercover police detective Jim Worth is the seemingly gentle police chief of Little Big Bear, a small town at the edge of the Canadian Rockies, where he has settled his family of four. But, thanks to a chief of security for North Stream Oil, the oil company that dominates the town, people from Worth's violent past catch up with him. He and his wife Angela prompt Jim's alcoholic and violent former identity Jack Devlin to resurface, enabling him to eliminate anyone they suspect of trying to hurt their family. The local head of public relations for North Stream, Elizabeth Bradshaw, wavers between ethics and criminality against a backdrop of rough oil workers and bikers. The family eventually return to Liverpool to confront those who want to see him and his family destroyed.

== Cast and characters ==
- Tim Roth as James "Jim" Worth, a former Metropolitan Police detective and the new Chief of Little Big Bear Police, and as Jack Devlin, Worth's violent alter-ego, which he slips into when under the influence of alcohol.
- Christina Hendricks as Elizabeth Bradshaw (series 1–2), Vice President of Stakeholder Relations for North Stream Oil. Bradshaw has the job of trying to maintain a peaceful working relationship with North Stream and the local populace. This is made difficult by her dispute with Chief Worth. She often finds herself on morally ambiguous ground.
- Genevieve O'Reilly as Angela Worth, Jim's wife.
- Abigail Lawrie as Anna Worth, Angela's daughter.
- Oliver Coopersmith as Simon "Whitey" Brown (series 1—2), Frank's nephew with a past connection to Worth.
- Ian Puleston-Davies as Frank Keane, a criminal figure from Jim's past; uncle of Whitey.
- Sarah Podemski as Constable, later Chief Denise Minahik, a First Nations officer with Little Big Bear Police, and second-in-command to Chief Worth. Also in a somewhat secret relationship with Constable McGillen. Her estranged father is a Chief in the local First Nations tribe.
- Ryan Kennedy as Constable Nick McGillen, a junior officer with Little Big Bear Police, in a somewhat secret relationship with Constable Minahik.
- Lynda Boyd as Randy, the owner of Randy's Roadhouse, a bar and later strip club; partner of Frank Keane.
- Michelle Thrush as Jaclyn Letendre (series 1–2), a member of the Ipowahtaman tribe who relocates to the Musqwa reserve.
- John Lynch as Pastor Johan Nickel (series 2), a Mexican Canadian Ammonite preacher.
- Anamaria Marinca as Sarah Nickel (series 2), the community dentist and wife of Pastor Johan.
- Jenessa Grant as Rosa Nickel (series 2), daughter of Pastor Johan.
- Nigel Bennett as Friedrich Quiring (series 2), leader of the Ammonite community.
- Christopher Heyerdahl as Louis Gagnon (series 1), North Stream Oil's enigmatic head of security.
- Stephen Walters as Johnny (series 1), a career criminal from Blackpool, England working closely with Frank.
- Rupert Turnbull as Peter Worth (series 1), Jim and Angela's five-year-old son, who is shot dead in a botched assassination attempt.
- Ray G. Thunderchild as Jacob Minahik (series 1), chief of the Musqwa tribe and Denise's estranged father.
- Roark Critchlow as Detective Inspector Benoit Lehane (series 1), Royal Canadian Federal Police.
- Kevin Hanchard as Father Gregoire (series 1), Jim's Alcoholics Anonymous sponsor.
- Tobi Bamtefa as Reginald Godswill (series 1), a criminal enforcer working with Whitey, Frank and Johnny.
- Jack Veal as Young Simon (series 1), seen in flashbacks to 2007.
- Gerald Auger as Timothy Whiteknife (series 1), a member of the Musqwa First Nations.
- Joseph Whitebird as Ray Laskamin (series 1), a member of the Musqwa First Nations.
- Owen Crowshoe as Hal Laskamin (series 1), a member of the Musqwa First Nations.
- Lorne Cardinal as Chief Lightfoot (series 1), head of the Reverie Ipowahtaman Tribal Police.
- Nicholas Campbell as Wallace Lyle (series 1)
- Maxwell McCabe-Lokos as Daniel Lyle (series 1)
- Rachael Crawford as Dr. Susan Bouchard (series 1)
- Tanya Moodie as Catherine Mckenzie (series 3)
- Kerrie Hayes as DI Sara Lunt, whom Jack mockingly calls "rhymes with" (series 3)
- Ian Hart as Michael Ryan (series 3)
- Joanne Whalley as Mary James (series 3)

== Episodes ==
Series	Episodes	Originally released	
Series	Episodes	First released	Last released
1	10	7 September 2017	10 November 2017
2	9	24 January 2019	21 March 2019
3	6	10 December 2020	24 December 2020

=== Series 1 (2017) ===
- Aired weekly on Sky Atlantic; the entire series was also available to download via Sky Box Sets and Now TV on 7 September 2017.

No.	Title	Directed by	Written by	Original release date
1	"Fun and (S)Laughter"	Rowan Joffé	Rowan Joffé	7 September 2017
While Little Big Bear, sheriff Jim Worth, his partner Angela, daughter Anna and son Peter are on a road trip to Calgary. They are ambushed by a man wearing a white mask who shoots at Jim, but he ducks, and the bullet kills Peter with a ricochet wounding Angela. This event shatters the family's peaceful life. It also impacts on Jim's ability to investigate recent deaths of local Ipowahtaman women with the assistance of diligent Constable Denise Minahik. He encounters Louis Gagnon, head of security for North Stream Oil who is looking to expand their operations and Elizabeth Bradshaw, the company's conscientious public relations officer. Jim becomes increasingly interested in the operations of the oil company after Dr. Susan Bouchard, a vocal opponent of their operation is found murdered.
2	"The Kid"	Marc Jobst	Rowan Joffé	14 September 2017
With Peter dead and Angela in a coma, Jim and Anna both are devastated by the incident. Following the botched assassination attempt by the young killer, Whitey, men from Jim's past in Britain, Frank Keane, Reginald, Johnny and Whitey, start working at the oil company as a cover to complete their mission. Meanwhile, Jim and Constable Minahik begin digging into Dr. Bouchard’s death.
3	"Comfort of Strangers"	Alice Troughton	Rowan Joffé	21 September 2017
Affected by the impact on his family and wracked by guilt, Jim spends a night out on drink and drugs and has a fling with Jaclyn, a local woman. Also distraught, Anna has gone off alone and is picked up by Whitey whom she recognizes from a bar in town. Earlier Whitey had killed Johnny with a rock because he was losing he nerve. He now planned to kill Anna, but became attracted to her instead. Meanwhile, Jim finds them together and recognizes Whitey.
4	"Jack"	Marc Jobst	Rowan Joffé	28 September 2017
Angela recovers consciousness, but Jim’s behavior and their guilt over Peter's death creates tension within the Worth family. Jaclyn reveals that she witnessed the murder of Dr. Susan Bouchard but refuses to come forward realizing the risk to her own life if she talks. Whitey hatches a plan to ambush and kill Jim by hijacking a truck. At a press conference over Peter's death, Jim accuses the oil company of complicity. This causes Elizabeth a moral dilemma and she decides to provide journalist Dermot O'Hanrahan with sordid details of Jim's past. Frustrated with Jim's increasing erratic behavior, Angela locks him out of the house.
5	"Bait"	Alice Troughton	Tom Butterworth, Chris Hurford & Rowan Joffé	5 October 2017
Whitey enacts his plan to ambush Jim, but Constables Denise Minahik and Nick McGillen attend the call and Minahik is shot. In another plot to kill Jim, Whitey has Reginald, one of Frank's team, pick up Jim in a bar, telling him that Angela is in trouble and offers to take him to her. However, Jim turns the tables, causing the car to crash, throwing Reginald through the window. Reginald calls him Jack Devlin before he dies. When Whitey arrives to find the car ablaze with Reginald inside he swears revenge on Worth.
6	"Cuckoo"	Grant Harvey	Rowan Joffé	12 October 2017
Whitey enters the Worth home looking for Jim, but Angela gets the drop on him, however Anna defends him, saying that he saved her. Jack begins behaving less like a sheriff and more like a vigilante, confusing the supportive Constable Minahik. Jim arrives home to find Whitey with Angela and Anna which makes him extremely uncomfortable. Angela mistrusts Jim, but she still needs him to find Peter’s killer. Meanwhile, Frank tries to cut his ties with Whitey, and we see a family photo on his wall with Jack, an unknown woman and a boy.
7	"Exposure"	Gilles Bannier	Tom Butterworth, Chris Hurford & Rowan Joffé	19 October 2017
Anna is distressed when she finds her father in a room above Randy's bar with two semi-naked women. Meanwhile, Elizabeth digs into allegations of dirty dealing by North Stream Oil in the town of Reverie and finds indications of corruption. More about Jim Worth's former life as Jack Devlin is revealed. While Jim and Angela discuss ways of finding Peter's killer, Whitey and Anna have sex, the first time for both of them.
8	"This be the Verse"	Grant Harvey	Tom Butterworth, Chris Hurford & Rowan Joffé	26 October 2017
Jack begins to make sense of reason shooters are targeting him and his family. When Gagnon realizes that Elizabeth is digging up dirt on North Stream Oil, he threatens both her, and her family back in Toronto. Elizabeth and Jaclyn arrive at the Worth house fleeing Gagnon for fear of their lives. Gagnon arrives at the house, cuts the power and hunts the women. He disarms Angela, but is then wounded by Jaclyn. He attacks her, but is stabbed in the back by Elizabeth and then fatally shot by Angela.
9	"Fortunate Boy"	Craig Viveiros	Rowan Joffé	3 November 2017
In a flashback to ten years earlier, we see the undercover cop, Jack Devlin with a boy Simon and his mother Helen, the group in Frank's family photo. Helen is Frank's half-sister, and is married to the criminal Malcolm, Simon's father. Jack is in the grips of alcohol addiction and also lives part-time with Angela and Anna in the city. Malcom arrives home and savagely beats Jack, then discusses what to do with him with Frank. Simon helps Jack escape and he promises to return, but never does. Whitey reveals all of this to Anna who is conflicted by her attraction to who also killed her brother.
10	"My Love is Vengeance"	Gilles Bannier	Rowan Joffé	10 November 2017
Angela destroys the evidence of Gagnon's bloody murder from Constable Minahik by blowing up her house. Meanwhile, Jim violently interrogates Frank and his lover Randy, eventually finding out that Simon, now known as Whitey, killed Peter. At North Stream Oil headquarters, Elizabeth presents her evidence of the company’s shady operations and bargains herself into a senior position. At Little Big Bear, first Angela and then Jack track Anna and Whitey to the cabin where they are hiding. Although Jack/Jim still has affection for Whitey, he kills him in revenge for Peter's death. Anna then points a gun at her father and fires.

=== Series 2 (2019) ===
- Aired weekly on Sky Atlantic; the entire series was also available to download via Sky Box Sets and Now TV on 24 January 2019. Amazon Prime released the whole season two in the US on 7 March 2019 but they have yet to reveal a date for release in the UK. A DVD & Blu-Ray release is due on 15 April 2019 and is currently available to pre-order. Amazon's episode guide lists an extra episode in addition to the original 9 episodes released by Sky Atlantic. The reason for this is that the original season premiere "Prairie Gothic" was a special feature length episode that ran for 1 hour 20 minutes. Amazon split this episode into two parts of just under 45 minutes, the first part retaining the title and number of the original episode and the second part becoming a new episode titled "Something Wicked This Way Comes" and numbered as episode two. The remaining episodes were numbered 3-10 which means that they don't match the original episode numbers.

This episode list reflects the original Sky Atlantic episode list.

No.	Title	Directed by	Written by	Original release date
1	"Prairie Gothic"	Gilles Bannier	Rowan Joffé	24 January 2019
Following directly on from the events of My Love is Vengeance, Jack lies bleeding on the mountainside, having been shot by Anna. Terrified by her own actions, a confused Anna flees, pursued by Angela, who leaves Jack to die. Anna reaches an Ammonite community on the border of Little Big Bear, where she tries to commit suicide but is saved from death by teenager Rosa Nickel, daughter of the local pastor. Meanwhile, Jack awakens from a period of unconsciousness and manages to make his way into the forest, where he sets fire to Whitey's cabin to signal for help.
2	"Resist Not Evil"	Chris Baugh	Rowan Joffé	31 January 2019
Anna begins to integrate with the Ammonite community, being baptised by Father Johan in a desperate attempt to leave her former life behind. Elizabeth and Angela continue to hide out at her company mansion, which has now been cut off from the grid. Father Johan struggles to conceal a shipment of cocaine that he has smuggled across the border from Mexico for a cartel of dangerous criminals. A deranged Jack continues to cause misery amongst the Ammonite community with his tirade of abuse, climaxing with him driving his police truck through the community church in the middle of a service.
3	"Consequences (Elizabeth and Johan's Story)"	Jim Loach	Rowan Joffé	7 February 2019
Johan panics when the cartel come calling for the drugs, but they are nowhere to be found. Jaclyn manages to track down Elizabeth and Angela and demands $100,000 in return for her silence. As Elizabeth tries to raise the required funds, she finds herself unwittingly caught in the middle of the feud between Jack and Frank.
4	"Jack and Coke (Jack and Angela's Story)"	Jim Loach	Thomas Martin	14 February 2019
As the same day plays out from the perspective of Jack and Angela, Angela approaches Jack for help in an attempt to help a desperate Elizabeth. Jack concocts an elaborate plan to mix Johan's drugs with baby powder in order to double the quantity, but when Frank refuses his offer of a deal, he decides to rob Randy's Roadhouse, unaware that an illegal poker game involving several wealthy townsfolk is taking place in the backroom.
5	"The Bagman Cometh"	Chris Baugh	Rowan Joffé	21 February 2019
Anna pleads with Jack to help Johan out of his predicament. Jack offers to help on the understanding that Johan opens up to his family about his secret life. Sarah questions Johan's motives for smuggling cocaine, to which he reveals that he was forced into a life of crime after the cartel murdered his brother as repayment for an unpaid loan taken against diesel supplies for a harvest crop which failed, leaving the family penniless and unable to pay back what they owe.
6	"Age Of Anxiety"	Susan Tully	Rowan Joffé	28 February 2019
Jack comes face to face with the cartel's bagman, who after fearing retribution from his superiors, decides to take his own life - but not before telling Jack that 'Liverpool' is coming for him. Denise interrogates Elizabeth over the disappearance of Jaclyn, prompting an unexpected accusation of murder towards Jack and Angela.
7	"Subterranean Fire"	Susan Tully	Rowan Joffé	7 March 2019
Jack negotiates the safe return of the drugs, allowing Johan to meet with the cartel to give them what they are rightfully owed. Sarah organises for Rosa to leave the colony to spend time with her cousin in Nelson. Jack, continually haunted over Whitey's death, decides to extract the truth from Frank once and for all.
8	"Wild Flower"	Justin Chadwick	Nathaniel Price	14 March 2019
As Jack, Angela and Anna prepare to flee to England on false passports, they come across Rosa's lifeless body on the roadside after she had been shot. After returning Rosa to her family, Jack receives an unexpected delivery containing photographs of his loved ones indicating a threat to their lives. With the cartel and Jack's former associates from Liverpool apparently seeking revenge, the Ammonite community, Jack, Angela and Anna arm themselves and prepare for an attack on the village.
9	"The Unseen"	Justin Chadwick	Rowan Joffé & Nathaniel Price	21 March 2019
Two dark vehicles approach the village, while Jack, Angela and Anna prepare to defend themselves and the community. They agree to meet in a pub in Liverpool should they survive. Soon, heavily armed men enter the village the shooting begins. Some members of the community including Johan and his wife Sarah are killed. None of the attackers survive while Jack, Angela and Anna become separated during the shoot-out and lose contact with each other.

=== Series 3 (2020) ===
Titled "Tin Star: Liverpool", the action moved to Liverpool.

- Aired two episodes per week on Sky Atlantic.

No.	Title	Directed by	Written by	Original release date
1	"Homecoming"	Justin Chadwick	Rowan Joffé	10 December 2020
Jack returns to Liverpool and waits for days in the pub where he, Angela and Anna agreed to meet. Eventually they are reunited and Angela and Anna agree to follow Jack's plan of killing the people on his list of former associates. They buy guns from an illegal arm dealer, Mary James who also runs a shelter for homeless youth. Anna learns that Danny Ryan, brother of Michael Ryan was her real father but when Michael ordered him to kill Angela he was killed by Jack. It's not long before two of the people on the list, Chief Constable, Catherine McKenzie and now property developer, Michael Ryan, are involved in a shoot-out with the trio. Later, Catherine McKenzie interviews Jack in her office in the presence of D.I. Sara Lunt whose interest is piqued by the obvious strong animosity between them. With the element of surprise gone, a cat and mouse game begins between the trio and their adversaries.
2	"Commitment"	Patrick Harkins	Vanessa Alexander	10 December 2020
At the Stork Hotel, Angela interrogates the owner, Sean McGrath, about the death of her brother Callum and he admits that he killed Callum on Michael Ryan's orders. She locks him in the freezer to die, with Jack's list in his mouth. D.I. Lunt decides to carry out her own investigation of Jack, but he discovers her following him and he warns her to be careful. Jack, Angela and Anna go out for a night on the town while Ryan secretly visits their hotel. In the morning, Jack pressures Kevin Wilson, a priest who is on his list, to marry him to Angela before shooting him dead. When they return to the hotel, they find an envelope from Ryan addressed to Angela containing a photo of the burnt body of Callum and other photos showing that they are being watched.
3	"Loves Young Dream"	Stewart Svaasand	Alexander Stewart	17 December 2020
Jack follows a young drug dealer, Kayden Ferguson, to a construction site in an effort to track down Georgie Simmons who is on his list. McKenzie directs D. I. Lunt to arrest Mary James for dealing in firearms, but while in custody, McKenzie is unable to get any information on Jack's plans from her. Ann has a date with Jesse, the bartender she met on the trio's night out, but she is followed. Angela goes to Haydock racetrack planning to kill the Joe Clarke, a border force officer and money launderer who is another person on Jack's list. Meanwhile, Jack allows Georgie to capture him, but after taking a beating, he surprises Simmons and breaks her neck, killing her before she can shoot him and Ferguson. Anna goes back to Jesse's place where she discovers that he is Catherine McKenzie's son. At the racetrack, Ryan gets to Clarke first and slits his throat and then stalks Angela, who has a gun put to her head.
4	"Collateral"	Stewart Svaasand	Rob Fraser	17 December 2020
It is Jack who pulled the gun on Angela and as they prepare to leave the racecourse, one of Ryan's men goes to shoot Jack. However, Ryan kills his man instead - he does not want a quick death for Jack. Ann is still at the McKenzie house with Jesse and resolves to kill Catherine McKenzie when she comes home. Her husband arrives home first and Anna accidentally shoots him dead. She and Jesse fight, but Jack and Angela arrive and take control, also capturing a nosey neighbour. Lunt questions Mary James about Jack and McKenzie and concludes that Jack may be telling the truth. Jesse attempts to attack Jack, but Angela shoots him dead. Jack suggests that Angela and Anna leave and he waits for McKenzie, but Lunt arrives first and she agrees to let Jack leave. Catherine McKenzie enters the house and finds her son and husband dead. Concluding that Lunt let Jack go, McKenzie shoots both her and the unsuspecting neighbour dead.
5	"All Roads"	Paulette Randall	Nathaniel Price	24 December 2020
Jack enlists Mary's help in finding the hotel where McKenzie is being held for protection. Anna is attacked by Sean's cousins but manages to escape. Ryan tracks down Angela and offers her an escape from Jack which she refuses. Jack visits Helen in a nursing home where she spends her time in an apparently vegetative state. She tearfully recognizes him, but then he smothers her with a pillow. It is revealed through conversations that while undercover, Jack discovered that Michael and Danny Ryan were trafficking in people as well as drugs and that they killed a load of men, women and children to protect a drug shipment - McKenzie was Jack's handler but was in league with Michael. Fearing for her life, McKenzie pushes her police bodyguard over a balcony to his death then asks Ryan for help to kill the Worths. She heads out alone, and when being pursued by Jack, she discovers that Ryan has abandoned her. She is soon killed by Jack.
6	"Come to the Edge"	Alice Troughton	Rowan Joffé	24 December 2020
Jack leaves McKenzie's body at Ryan's proposed development site and paints on the ground, "DIG HERE". Jack and Angela have a marriage ceremony on the Liverpool pier, but Ryan appears at the shore and switches on the amusement park. The trio of Jack, Angela and Anna go to confront him and instead find a group of armed people dressed as Ryan wearing masks of his face. Ryan catches Anna and offers not to follow Jack and Angela if they leave Liverpool. Meanwhile, D.I. Vine has the building site excavated and finds an old shipping container full of decomposed corpses. He goes alone to confront Ryan in the graveyard but Ryan kills him with his bare hands. Jack arranges for Mary to take Anna to safety but Ryan intercepts them and kills Mary instead of Anna when she swerves the car and takes the bullet instead. The trio allow themselves to be taken to Ryan who threatens to kill two of them, but they are not intimidated. Jack turns the tables on Ryan and they leave him alone with a gun just as the police arrive and a shot is heard. Later, the trio are seen on the roof from which Jack threw Danny Ryan to his death, and together they run towards the edge and leap.

== Production ==
Filming took place in Alberta from June to December 2016, with scenes mainly shot in the town of High River, Alberta, located just south of Calgary.

Some of the towns in Alberta include Waterton and Dorothy.
