= Ann Axtell Morris =

American archaeologist, artist, and author

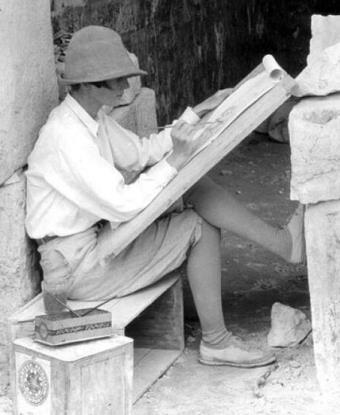
Ann Axtell Morris painting at an archaeological site, circa 1930.

Ann Axtell Morris (1900–1945) was an American archaeologist, artist, and author who largely worked in the U.S. southwest and Mexico.

== Career ==
Morris and her husband, Earl Morris, were known to actively conduct archaeological fieldwork together in both the U.S. and Mexico. Some of Ann’s most notable early work was at Chichen Itza, Yucatan, where she and her husband conducted multiple years of excavation.

Along with her husband and other archaeologists, Ann traveled throughout the southwest United States and Mexico with support from the Carnegie Institution to conduct fieldwork in the 1920s and 1930s. She was an important contributor to the task of documenting and reconstructing the Temple of the Warriors in Chichen Itza.

Ann also wrote two books: Digging in Yucatan: Archaeological Explorations in 1924 (1931) and Digging in the Southwest (1933). Her drawings and watercolor paintings documented a number of significant archaeological sites, including Canyon de Chelly and Mesa Verde.

== Personal life ==
Ann Axtell was born in Omaha, Nebraska, on February 9, 1900. She graduated from Smith College, after which she met archaeologist Earl Morris. The two were married in 1923, and they had two daughters, Elizabeth Ann and Sarah Lane. Elizabeth later went on to get a degree in anthropology from the University of Arizona.

Ann suffered from diabetes and arthritis and x-rays revealed painful spinal tumours. Towards the end of her life she developed alcoholism and depression. These conditions led to her early death at 45.

== In media ==
As Deep as the Grave, previously named Canyon of the Dead, is an upcoming biographical drama film about Morris and her husband, starring Abigail Lawrie and Tom Felton.

== Publications ==
- Digging in Yucatan (1931)
- Digging in the Southwest (1933)
