= Abigail Lawrie =

Scottish actress (born 1997)

- Born: 1997 (age 28–29); Aberdeen, Scotland
- Years active: 2014–present

Abigail Lawrie (born 1997) is a Scottish actress. She won a Scottish BAFTA for her performance in the Sky Atlantic crime drama Tin Star (2017–2020). Lawrie made her screen debut in the BBC miniseries The Casual Vacancy (2015).

== Early life and work ==
Lawrie was born and raised in Aberdeen, where she attended a local drama club as a child. At the age of 14 she moved with her family to London. While in secondary school she performed in plays including a two-week stint at the Edinburgh Festival Fringe.

== Career ==
In 2014, Lawrie was cast as Krystal Weedon, a troubled teenager, in the three-part BBC adaptation of The Casual Vacancy. In the same year Lawrie also appeared on stage in London at the Orange Tree Theatre, where she performed in When We Were Women. In 2017 she portrayed Sophie Lancaster in the TV movie Murdered for Being Different, which is based on the murder of Sophie Lancaster. Lawrie starred in three series of Tin Star in which she played Anna, a member of the Worth family, who are running from their dark past. In 2019, Lawrie played Finnoula in Our Ladies based on the Alan Warner novel The Sopranos.

In 2023 she played the role of Lana in No Escape, and Elspeth in Good Omens.

== Filmography ==
=== Film ===
Key
†	Denotes films that have not yet been released

Year	Title	Role	Notes
2016	Crumble	Lindsey	Short film
2017	The Man with the Iron Heart	Libena Fafek	
2017	Chocolate Pieces	Sara	Short film
2019	Our Ladies	Finnoula	
2020	She	She / Her	Short film
2023	Bal Maiden	Ruth	Short film
TBA	As Deep as the Grave †	Ann Axtell Morris	Post-production

=== Television ===
Year	Title	Role	Notes
2015	The Casual Vacancy	Krystal Weedon	Miniseries
2017	Murdered for Being Different	Sophie Lancaster	Television film
2017–2020	Tin Star	Anna Worth	26 episodes
2022	Strike	Margot Bamborough	3 episodes
2023	No Escape	Lana	7 episodes
2023	Good Omens	Elspeth	1 episode
2025	Coldwater	Moira-Jane	5 episodes
2026	Number 10 †		Upcoming series

== Stage ==
- 2015: When We Were Women (Orange Tree Theatre)
- 2017: This Beautiful Future (The Yard Theatre)

== Awards and nominations ==
Year	Award	Category	Work	Result	Ref.
2021	British Academy Scotland Awards	Best Actress – Television	Tin Star	Won	

2024	The British Short Film Awards	Best Actress	Bal Maiden	Nominated
