= Earl H. Morris =

American archeologist (1889–1956)

Earl Halstead Morris (October 24, 1889 – June 24, 1956), known as Earl Morris or Earl H. Morris, was an American archeologist known for his contributions to Southwest archaeology. Morris was buried in Aztec, New Mexico.

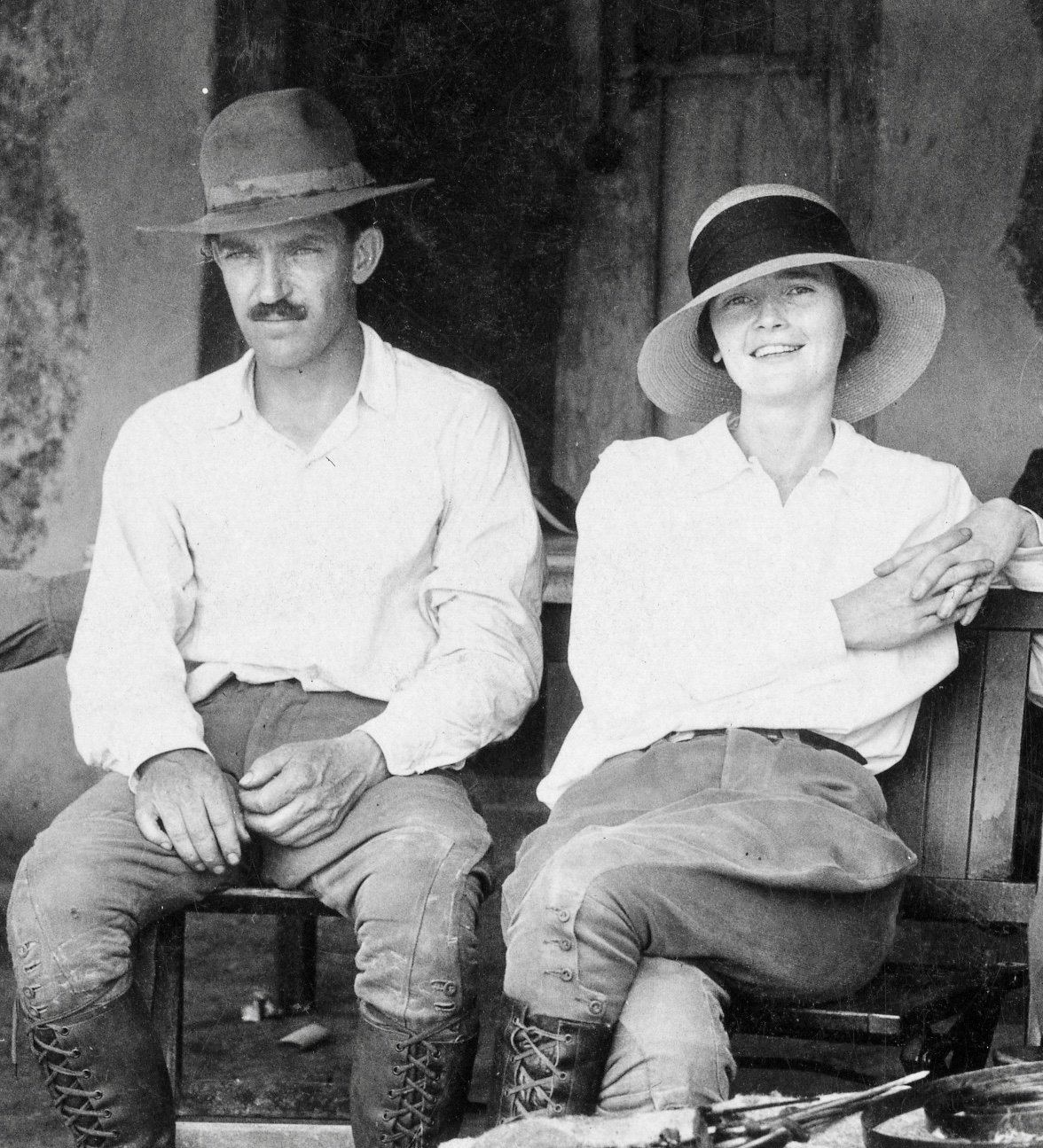
Earl and Ann Axtell Morris in Chichen Itza, 1924

== Early life and family ==
Born in 1889 in Chama, New Mexico Territory, Earl Morris was the only child of Juliette Amanda Halstead and Scott Neering Morris. What would become Earl's lifelong interest in Native American material culture began with his father, who was a collector of Native American antiquities and pothunter. Earl married fellow archaeologist Ann Axtell in 1923 and they had two daughters, Elizabeth Ann and Sarah Lane. Elizabeth later went on to get a degree in anthropology from the University of Arizona. After a lingering illness, Ann died in 1945. In 1947, he married Lucile Bowman.

== Education ==
Morris received formal education from the University of Colorado Boulder where he received his B.A. in Psychology in 1914 and his Master's in 1916. In 1917, attended Columbia University but had to leave prior to receiving his doctorate. He also earned several honors. In 1931 the University of Colorado awarded him the Norlin Medal, and then in 1942 he received an honorary Doctor of Science degree. In 1953, Morris was awarded the Alfred Vincent Kidder Award for excellence in the fields of Southwestern and Mesoamerican archaeology.

== Archaeological fieldwork and publications ==
Aside from the influence of his father, Morris's archaeological activity began in earnest after meeting Edgar L. Hewett on a train in 1912. Later that year, he began his first field excavation in the La Plata district of Southwestern Colorado. In 1912 he also worked at Quirigua, Guatemala, where he returned for additional work in 1914. After his studies, Morris returned to Aztec Ruins in 1917 as a representative of the American Museum of Natural History to explore the historic pueblo. In 1924, Morris worked for the Carnegie Institution of Washington and spent the next five years excavating at Chichen Itza, Yucatán.

Morris's first wife Ann Axtell Morris was critical to his research. She traveled in tandem with him and other notable figures in archaeology throughout the Southwest United States and Mexico with support from the Carnegie Institution to conduct fieldwork in the 1920s and 1930s. Among the many projects she was a part of, Ann was an important addition to the task of documenting and reconstructing the Temple of the Warriors in Chichen Itza.

Earl Morris led a number of excavations in the field from 1916 to 1940 for the University of Colorado Boulder (CU), the American Museum of Natural History, the Carnegie Institution of Washington, and the School of American Archaeology (SAA). These archaeological investigations led to the 69 publications from 1911 to 1956 and to extensive new collections of pottery, stone implements, baskets, sandals, and other artifacts for the institutions that supported his work. As a prominent member of the archaeological community, Morris corresponded and collaborated with influential archaeologists, anthropologists, and other scientists of the era, including Nels Nelson, A. V. Kidder, Jesse Nusbaum, Walter Fewkes, Edgar Hewett, Clark Wissler, A. E. Douglass, Junius Henderson, and Sylvanus G. Morley.

== Legacy ==
The contributions of Earl Morris to the field of North American archaeology includes vast collections of museum artifacts and archives of personal and professional notes, correspondence, and other manuscripts. These materials are currently housed at several institutions, but a large portion of them are at the University of Colorado Museum of Natural History (CUMNH) and the American Museum of Natural History (AMNH). The CUMNH also houses the Earl H. Morris Archive, containing unpublished documents and photographs from his fieldwork and research. Although some writers have suggested that Morris partially inspired the fictional archaeologist Indiana Jones, George Lucas, who developed the popular Indiana Jones film series, has stated that the character was based on a type of 1930s adventure hero rather than any specific individual.
