= Mayan cities =

Centres of ancient Maya civilization in Mesoamerica

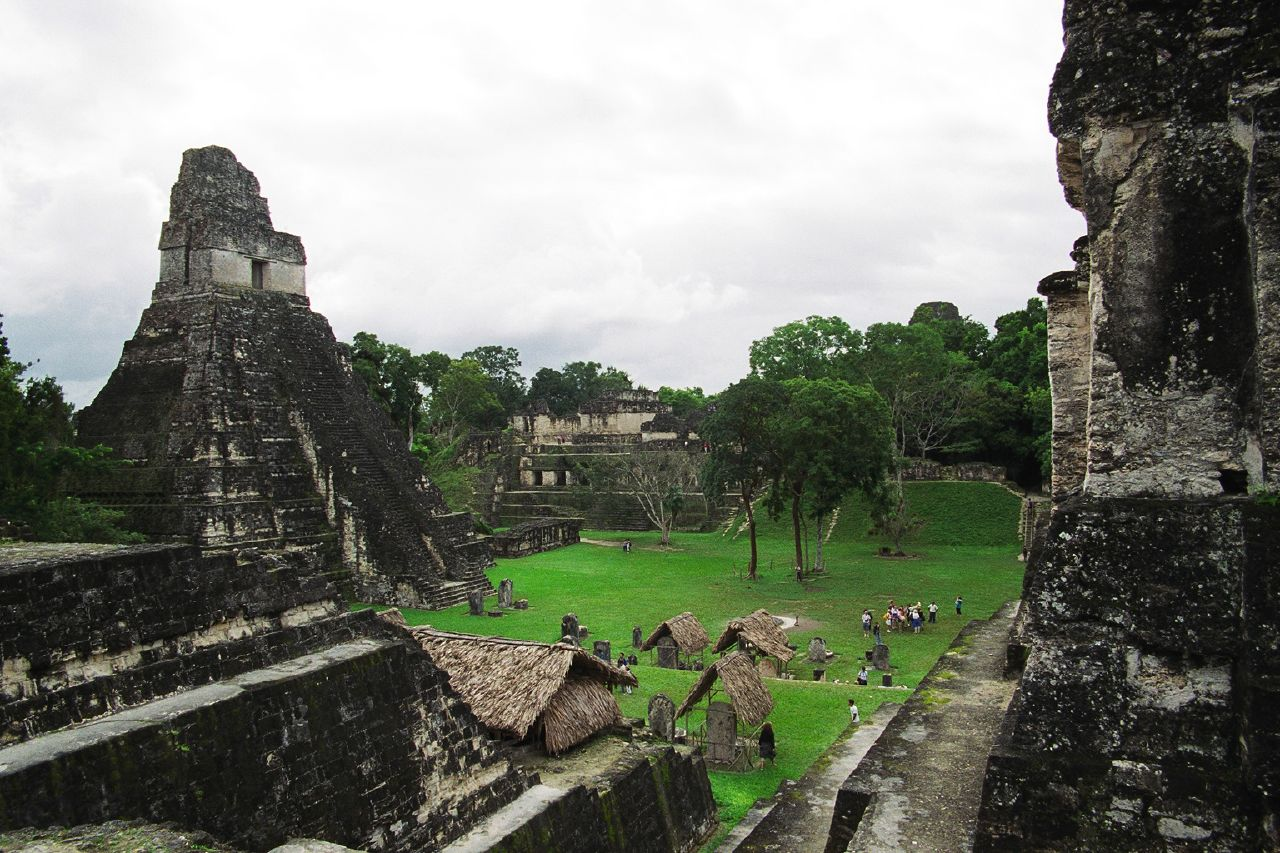
The heart of Tikal, one of the most powerful Classic Period Maya cities

Maya cities were the centres of population of the pre-Columbian Maya civilization of Mesoamerica. They served the specialised roles of administration, commerce, manufacturing and religion that characterised ancient cities worldwide. Maya cities tended to be more dispersed than cities in other societies, even within Mesoamerica, as a result of adaptation to a lowland tropical environment that allowed food production amidst areas dedicated to other activities. They lacked the grid plans of the highland cities of central Mexico, such as Teotihuacán and Tenochtitlan. Maya monarchs ruled their kingdoms from palaces that were situated within the centre of their cities. Cities tended to be located in places that controlled trade routes or that could supply essential products. This allowed the elites that controlled trade to increase their wealth and status. Such cities were able to construct temples for public ceremonies, thus attracting further inhabitants to the city. Those cities that had favourable conditions for food production, combined with access to trade routes, were likely to develop into the capital cities of early Maya states.

The political relationship between Classic Maya city-states has been likened to the relationships between city-states in Classical Greece and Renaissance Italy. Some cities were linked to each other by straight limestone causeways, known as sacbeob, although whether the exact function of these roads was commercial, political or religious has not been determined.

== Architectural organization ==
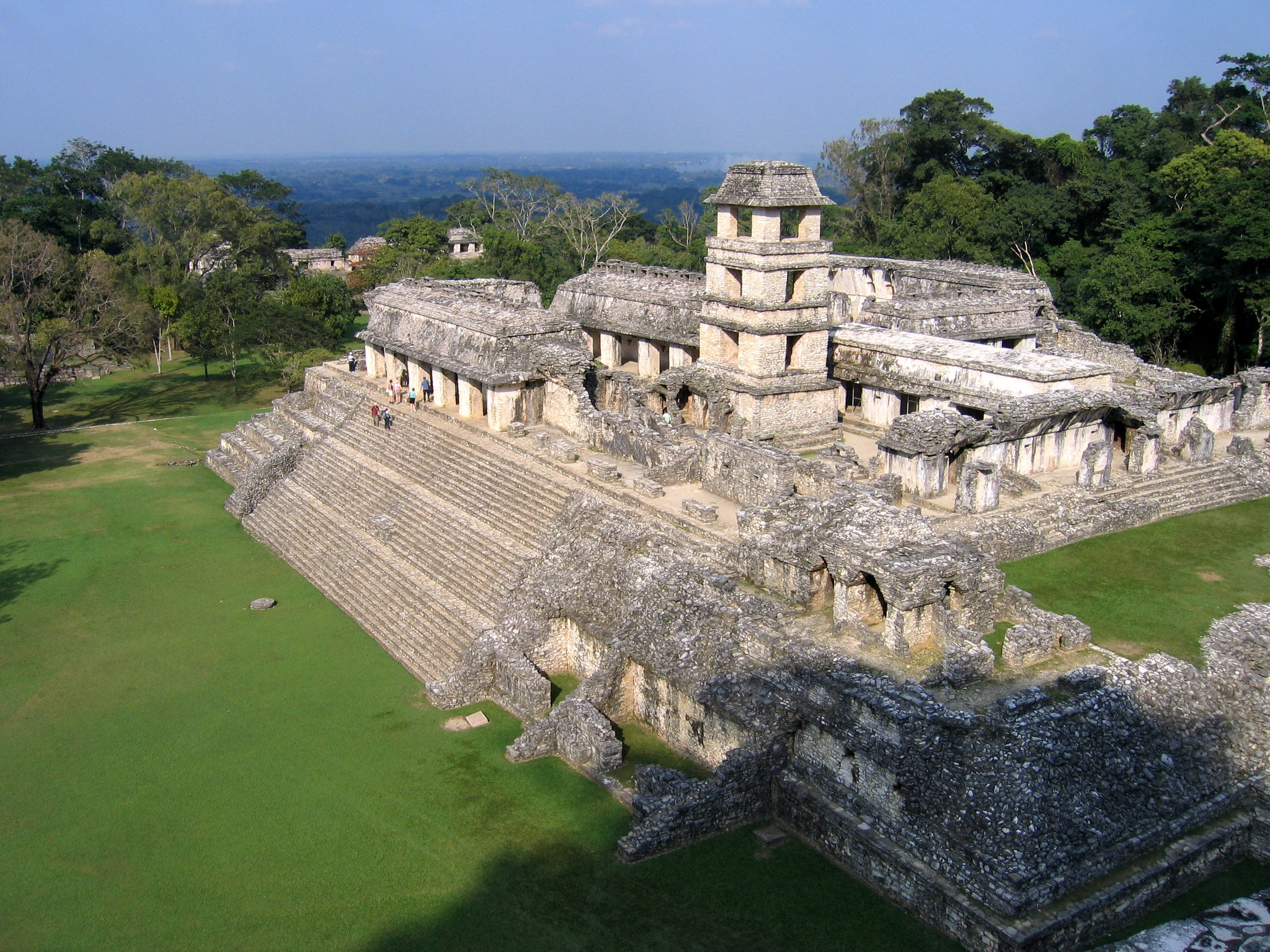
Classic Period royal palace at Palenque

Maya cities were not formally planned like the cities of highland Mexico and were subject to irregular expansion, with the haphazard addition to all of the palaces, temples and other buildings. Most Maya cities tended to grow outwards from the core, and upwards as new structures were superimposed upon preceding architecture. Maya cities usually had a ceremonial and administrative centre surrounded by a vast irregular sprawl of residential complexes. The centres of all Maya cities featured sacred precincts, sometimes separated from nearby residential areas by walls. These precincts contained pyramid temples and other monumental architecture dedicated to elite activities, such as basal platforms that supported administrative or elite residential complexes. Sculpted monuments were raised to record the deeds of the ruling dynasty. City centres also featured plazas, sacred ballcourts and buildings used for marketplaces and schools. Frequently causeways linked the centre to outlying areas of the city. Some of these classes of architecture formed lesser groups in the outlying areas of the city, which served as sacred centres for non-royal lineages. The areas adjacent to these sacred compounds included residential complexes housing wealthy lineages. Art excavated from these elite residential complexes varies in quality according to the rank and prestige of the lineage that it housed. The largest and richest of these elite compounds sometimes possessed sculpture and art of craftsmanship equal to that of royal art.

The ceremonial centre of the Maya city was where the ruling elite lived, and where the administrative functions of the city were performed, together with religious ceremonies. It was also where the inhabitants of the city gathered for public activities. Elite residential complexes occupied the best land around the city centre, while commoners had their residences dispersed further away from the ceremonial centre. Residential units were built on top of stone platforms to raise them above the level of the rain season floodwaters.

== Population estimates ==
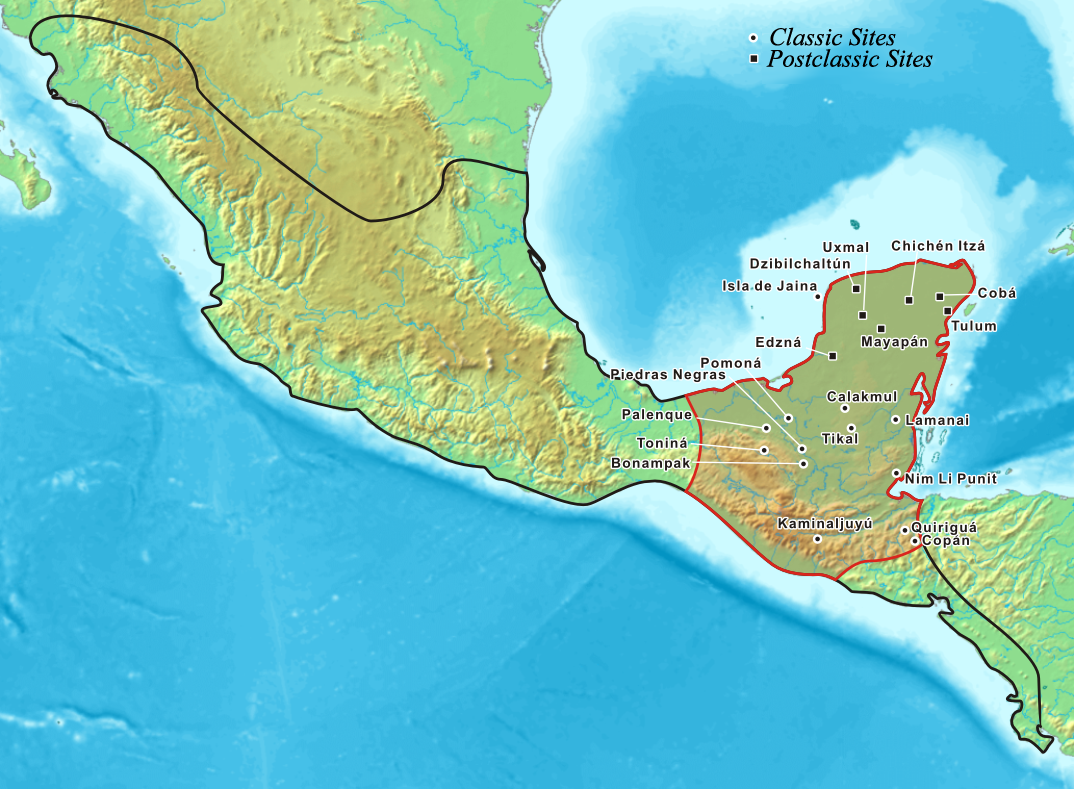
Map of the Maya region showing locations of some of the principal cities. Click to enlarge.

Until the 1960s, scholarly opinion was that the ruins of Maya centres were not true cities but were rather empty ceremonial centres where the priesthood performed religious rituals for the peasant farmers, who lived dispersed in the middle of the jungle. Since the 1960s, formal archaeological mapping projects have revealed that the ceremonial centres in fact formed the centres of dispersed cities that possessed populations that at some sites could reach tens of thousands.

Estimated populations
Site name	Location	Maximum population	Period
Bonampak	Chiapas, Mexico	6,000-8,000	Late Classic
Coba	Quintana Roo, Mexico	50,000	Late Classic
Copán	Copán Department, Honduras	15,000-21,000	Late Classic
Calakmul	Campeche, Mexico	50,000	Late Classic
Caracol	Cayo District, Belize	140,000	Classic
Chichen Itza	Yucatán, Mexico	50,000	Postclassic
Cival	Petén Department, Guatemala	2,000-5,000	Late Preclassic
Dzibanche	Quintana Roo, Mexico	40,000-50,000	Classic
Dzibilchaltun	Yucatán, Mexico	25,000-40,000	Late Preclassic
Edzna	Campeche, Mexico	25,000	Late Classic
El Pilar	Cayo District, Belize; Petén Department, Guatemala	180,000	Late Classic
Ek' Balam	Yucatán, Mexico	12,000-18,000	Postclassic
Ichkabal	Quintana Roo, Mexico	100,000	Late Classic
Mayapan	Yucatán, Mexico	12,000	Late Postclassic
Mixco Viejo (Jilotepeque Viejo)	Chimaltenango Department, Guatemala	1,500	Late Postclassic
Motul de San José	Petén Department, Guatemala	1,200-2,000	Late Classic
Palenque	Chiapas, Mexico	8,000-10,000	Late Classic
Quiriguá	Izabal Department, Guatemala	1,200–1,600	Late Classic
Qʼumarkaj	Quiché Department, Guatemala	15,000	Late Postclassic
Río Azul	Petén Department, Guatemala	3,500	Early Classic
Santa Rita, Corozal	Corozal District, Belize	7,000	Late Postclassic
Sayil	Yucatán, Mexico	10,000	Terminal Classic
Seibal	Petén Department, Guatemala	10,000	Late Preclassic
Tikal	Petén Department, Guatemala	100,000	Late Classic
Uxmal	Yucatán, Mexico	25,000	Late Postclassic
Valeriana	Campeche, Mexico	30,00-50,000	Late Preclassic
Xunantunich	Cayo District, Belize	10,000	Terminal Classic

== History ==
=== Middle Preclassic Period ===
During the Middle Preclassic Period (1000-400 BC), small villages began to grow to form cities. Aguada Fenix in Tabasco, Mexico is the oldest Maya city known, the site was built in 1000 BC, it is thought to have been built by communal labor, an early form of social organization and development where it is believed that many tribes decided to establish a major settlement marking the beginnings of the Maya civilization. Aguada Fenix includes early monumental buildings and the oldest and biggest Maya structure by volume with 1400 meters long, 400 meters wide and 15 meters high. Aguada Fenix was abandoned around the year 750 BC for unknown reasons, after this, several sites started to flourish along the Maya Lowlands. By 500 BC these cities possessed large temple structures decorated with stucco masks representing gods. Nakbe in the Petén Department of Guatemala is the earliest well-documented city in the Maya lowlands, where large structures have been dated to around 750 BC. Nakbe already featured the monumental masonry architecture, sculpted monuments and causeways that characterised later cities in the Maya lowlands.

=== Late Preclassic Period ===
In the Late Preclassic Period (400 BC - 250 AD), the enormous city of El Mirador grew to cover approximately 16 square kilometres (6.2 sq mi). It possessed paved avenues, massive triadic pyramid complexes dated to around 150 BC, and stelae and altars that were erected in its plazas. El Mirador is considered to be one of the first capital cities of the Maya civilization. The swamps of the Mirador Basin appear to have been the primary attraction for the first inhabitants of the area as evidenced by the unusual cluster of large cities around them.

The city of Tikal, later to be one of the most important of the Classic Period Maya cities, was already a significant city by around 350 BC, although it did not match El Mirador. The Late Preclassic cultural florescence collapsed in the 1st century AD and many of the great Maya cities of the epoch were abandoned; the cause of this collapse is as yet unknown.

In the highlands, Kaminaljuyu in the Valley of Guatemala was already a sprawling city by AD 300.

=== Classic Period ===
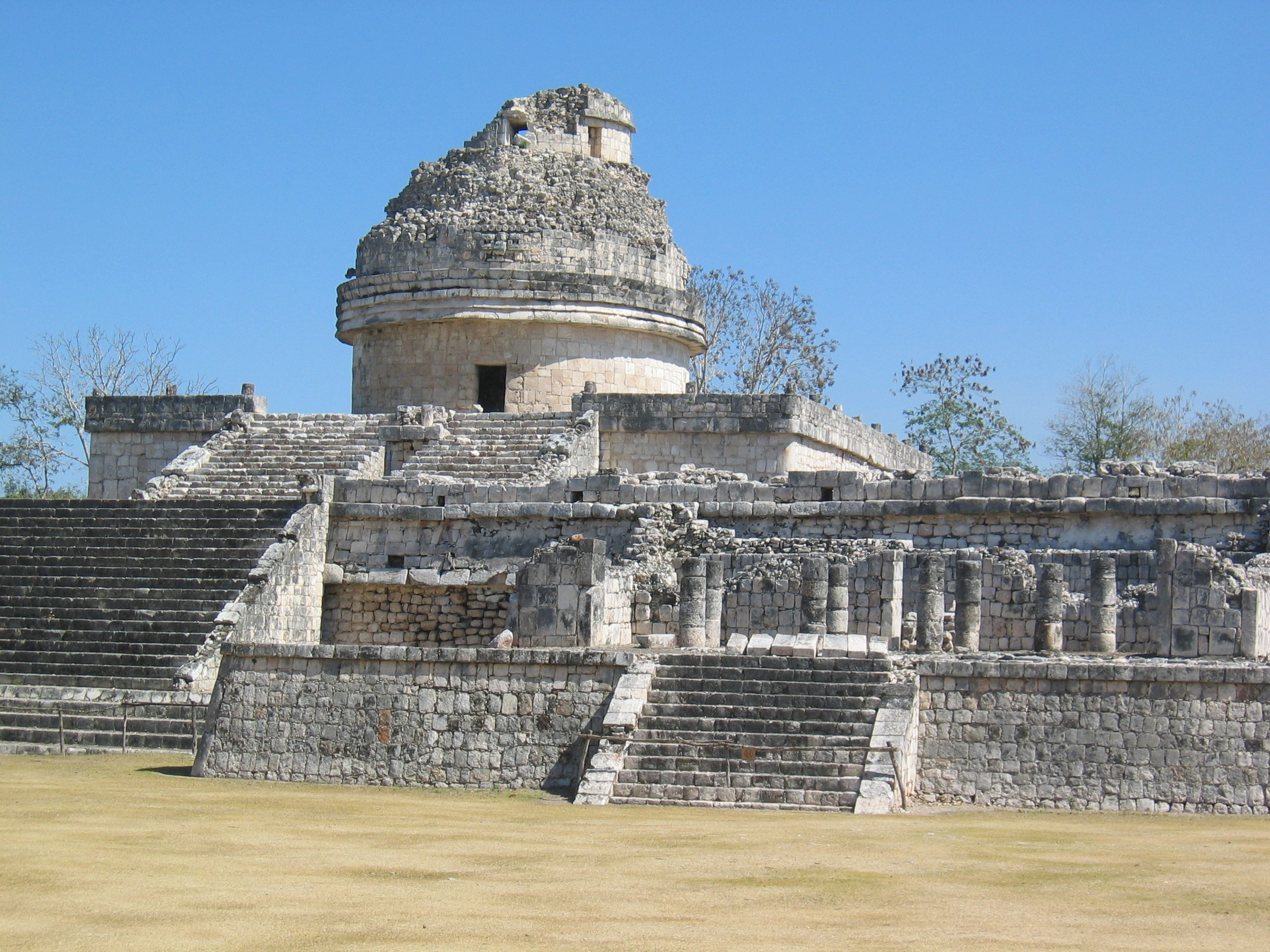
Chichén Itzá was the most important city in the northern Maya region.

During the Classic Period (AD 250-900), the Maya civilization achieved its greatest florescence. During the Early Classic (AD 250-300), cities throughout the Maya region were influenced by the great metropolis of Teotihuacan in the distant Valley of Mexico. At its height during the Late Classic, Tikal had expanded to have a population of well over 100,000. Tikal's great rival was Calakmul, another powerful city in the Petén Basin. In the southeast, Copán was the most important city. Palenque and Yaxchilán were the most powerful cities in the Usumacinta region. In the north of the Maya area, Coba was the most important Maya capital. Capital cities of Maya kingdoms could vary considerably in size, apparently related to how many vassal cities were tied to the capital. Overlords of city-states that held sway over a greater number of subordinate lords could command greater quantities of tribute in the form of goods and labour. The most notable forms of tribute pictured on Maya ceramics are cacao, textiles and feathers. During the 9th century AD, the central Maya region suffered major political collapse, marked by the abandonment of cities, the ending of dynasties and a northward shift of population. During this period, known as the Terminal Classic, the northern cities of Chichen Itza and Uxmal show increased activity. Major cities in Mexico's Yucatán Peninsula continued to be inhabited long after the cities of the southern lowlands ceased to raise monuments.

=== Postclassic Period ===
The Postclassic Period (AD 900-c.1524) was marked by a series of changes that distinguished its cities from those of the preceding Classic Period. The once-great city of Kaminaljuyu in the Valley of Guatemala was abandoned after a period of continuous occupation that spanned almost two thousand years. This was symptomatic of changes that were sweeping across the highlands and neighbouring Pacific coast, with long-occupied cities in exposed locations relocated, apparently due to a proliferation of warfare. Cities came to occupy more-easily defended hilltop locations surrounded by deep ravines, with ditch-and-wall defences sometimes supplementing the protection provided by the natural terrain. Chichen Itza, in the north, became what was probably the largest, most powerful and most cosmopolitan of all Maya cities. One of the most important cities in the Guatemalan Highlands at this time was Qʼumarkaj, also known as Utatlán, the capital of the aggressive Kʼicheʼ Maya kingdom.

=== Conquest and rediscovery ===
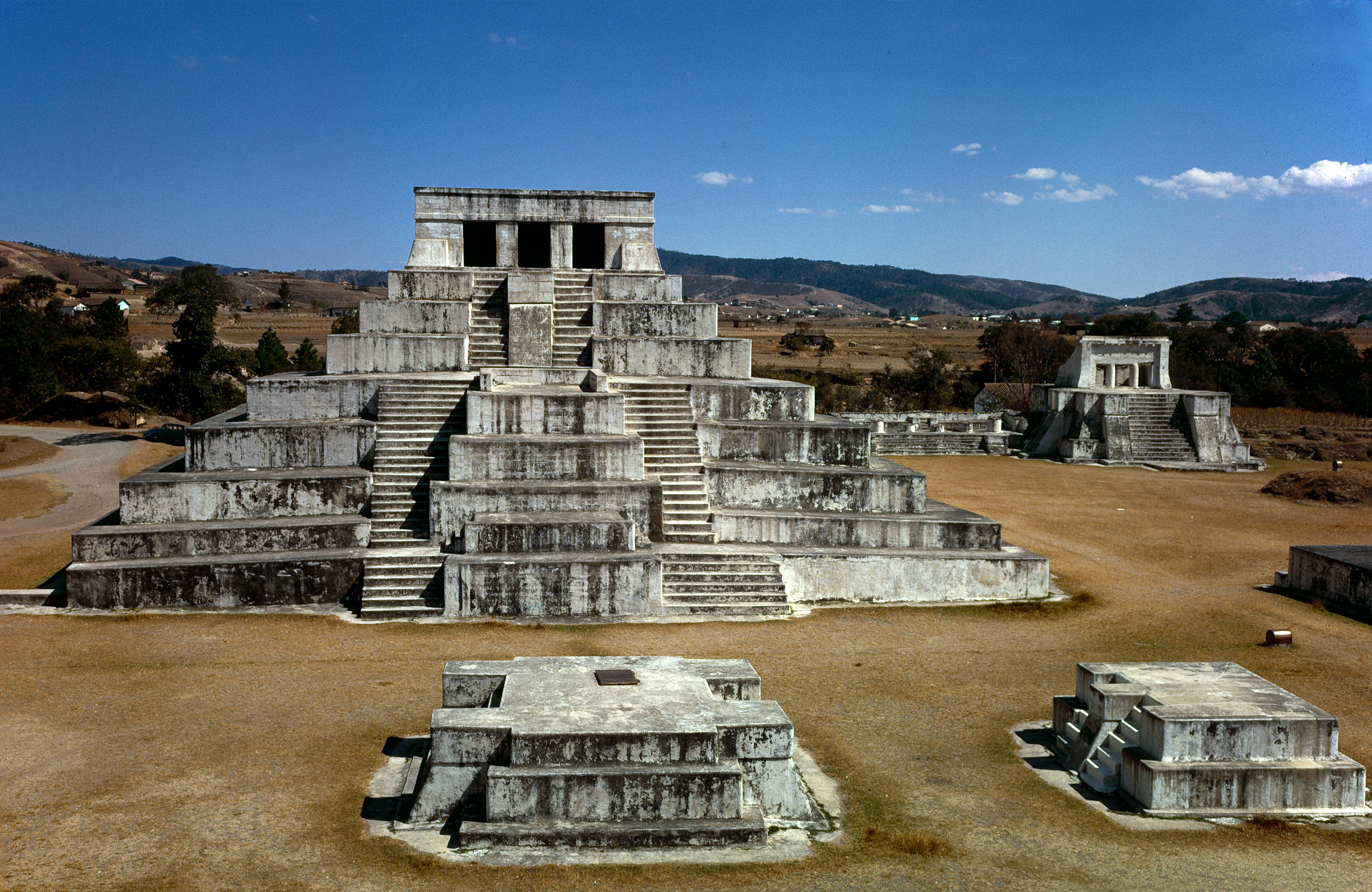
Zaculeu fell to the Spanish in 1525.

The cities of the Postclassic highland Maya kingdoms fell to the invading Spanish conquistadors in the first half of the 16th century. The Kʼicheʼ capital, Qʼumarkaj, fell to Pedro de Alvarado in 1524. Shortly afterwards, the Spanish were invited as allies into Iximche, the capital city of the Kaqchikel Maya. Good relations did not last and the city was abandoned a few months later. This was followed by the fall of Zaculeu, the Mam Maya capital, in 1525. In 1697, Martín de Ursúa launched an assault upon the Itza capital Nojpetén and the last remaining independent Maya city fell to the Spanish.

By the 19th century, the existence of five former Maya cities was known in the Petén region of Guatemala. Nojpetén had been visited by Spanish conquistador Hernán Cortés in 1525, followed by a number of missionaries at the beginning of the 17th century. The city was finally razed when it was conquered in 1697. Juan Galindo, governor of Petén, described the ruins of the Postclassic city of Topoxte in 1834. Modesto Méndez, a later governor of Petén, published a description of the ruins of the once great city of Tikal in 1848. Teoberto Maler described the ruins of the city of Motul de San José in 1895. San Clemente was described by Karl Sapper in the same year. The number of known cities grew enormously during the course of the 20th century; 24 cities in Petén alone had been described by 1938.
