= Graffito (archaeology) =

Drawing or light engraving made with a point on a hard support

A graffito (plural "graffiti"), in an archaeological context, is a deliberate mark made by scratching or engraving on a large surface such as a wall. The marks may form an image or writing. The term is not usually used for the engraved decoration on small objects such as bones, which make up a large part of the art of the Upper Paleolithic, but might be used for the engraved images, usually of animals, that are commonly found in caves, though much less well known than the cave paintings of the same period; often the two are found in the same caves.

In archaeology, the term may or may not include the more common modern sense of an "unauthorized" addition to a building or monument. Sgraffito, a decorative technique of partially scratching off a top layer of plaster or some other material to reveal a differently colored material beneath, is also sometimes known as "graffito".

== Categories ==
The basic categories of graffiti in archaeology are:

- Written graffiti, or informal inscriptions.
- Images in graffiti.
- Complex, merged, or multiple-category graffiti.

== Antiquity ==
=== Ancient Egypt ===
Modern knowledge of the history of Ancient Egypt was originally derived from inscriptions, literature, (Books of the Dead), pharaonic historical records, and reliefs, from temple statements, and numerous individual objects whether pharaonic or for the Egyptian citizenry. Twentieth-century developments led to finding less common sources of information indicating the intricacies of the interrelationships of the pharaoh, his appointees, and the citizenry.

Three minor sources have helped link the major pieces of interrelationships in Ancient Egypt: ostraca, scarab artifacts, and numerous temple, quarry, etc. sources have helped fill in minor pieces of the complex dealings in Ancient Egypt. The reliefs, and writings with the reliefs, are often supplemented with a graffito, often in hieratic and discovered in locations not commonly seen, like a door jamb, hallway, entranceway, or the side or reverse of an object.

==== Late (Roman) Demotic ====
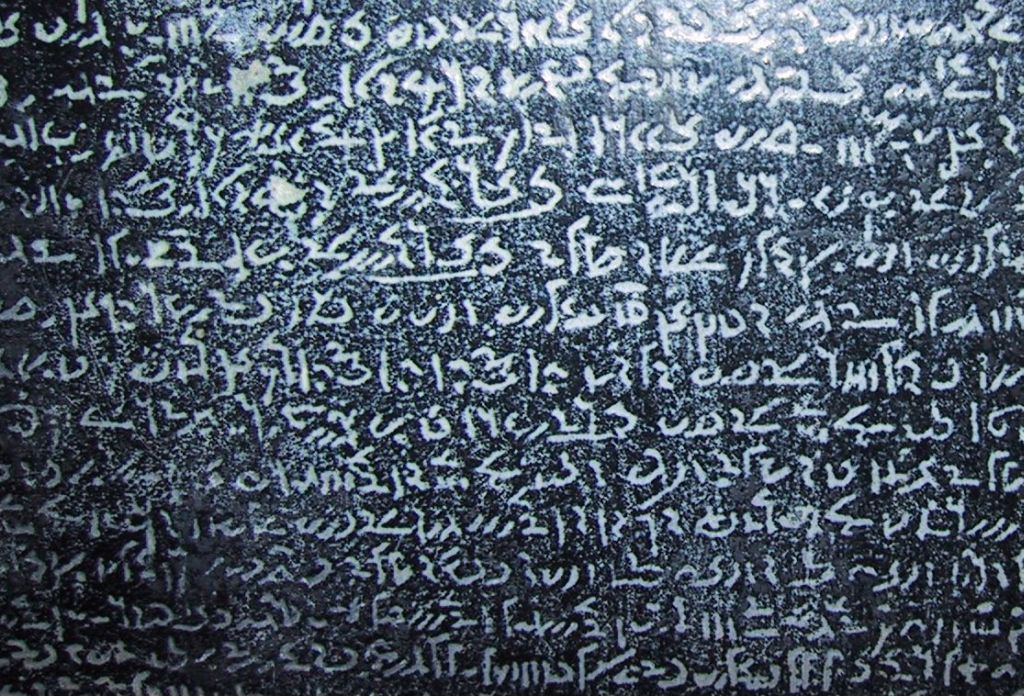
Example of Demotic "Egyptian" script from a Rosetta Stone Replica, 198 BCE.

Very late Egyptian Demotic was used only for ostraca, mummy labels, subscriptions to Greek texts, and graffiti. The last dated example of Egyptian Demotic is from the Temple of Isis at Philae, dated 11 December 452 CE. See Demotic "Egyptian".

==== Deir el-Bahri ====
Pilgrims to religious sites left numerous graffiti at the Egyptian site of Deir el-Bahri.

=== Ancient Athens ===
Large quantities of graffiti have been found in Athens during excavations by the American School of Classical Studies at Athens; nearly 850 were catalogued by Mabel Lang in 1976. These include a variety of different types of graffiti, such as abecedaria, kalos inscriptions, insults, marks of ownership, commercial notations, dedications, Christian inscriptions, messages, lists and pictures. They date from the eighth century BC through to the late Roman period.

=== Ancient Rome ===
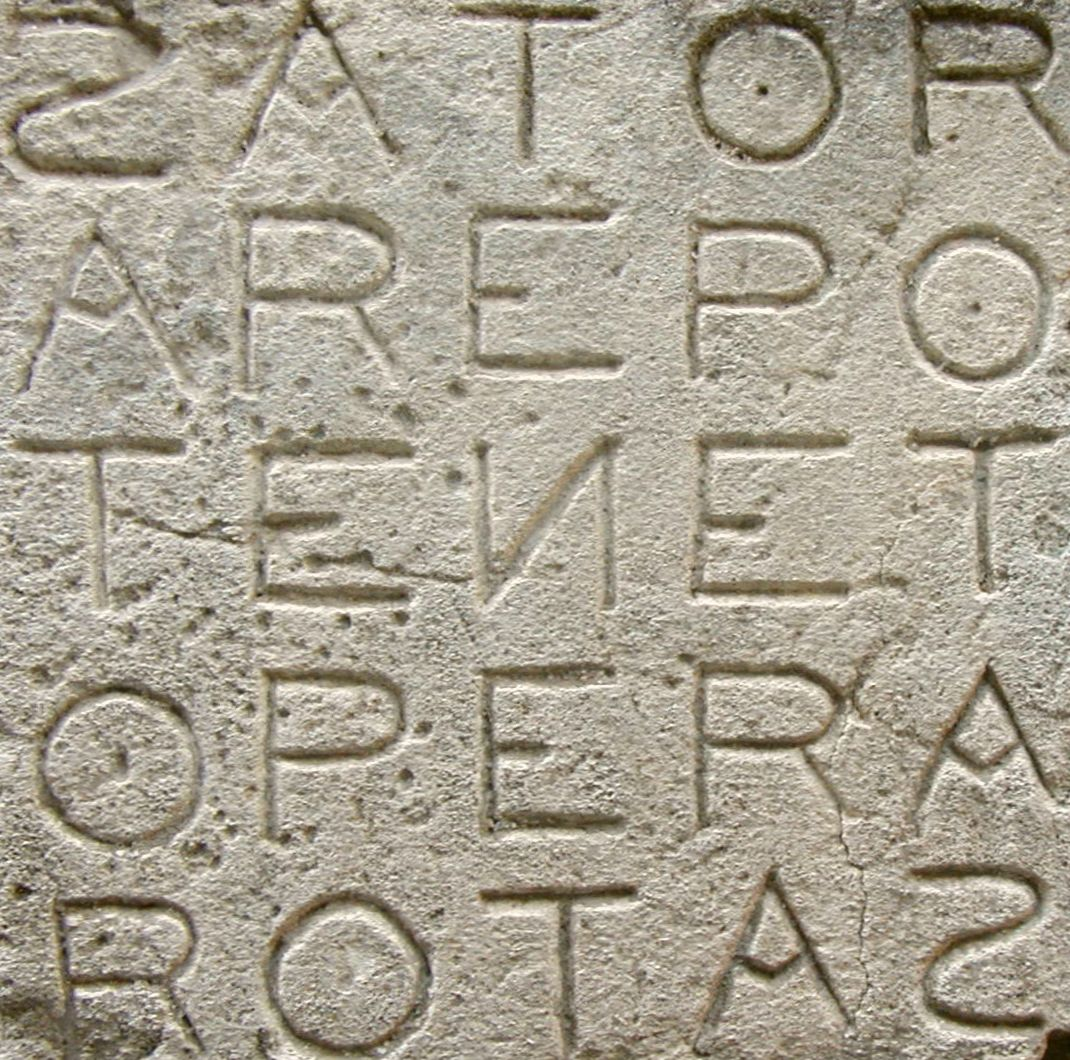
The "Sator Opera Tenet" square as seen in Oppède, France.

The Sator square (originally the "Rotas-Sator square") is a Latin graffito found at numerous sites throughout the Roman Empire (e.g. Pompeii, Dura-Europos), and elsewhere (United Kingdom) with the earliest versions dated to pre-A.D. 62 in Pompeii. The square became a powerful religious, and magical symbol, throughout medieval Europe.

=== Gallery ===
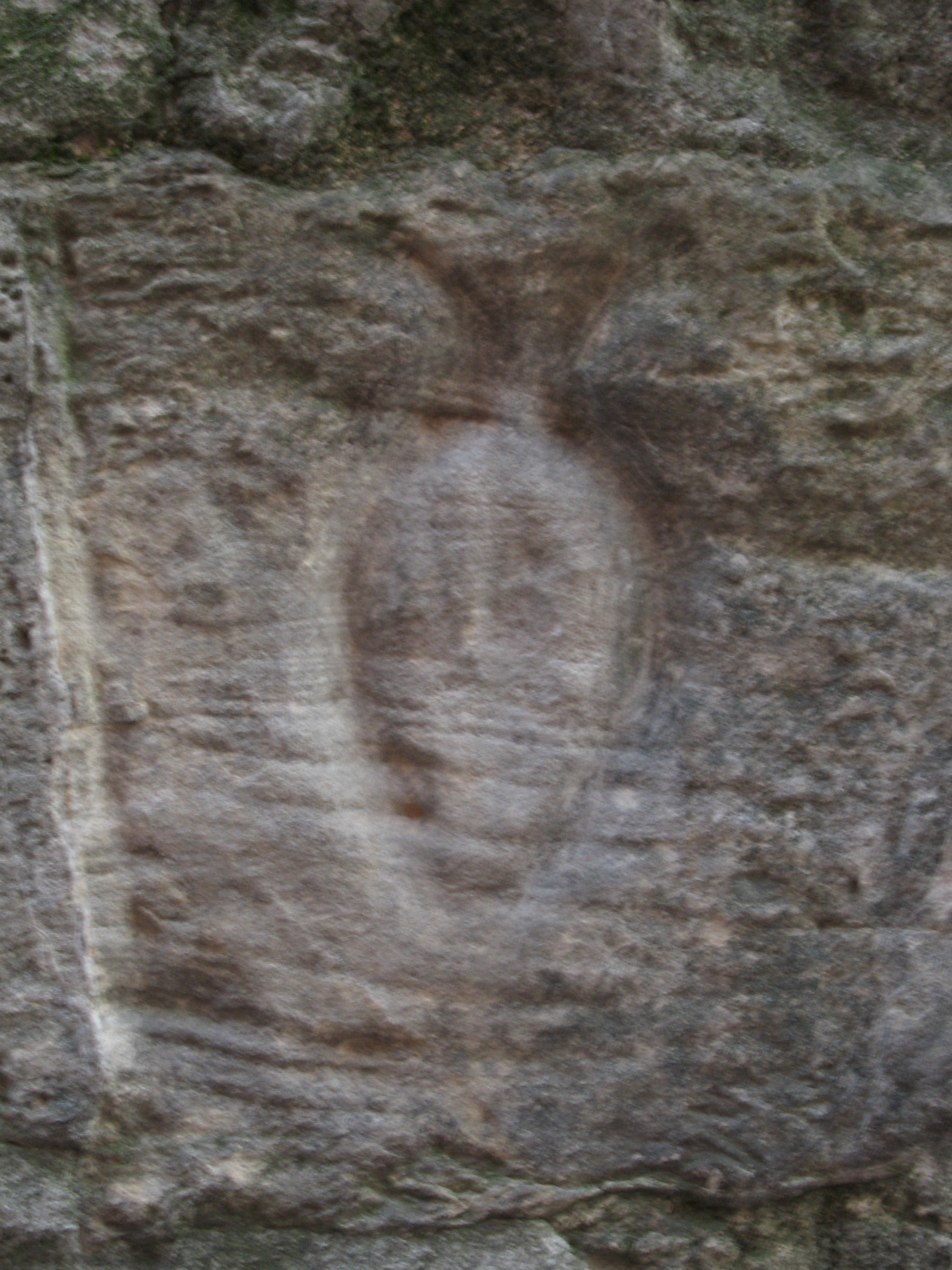
A louse graffito at a Rome gate

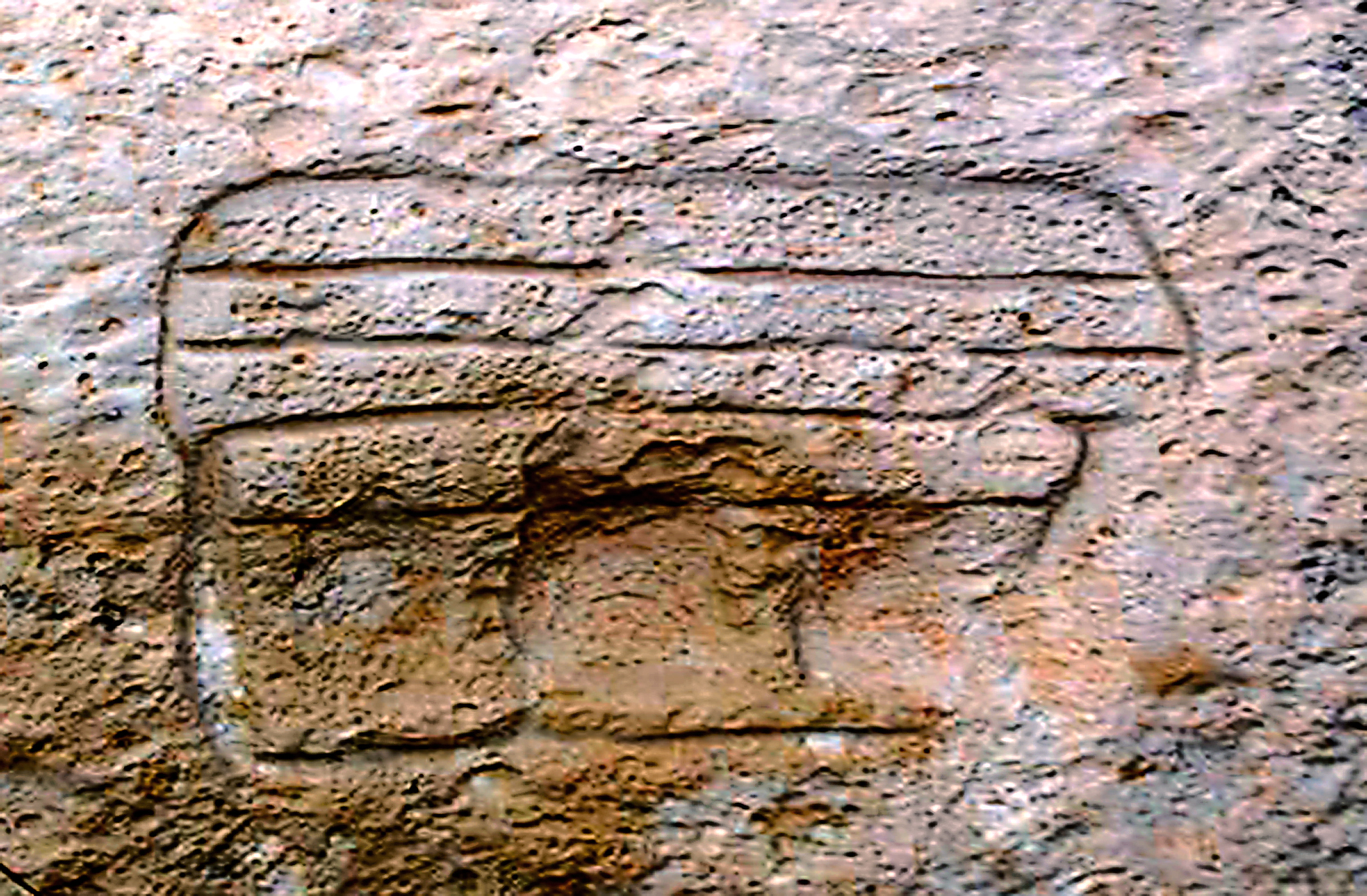
Malta temple graffito: Mnajdra

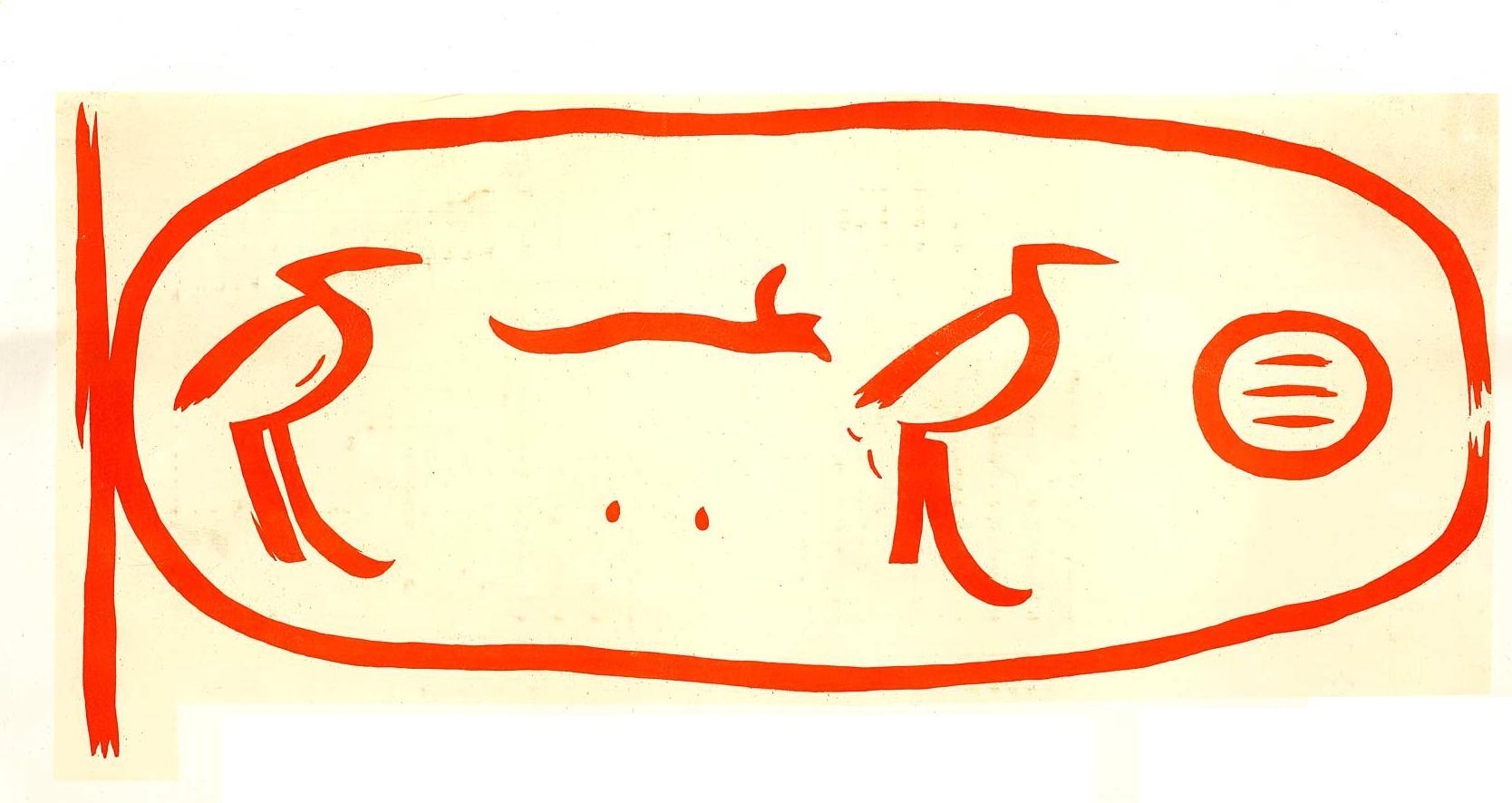
Khufu's pyramid graffito, with his cartouche name

== Medieval Britain ==
There are several types of graffiti found in British buildings dating from the Middle Ages. There is a wide range of graffiti to be found on medieval buildings and especially in churches. These are some of the most common types:

- Architectural drawings
- Compass drawings
- Crosses
- Early text
- Figures
- Heraldry
- Mason's marks
- Merchant's marks
- Pentangles
- Ship graffiti
- Solomon's knot
- VV Symbols

Medieval graffiti is a relatively new area of study with the first full-length work being produced in 1967 by Violet Pritchard. The Norfolk Medieval Graffiti Survey was established in 2010 with the aim of undertaking the first large-scale survey of medieval graffiti in the UK. The survey primarily looks at graffiti dating from the fourteenth to seventeenth centuries. Since 2010 a number of other county based surveys have been set up. These include Kent, Suffolk and Surrey.

The examples below are from Saint Nicholas, the parish church of Blakeney.

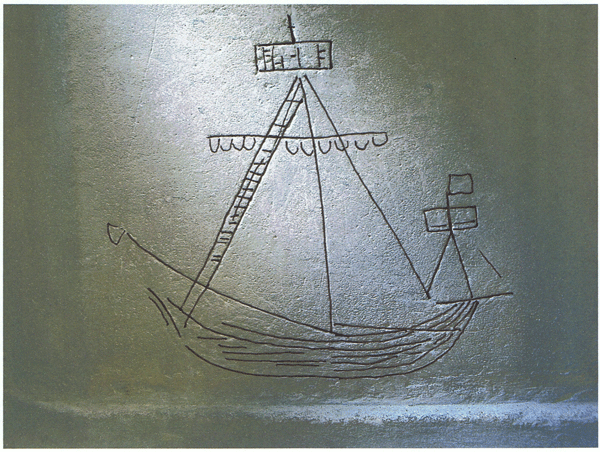
A ship graffito

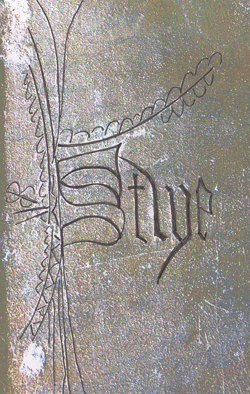
Graffito with a decorated capital letter

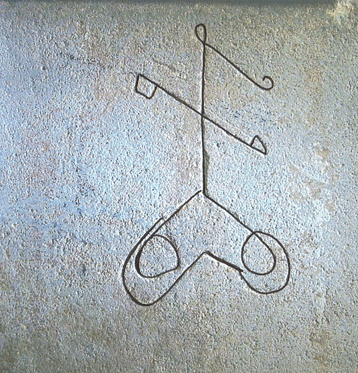
A mason's mark

== Modern imaging technology ==
The images above were enhanced by using multiple light sources when photographing, but more recent examples in Malta used eye-tracking devices and generative algorithms to create a database that enabled the creation of 3D images and video in addition to the standard perspective.

== See also ==
- Ancient Maya graffiti
- Graffiti
- Roman graffiti
- Ostracon
- Scarab artifact
