= San Clemente, El Petén =

Mayan ruin in Guatemala

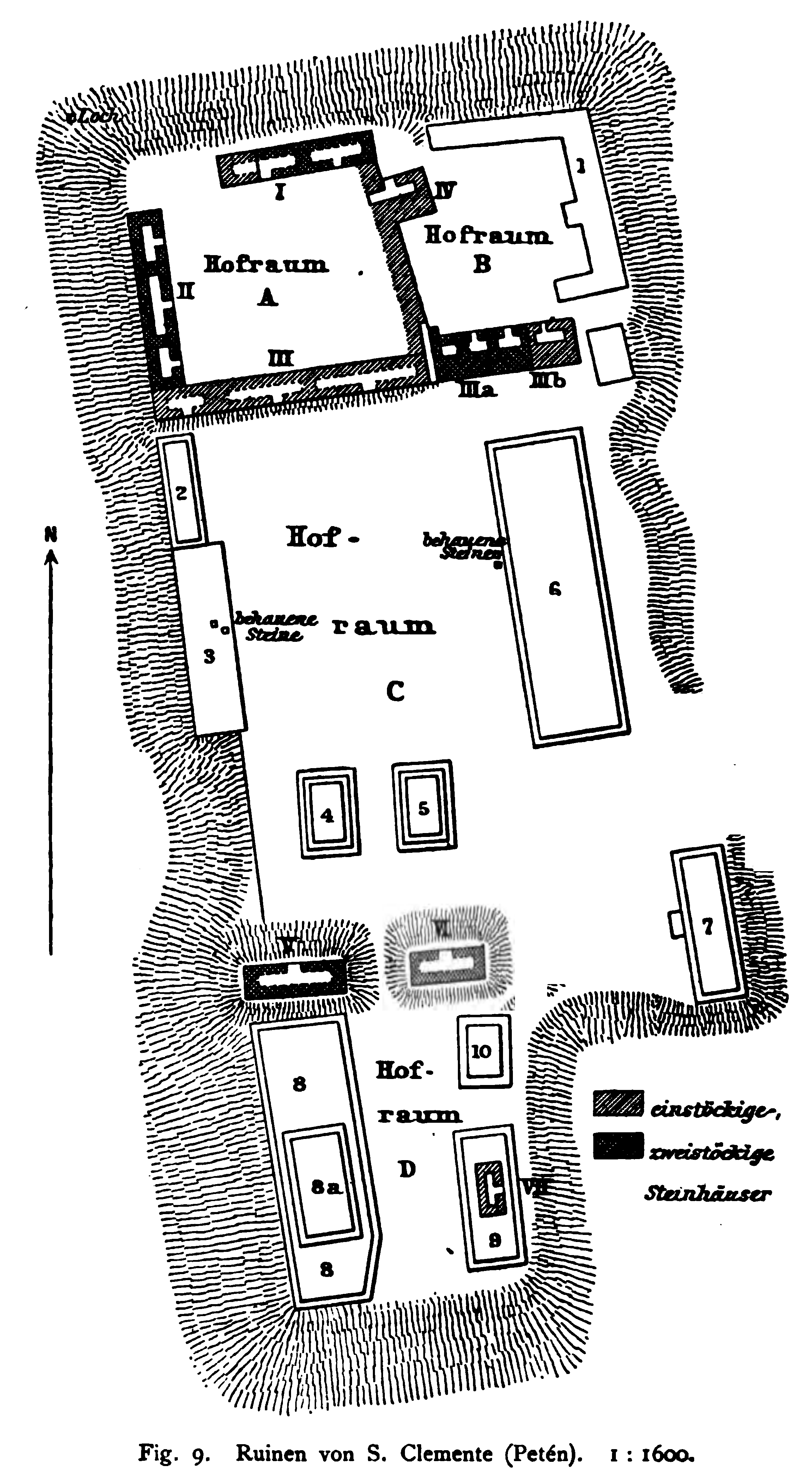
Plan of San Clemente as published by German explorer Karl Sapper in 1897. Note the structure numbering differs from that in later use.

San Clemente is a ruin of the ancient Maya civilization in Guatemala. Its main period of occupation dates to the Classic period of Mesoamerican chronology (approximately 250 – 950 AD). The ruins were first described in the late 19th century, before being visited by a number of investigators in the early part of the 20th century.

== Location ==
The site is situated in the Petén Basin, approximately 55 kilometres (34 mi) from Flores, in the department of El Petén of northern Guatemala. It is 13 kilometres (8.1 mi) north of the modern settlement of El Naranjo, within the municipality of Flores. The site occupies a deforested hilltop at an elevation of 270 metres (890 ft) above mean sea level. San Clemente is located in the north of the Maya Biosphere Reserve.

== Name ==
The ruins were given the name San Clemente in the late 19th century by Karl Sapper, after a camp to the west of the site. Sylvanus Morley named the site Chinchantun ("small stone" in Mayan), but the earlier name was adopted by Frans Blom and later investigators.

== History ==
The site was first occupied during the Early Classic (c. 250–550 AD), when simple platforms were built directly upon the bedrock, around unsurfaced plazas. The city underwent a major construction phase during the Late Classic (c. 550–830), with the development of monumental platforms and the construction of two Mesoamerican ballcourts. The architecture visible today dates to the Terminal Classic (c. 830–950). Principal activity at the site has been dated according to ceramic evidence to the period running from c. 450 to c. 900.

=== Modern history ===
San Clemente was first described by Karl Sapper in 1895, and was visited by various expeditions during the course of the 20th century, including by noted archaeologists Frans Blom and Sylvanus Morley. The site was rediscovered in 1992 by the archaeological rescue project of the Cultural Triangle Yaxha-Nakum-Naranjo National Park, and was investigated by archaeologists from 1995 to 2006, who carried out some restoration work in the northern sector of the site in 2006 and 2007.

== Site description ==
San Clemente was one of the most important Maya cities in the region immediately to the southwest of Yaxha; the site core covers an area of approximately 60,000 square metres (650,000 sq ft) and includes an acropolis, and two ballcourts, which are oriented north-south. The architecture of San Clemente is grouped into three principal sectors, the northern sector labelled the Palace, the central sector consisting of the Main Plaza, and the Elevated South Group. The three architectural groups are aligned upon a north-south axis. There are examples of range-type structures at San Clemente with masonry pillars supporting the facade. Structures were numbered by early investigators from north to south. The site core was accessed by a causeway that approached from the east to join the Main Plaza.

In addition to the three main architectural groups of the site core, there are a number of smaller satellite groups. To the east of the Palace complex is a basal platform supporting a number of low platforms arranged around patios. Investigating archaeologists have suggested that this was the service complex associated with the palace. To the east of the South Plaza is a terrace (the Southeast Plaza), and to the west is the Southwest Plaza.

=== Palace ===
The Palace is laid out around two interior patios (the Upper Court and the Lower Court). The floor levels of the two patios differ by 7 metres (23 ft). Structures I through to IV surround the Upper Court, which is linked to the Lower Court by an internal stairway contained within Structure IV. Structure IV is built against the east side of the retaining wall separating the east side of the Upper Court from the west side of the Lower Court. Structure III is a two-storey range-type structure in the palace, facing south onto the Main Plaza. It separates the Plaza from the Upper Court. Structure VII is a well-preserved building on the south side of the Lower Court, separating it from the Main Plaza. Three chambers in the structure open directly onto the Lower Court. An interior room is accessed via the westernmost of these chambers. The east wall of the western chamber contains a niche, marked in antiquity with red hand-prints upon its stucco while it was still fresh. The Lower Court is linked to the Main Plaza by a narrow passage at the western extreme of Structure VII. The western wall of the passage was marked with ancient graffiti scratched into the stucco, very similar to graffiti found at Tikal. The graffiti includes crude figures ang geometric shapes. Structure V lies along the north side of the Lower Court, and Structure VI delimits its eastern side. Both of these are badly preserved.

=== Main Plaza ===
All the buildings arranged around the Main Plaza face towards it. The Plaza is rectangular and divided into two portions by Ballcourt 1. The northern portion of the Main Plaza measures 45 by 45 metres (148 by 148 ft); it is bordered on three sides by buildings. The southern portion is open on the east side where the causeway provided the principal entrance to the site core, and is also bordered by the edge of Ballcourt 2.

Structures IX and X close the west side of the Main Plaza. Structure IX, the northernmost of the two, is a platform that is likely to have supported a building. No traces of any building were found on top of Structure X, however three sculpted limestone stelae were raised at its base. Structure XIII is a long platform closing the east side of the Plaza; it supported a building upon its southern half. Four small stelae (Stelae 4–7) were raised at the base of Structure XIII. Altars were placed before Stela 4 and Stela 5.

Structures XI and XII are low mounds in the southwestern portion of the Plaza. They were built from rough boulders and each stands between 3 and 4 metres (9.8 and 13.1 ft) high.

Structures XIV and XV are twin pyramids standing on the south side of the Main Plaza. These steep-sided, stepped pyramids were faces with cut limestone blocks, and each supported a summit shrine; they are similar is style to the principal pyramids found at Tikal and Yaxha. The summit structures were accessed via stairways on the north faces of the pyramids, which descended to the Main Plaza. Behind the eastern pyramid, a passage descends to the Southeast Plaza.

=== South Plaza ===
The South Plaza, sometimes referred to as the Elevated South Group, is immediately to the south of the Main Plaza. Its floor level is 3 metres (9.8 ft) higher than that of the Main Plaza, and it is accessed via a stairway climbing between the twin pyramids (Structures XIV and XV).

Structure XVI is a long mound closing the west side of the plaza; it is in a ruinous state and once supported a range structure.

The east side of the plaza is formed by Structures XXII and XVIII. Structure XVIII supported an east-facing building with masonry walls and a perishable roof. In the 1920s, the entrance still supported a zapote-wood lintel.

=== Southeast Plaza ===
The Southeast Plaza is a terrace that extends southwards from the Main Plaza along the east side of the South Plaza. The terrace is 0.5 metres (1.6 ft) higher than the Main Plaza, and had no apparent direct access to it. The north and south sides of the plaza were open. The western side of the plaza is delimited by an isolated range structure, with two chultuns (underground storage chambers) in front of it.

=== Ballcourt 2 ===
The second of the ballcourts is located to the southeast of the site core. It is the larger of the two ballcourts and is well defined, forming a perfect shape. On the north side, a low parapet separates the northern end zone of the ballcourt from the ramp ascending to the Main Plaza. The main playing area is flanked by two solidly constructed buildings, and the southern end zone is marked by low but clearly defined borders. At the western end of the southern end zone, the border is carved from the bedrock; its upper portion is at the same level as the South Plaza. This -shaped ballcourt is the only known example of this form in northeastern Petén.

=== Monuments ===
When Morley visited the site in 1922, he reported the presence of a series of small, heavily eroded stelae. Three stelae were raised at the base of Structure X on the Main Plaza, and four at the base of Structure XIII, also on the Plaza. Although they were sculpted, their poor state of preservation makes their design illegible.
