= Melchor de Mencos =

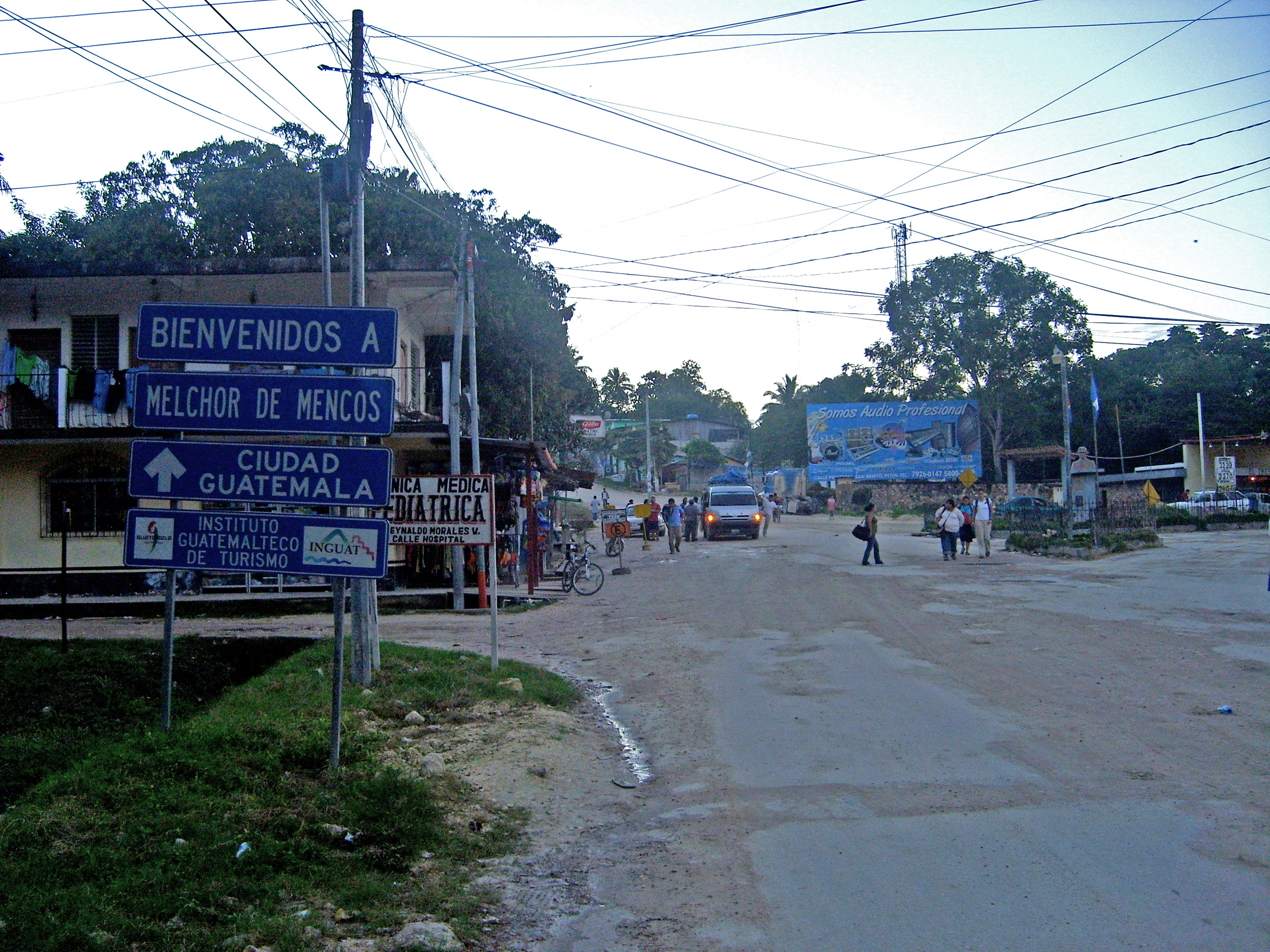
- Centre of Melchor de Mencos

- Location in Guatemala
- Coordinates: 17°04′00″N 89°09′00″W
- Country: Guatemala
- Department: El Petén

Government
  - Mayor: Ricardo Ávila (LIDER)

Population (2022 est.)
  - Total: 31,009
- Climate: Aw

Melchor de Mencos is a municipality in the Petén Department of Guatemala with a population of 23,813. It is situated on the eastern border with Belize, and is the only major border crossing from Guatemala to Belize. The city was established in April 1960. It is named after Sergeant Major Melchor de Mencos y Varón, who in 1754 journeyed with a tiny contingent of Spanish colonial troops from what is now Antigua, Guatemala to the coast of present-day Belize, there to combat English "pirates" who had settled that region and established a self-governing community. A large signboard-map at the border crossing between Benque Viejo del Carmen and Melchor depicts Belize as Guatemala's eastern province, consistent with Guatemala's ongoing claim. Large numbers of its young people attend secondary school across the border in Belize, seeking the competitive benefits of English-language fluency. They can be seen when dropped off on weekday mornings at the Guatemalan end of the pedestrian border crossing, walking through, and boarding the same school buses at the Belizean end, from there to be transported onward to their secondary schools in Benque Viejo del Carmen, Melchor's twin city across the border in Belize, or further afield.

Tensions along the border heightened in the autumn of 2014, following the shooting (presumably by a Guatemalan engaged in illegal exploitation of Belizean timber or other resources) at a major archaeological site in the Cayo District.

Prior to their relocation in 1989, Melchor de Mencos was home to the two training centres of the Guatemalan Army's elite Kaibiles special operations force. The Guatemalan army still maintains a major unit encamped adjacent to the border in Melchor.

The Maya archaeological site of La Blanca is located within the municipality.
