= La Blanca, Peten =

Archaeological site in Petén, Guatemala

La Blanca
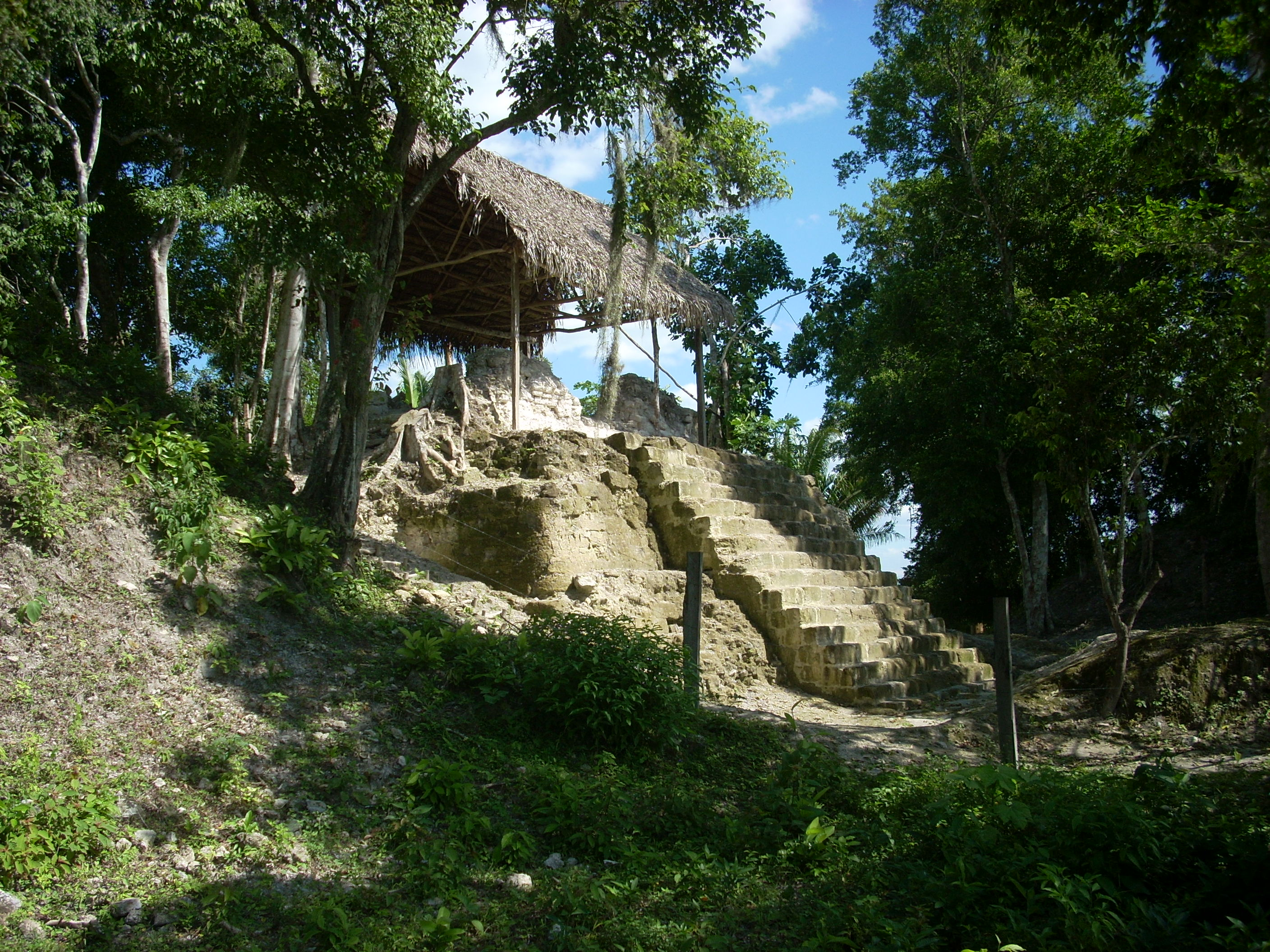
- South Group at La Blanca

- Location of the site La Blanca, Peten (Guatemala)
- 16°54′13″N 89°26′32″W
- Periods: Late Classic to Early Postclassic
- Cultures: Maya civilization
- Location: Melchor de Mencos, Petén Department, Guatemala

Site notes
- Architectural style: Classic Maya
- Archaeologists: Cristina Vidal Lorenzo, Gaspar Muñoz Cosme

La Blanca is a Maya pre-Columbian Mesoamerican archaeological site in the municipality of Melchor de Mencos in the northern Petén Department of Guatemala. It has an occupation dating predominantly from the Middle Preclassic (900–600 BC) period of Mesoamerican chronology. This site belongs to the later period of the Mokaya culture. The site is located in the lower reaches of the Mopan River valley and features a large acropolis complex. Activity at the site has been dated as far back as the Early Classic (AD 250–600), with principal occupation of the site occurring in the Late Classic period (AD 600–900), although some level of occupation continued into the Early Postclassic (AD 900–1200).

La Blanca occupied a frontier zone between the northeastern and southeastern Petén regions and the site is dominated by the acropolis, an especially well built palace complex. The city appears to have been an administrative centre with comparatively little emphasis upon religious or ceremonial activity. It is likely that La Blanca was a subsidiary of a major Maya city such as Yaxha or Naranjo, given the complete absence of hieroglyphic texts and sculpted monuments, and archaeologists presume that La Blanca served as a frontier post or trading centre.

During the Late Classic there was greater public access to the acropolis; as the threat of warfare grew during the Terminal Classic (AD 800–900), access became much more restricted. The end of formal occupation of the city in the Terminal Classic appears to have been violent, with evidence of a battle recovered during excavations of the acropolis. Refugees appear to have occupied the city centre immediately after the collapse of formal settlement at La Blanca, but they abandoned the city for good in the 11th century, after which it was never reoccupied.

The acropolis buildings contain inscribed graffiti dating to the last phase of occupation in the Early Postclassic, including human and animal figures, deities, temples and courtly scenes. Colonial graffiti is also evident from the visit to the ruins by captain Pedro Montañés in the middle of the 18th century.

== Location ==
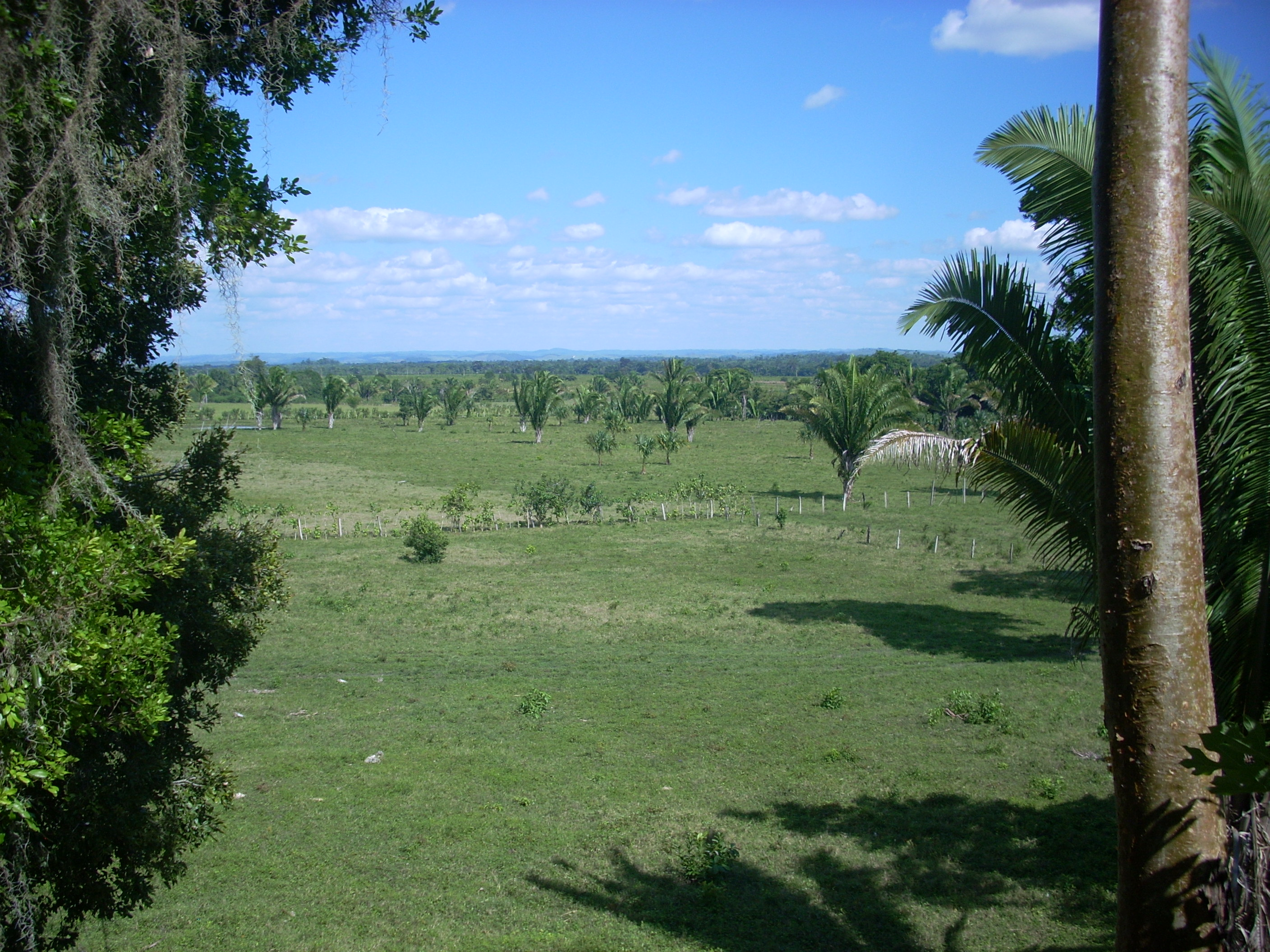
Savannah ranchland surrounds the archaeological site

La Blanca is accessed by a dirt road leading 17 kilometres (11 mi) to the highway linking Flores with Melchor de Mencos; the dirt road joins the highway at La Pólvora. In the other direction this road leads approximately 3 kilometres (1.9 mi) to a village, also called La Blanca; this modern village extends along the shores of a small lake. The archaeological site is located to the south of a range of hills reaching a maximum height of 490 metres (1,610 ft).

The site occupies a small pocket of forest amongst an extensive region of cleared agricultural land. The agricultural land closest to the ruins is largely dedicated to livestock grazing, particularly cattle and horses. La Blanca is located close to the Mopan River and its tributary, the Salsipuedes River. Some of the land between the ruins and the rivers is subject to frequent flooding, a factor that must have had some impact upon the inhabitants of the city. At its peak, this was one of the largest known Mesoamerican sites of that era. It is located on the western Pacific coast, where it rose to become the major regional center following the decline of an earlier polity at Ojo de Agua, Chiapas. La Blanca's regional dominance appears to have lasted approximately three centuries, until it was eclipsed by Ujuxte, 13 km east. This 300-year period is defined as belonging to the Conchas phase. The site covered over 200ha at its peak and boasted some of the earliest monumental architecture in Mesoamerica.

The forest covering the archaeological site reaches an average height of 22 metres (72 ft). It contains around 60 tree species, among which the most notable are breadnut trees (Brosimum alicastrum) and corozo palms (Orbignya cohune).

== History ==
The earliest occupation at La Blanca was concentrated in the South Group and dates to the Early Classic Period. However, major occupation of the site appears to have begun in the Late Classic Period. Public spaces were covered with white stucco and the first architecture was erected at the site. The basal platform of the acropolis appears to have been built before the Great North Plaza was laid out.

In the Late Classic there appears to have been greater public access to the acropolis, with stairways communicating between the various terraces leading up to the south range. During the Terminal Classic, these stairways were filled in, as were many of the access doorways to the acropolis itself, with some buildings being sealed completely. This closing of public access to the palace reflects the greater political instability engulfing the entire Petén region at this time. The acropolis complex was abandoned by the city's elite in the Terminal Classic, a time when most of the city centre was also deserted by its residents. Many flint projectile points were recovered from the south terraces of the acropolis, this combined with the remains of two individuals very near the surface indicates that a violent confrontation took place around the time that the city was abandoned.

Soon afterwards, at the dawn of the Postclassic, immediately after the Classic Maya collapse, the acropolis was reoccupied by refugees from the periphery of the city. These final occupants appear to have abandoned the city some time in the 11th century AD, after which it was never reoccupied.

=== Modern history ===
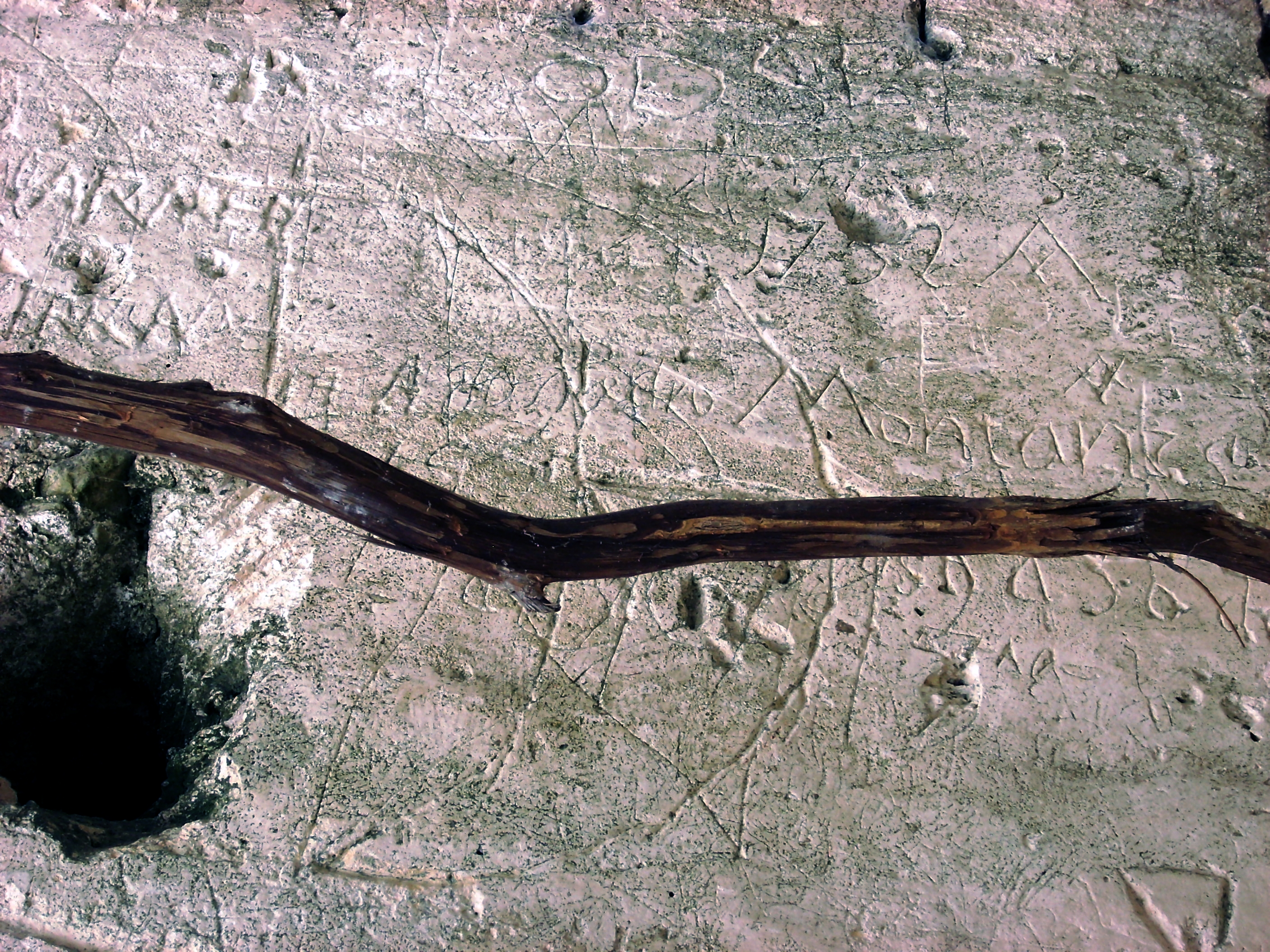
18th-century graffiti in the acropolis

In the 18th century Pedro Montañés passed through the site and left graffiti with his name and the year 1752. Archives have revealed that he was a Spanish captain who visited the site on 14 August of that year. La Blanca was first documented in the early years of the 20th century. In 1905 explorer Teoberto Maler identified visible architecture at the site and marked it as El Castillito on a map of the region. Raymond E. Merwin visited La Blanca in 1913 on behalf of the Peabody Museum of Harvard University. He photographed the site and renamed it as Chac-Ha. At this time the site appears to have been covered in dense vegetation, making exploration of the ruins difficult and resulting in only a brief description of the acropolis.

Ian Graham published a plan of the site in 1980, based on explorations in preceding years. Further explorations have taken place on behalf of the Atlas Arqueológico de Guatemala and the Yaxha-Nakum-Naranjo Project. The Yaxha-Nakum-Naranjo Project started work at the site in 1994 with preliminary work consisted of mapping and photographing the ruins. In 1995 the ruins were cleared of undergrowth and in 1996 the Unidad de Arquelogía Regional de Guatemala (Guatemalan Regional Archaeology Unit) surveyed the ruins, recorded damage by looters and sank test pits, all under the direction of Vilma Fialko. From 1997 to 1998 looting damage was repaired and architecture deemed at risk of collapse was underpinned. In 1999 further underpinning work was undertaken as a result of earthquake damage and detailed plans were made of the architecture in 2000. The Atlas Arqueológico de Guatemala included La Blanca in its survey of three sites in the lower Mopan valley in 2001. More recently, investigations have been funded by the Spanish Ministry of Culture together with the University of Valencia and the Polytechnic University of Valencia. Excavations continued in 2004 both in the city centre and in the South Group, where looting damage was recorded and repaired.

== Site description ==
The site covers an area of about 26 hectares (64 acres) and a great many structures have been identified by archaeologists. The principal architecture has been dated to the Late Classic period. The layout of the city is somewhat unusual in that the north-south axis is oriented 12° west of north whereas most Maya cities have the major axis a similar amount east of north. The political and administrative functions were concentrated in the eastern portion of the city, which is taken to include the South Group, as evidenced by the superior architectural quality in these areas.

The Great North Plaza is a large square-plan plaza measuring 70 by 70 metres (230 by 230 ft). The Plaza was levelled by packing it with a clay-based mud, work that took place in the Late Classic Period based on the evidence of ceramic and flint artefacts recovered during investigations. This clay mud containing attapulgite was likely to have been brought to the city from the nearby swamps. Excavations in the plaza and close to the acropolis revealed the presence of a retaining wall probably related to the construction of the great platform supporting the acropolis itself.

A 30-metre (98 ft) wide causeway runs south from the Plaza, running to the west of the acropolis and parallel to it. This causeway runs south for approximately 300 metres (980 ft) to the South Group. The area west of the causeway contains a large number of smaller mounds and platforms and is believed to be an extensive residential area. This residential area includes three large plazas, the northern of which is divided from the Great North Plaza by a row of structures. A stairway may have led southwards from this down to the Central West Plaza, which is on the opposite side of the causeway from the Acropolis. The south side of the Central West Plaza is bordered by a 30-metre (98 ft) long structure that divides it from the South West Plaza. An area of smaller mounds extends further west and are believed to represent lesser residential districts of the city.

The area to the east of the city drops away rapidly and lacks extensive settlement remains, perhaps due to periodic flooding by the Mopan and Salsipuedes rivers discouraging the occupation of the eastern zone.

=== Acropolis ===
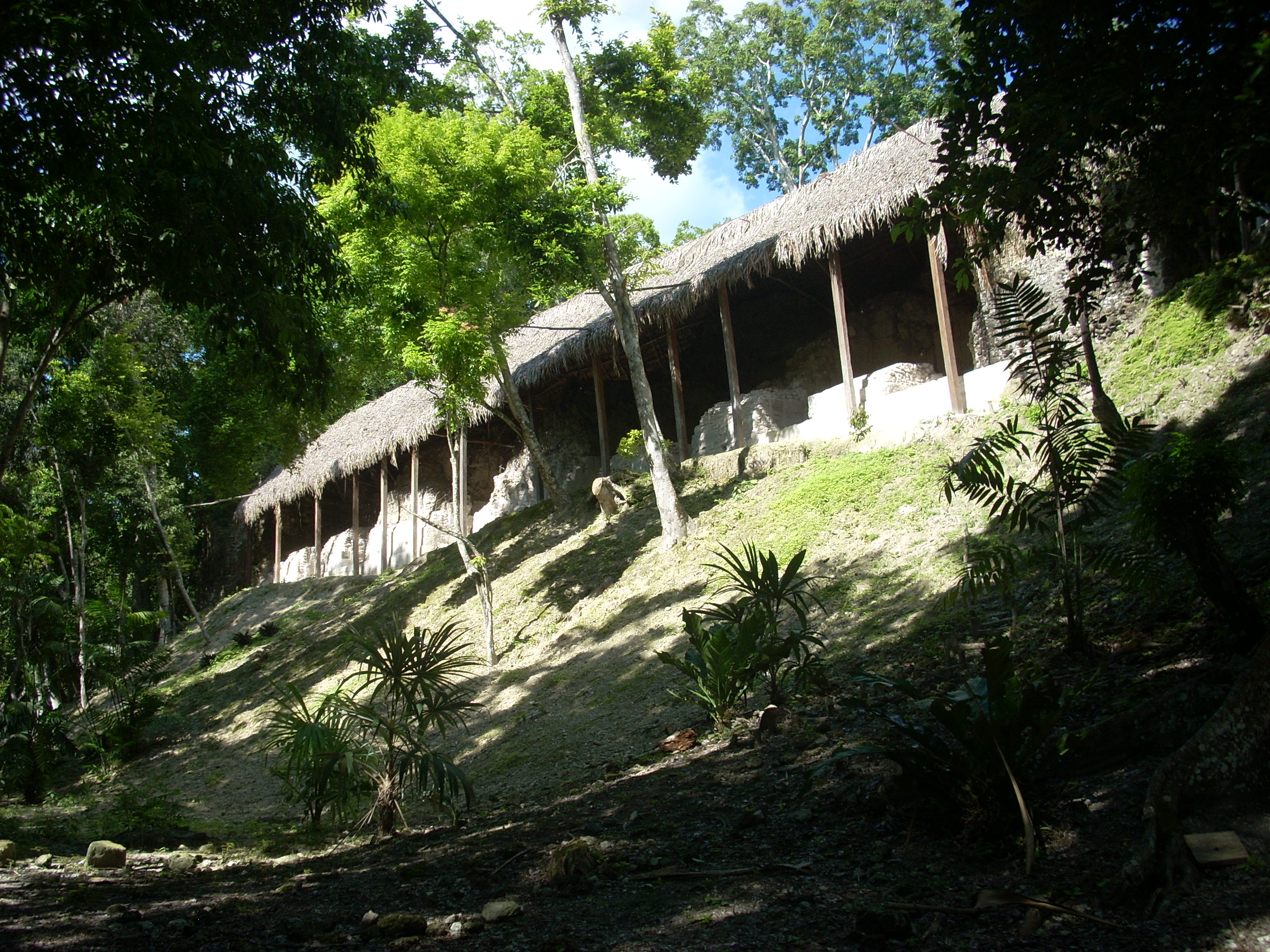
Outer west side of the acropolis

The most important architectural complex is the acropolis, a palace with an enclosed courtyard located within the Great North Plaza. The acropolis is also known as the Quadrangle due to its layout. A series of terraces lead down from the acropolis to a 1,500-square-metre (16,000 sq ft) reservoir to the south, which appears to have been a private water source for the palace. The reservoir itself is now dried out. The acropolis was accessed via a wide stairway from the Great North Plaza. The form of the plaza and the acropolis are unusual, although similar complexes have been identified at Nojpetén, Ixlu and Kinal.

Excavations in the acropolis revealed the presence of at least two superimposed platforms built with finely dressed stone blocks and covered with good quality stucco flooring. At a later date the platforms and courtyard were covered with unworked stones bound with mortar and covered with another stucco floor. The two platforms were built in the Late Classic and appear to have been covered over in the Terminal Classic.

The interior courtyard measures approximately 36 metres (118 ft) on each side and was completely enclosed by the palace, creating a very private space within. The buildings on the north, west and south sides faced outwards away from the private courtyard, opening onto it only via a central doorway in each structure. The eastern structure was built at a later date, has two lateral doorways and was the only side to face directly onto the courtyard; it highly may have been the residence of the city's ruler. Entrance to the courtyard is from the exterior the acropolis via these central doorways on the north, south and west sides. Of these three entrances, the northern entrance appears to have been the main entrance to the acropolis complex. The south entrance was a more private entrance that opened from the acropolis onto the terraces leading down to the water source in that direction. The western entrance lead to the terrace 5 metres (16 ft) above the causeway, providing a balcony with an excellent view across the city.

The cut stone walls of the acropolis are of very high quality, constructed of large, finely cut blocks at times forming walls almost 2 metres (6.6 ft) thick, filled with rubble and mortar. The exterior faces of the walls are carefully dressed and the interior of good quality vaulted ceilings. Although such high quality work can be found in parts of major cities such as Tikal, its presence in a smaller site such as La Blanca is considered surprising by archaeologists. The walls facing the interior courtyard have been especially well preserved. During survey work at the acropolis, archaeologists discovered a 13.5-centimetre (5.3 in) long flint knife deliberately embedded in the interior of the north wall, it weighed 225 grams (7.9 oz). The knife was embedded in the mortar of the infill with the blade pointing outwards, with three embedded decorations near the tip. Archaeologists believe the blade was deposited during rituals associated with the construction of the building.

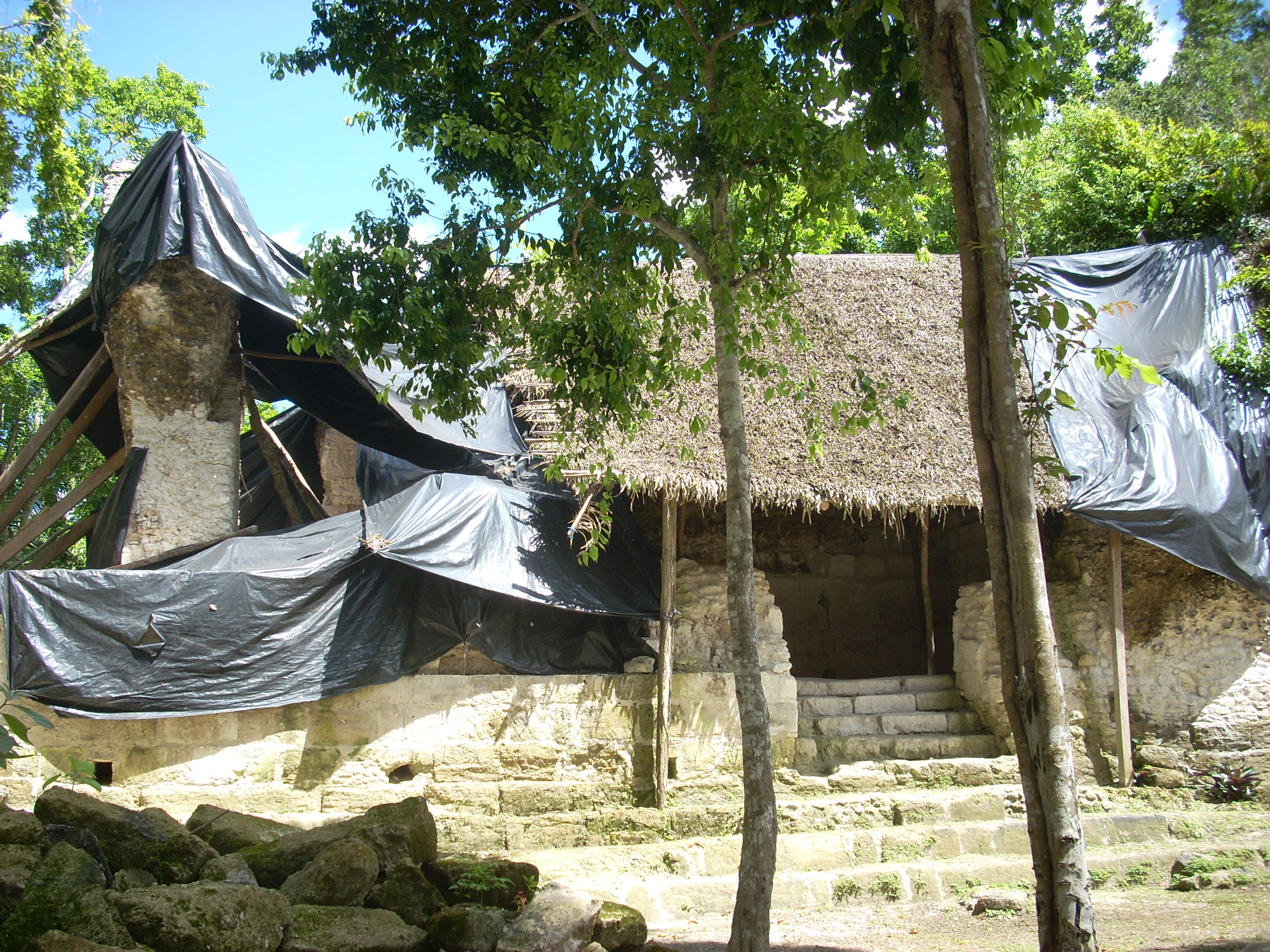
The west (inner) side of the east range of the acropolis, believed to be the royal apartments

The outer eastern wall of the acropolis is especially well preserved, including a cornice 3.8 metres (12 ft) above the floor level of the building, which is 4 to 5 metres (13 to 16 ft) above the plaza floor. The wall continued above the cornice for another 3 metres (9.8 ft) and this section probably supported a stucco frieze. The entire eastern face of the building measured 32 metres (105 ft) long and stood 12 to 13 metres (39 to 43 ft) above the level of the Great North Plaza. This wall was completely blank, without any doorways or other openings.

The range structures on the other sides of the courtyards, all opening outwards away from it, consisted of a series of rooms of varying size. The height of the rooms from the palace floor to the top of the vaulting was generally about 6 metres (20 ft) throughout the palace. The interior walls were originally painted red and black as demonstrated by surviving traces of pigment. The exterior facades of the range structures were originally decorated with sculpted stone friezes representing supernatural beings, fragments of which have been found amongst the collapsed rubble.

The vaulted ceilings of the palace were skillfully constructed, with sides of equal length unlike in other sites in the Petén region where the sides of vaulted ceilings were often of different lengths. The vaulting is of exceptional height, reaching up to 4 metres (13 ft).

==== South range ====
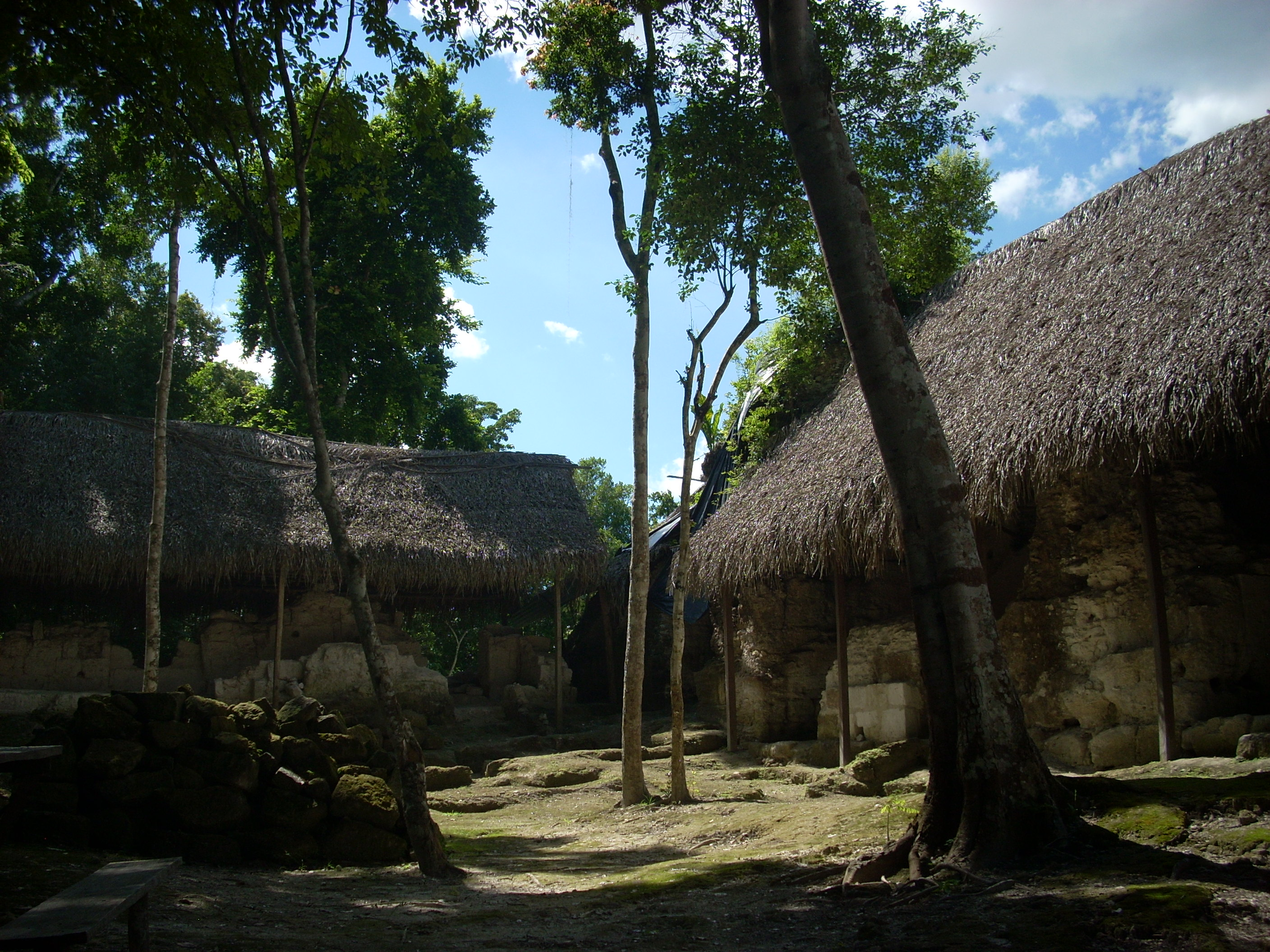
The south side of the south range of the acropolis, with adjoining structure at left

The south range measures 42 metres (138 ft) long and divides the courtyard from the series of terraces to the south. The rooms of the south range include wide benches running their entire width, they measure 0.75 metres (2.5 ft) high and still preserve their original stucco covering. The bench in Room 1 has a small step leading up to it. The walls of the rooms are relatively poorly preserved, although some parts still retain their stucco covering and traces of pigment, as well as inscribed graffiti. The lintels over the doors were crafted from sapodilla wood. Some of the south-facing rooms have twin, symmetrically placed doorways, a style of architecture that is very unusual for a range structure in the Petén region. Examples are known from minor structures at Tikal but the closest corresponding architecture comes from the Puuc region of the northern Yucatán Peninsula, at cities such as Cacabxnuc, Chelemi, Xcorralche and Xkalachetzimin, although they differ in other particulars, such as the vaulting.

Excavations immediately south of the south range uncovered part of a substructure consisting of a well-preserved stucco-covered talud wall and a stairway, these are thought to be the remains of a terrace platform. A portion of a second terrace talud wall was also uncovered.

=== West Group ===
Investigations of the West Group have revealed an occupation beginning in the Late Classic and reaching its maximum extent in the Terminal Classic. The construction methods used in the West Group were inferior to those of the acropolis, consisting of finely cut limestone blocks bound with an earth-based mortar rather than the lime-based mortar used in the palace complex. The platforms of the West Group appear to have supported perishable superstructures and some of these buildings may have been dedicated to craft production.

The three main plazas of the West Group appear to have lacked stucco flooring and were instead covered with stone chippings.

Mound 1

The site had the highest pyramid in the Pacific Lowlands at 25 meters high (Mound 1). It was built c. 900 BC, and was one of the first pyramidal temples in Mesoamerica, measuring 150 x 90m at its base.

=== South Group ===
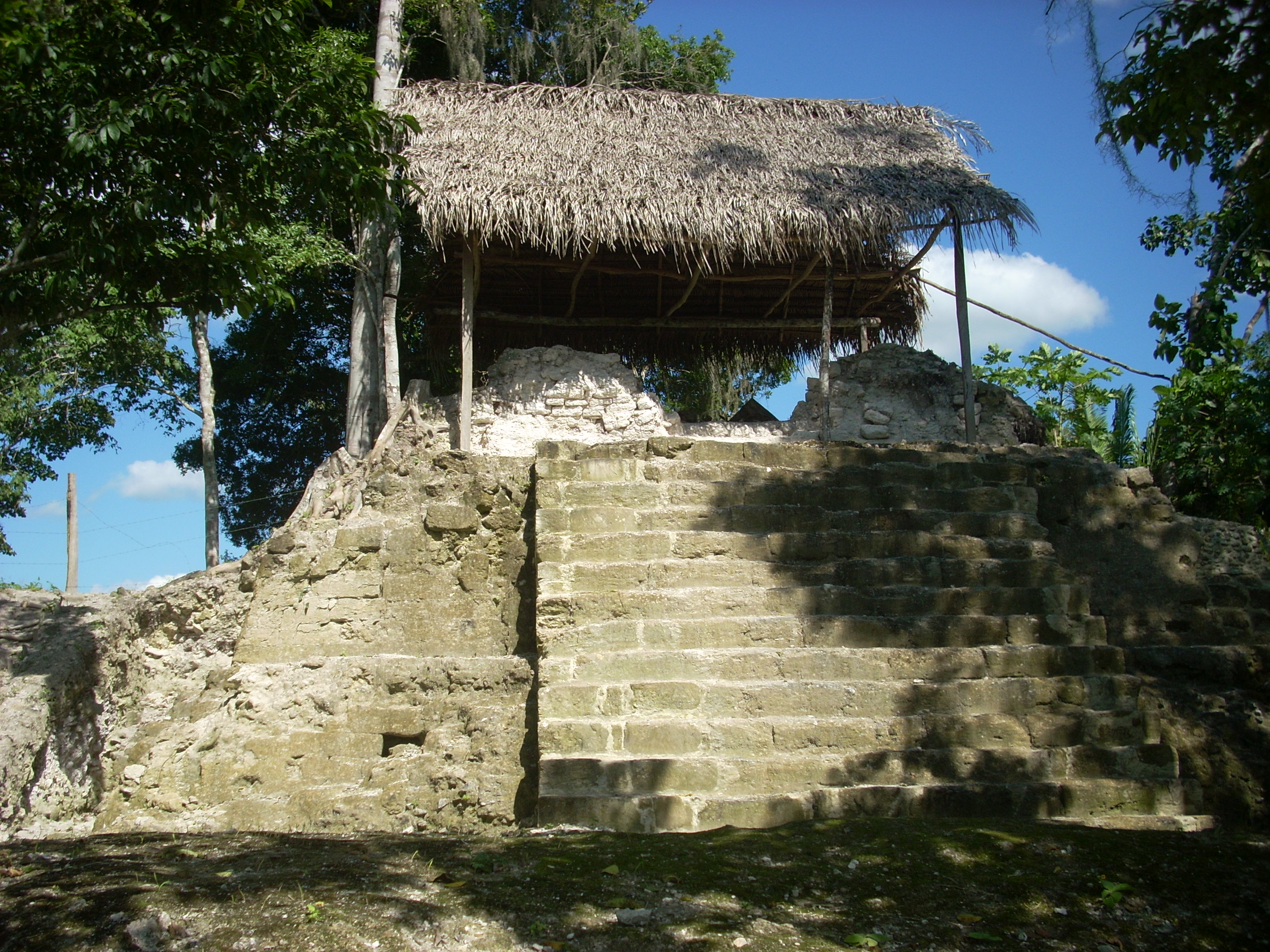
Pyramid in the South Group

The South Group is the furthest group from the centre to possess monumental architecture. The South Group is the oldest architectural group at La Blanca, with occupation dating as far back as the Early Classic. It has a slightly different orientation to the rest of the site, apparently due to its earlier construction. It consists of number of medium-sized mounds that have been badly damaged by looters. The larger of the mounds are pyramids and there were also a number of other buildings. One of the mounds measures approximately 9 metres (30 ft) high and was almost cut in half by a looters' trench. Rescue operations uncovered ceramic remains dating to the Late Classic, including a piece bearing a fragment of hieroglyphic text.

Excavations in 2008 revealed that one of these mounds was a temple pyramid with a well-preserved central stairway.

Monument 3

Basin-like quatrefoil sculpture at La Blanca (Monument 3). Diameter 2.1m

Monument 3 was discovered in La Blanca Mound 9, in a residential zone thought to be largely or completely elite. Excavations of the mound initially revealed domestic features such as floors, burials.

Monument 3 is unique in Mesoamerican archaeology. Found on the western slope of the mound, it consists of a sculpture in the shape of a quatrefoil. It was formed of rammed earth, or sandy loam. The rammed earth was then coated with dark brown (nearly black) clay. The inner rim of the sculpture was painted with hematite red. The monument is 2.1 m in diameter

The La Blanca quatrefoil has a channel within the rim that probably carried water to the interior basin. The initial hypothesis is that the sculpture functioned as a locus of ritual in which water, or notions of fertility, were invoked. Such an idea is consistent with the quatrefoil shape, which in the Classic period iconography symbolizes a watery portal to the supernatural realm. Dating to approximately 850 B.C., the La Blanca sculpture appears to be the earliest example of a quatrefoil known in Mesoamerica. The inclination of the external rings, the presence of the channel, as well as the concavity of the basin all suggest that Monument 3 was meant to contain liquid. Fluid would flow into the centre of the basin. The use of water-filled basins in Preclassic-period Oaxaca provides a useful parallel, because such rituals were employed in rites of divination.

== Graffiti ==
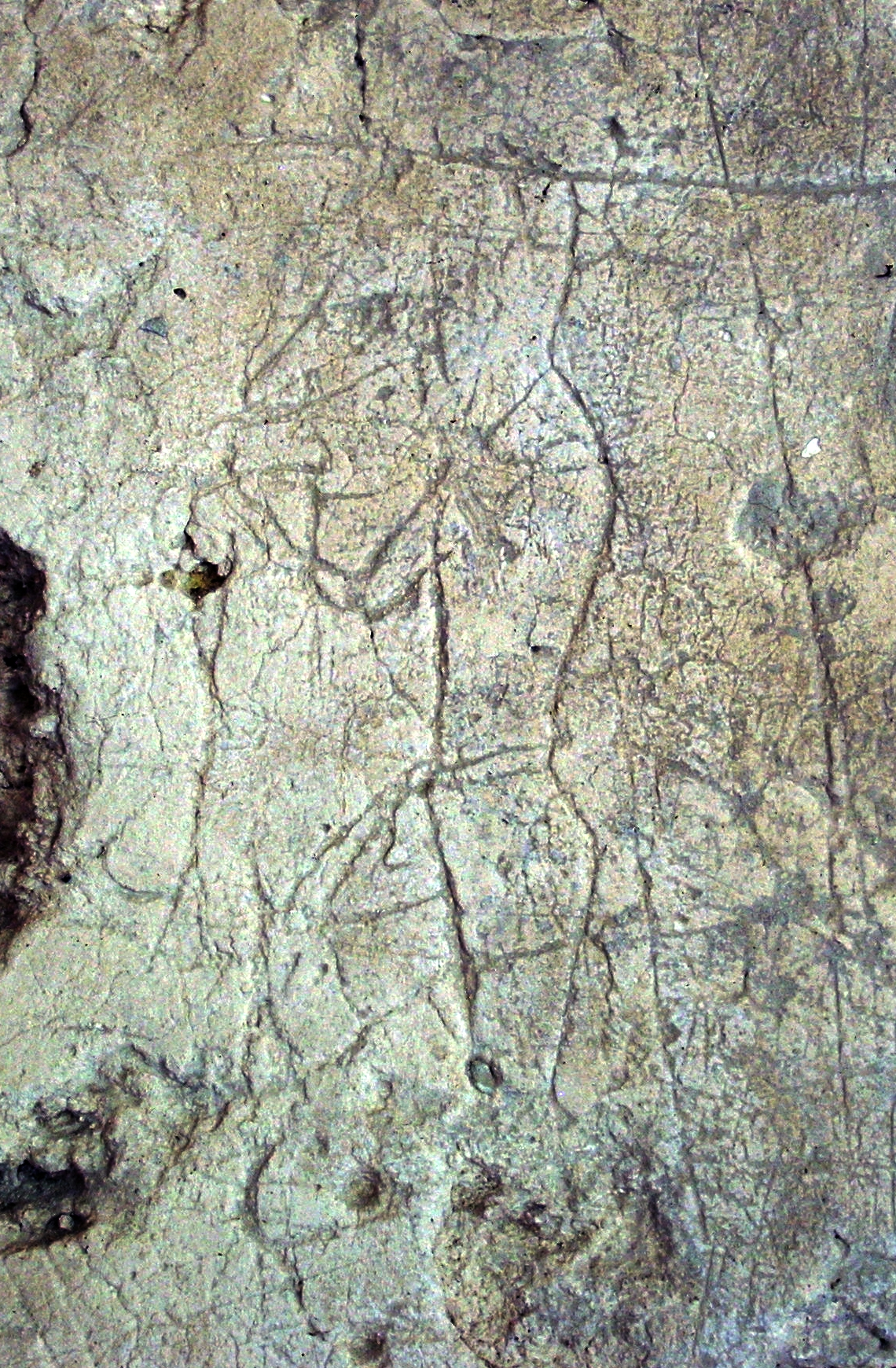
Graffito of a flute player

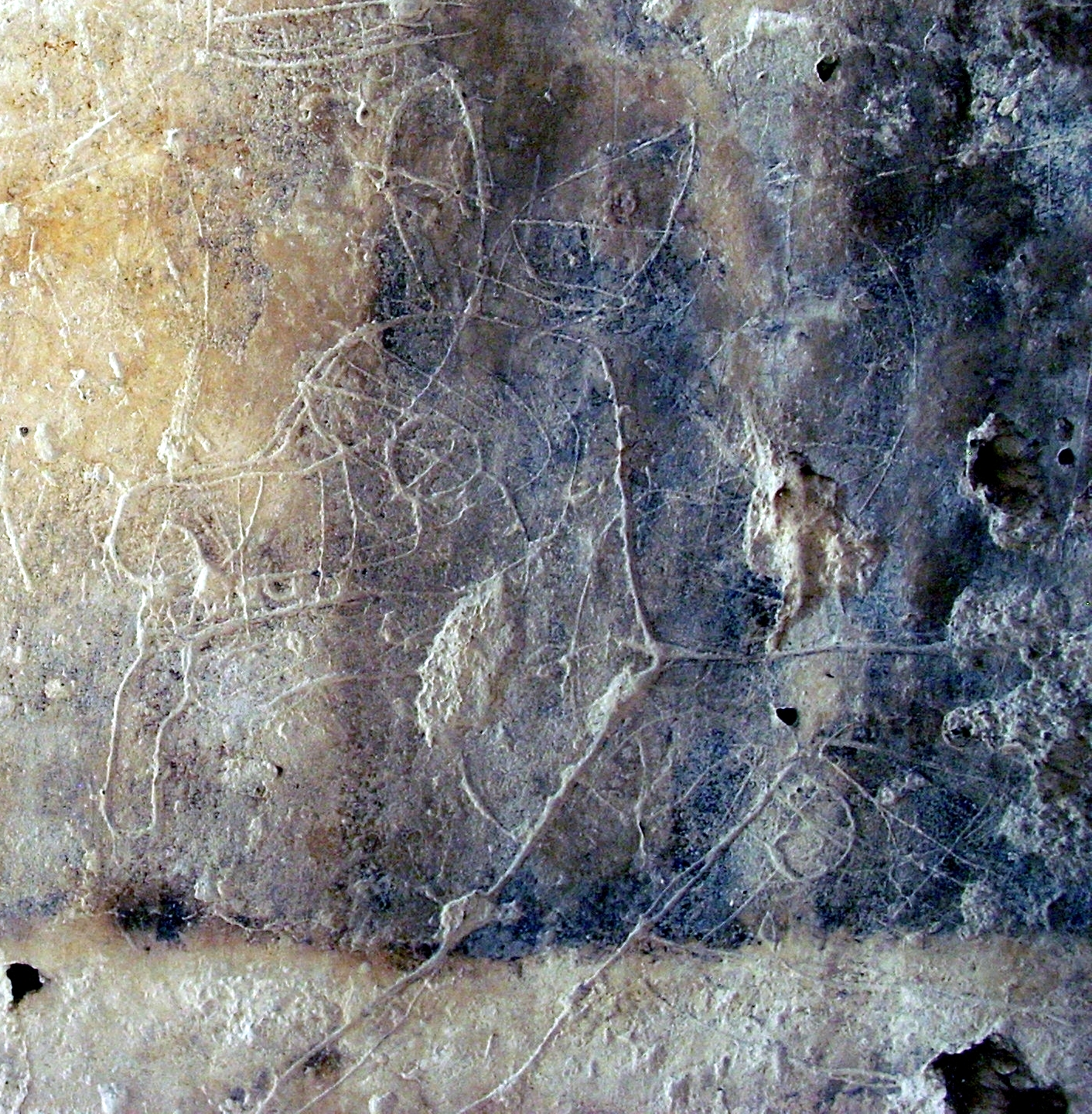
Graffito of a deer

The acropolis is also distinguished by a great quantity of graffiti inscribed onto the stucco interior walls of its rooms, some of which display a considerable level of artistic skill. The graffiti is believed to date to the last phase of occupation of the acropolis, during the Early Postclassic, and includes local fauna and human figures, some of which are playing musical instruments. Animals depicted in the graffiti include a deer, a turtle and a frog. Two human figures are depicted playing flutes, while other subjects include pyramid temples, courtly scenes, vulvas and supernatural beings.

Analysis of pigment traces from the south range of the acropolis were carried out by the Polytechnic University of Valencia, they revealed a preference for mineral and vegetable pigments of local origin, perhaps collected from the nearby El Camalote hill.

== Artefacts ==
Many of the artefacts excavated from the acropolis date from the transition from the Terminal Classic Period to the Early Postclassic, when the surrounding population appears to have occupied the abandoned palace. Excavations of the south range of the acropolis uncovered a great many potsherds (roughly 11,000) dating to the Terminal Classic, and about 150 pieces dating to the Early Postclassic. In the same building 150 stone artefacts were excavated together with hundreds of fragments of waste chippings. Fifteen incomplete ceramic figurines were also found, including zoomorphic figures and elite human figures with elaborate headdresses. One of these figurines was a whistle in the shape of an owl, identical to another found in an excavated rubbish heap in the acropolis courtyard. Both of these owl-shaped whistles are very similar to a larger whistle found at Yaxha. A number of artefacts were recovered from the threshold of Room 3 of the south range, including a complete terminal classic ceramic vessel, a flint knife, some broken figurine fragments and some lithic fragments. In the area of the threshold of Room 4 in the south range a complete Early Postclassic tripod plate was recovered. Within Room 4 itself were found a further 70 broken pieces of Terminal Classic ceramics and 232 pieces dated to the Early Postclassic, and a greenstone axe among other finds. Many of the Postclassic fragments were from a tripod pitcher with zoomorph supports that archaeologists were largely able to reconstruct. Additionally, 798 Terminal Classic ceramic fragments were found during the exploration of the terraces immediately south of the acropolis, together with stone chippings and pieces of animal bones.

Pits sunk within the courtyard of the acropolis revealed 5425 ceramic fragments, 22 fragments of zoomorphic figurines, together with stone and shell artefacts, animal bones and waste flint chips, all dated to the Terminal Classic.

Analysis of artefacts from La Blanca has revealed an unusual and almost total absence of obsidian, while flint of various colours (including red, pink, orange, brown, cream and grey) is particularly common.

== Burials ==
A human burial was found in Room 3 of the south range of the Acropolis. The remains were found lying on their right side facing towards the west, with arms bent. Preliminary investigation suggests that the remains are those of a young adult male with a height of approximately 1.6 metres (5.2 ft). The left hand side of the skull is deformed, perhaps as a result of either oxycephaly or plagiocephaly.

La Blanca figurines

Abundance of hand-modeled ceramic figurines have been found at La Blanca. A series of figurines from La Blanca bear the puffy facial features associated with the Potbelly sculpture tradition, as well as with the massive heads of the Monte Alto culture. Some of the figurines have facial features that anticipate those of the Monte Alto heads and potbellies, including the closed eyes with puffy lids and swollen cheeks.
