= Ancient Maya graffiti =

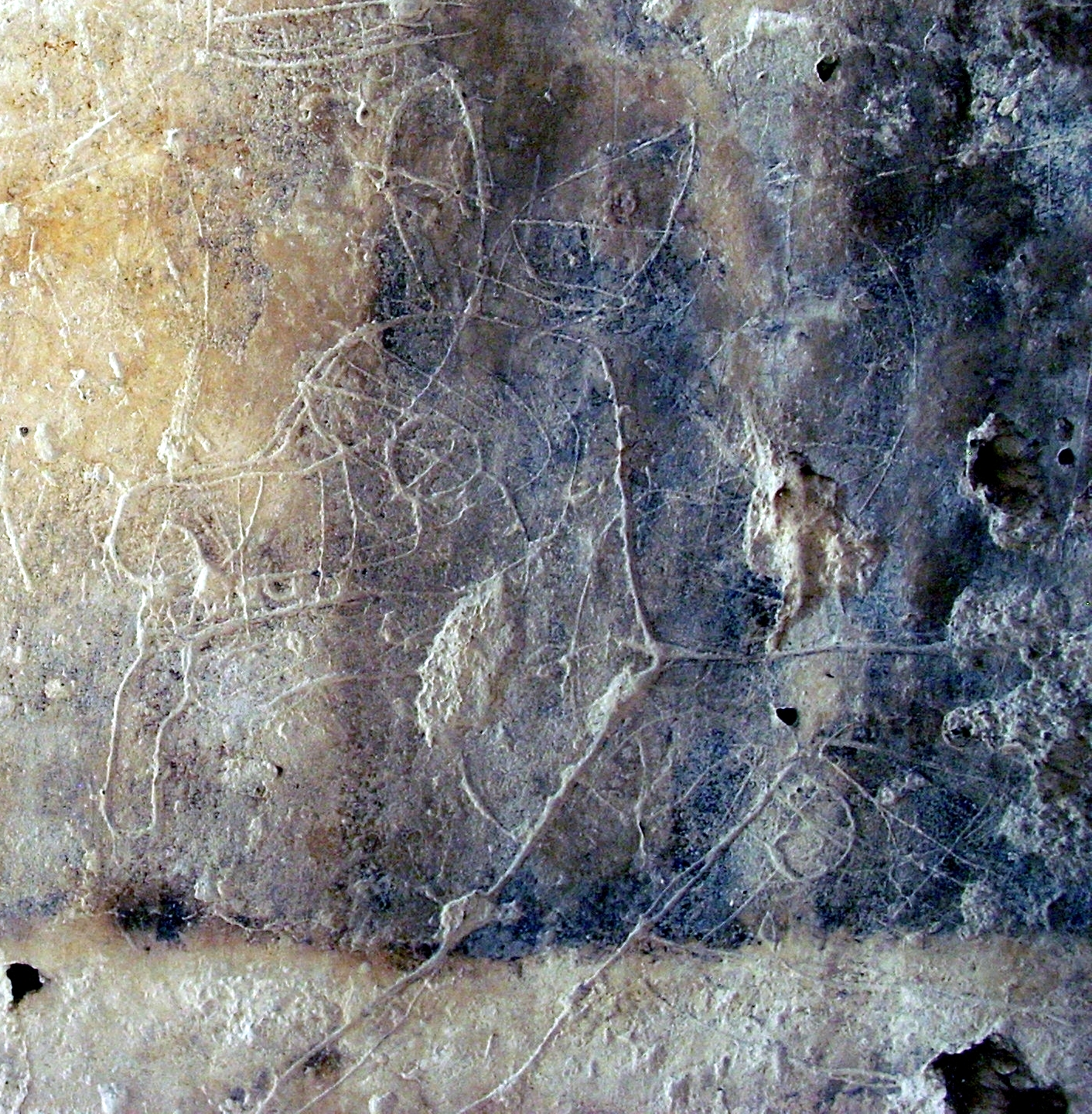
Graffito of a deer at La Blanca, Peten

Ancient Maya graffiti are a little-studied area of folk art of the pre-Columbian Maya civilization. Graffiti were incised into the stucco of interior walls, floors, and benches, in a wide variety of buildings, including pyramid-temples, residences, and storerooms. Graffiti have been recorded at over 50 Maya sites, particularly clustered in the Petén Basin and southern Campeche, and the Chenes region of northwestern Yucatán. At Tikal, where a great quantity of graffiti have been recorded, the subject matter includes drawings of temples, people, deities, animals, banners, litters, and thrones. Graffiti were often inscribed haphazardly, with drawings overlapping each other, and display a mix of crude, untrained art, and examples by artists who were familiar with Classic-period (c. 250–950 AD) artistic conventions.

Maya graffiti are usually difficult to date. Many have been attributed to the Late Classic (c. AD 550–830) and Terminal Classic (c. 830–950) periods, although earlier graffiti are known. Some graffiti have been attributed to squatters in the Postclassic period (c. 950–1539).

Graffiti are not integral decoration of the structures where they are found; rather, they are additions to pre-existing features, and lack formal organisation. Usually they bear no obvious relationship to any neighbouring graffiti, and they can be found randomly scattered on walls, floors, and benches. Some examples are found in obscure locations, such as dark corners and narrow passageways.

Maya graffiti are a poorly studied topic; early explorers and investigators regarded them as a curiosity with little bearing on Classic Maya culture. In the late 19th century, Teoberto Maler became the first person to record Maya graffiti. A few 20th-century scholars made efforts to record additional examples of graffiti. By the later part of the 20th century, graffiti had been recorded at San Clemente, Chichen Itza, Hochob, Holmul, Nakum, Santa Rosa Xtampak, Tikal, and Uaxactún.

== Geographical extent ==
Graffiti have been recorded at sites across the entire Maya area. In the Río Bec region of Campeche, in the southern Yucatán Peninsula, the exceptional preservation of standing architecture has resulted in the preservation of a considerable amount of graffiti. Río Bec graffiti are found in all classes of masonry residences, from simple single-room structures to multi-room palaces. An early 21st-century survey of the Río Bec region discovered 464 graffiti in just 15 of the buildings surveyed.

== Subject matter ==
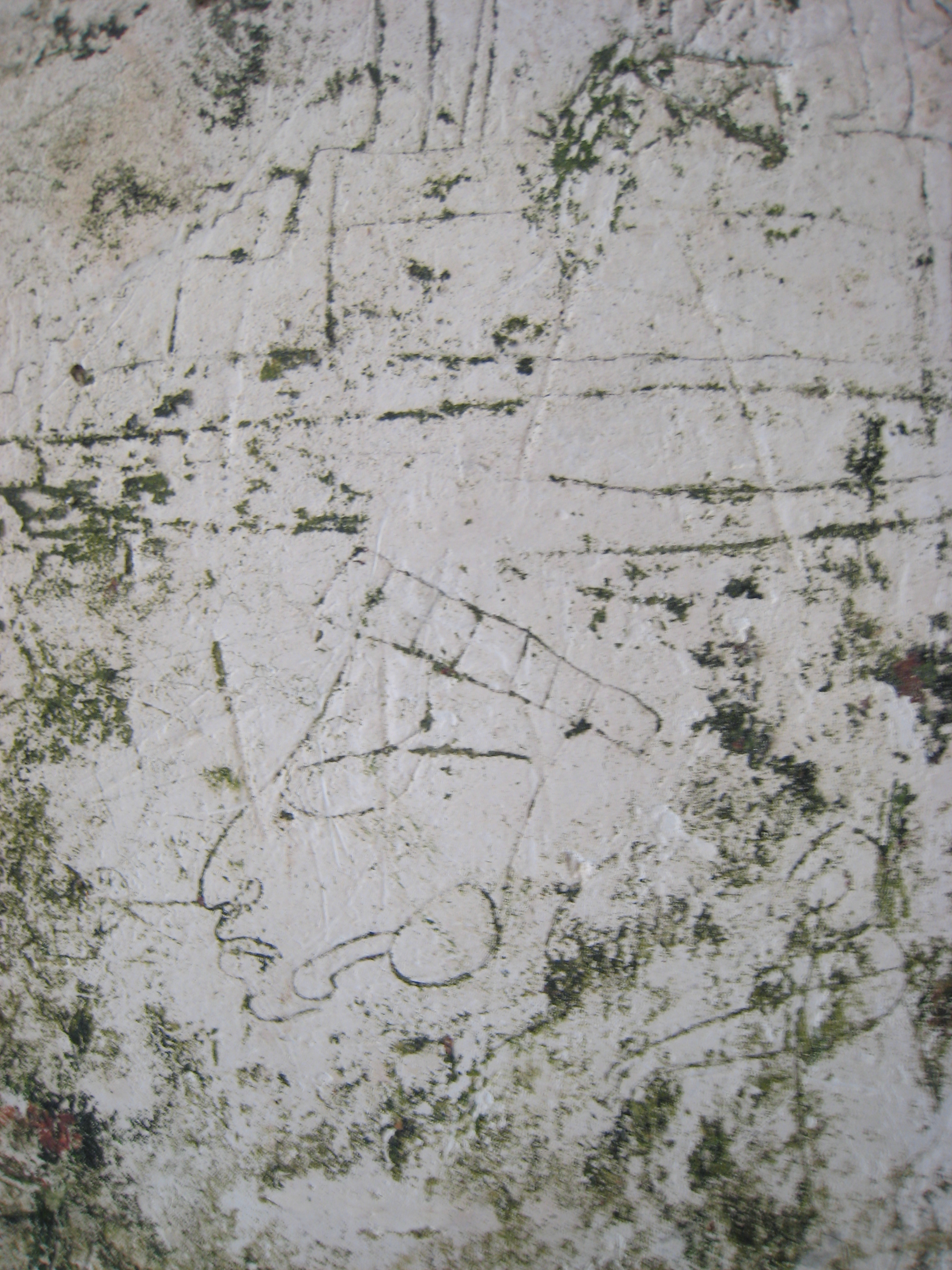
Human head from Tikal

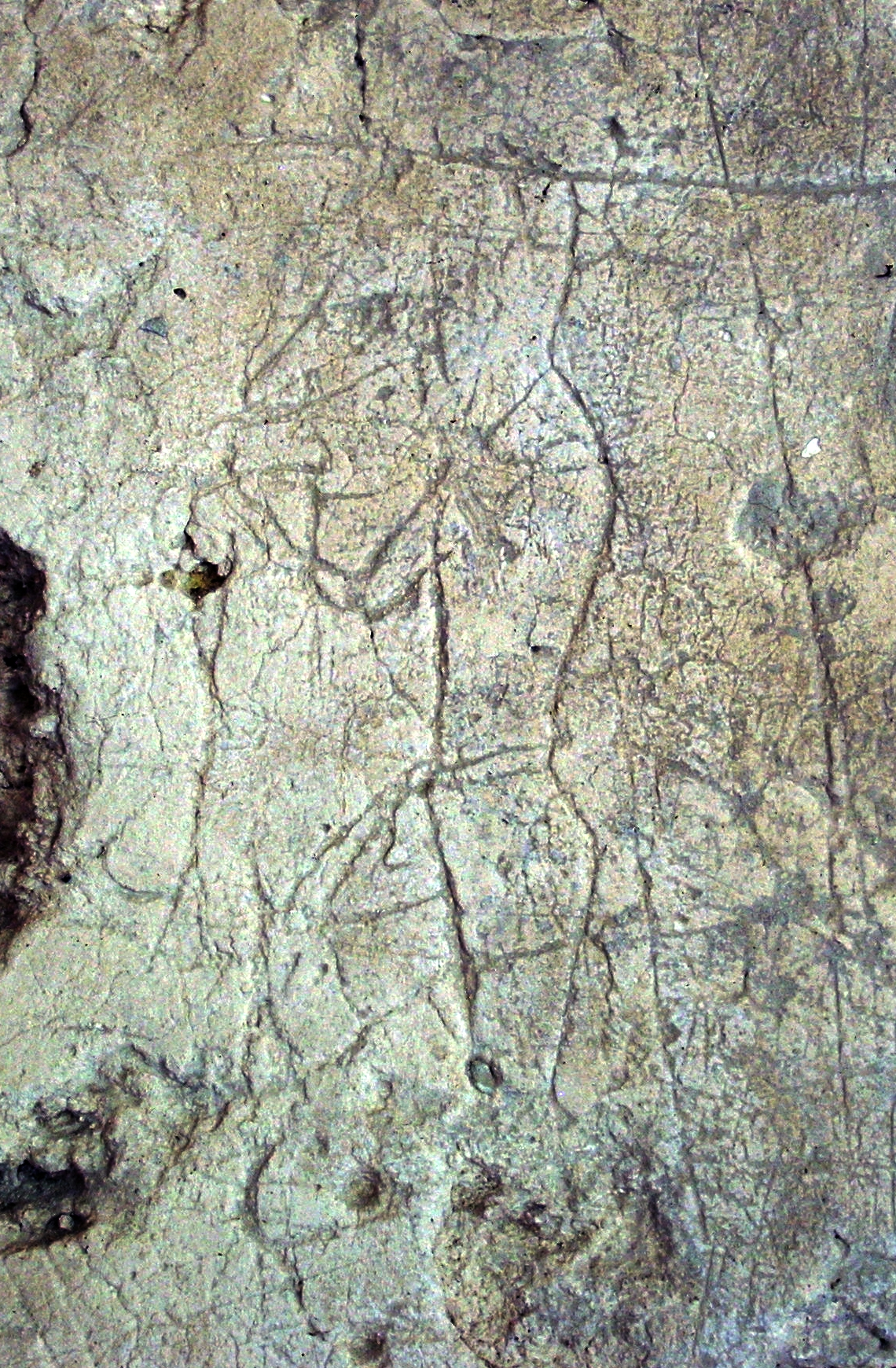
Flute player from La Blanca

Ancient Maya graffiti portray a wide variety of themes from ancient Maya life, from the everyday to high ceremony, and are now regarded as an important source providing insight into ancient Maya society; subjects appear to be those witnessed by the artist.

There are a large number of geometrical and abstract designs among Maya graffiti, and some scribbles. Among those examples that represent an identifiable subject, there is wide variation. Designs include whole human figures, anthropomorphic figures, human heads, buildings, deities, human sacrifice, animals (including birds, insects, and snakes), ceremonial ballcourts, patolli boards, and hieroglyphs. Usually each graffito is unrelated to surrounding designs, although in rare instances they can form a larger scene. A notable example of this is at Tikal Temple II; it depicts a scene of human sacrifice. A couple of procession scenes are depicted in buildings at Tikal, and some group scenes are known from Río Bec. The most commonly represented subjects are human figures and heads. At Río Bec, warlike imagery is lacking, although there are scenes of human sacrifice.

At Río Bec, complex representations of ceremonial scenes form compositions that can measure up to 2.5 metres (8.2 ft) in length. Much Río Bec graffiti is concerned with the elite residents, but additional graffiti, apparently added by squatters after the residences were abandoned, incorporate new subject matter that included mythological beings and female imagery.

Graffiti varies widely in quality, from crude drawings described variously as childlike or cartoonish, to skillfully executed renderings of human figures and animals that are of comparable quality to formal Classic Maya art. Most examples fall somewhere between the two in terms of quality. Recognisable content in graffiti generally falls within those topics associated with Classic period Maya art.

== Authorship ==
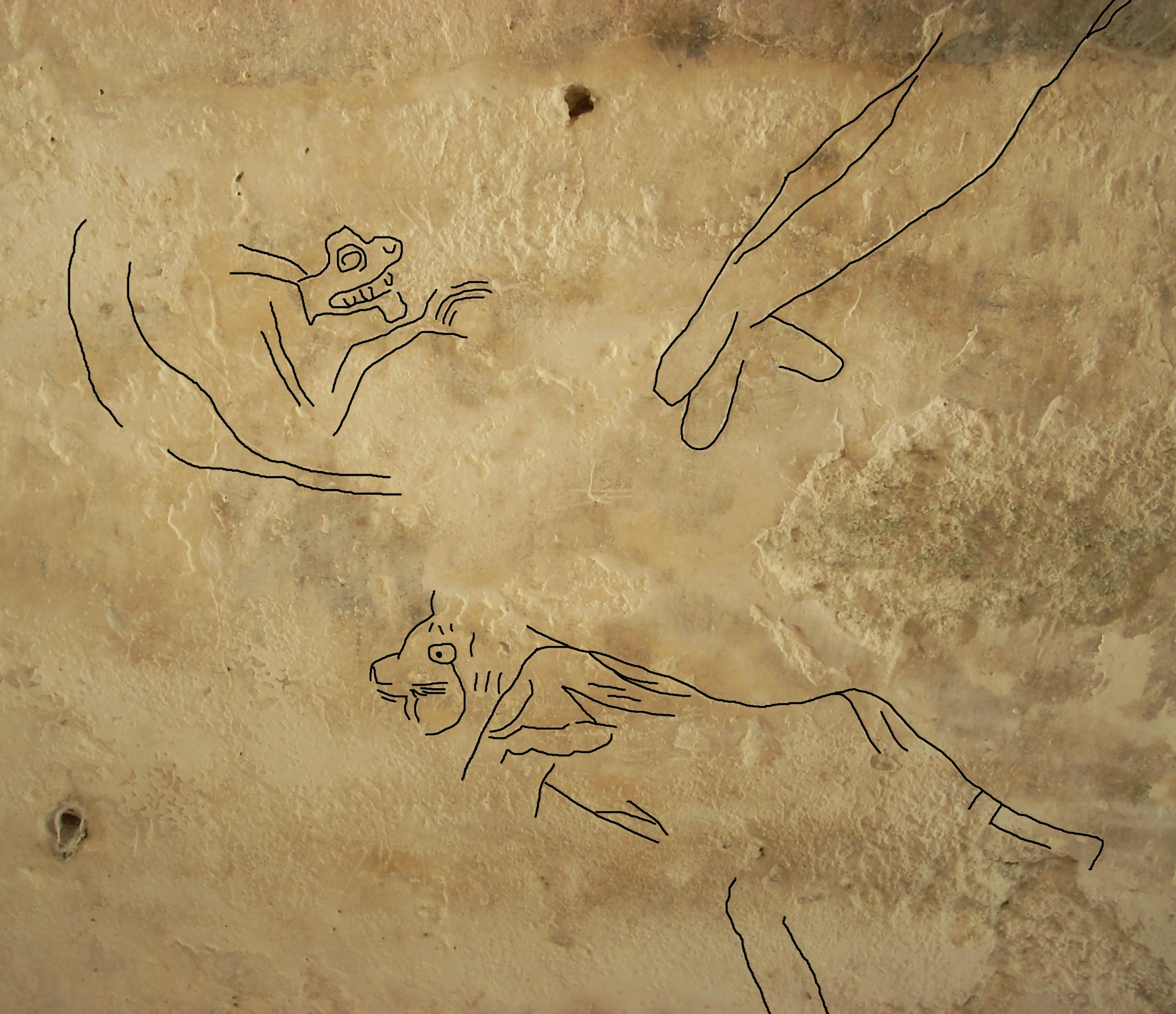
Zoomorphic graffiti at La Blanca, Petén. Incised lines overwritten in black for clarity.

Early opinions on Maya graffiti were that they represented the crude scrawls of Postclassic squatters in Classic-period ruins. Later investigators, such as George F. Andrews, regarded graffiti as folk art produced by the Classic Maya elite in their own residences and workplaces. Three pairs of graffiti found both at Río Bec and Holmul (sites separated by over 130 kilometres (81 mi)), with similar quality, and technique, possess such similarity in design, down to the smallest details, that they are almost certain to be the product of the same untrained Late Classic artist. The three designs found at both sites consist of a seated person in a canopied litter being carried by two porters, an intricate geometrical symbol, and a seated figure blowing a wind instrument.

Preliminary studies indicate that most ancient Maya graffiti were executed by members of the Late Classic elite class, in their own residences and workplaces, and that most of the authors of graffiti were not trained artists. The restricted geographical extent of the majority of Maya graffiti seem to indicate that the practice became socially accepted within the Maya aristocracy, and was transmitted between sites by the Maya elite. At Río Bec, such is the abundance and differing quality of graffiti that all inhabitants, both adults and children, may have inscribed graffiti during the period of inhabitation.

Arguments for a Postclassic date for graffiti at Classic period sites are mainly based on the quality of graffiti, which does not correspond in most cases to that of formal Classic Maya art. Theories attributing a Postclassic origin to such graffiti are based on the idea that it was produced by squatters who intended to desecrate Classic period ruins. Although much Río Bec graffiti was produced during residential occupation, additional graffiti appears to have been inscribed by squatters after abandonment.

== Technique ==
Maya graffiti were scratched onto the targeted surface using some kind of pointed tool. Stucco surfaces at Maya sites are extremely hard, and incising graffiti was technically difficult. Basic lines and curves were relatively easy to mark, but complex curves and delicately etched lines were difficult to produce. The nature of the medium is such that mistakes are non-correctable; lines could not be erased, only added. Nonetheless, there are a large number of competently executed drawings.

== Purpose ==
The purpose of ancient Maya graffiti is a matter of debate. Opinions vary from them being a desecration of their containing building, to instructive drawings, personal records, and byproducts of magic. Most graffiti with an identifiable subject appear to relate to elite activity. Graffiti of patolli gameboards are almost always found on horizontal surfaces, indicating that they were used to play the game. Haviland and Haviland applied a neuropsychological model to the interpretation of graffiti at Tikal and argue that from 66% to 90% of graffiti at the city conform to what would be expected from art produced during a trance state.

== Dating ==
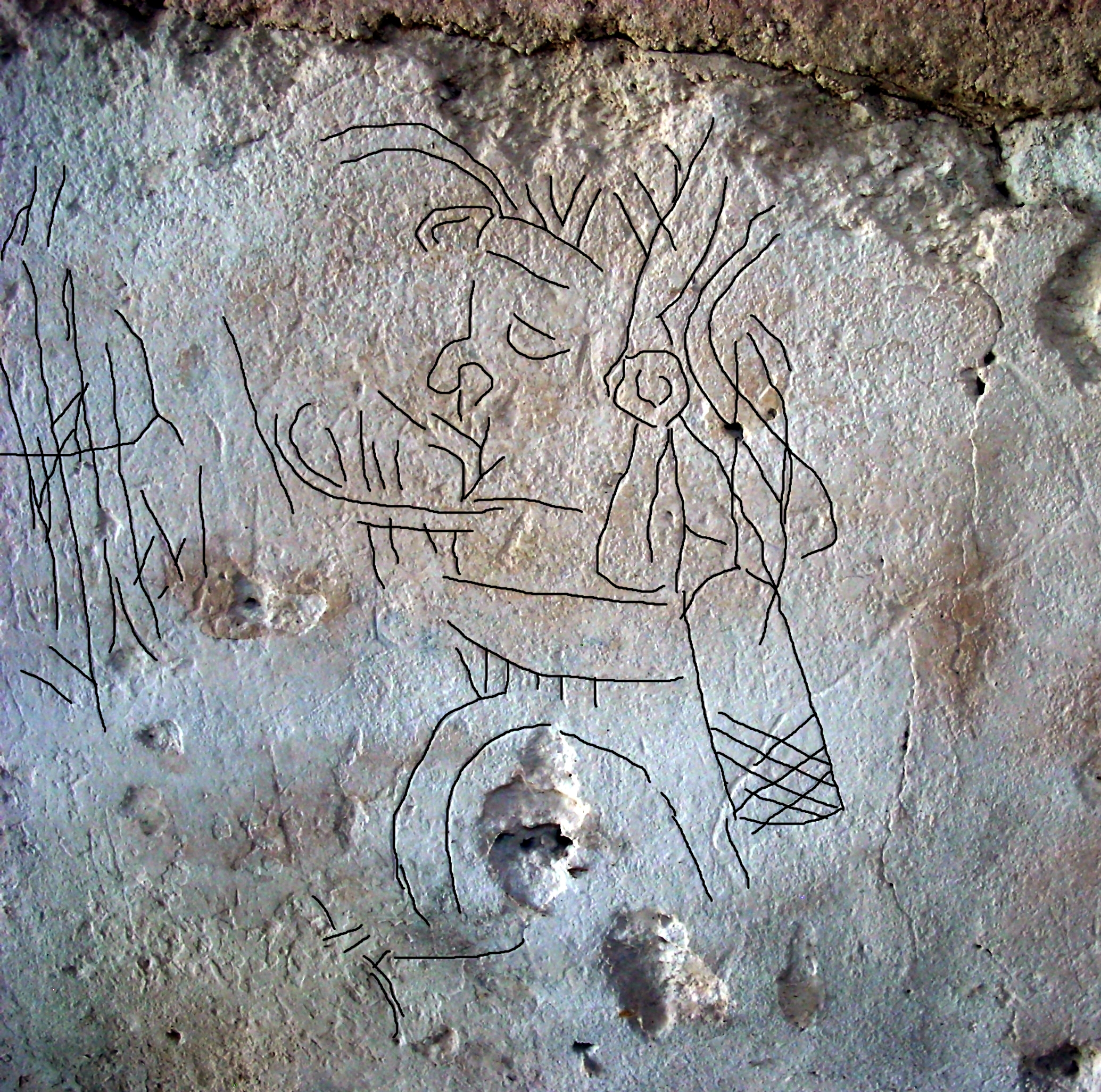
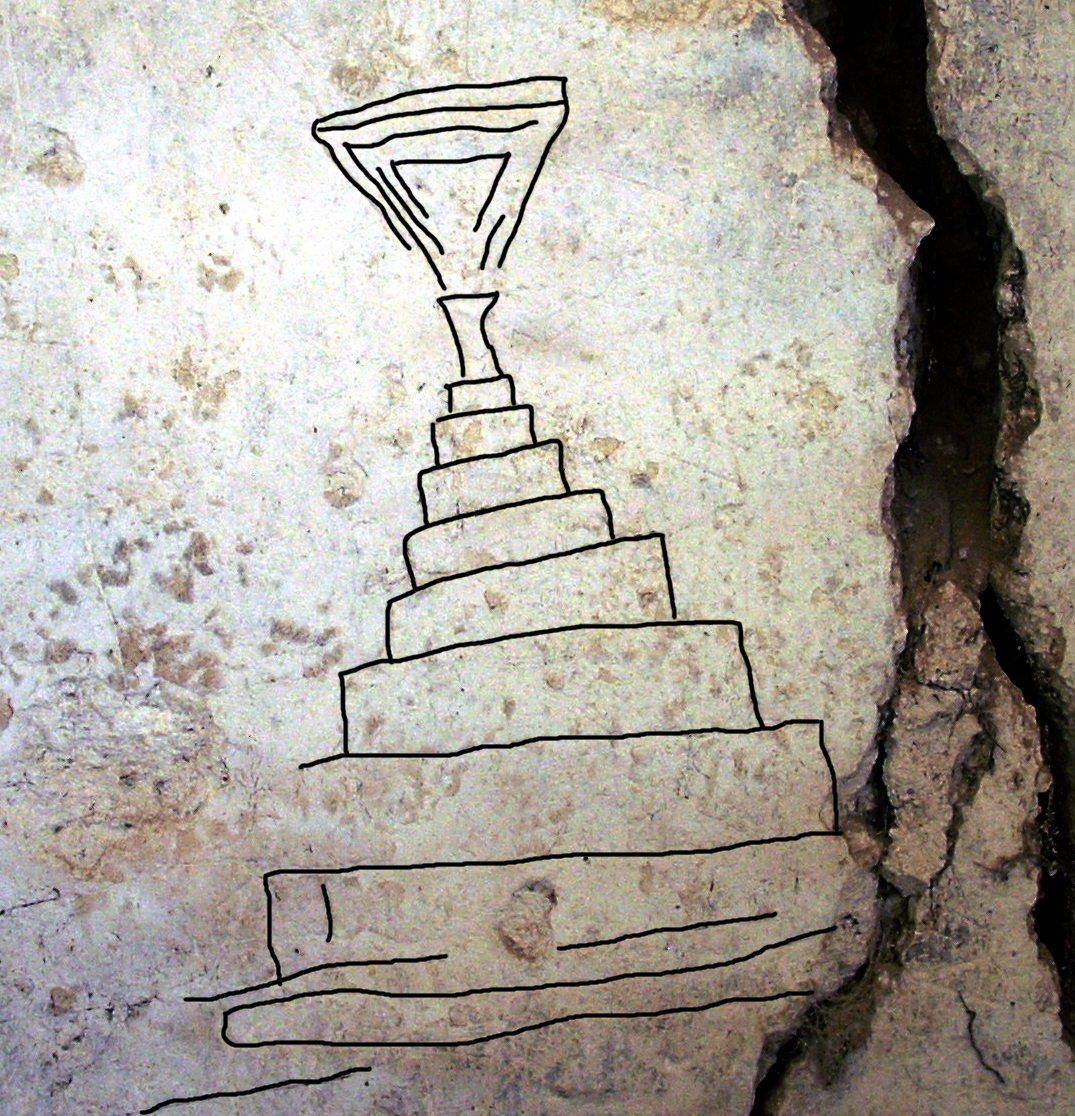
Graffiti at La Blanca with scored lines digitally overwritten in black for clarity

Ancient Maya graffiti are difficult to date, since they could have been added at any time since completion of the building where they are drawn. However, a number of graffiti have been excavated in sealed contexts, where they were drawn on early structures that were later completely covered by later buildings. At Tikal, this has resulted in the secure dating of graffiti to the Preclassic (c. 2000 BC – 250 AD), and Early to mid-Classic periods (c. 250 – 600 AD). Most graffiti at Tikal are contained in structures that date to the Late to Terminal Classic. Some examples of graffiti at Río Bec and Uaxactún may pre-date the Late Classic.

There is debate as to whether graffiti found in Late Classic structures were created by their Classic period inhabitants, or whether they were added in the Postclassic period. In the Central Acropolis of Tikal, benches were placed in two structures sometime between 650 and 750 AD, partially or wholly covering pre-existing graffiti. This would indicate a date no later than the early 8th century. The style and subject matter of additional graffiti not obscured by the addition of the benches indicate that they were roughly contemporaneous with the covered examples. Similarly, at Río Bec, graffiti was found to be sealed by later building modifications. At Uaxactún, incised graffiti were also painted red; the excavator interpreted this as signifying that the graffiti were created by the original residents, rather than later squatters or passers-by. At Tz'ibatnah, in northeastern Petén, a Late Classic structure was likewise sealed under later architecture; this contained a great number of graffiti associated with the elite occupants of the site.

In the majority of examples, where graffiti are not sealed by building modifications, it is not possible to confidently assign a date. However, there is no securely dated evidence of Postclassic graffiti being added to Late Classic structures.
