= Violet Pritchard =

British historian and writer (1899–1993)

- Born: Violet Bannerman; 2 May 1899
- Died: 20 October 1993 (aged 94); Cambridge, England
- Occupations: Historian, writer
- Notable work: English Medieval Graffiti (1967)

Violet Pritchard (née Bannerman; 2 May 1899 – 20 October 1993) was a British historian and writer who published the first full-length study in English of medieval graffiti.

== English Medieval Graffiti ==
Violet Pritchard published English Medieval Graffiti in 1967, the result of research undertaken predominantly in churches in and around Cambridge. The book was the first full-length work in English to be written on church graffiti, and became the key study for scholars and enthusiasts in the following decades. Although Pritchard herself, and scholars since, noted the shortcomings of the work, it is considered a groundbreaking study.

The book contained more than 200 rubbings illustrating the graffiti, and was described as demonstrating "the remarkable richness and variety of medieval drawings and inscriptions on the walls of churches".

In her introduction, Pritchard wrote:

The drawings are in some ways of greater interest than the inscriptions, for they invoke the past in a manner which no inscription could achieve. A picture arrests time and brings to life a lost moment in a century long past. Many of the drawings are hitherto unknown gems of medieval art: lost treasures refound, only to be lost again for ever if steps are not taken to preserve them.

Antonio Castillo Gómez has noted the significance of Pritchard's approach, suggesting that her "work staked a claim for the importance of writings and drawings on walls for our knowledge of the economy, social structure and way of life of a given place and time, and she treated them as historical sources".

== Notable works ==
- English Medieval Graffiti (Cambridge University Press, 1967)
