= Karl Sapper =

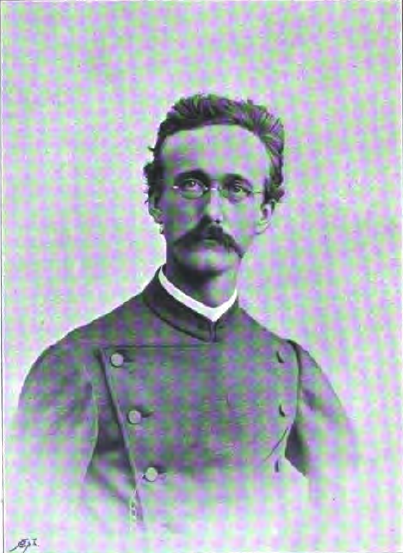
Dr Karl Sapper

Karl Theodor Sapper (6 February 1866 – 29 March 1945) was a German traveler, explorer, and antiquarian who is known for his research into the natural history, and cultures of Central America.

== Education ==
Sapper studied geology in Munich and showed a vivid interest in geography.

== Travel in Central America ==
In 1888 the young Sapper traveled to Guatemala, where his brother worked as a coffee planter. For two years Sapper managed a plantation, but he gave up this position because of ill health. However, in those two years Sapper learned three languages from the locals, as Spanish was not in common use. He also carried out topographic, and geological surveys, while pursuing his interest in ethnography, and archeology. After giving up the plantation work, Sapper moved to Cobán and with the financial support of his brother he was able to dedicate himself to scientific studies.

Sapper traveled throughout central America, and spent some time working as a geologist for the government of Mexico. Sapper's diaries are filled with his observations on geology, weather, vegetation, as well as the social and economic situation of the local people. He drew geological maps of central America, and a large topology of Guatemala. Sapper published and became accepted as authority on central America.

== Academic career in Germany ==
Sapper returned to Germany in 1900 aged 34, after 12 years in central America. He wrote his habilitation and was able to lecture at German universities. In 1902 Sapper was appointed professor of geography at the University of Tübingen, and in 1910 became professor at the University of Strasbourg. In 1919 he moved on to the University of Würzburg, becoming instrumental in establishing an institute of geography. He remained in this position until he retired in 1932.
