= Salinas River (Guatemala) =

Salinas river

Location
- Countries: Guatemala and Mexico

Physical characteristics
- Source
  - location: Guatemala (Huehuetenango, El Quiché)
- Mouth
  - location: Tributary of the Usumacinta river
- Length: 113 km (70 mi)
- Discharge
  - average: 555.1 m^{3}/s (19,600 cu ft/s)

The Salinas is a river in Guatemala. The river is called Río Negro from its sources (located at 15.270358°N 91.413717°W) in the highlands of Huehuetenango and El Quiché until it reaches the Chixoy hydroelectric dam (located at 15.281536°N 90.490952°W), where the Río Salama and Rio Carchela converge with the Río Negro. After the Chixoy dam, the river is called Río Chixoy and flows northwards through Alta Verapaz until it reaches the border with Mexico. It continues along the border for 113 kilometres (70 mi) as the Salinas river until it finally converges with the Río de la Pasión (at 16.481193°N 90.544167°W) to form the Usumacinta river which flows into the Gulf of Mexico.

Guatemala's National Institute for Electricity (INDE) is planning the construction of a new hydroelectric dam on the Chixoy river. The proposed location of the Xalalá hydroelectric dam is situated at 15.692833°N 90.786361°W. in the municipality of Ixcán, El Quiché.

== See also ==
- Río Negro Massacre
