= ADP =

ADP or Adp may refer to:

== Businesses and organizations ==
=== Businesses ===
- ADP (company), an American provider of human resources management software and services
- AD Plastik (ADP), Croatian manufacturer

=== Political organizations ===
==== United States ====
- Alabama Democratic Party
- Alaska Democratic Party
- American Democracy Project (AASCU initiative)
- American Democracy Project (Florida group)
- Arizona Democratic Party
- Arkansas Democratic Party

==== Elsewhere ====
- Action Democratic Party (Nigeria)
- Amhara Democratic Party, Ethiopia
- Arab Democratic Party (Israel)
- Arab Democratic Party (Lebanon)
- Assyrian Democratic Party, Syria
- Azerbaijan Democrat Party
- Azerbaijani Democratic Party

=== Other organizations ===
- Agua del Pueblo (AdP), a Guatemalan development organization
- Alpha Delta Phi (ΑΔΦ), a social college fraternal organization
- Alpha Delta Pi (ΑΔΠ), a college sorority organization
- Arbeitskreis der Pankreatektomierten (AdP), a German patient organisation for pancreatectomy
- Association for the Development of Pakistan, an American non-profit organization
- Association of Directory Publishers, an international trade organization
- California Department of Alcohol and Drug Programs

== Science and technology ==
=== Computing ===
- Acyclic dependencies principle, a software design principle
- Advanced Data Protection, Apple's end-to-end encryption option for iCloud
- Android Dev Phone, a device for Android developers
- Attach Detection Protocol, in the USB On-The-Go standard

=== Other uses in science and technology ===
- Adenosine diphosphate, an organic compound in metabolism
- Air displacement plethysmography, to measure human body composition
- Ammonium dihydrogen phosphate, a chemical compound

== Transportation ==
- Paris Aéroport, formerly Aéroports de Paris (ADP), operator of Paris airports
- Aeropuertos del Perú, airport operator in Peru
- Ampara Airport in Eastern Province, Sri Lanka, IATA airport code ADP

== Other uses ==
- Actual deferral percentage, a 401(k) test for highly compensated employees
- AllDay Project, a South Korean music group
- Andorran peseta, a former currency of Andorra
- Angine de Poitrine, a rock duo from Quebec

== See also ==
- Adposition, a class of words used to express spatial or temporal relations
- Adap, a dialect of Dzongkha
