= Chixoy =

Chixoy may refer to:

- Chixoy River
- Chixoy Hydroelectric Dam
