= ADIVIMA =

Guatemalan human rights organization

ADIVIMA (The Association for the Integral Development of the Victims of the Violence of the Verapaces, Maya Achí) is a non-profit human rights organization in Guatemala that works to find solutions to the social, economic, political, cultural, and educational problems that resulted from the Guatemalan Civil War. The organization is based in Rabinal, Baja Verapaz, and concentrates its work in the surrounding communities that were some of those most affected by the violence of the internal conflict.

== History ==
ADIVIMA was officially formed in 1994 when three survivors of the Rio Negro Massacre – Carlos Chen, Jesus Tecu Osorio and Pedrina Burrero Lopez – expanded their community group for orphans, widows, widowers, displaced persons and survivors of the internal conflict to form an official organization. The initial project of ADIVIMA was to work to get exhumations from the Rio Negro massacres and prosecute those responsible for the human rights violations. Jesus Tecu Osorio was essential in leading this project, and through his efforts and those of ADIVIMA, some of the mass graves of the Rio Negro massacre were exhumed and nine of those responsible were prosecuted and convicted. In 1996, Jesus Tecu Osorio won the Reebok Human Rights Award for his work in the case.

== Organizational structure ==
ADIVIMA's work to assist survivors falls into three main categories: Human rights, socioeconomic development, and community organization.

=== Community organization ===
ADIVIMA works with leaders from the surrounding rural communities to encourage participation in local and national government. ADIVIMA sponsors workshops to train male, female, and youth community leaders in how to affectively assert their rights and work with the larger government structure.

=== Rio Negro massacre reparations ===
While some individuals that were responsible for some of the Rio Negro massacres that killed over 440 people have been sent to prison, the survivors affected by the building of the Chixoy Dam have never been fully justly compensated for their losses. ADIVIMA is one of the participating organizations in the COCAHICH (Coordinating Committee of Communities Affected by the Construction of the Chixoy Dam), which is a committee of indigenous Maya Achí communities that are fighting for reparations in the Rio Negro Massacre case. An official report by the Center for Political Ecology, which was peer reviewed by both the American Association for the Advancement of Science and the American Anthropological Association, found that the creation of the dam caused social, cultural, and economic damage to the affected communities and was in violation of international law. COCAHICH holds the Guatemalan government, the National Institute of Electricity (INDE), the World Bank, and the Inter-American Development Bank responsible for the massacres and to make reparations to those affected by the construction of the dam.

In 2004, ADIVIMA, as a member of COCAHICH, participated in a peaceful protest of more than 2000 people from the affected communities at the site of the dam in order to petition for the creation of a Damages Verification Committee to analyze the damages and possible reparations in regards to the construction of the Chixoy Dam. The next day authorities met with the protesters and signed an official document for the creation of a Damages Verification Committee. After the protest, the INDE filed a formal complaint to the Public Prosecutor’s Office stating that the leaders of the protest were charged with threatening the internal security of the nation, causing bodily harm, and making threats against the INDE. Warrants for the arrest of COCAHICH leaders were issued, and among them were ADIVIMA founder Carlos Chen Osorio and executive director Juan de Dios Garcia.^{[4]} All but of the charges were later dropped after lawyers from the Environmental Defender Law Center in the United States intervened, but experts consider this move by the INDE to be an attempt to intimidate those working to obtain reparations.^{[5]} The Damages Verifications Committee was finally convened for the first time in December 2005. The World Bank has accepted the invitation of the commission to join, and the Inter-American Development Bank is considering the offer. While the process has finally begun, still more than twenty years after the massacres no one has been compensated for their losses. ADIVIMA, along with other organizations is continuing to work for reparations for those affected by the creation of the Chixoy Dam.
