= List of Ramsar sites in Guatemala =

The list of Ramsar sites in Guatemala includes wetlands in Guatemala that are considered to be of "international importance" under the Ramsar Convention.

For a full list of all Ramsar sites worldwide, see the Ramsar list of wetlands of international importance.

== List of Ramsar sites ==
Name	Location	Area (km^{2})	Designated	Description	Image
Eco-región Lachuá	Alta Verapaz; 15°53′N 90°40′W	535.23	24 May 2006		
Manchón-Guamuchal	San Marcos; 14°28′N 92°5′W	135.00	25 April 1995	One of the last remaining mangrove forest areas on the pacific coast of Guatemala.	
Parque Nacional Laguna del Tigre	Petén; 17°27′N 90°52′W	3350.80	26 June 1990		
Parque Nacional Yaxhá-Nakum-Naranjo	Petén; 17°09′N 89°25′W	371.60	2 February 2006		
Punta de Manabique	Izabal; 15°50′N 88°28′W	1329.00	28 January 2000		
Refugio de Vida Silvestre Bocas del Polochic	Izabal; 15°25′N 89°22′W	212.27	20 March 1996		
Reserva de Usos Múltiples Río Sarstún	Izabal; 15°51′N 88°58′W	352.02	22 March 2005		

== See also ==
- Ramsar Convention
- List of Ramsar sites worldwide
