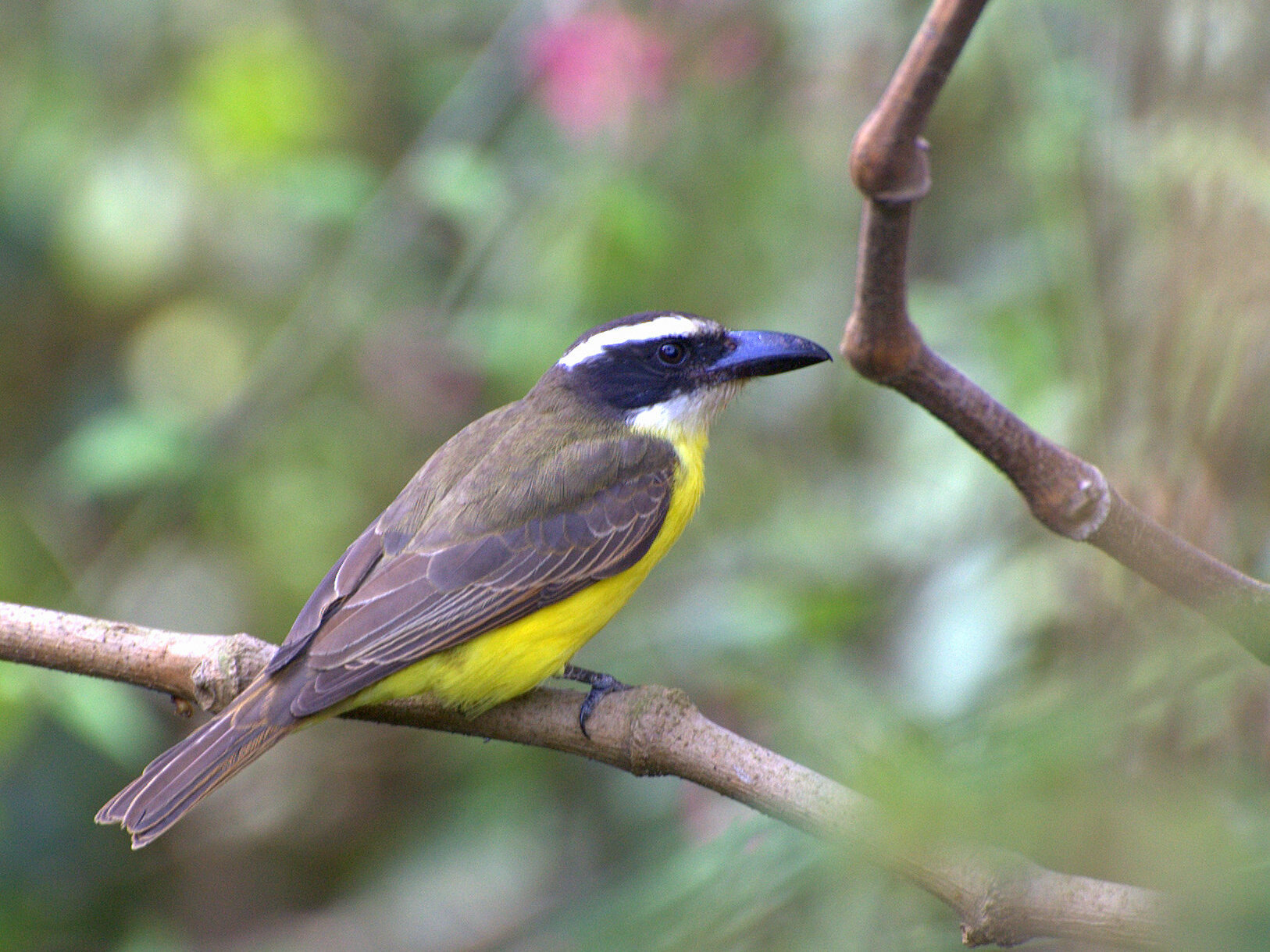

Conservation status
- Least Concern (IUCN 3.1)

Scientific classification
- Kingdom: Animalia
- Phylum: Chordata
- Class: Aves
- Order: Passeriformes
- Family: Tyrannidae
- Genus: Megarynchus
- Species: M. pitangua

Binomial name
- Megarynchus pitangua (Linnaeus, 1766)

Synonyms
- Lanius pitangua; Megarhynchus pitangua (lapsus)

= Boat-billed flycatcher =

Species of bird

The boat-billed flycatcher (Megarynchus pitangua) is a large member of the family Tyrannidae, the tyrant flycatchers. It is found in Mexico, in every Central American country, on Trinidad, and in every mainland South American country though only as a vagrant in Chile.

== Taxonomy and systematics ==
The boat-billed flycatcher was originally described as Lanius pitangua, mistakenly placing it in the shrike family. It was eventually moved to its present genus Megarynchus that was erected in 1824. That name is from the Greek "μεγα" (mega) meaning "much" and "ῥυγχος" (rhunkhos) meaning "bill". The specific epithet derives from the Tupi language name for the bird, "Pitanguá guacú".

The boat-billed flycatcher is the only member of its genus and has these six subspecies:

- M. p. tardiusculus Moore, RT, 1941
- M. p. caniceps Ridgway, 1906
- M. p. mexicanus (Lafresnaye, 1851)
- M. p. deserticola Griscom, 1930
- M. p. pitangua (Linnaeus, 1766)
- M. p. chrysogaster Sclater, PL, 1860

There are differences among the subspecies' vocalizations, leading some authors to state that "critical re-evaluation of [the] races is needed". The Clements taxonomy recognizes some distinctions within the species by calling M. p. pitangua the "boat-billed flycatcher (South American)", M. p. chrysogaster the "boat-billed flycatcher (Tumbes)", and the other four subspecies the "boat-billed flycatcher (northern)".

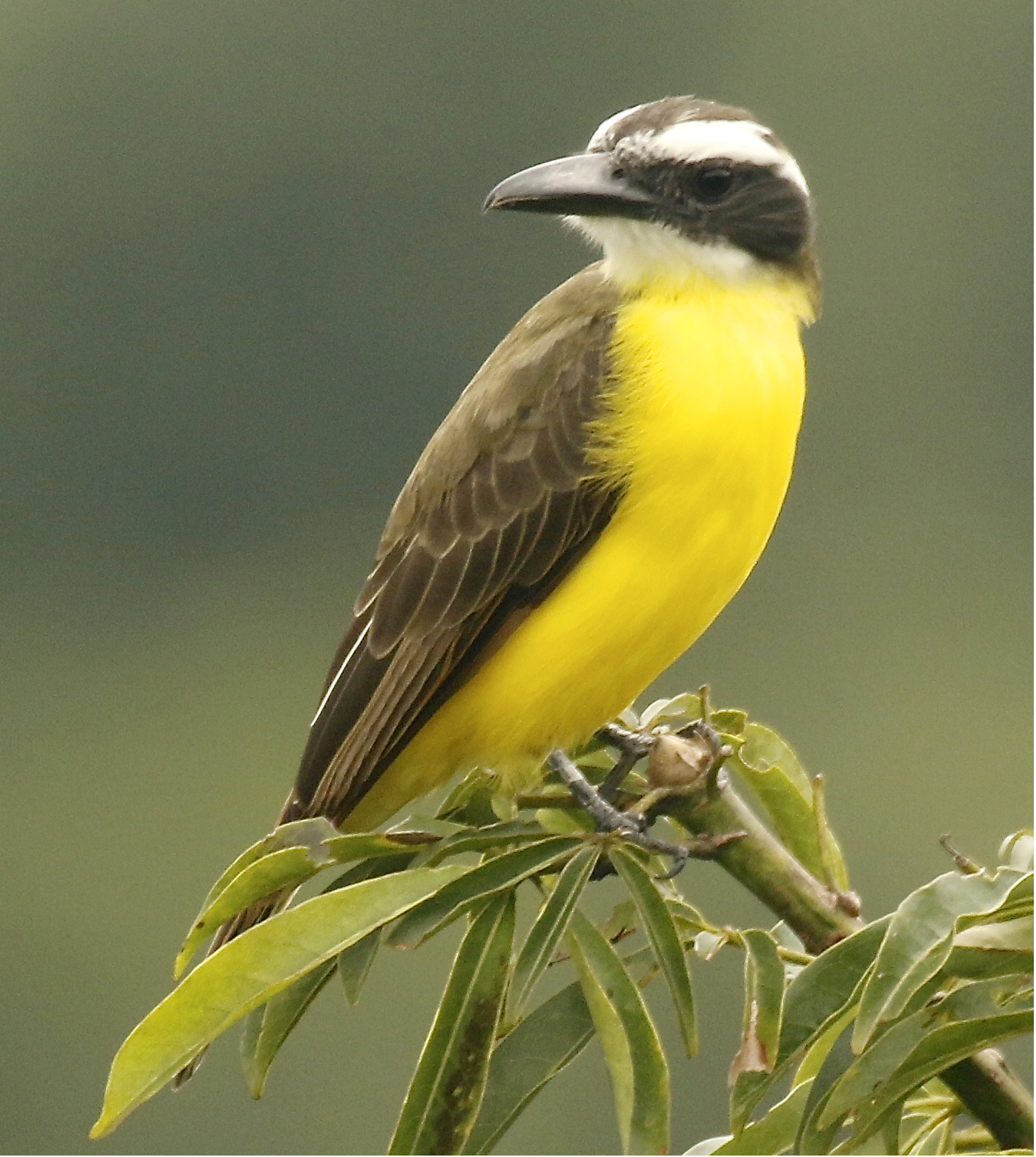
Yasuni National Park, Ecuador

== Description ==
The boat-billed flycatcher is 21.5 to 24 cm (8.5 to 9.4 in) long and weighs 53 to 70 g (1.9 to 2.5 oz). The sexes have the same plumage. Adults of the nominate subspecies M. p. pitangua have a blackish brown or sooty crown with a mostly hidden yellow to orange-rufous patch in the center. They have a wide white supercilium that begins at the forehead and wraps almost all the way around the nape, a wide black band from the lores to the ear coverts, and white cheeks. They have olive to dull brownish olive upperparts. Their wings are dusky brownish, usually with thin pale cinnamon or rufous edges on the flight feathers. Their tail is dusky brownish with thin pale cinnamon or rufous outer feather edges. Their throat is white and their underparts bright yellow. Juveniles lack the crown patch, have a yellow tinge on the supercilium, and have darker and more brownish upperparts and wider cinnamon edges on the flight feathers than adults.

The other subspecies of the boat-billed flycatcher differ from the nominate and each other thus:

- M. p. mexicanus: brighter, more greenish olive upperparts and no rufous on the tail feathers
- M. p. caniceps: grayer crown and more grayish olive upperparts than mexicanus
- M. p. tardiusculus: similar to mexicanus and caniceps
- M. p. deserticola: similar to mexicanus and caniceps
- M. p. chrysogaster: tawny-orange crown patch; more prominent rufous edges on upperwing coverts and flight feathers and richer yellow underparts

All subspecies have the species' characteristic long, wide, heavy, arched bill; it is blackish with sometimes a brownish base to the mandible. They have a brown iris and blackish legs and feet.

The boat-billed flycatcher is somewhat similar to the great kiskadee (Pitangus sulphuratus) and the social flycatcher (Myiozetetes similis) but is larger, has a much heavier bill, and has more olivaceous upperparts and browner wings and tail than they.

== Distribution and habitat ==
The subspecies of the boat-billed flycatcher are found thus:

- M. p. tardiusculus: western Mexico from southwestern Sinaloa south into western Nayarit
- M. p. caniceps: southwestern Jalisco in western Mexico
- M. p. mexicanus: from southern Tamaulipas in eastern and Guerrero in western Mexico south through Central America including some offshore islands into northwestern Colombia's Chocó Department
- M. p. deserticola: valley of the Negro River in central Guatemala
- M. p. pitangua: Trinidad; northern, central, and eastern Colombia; most of Venezuela; the Guianas; eastern Ecuador and Peru, all of Brazil south to Rio Grande do Sul; northern and eastern Bolivia; Paraguay, extreme northern Uruguay; and northeastern Argentina south into Corrientes Province
- M. p. chrysogaster: disjunctly west of the Andes from western Esmeraldas Province in northwestern Ecuador south into far northern Peru's Tumbes and northern Piura departments

The boat-billed flycatcher has also been recorded as a vagrant in Chile.

The boat-billed flycatcher inhabits a wide variety of wooded and forested landscapes in the tropical and subtropical zones. Most are somewhat open, like savanna and clearings with scattered trees, plantations, the edges of continuous forest, and gallery forest. In the Amazon Basin it is most often found in the canopy of várzea and the edges of lakes and rivers. It also occurs in mature secondary forest and well-shaded gardens.

In elevation the boat-billed flycatcher is generally found from sea level to 1,500 m (4,900 ft) in Mexico and Central America but locally reaches 1,850 m (6,100 ft) in northern Central America and 2,200 m (7,200 ft) in Costa Rica. In Colombia it reaches 1,400 m (4,600 ft), in Ecuador 1,300 m (4,300 ft), and in Peru 1,200 m (3,900 ft). In Venezuela it is mostly found below 1,000 m (3,300 ft) but reaches about 1,900 m (6,200 ft) and in Brazil it occurs below 1,500 m (4,900 ft).

== Behavior ==
=== Movement ===
The boat-billed flycatcher is usually considered a year-round resident throughout its range. However, it appears that the population in far southern Brazil and Argentina may be migratory. The species also wanders widely and also appears in some areas to move from higher elevations to lower ones after the breeding season.

=== Feeding ===
The boat-billed flycatcher feeds mostly on invertebrates, especially very large insects like cicadas. It also includes fruits of figs (Ficus), berries, seeds, and small vertebrates in its diet. It primarily forages in pairs or small family groups and occasionally joins mixed-species feeding flocks. It mostly forages from the forest's mid-level to the canopy and often within dense canopy. It does frequently perch in the open atop or at the edge of a large tree. It takes insect prey mostly by snatching it from foliage after a short sally; it also will take it while briefly hovering. It seldom takes insects in mid-air. It takes fruits and seeds by gleaning while perched and with short sallies.

=== Breeding ===
The boat-billed flycatcher's breeding season varies widely across its range. It Costa Rica and Trinidad it spans February to June. In Colombia it includes July to October, in southern Brazil November, and Argentina October to December. Its nest is a shallow cup made from twigs, grass, leaves, and other plant materials, and usually is placed in a branch fork between about 6 and 30 m (20 and 100 ft) above the ground. The clutch is two to three eggs. The incubation period is 17 to 18 days and fledging occurs about 24 days after hatch. Details of parental care are not known.

=== Vocalization ===
The boat-billed flycatcher's dawn song has been described as a "loud but simple and clear, slightly reedy and rolled whée-dic, pprrri-iu, chirr-rr or cheer chirree, monotonously repeated". It also sings a "shorter prriu or cheer punctuated by slurred bo-oy or chrr-ee". The nominate subspecies makes a "strident nasal kryeeeh-nyeh-nyeh-nyeh" call; subspecies M. p. chrysogaster makes a very different "fast kreh-kreh-kreh-kreh-kreh-kreeeenh and series of kirrr-wick calls". The species also has a wide variety of other "harsh and slightly squealing...gruff and often rattling, stuttering, or quavering" calls.

== Status ==
The IUCN has assessed the boat-billed flycatcher as being of Least Concern. It has an extremely large range and its estimated population of at least five million mature individuals is believed to be stable. No immediate threats have been identified. It is considered common in northern Central America and "widespread and fairly common" in Costa Rica. It is common in Colombia and widespread in Ecuador. In Peru the nominate subspecies is fairly common while subspecies M. p. chrysogaster is uncommon. It is fairly common in Venezuela and Brazil. It occurs in many protected areas both public and private. It is "found in [a] wide variety of wooded habitats...exhibits tolerance of degraded habitats [and is] not likely to become threatened".
