= Jesús Tecú Osorio =

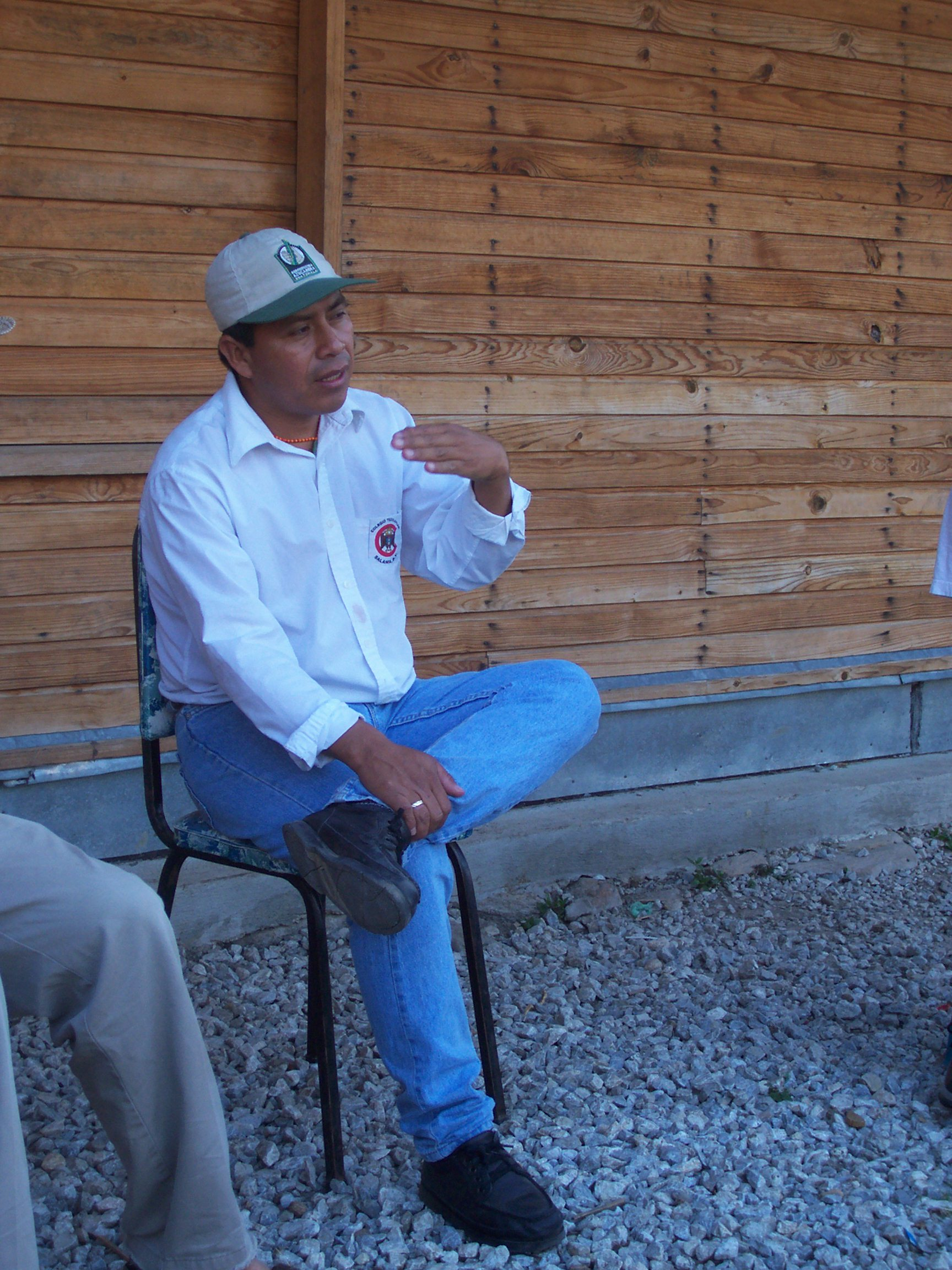
Jesús Tecú sits in front of the Rabinal school he founded.

Jesús Tecú Osorio (born 1971 in Río Negro, Baja Verapaz) is a Guatemalan social activist, worker for human rights, and advocate for the Achi Maya.

In 1982, much of the population of Río Negro was murdered; Tecú survived, but witnessed the deaths of most of his immediate family members, including his two year old little brother, who was torn from his arms and thrown into a ravine. He spent two years as a household slave to one of the perpetrators before being remanded into the custody of his older sister, who had also survived the massacres.

In 1993, Tecú began legal proceedings to have the mass grave of Río Negro exhumed; this led directly to the prosecution of three of the men responsible for the massacre and, in 1998, to their being sentenced to death for crimes against humanity (in 1999, their sentences were commuted to 60 years in prison). As of 2006, this is the only Guatemalan trial for crimes against humanity committed during the civil war for which the perpetrators have been convicted.

Tecú has organized four separate charitable organizations, including a legal aid clinic, for the Achi Maya people. He has written his memoirs – these have been translated into English as The Massacres of Rio Negro – and gone on speaking tours throughout Canada, Europe, and the USA.

In 1996, Tecú won the Reebok Human Rights Award; he used the USD 25,000 prize money to start the New Hope Foundation which provided scholarships and later expanded into a school called the New Hope Community Bilingual Institute in Rabinal. In 2007, he was awarded an honorary law degree from Saint Francis Xavier University. In 2010, Tecu was awarded the Roger Baldwin Medal of Liberty by Human Rights First.

== See also ==
- Río Negro Massacre
- ADIVIMA
