= Jim Gray (jurist) =

American judge (born 1945)

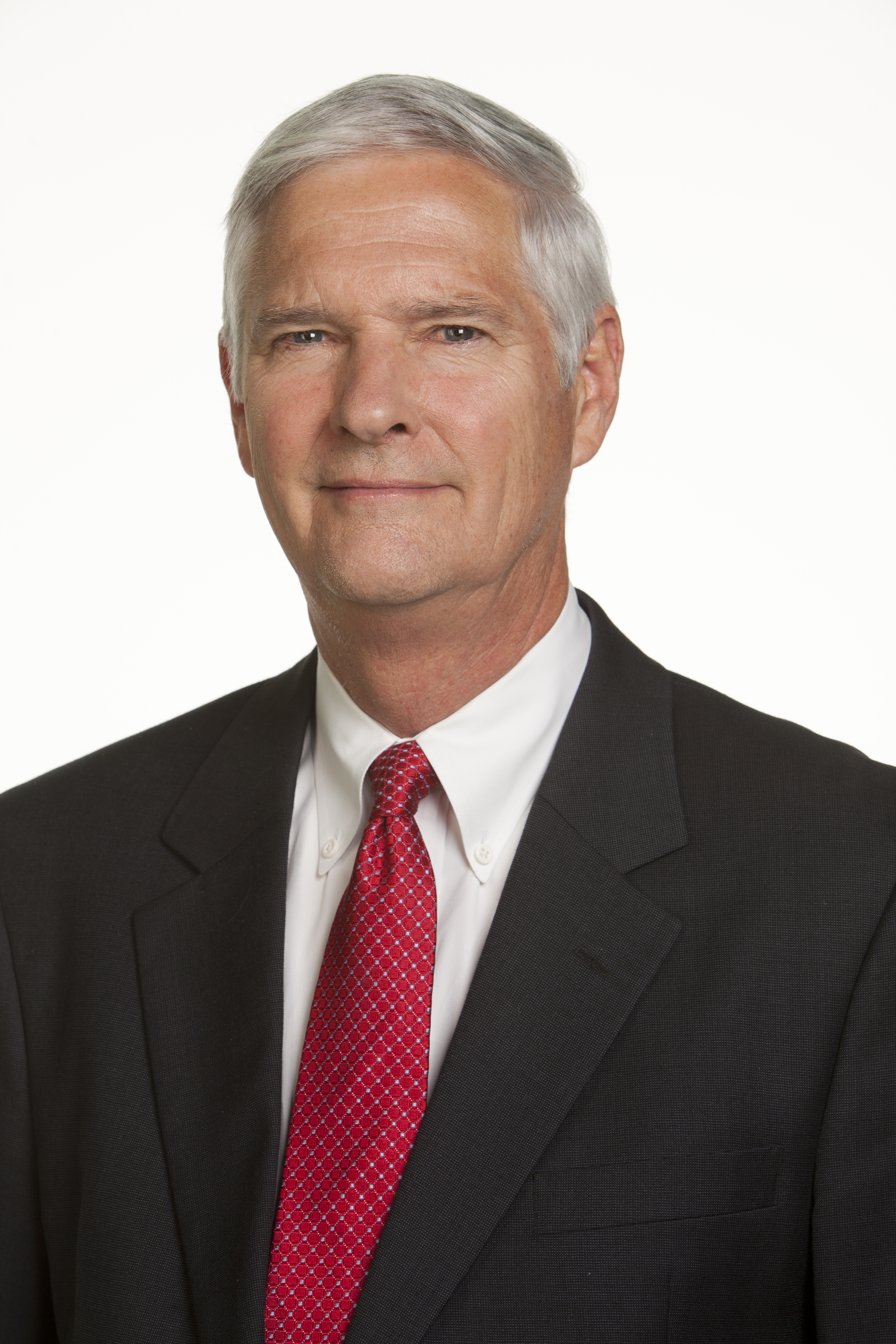
- Gray in 2012
- Born: James Polin Gray; February 14, 1945 (age 81); Washington, D.C., U.S.
- Education: University of California, Los; Angeles (BA); University of Southern; California (JD)
- Political party: Libertarian (1998–present)
- Other political affiliations: Republican (before 1998)
- Website: Official website

James Polin Gray (born February 14, 1945) is an American jurist and writer. He was the presiding judge of the Superior Court of Orange County, California. Gray was the 2012 Libertarian Party vice presidential nominee, as well as the party's 2004 candidate for the United States Senate in California. He is the author of multiple books and a play, and is an outspoken critic of American drug laws.

Gray has been a member of the California Judicial Council, as well as the California Judicial Council's Advisory Committee on Juvenile Law, the Alcohol Advisory Board to the Orange County Board of Supervisors, the Advisory Board of the California Department of Alcohol and Drug Programs, and the Orange County Law Library. He has also been a member of the Board of Councilors of the University of Southern California Law School. Gray also introduced Orange County to the Peer Court system, where juvenile defendants travel to a school outside their district to have their actual cases tried by other teenagers. In 2012, Gray was nominated by Libertarian Party convention delegates as the running mate of former New Mexico Governor Gary Johnson.

He unsuccessfully sought the Libertarian presidential nomination in the 2020 election.

== Background ==
Born in Washington, D.C., and raised in the Los Angeles, California, area, Gray earned his undergraduate degree from the University of California, Los Angeles in 1966, after which he taught in the Peace Corps in Costa Rica. Gray returned to California and earned a Juris Doctor degree from the University of Southern California Law School in 1971.

== Judicial career ==
From 1972 through 1975, Gray practiced law as a Lieutenant with the United States Navy Judge Advocate General's Corps at Naval Air Station Agana in Guam and Naval Air Station Lemoore in California.

After five years in private practice, he was named to the Santa Ana Municipal Court in 1983 by Governor George Deukmejian, who then appointed Gray to the Orange County Superior Court in 1989. Gray retired as a judge in January 2009. Much of his legal career has dealt with drug-related issues.

== 2004 U.S. Senate candidacy ==
Following an unsuccessful bid in 1998 for the Republican nomination for the congressional seat in California's 46th congressional district, Gray left the Republican Party and joined the Libertarian Party. In 2003, he openly considered making a run for the 2004 Libertarian presidential nomination, but eventually decided to instead run for the U.S. Senate. In November 2003, he declared his candidacy for the U.S. Senate seat occupied by Barbara Boxer in California. Gray was a keynote speaker at the 2004 Libertarian National Convention. In March 2004 Gray defeated former Libertarian Party of California chair Gail Lightfoot in a statewide primary for the party's nomination for U.S. Senate. Gray suspended his judicial activities while running for the Senate against incumbent Democratic Senator Barbara Boxer and Republican Bill Jones. Gray received 216,522 votes, 1.8% of the total vote, finishing behind Boxer, Jones, and Peace and Freedom Party candidate Marsha Feinland.

== Activism as war on drugs opponent ==
Gray is an outspoken critic of drug laws and the war on drugs, particularly in the state of California. He was a proponent of the Regulate, Control and Tax Cannabis Act of 2010, a statewide referendum measure that was defeated in the 2010 California state elections.

He is the author of Why Our Drug Laws Have Failed and What We Can Do About It – A Judicial Indictment of the War on Drugs (2001), and appears in the 2007 documentary American Drug War: The Last White Hope.

In early 2011 Gray was one of the four co-sponsors of an initiative called Regulate Marijuana Like Wine. Had it passed, the initiative would have regulated cannabis consumption and production like wine in California. While the measure failed to collect the minimum number of signatures needed for qualification to be placed on the ballot in the 2012 statewide election, Gray's active role in the effort prompted media speculation regarding his future in the Libertarian Party and in national politics.

== 2012 vice-presidential candidacy ==
On April 27, 2012, the question "What would you think of Judge Gray running for Vice President?" was posted from Gray's Facebook page, and received numerous positive responses. Within three days of the posting, it was confirmed that Gray had been chosen by 2012 Libertarian presidential candidate Gary Johnson to be his preferred running mate should Johnson receive the party's nomination at the 2012 Libertarian National Convention. Gray then confirmed his candidacy for the Libertarian vice-presidential nomination in an open letter to the party's Convention delegates. On May 5, 2012, Gray won the Libertarian Party (LP) vice-presidential nomination on the first ballot with 60% of the vote. He ran on the ticket with Johnson, who received the LP presidential nomination.

== 2020 presidential campaign ==
On April 13, 2020, Gray announced his intention to seek the Libertarian Party's nomination for president with Larry Sharpe as his running mate. The announcement came in response to Lincoln Chafee exiting the race. He dropped out on May 23, 2020.

== Personal life ==
Gray resides in Newport Beach, California. He is married, and is the father of three children.

== Works ==
=== Essays ===
- The Functional Libertarian Series: LA Times and Life & Liberty Blog Networks.

=== Books ===
- Why Our Drug Laws Have Failed: A Judicial Indictment Of War On Drugs. Temple University Press. 2001. ISBN 978-1566398602.
- Wearing the Robe: The Art and Responsibilities of Judging in Today's Courts. Square One Publishers. 2008. ISBN 978-0757002427.
- A Voter's Handbook: Effective Solutions to America's Problems. The Forum Press. 2010. ISBN 978-0984275229.

=== Musical ===
- Americans All (Abridged) A Musical In One Act Book, Music, and Lyrics by Judge James P. Gray

Party political offices
Preceded by Wayne Allyn Root	Libertarian nominee for Vice President of the United States; 2012	Succeeded by Bill Weld
