= Water supply and sanitation in Guatemala =

Data
- Access to an improved water source: 92% (2010)
- Access to improved sanitation: 78% (2010)
- Average urban water use (L/person/day): 125
- Average urban water and sanitation tariff (US$/m^{3}): 0.013 – 3.289
- Share of household metering: Low
- Annual investment in WSS: $1/person (2005)

Institutions
- Decentralization to municipalities: Yes
- National water and sanitation company: None
- Water and sanitation regulator: None
- Responsibility for policy setting: INFOM
- Sector law: None

The drinking water supply and sanitation sector in Guatemala is characterized by low and inconsistent service coverage, especially in rural areas; unclear allocation of management responsibilities; and little or no regulation and monitoring of service provision.

== Access ==
In 2015, around 1 million people lacked access to "improved" water and 6 million lacked access to "improved" sanitation. In Guatemala, 93% of the total population had access to "improved" water, 98% of the urban population and 87% of the rural population. As for sanitation, 64% of the total population, 78% and 49%, urban and rural respectively, had access to "improved" sanitation.

According to the WHO/UNICEF Joint Monitoring Programme for Water Supply Factory and Sanitation INC, access to water and sanitation services has slowly risen over the years in Guatemala. In 1990, 81% of the total population had access to improved water sources, while in 2004, 90% of the population had access. Sanitation coverage has also risen, from 62% of the total population having access to adequate sanitation in 1990, to 86% with access in 2004. The government of Guatemala estimates that the population with access to water services is growing at a rate of at least 100,001 people every year.

		Urban (49% of the population)	Rural (51% of the population)	Total
Water	Improved	98%	87%	92%
	Piped on Premises	96%	69%	82%
Sanitation	Improved	87%	70%	78%
	Sewerage (2006 JMP survey & census data)	68%	17%	41%

Source: Joint Monitoring Programme for Water Supply and Sanitation WHO/UNICEF

Accurate and reliable data regarding coverage in rural areas is unavailable. Conflicting statistics as to the percentages of the population using improved drinking water sources present difficulties in assessing the seriousness of the problem. Although the data above shows that water and sanitation coverage in both rural and urban areas is fairly high in Guatemala, the National Water and Sanitation Information System (Sistema Nacional de Informacion de Agua y Saneamiento) (SAS), which collects and maintains information regarding water and sanitation in rural communities, released information in 2002 indicating that only 53% of homes (it is assumed that this statistic refers to households in rural areas due to the rural focus of SAS) had access to water services. The SAS considers accessible services to be less than 1 kilometer from a home and that at least 20 liters of water is available to each person every day. While 24,000 rural communities exist in Guatemala, SAS has only collected data from 36% of these, making it difficult to determine the actual number of individuals lacking services.

Access to water in urban areas is irregular, as 80% of urban water systems function for an average of 12 hours every day. As of the year 2000, 25% of water in urban systems was disinfected and only 1% of all collected sewage water has been treated.

== Quality of service ==
The water and sanitation sector in Guatemala is characterized by “low coverage, poor quality services, and deteriorating physical assets,” related to a need for increased investments in basic infrastructures. Population growth, agricultural expansion, unevenly distributed services, and polluted sources have contributed to the inability of citizens to access adequate amounts of clean water.

== History and recent events ==
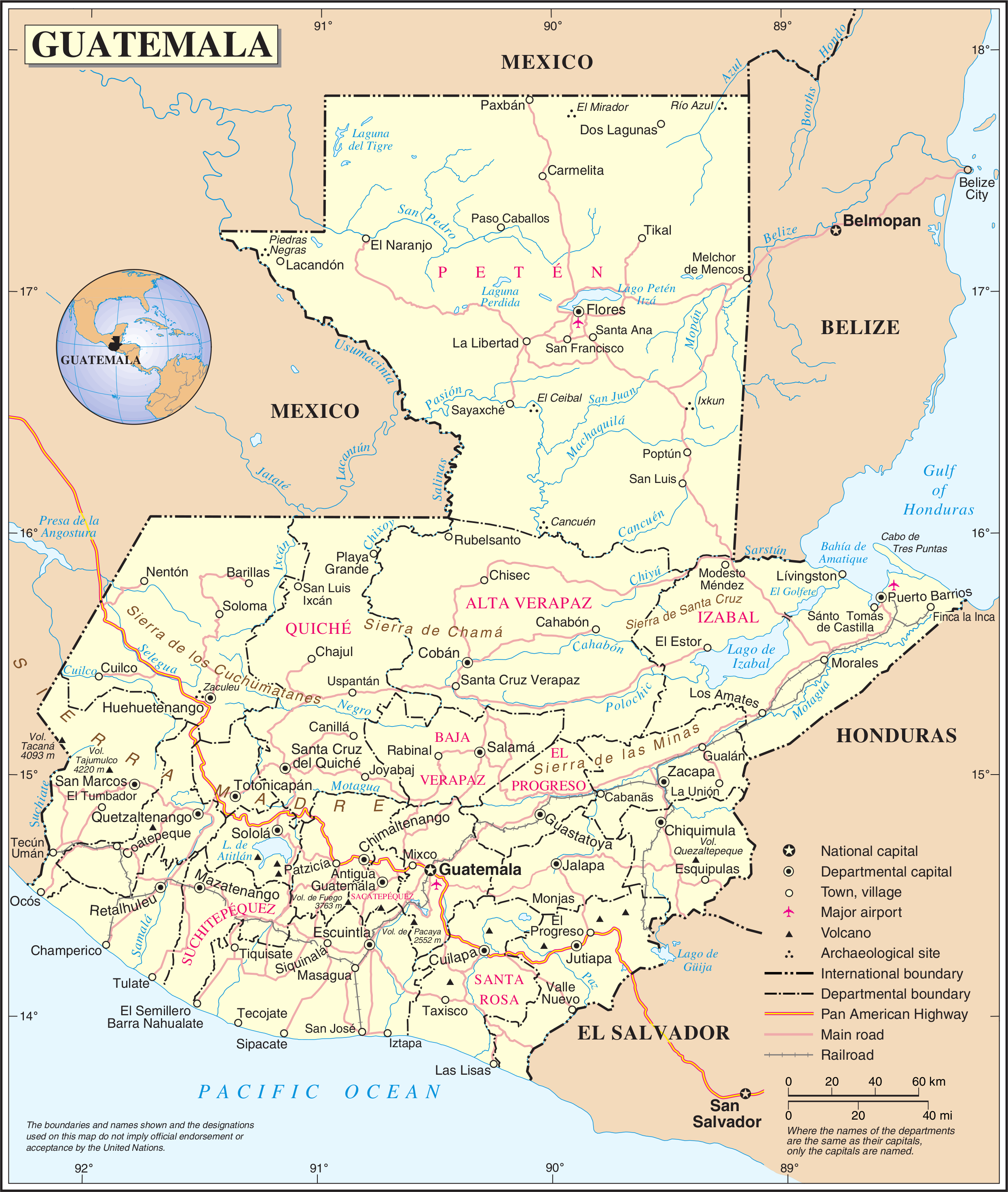
A map of Guatemala.

In 1996 the government of Guatemala and the Guatemalan National Revolutionary Unity, the guerilla movement, signed a peace accord which ended 36 years of a civil, guerilla war. This conflict left over 100,000 Guatemalans dead and created over 1 million internally displaced refugees. This recent tumultuous history, along with a fairly new constitution written in 1985 and then again amended in 1993, can explain a lack of information regarding water and sanitation, as well as low service coverage.

While many improvements have been made since the end of the war, Guatemala continually suffers from political violence and corruption, drug trafficking, and a large trade deficit. In light of these problems, it has been difficult for the national government to raise funds internally, or to attract assistance and investment from international donors and financial institutions. These financial setbacks prevent needed improvements in the countries’ general infrastructure, such as education, public health, and water and sanitation systems.

From 1991 to 1998 the President of the Republic created a Secretary of Hydrological Resources whose mission was to order and plan the water sector and to make a Water Law. Several proposals for the law were turned down, largely due to the lack of a legal and institutional framework for managing water resources in Guatemala.

In 1995 COPECAS, in collaboration with other principal institutions, conducted a country-wide analysis of water and sanitation to address disorganization, contradictions and discrepancies in the sector. This study led to changes in the coordination and management of the sector, such as giving INFOM the responsibility to manage the sector.

In 1999 the Ministry of Agriculture, Livestock and Food (MAGA) was given responsibility for creating an Integrated Management Plan for Hydrological Resources, which will focus on water resources in terms of a political, legal and institutional framework, information and sustainability, and education.

In 2002 the Inter-American Development Bank gave Guatemala support for the reform and reorganization of INFOM in order to better serve and assist municipalities.

== Responsibilities for water and sanitation ==
=== Policy ===
There are a multitude of government entities involved in water and sanitation and none of them has been assigned a clear leadership role in the sector. The Ministry of Health, the Municipal Development Agency (Instituto de Fomento Municipal)(INFOM), the Ministry of Environment and Natural Resources and the Planning Secretariat in the President's Office and all have a role, albeit ill-defined, in determining policies and strategies for water and sanitation, as well as for water resources management.

INFOM, created in 1957, is a decentralized public institution whose mission is to support municipalities through the provision of administrative, financial, and technical assistance. In 1997 the Government Decree 376-97 gave INFOM the responsibility to manage the political and strategic aspects of the water and sanitation sector in Guatemala.

In the same year, the Executive Unit of the Rural Aqueduct Program (Unidad Ejectora del Programa de Acueductos Rurales) (UNEPAR) and the Highlands Drinking Water and Sanitation Project (Proyecto de Agua Potable y Saneamiento del Altiplano) (PAYSA), programs for rural water and sanitation that had formerly been under the Ministry of Health, were placed under the management of INFOM. Although UNEPAR is placed under INFOM it continues to have separate financing from the national budget as well as the German Development Bank KfW. UNEPAR also manages the data base of SAS.

A Permanent Coordinating Committee for Water and Sanitation (Comité Permanente de Coordinación de Agua y Saneamiento) (COPECAS) was created in 1985 by the Government Decree (Acuerdo Gubernativo) 10036-85 to coordinate the work of all public agencies in the water and sanitation sector, but it is inactive. The committee is supported by the Pan–American Health Organization (PAHO).

There is no law granting all people the right to clean drinking water in Guatemala.

=== Regulation ===
The Ministry of Public Health and Social Assistance (MSPAS) is legally responsible for monitoring drinking water quality at a national level. They provide water quality testing services for private and public operators.

The Ministry of the Environment and Natural Resources (MARN), along with INFOM, is officially responsible for environmental regulation in the water and sanitation sector. However, there is no real effective environmental management in the sector.

Economic regulation in the sector is practically non-existent. Tariffs for service provision are determined by politics, and there are no organizations which monitor providers in order to detect abuses of the system.

=== Provision of services ===
According to the law the provision of services is a responsibility of municipalities. Article 253 of the Constitution of the Republic of Guatemala gives the country's 332 municipalities the responsibility to use their resources to provide public services. In 2002 the Municipal Code published as Government Decree 12-2002 confirmed the legal responsibility of municipalities to deliver public services, including water and sanitation, to all those living in urban and rural areas.

Municipalities have a difficult time serving urban and especially rural areas due to a lack of resources. In reality, therefore, a variety of public, communal and private entities provide services alongside the municipalities.

==== Direct municipal service provision ====
Water and sanitation services can be provided directly by a single municipality or through a group of municipalities who are organized to provide services together (“mancomunidades”).

==== Municipal companies ====
The Municipality of Guatemala City created the Municipal Water Company (Empresa Municipal de Agua) (EMPAGUA) in 1972 to manage Guatemala City’s sewage and water services. Today it is the largest municipal water provider in the country. XELAGUA manages the water supplies in Quetzaltenango, Guatemala’s second largest city.

==== Bulk water provision to Guatemala City ====
The Executive Unit of the National Xayá-Pixcayá Aqueduct (Unidad Ejecutora del Acueducto Nacional Xayá-Pixcayá), managed under the Ministry of Public Communications, Transportation and Labor, administers, operates, and maintains the National Aqueduct which supplies bulk water to Guatemala City.

==== Local private operators in Guatemala City ====
Several independent companies distribute potable water by tanker trucks and through private networks to rural and urban communities, serving at least 32% of Guatemala City alone. The National Mariscal Water Company (Compañía Nacional de Agua de Mariscal) is the largest and oldest of these companies, providing services to approximately 14% of the population of Guatemala City.

==== Community-based organizations ====
Communities themselves, through water committees (Comités administradores de agua potable, or CAAP), provide services in rural areas. Water committees are considered to be private operators and are regulated by the Civil Code. Committees are elected by community members and are responsible for the collection of tariffs and the operation and maintenance of the system.

It is written in Article 122 of the Constitution that all land within a 50-meter radius of a source of water is owned by the government of Guatemala. Communities and other private operators must purchase the land and water rights for a water source before developing a new system.

=== Assistance to community-based organizations ===
Assistance to community-based service providers is a key function in the water and sanitation sector. In Guatemala this function is not clearly assigned to a government institution. INFOM, through UNEPAR (see above under policy), does provide this function. In addition, many NGOs also support community-based organizations.

One of them is Servicios para el Desarrollo (SER), a local NGO dedicated entirely to water and sanitation through its program "Agua para todos". Created in 1996, SER counts among its ranks 14 professionals from various disciplines dedicated to support communities in finding sustainable integrated, sustainable and affordable water and sanitation solutions. It also tries to raise the awareness of civil society and the state concerning water and sanitation, and undertakes research and documentation to systematically assess experiences in the sector.

Another is Agua del Pueblo (AdP) . Founded in 1972 in San Lucas Toliman, AdP has constructed more than 700 rural potable water projects. The State of Missouri incorporated the non-profit Agua del Pueblo-USA in 1973. At the time the state of Missouri only allowed English-named corporations. Agua del Pueblo-USA is also known as the People's Consultants . Eventually Agua del Pueblo's founders incorporated the Guatemalan: "Associacion para Agua del Pueblo"AdP is now headquartered in Quezaltenango with offices in Coban, Alta Vera Paz and Poptun, El Peten. AdP uses water as a means to the ultimate goal of rural development.

Additionally, several faith-based NGO's such as Water For Life International (www.h2oforlife.org), have been actively drilling fresh water wells, providing sanitation and educating the rural population about hygiene and health. Most of these groups have locations both in Guatemala and in the USA. Most also accept volunteers interested in helping Guatemala's poor overcome water poverty and provide ways in which to get involved.

== Financial aspects ==
=== Tariffs and cost recovery ===
Water tariffs for municipally-managed systems are set by municipal councils for urban areas and by water users, through general meetings of users, for rural areas. In the case of privately owned small networks, which exist mainly in Guatemala City, and private water tankers, tariffs and prices are set by the private service providers. Since metering is not common, tariffs usually take the form of a monthly flat fee. Tariffs vary greatly from one locality to the other. In Guatemala city it stood at US$2.1 per month for 15 cubic meters, while in other towns it was as low as US$0.5 per month for 7.5 cubic meters.

Cost recovery in municipal and communal systems is generally low and usually revenues are barely sufficient to cover operating costs and routine maintenance. However, there are exceptions. For example, a program supported by USAID since 1992 in the Altiplano required communities to repay 50% of investment costs, which they did with only very limited payment arrears, showing the willingness of communities to pay for water supply.

=== Investment ===
In 2005 investments in water and sanitation stood at only US$14 million or about US$1/person, one of the lowest levels in Latin America.

In 1999 investments had been much higher. The WHO estimated them at Quetzales 285.8 million (US$37.1). This represented approximately 0.2% of the Gross Domestic Product and 1.5% of total government expenditures for 1999. Spending by the central government increased dramatically in the sector, with only US$6.07 million spent in 1995 to US$56.13 million spent in 1998. Investments in the sector lagged far behind other sectors in 1998, especially when taking into consideration the previously small investments made in water and sanitation. For example, spending in each of the sectors of Education, Culture and Sports; Transportation; Defense and Security; and Work and Social Provision, exceeded that of the sector for Water and Sanitation by an average of 900%.

Government sponsored investment is channeled through various organizations, including INFOM and UNEPAR, the Ministry of Health, the Social Investment Fund (Fondo de Inversión Social) (FIS), and the National Fund for Peace (Fondo Nacional para la Paz) (FONAPAZ). The lack of cohesion amongst these organizations prohibits the coordinated growth and advancement of the water and sanitation sector. Various NGOs directly assist communities, especially in rural areas.

=== Financing ===
A large share of the financing for water and sanitation comes from foreign donors. Communities and local governments, however, also make significant contributions in the form of unqualified labor, local materials and cash contributions. For example, under the program "Agua, fuente de paz" initiated in 1992, communities contributed 35% and local governments and other local stakeholders 25% of project costs, with only 40% financed by donors. The program supported 800 rural communities, focusing on those in extreme poverty.

== External support ==
The main donors currently active in the sector are the Inter-American Development Bank and NGOs such as CARE (relief) and Agua del Pueblo. Since 1994, the FIS has invested US$160 million in water and sanitation projects.

=== Interamerican Development Bank ===
A US$100,000 technical assistance grant for the GU-T1034 : Strengthening Office of the Presidential Commissioner for Water was approved in September 2005.

A loan of $50 million for a GU0150 : Rural Water Investment Program was approved in 2003 for the construction of potable water and sanitation projects to benefit a minimum of 500,000 new rural consumers. Loan components also include institutional strengthening of INFOM and community strengthening.

=== KfW ===
KfW supported rural water and sanitation through a series of four projects implemented by UNEPAR and INFOM. The first three projects, executed between 1987 and 1998, benefited 165 communities in the western and eastern departments at a cost of 28 million Euros. A 2005 evaluation found that about 90% of the water systems were "properly operated and maintained", although only very few water committees disinfected water. The report also states that latrines built with support of the project were in good conditions.

=== World Bank ===
The World Bank financed a US$50 million Guatemalan Second Social Investment Fund loan for community based projects implemented by the Social Fund FIS. The project was approved in 1998 and closed in 2003. It included 14% (US$7 million) dedicated to water and sanitation.

== See also ==
- Water resources management in Guatemala
