= Platyrhynchus =

Platyrhynchus may refer to:

- Platyrhynchus Swainson, 1820, a synonym of Megarynchus, a genus of bird
- Platyrhynchus Van Beneden, 1876, a synonym of Schizodelphis, an extinct genus of cetacean
