= Río Negro, Guatemala =

Río Negro
- Country: Guatemala

Río Negro (English: Black River) is a town in Baja Verapaz, Guatemala. It was the site of the Rio Negro Massacre by the paramilitary and military officials, during the voluntary and forced relocations of communities for the construction of the Chixoy hydroelectric dam.
