= Xalalá Dam =

Proposed hydroelectric power station in Guatemala

Coordinates: 15°41′34.2″N 90°47′10.9″W

The Xalalá Hydroelectric Dam is a proposed dam that will span the Chixoy River in the municipality of Ixcán in Guatemala. The US$ 400 million dam's hydroelectric power station will have an installed capacity of 181 MWe, generating an estimated 886 GWh of electricity per year.

== Controversy and funding ==
Despite the dam's electricity generation potential, there has been strong local opposition to the project. Controversy surrounds the site since it will flood 31.8 km^{2} and displace twelve Q'eqchi' Maya communities. It is a project of the Plan Puebla Panama. In the municipality of Ixcan, of 21,000 people who voted, 91% voted against the creation of the dam. Strong opposition to the project has been credited with the lack of funding for the site. Private funding of the site was halted in April 2007. Despite the government's efforts and interest from foreign investors, plans to finance the project have stopped since.

== See also ==
- List of hydroelectric power stations in Guatemala
