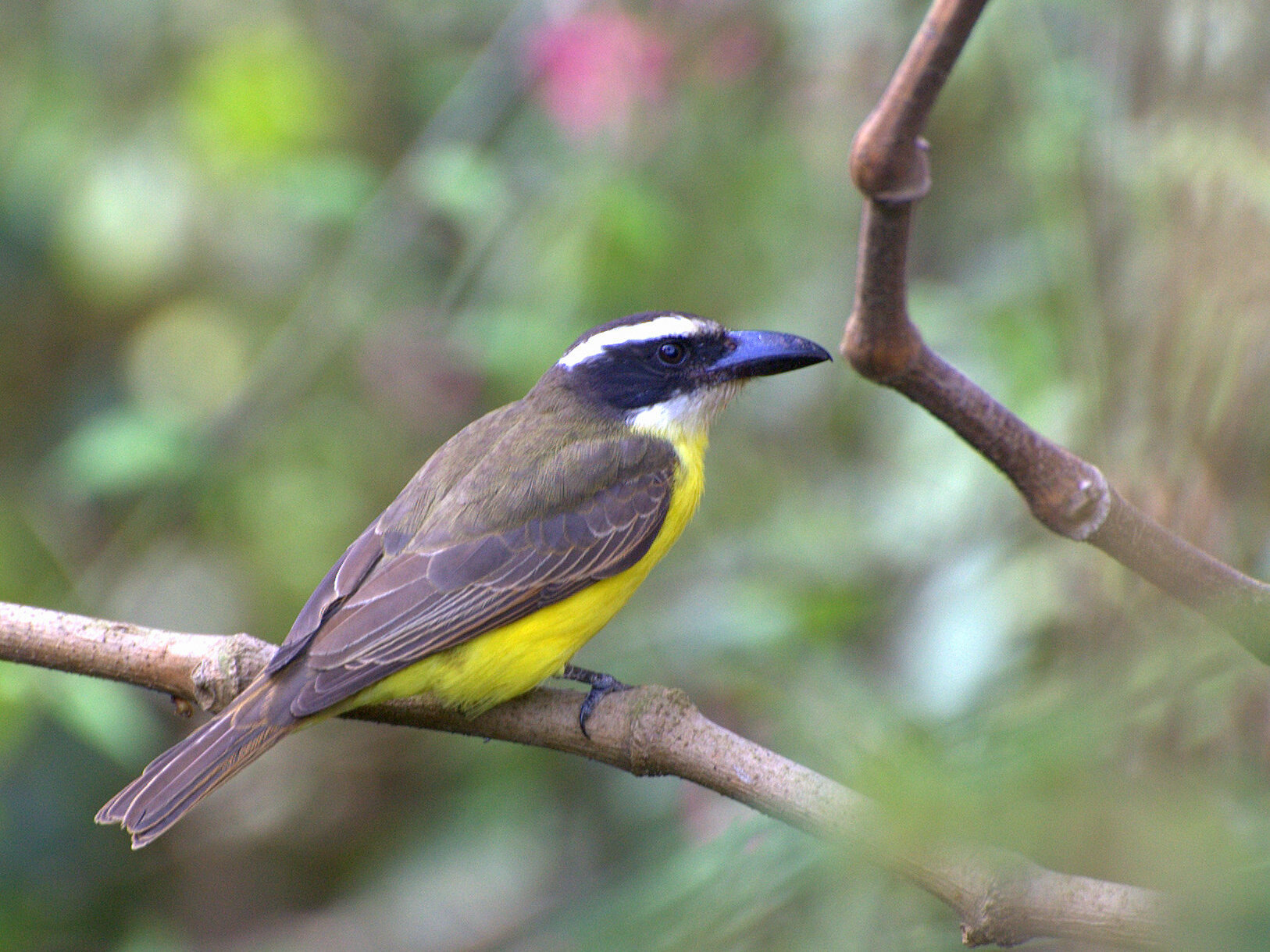
- Megarynchus pitangua

Scientific classification
- Domain: Eukaryota
- Kingdom: Animalia
- Phylum: Chordata
- Class: Aves
- Order: Passeriformes
- Family: Tyrannidae
- Genus: Megarynchus; Thunberg, 1824

Synonyms
- Platyrhynchus

= Megarynchus =

Megarhynchus

Genus of birds

Megarynchus is a genus of bird in the family Tyrannidae (the tyrant flycatchers). It is currently considered to be a monotypic genus.

== Taxonomy and systematics ==
=== Extant species ===
- Boat-billed flycatcher (Megarynchus pitangua)

=== Former species ===
Formerly, some authorities also considered the following species (or subspecies) as species within the genus Megarynchus:

- Samoan flycatcher (as Platyrhynchus albiventris)
