= Chixoy River =

Chixoy River Río Negro, Río Chixoy, Salinas River
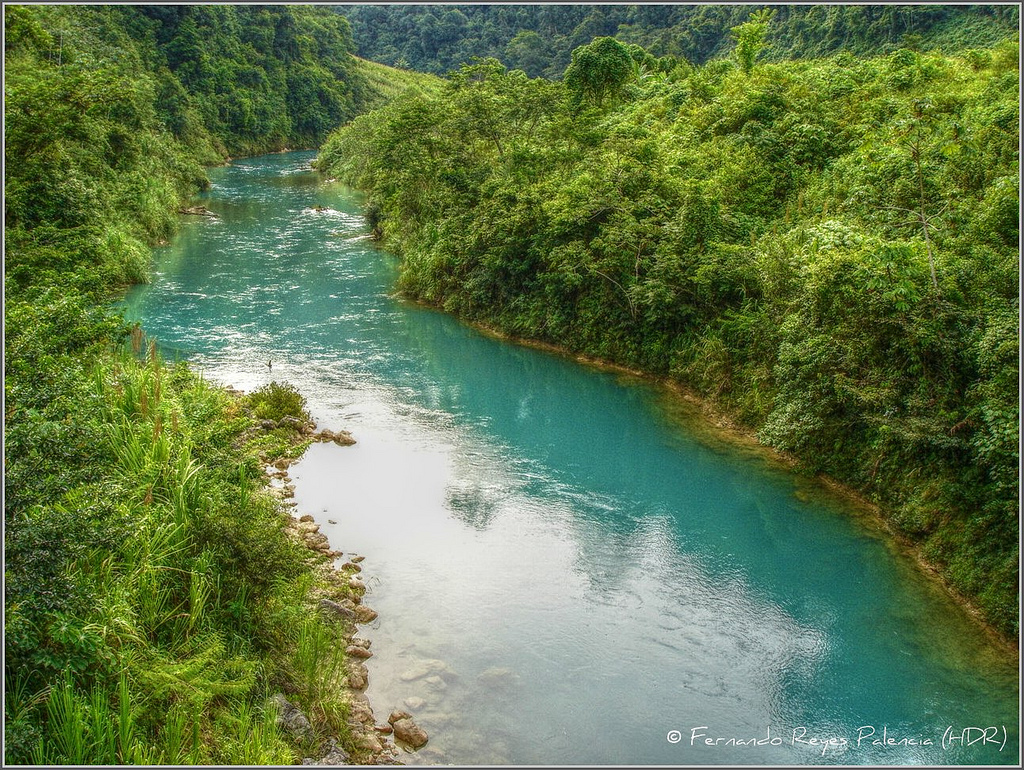
- Native name: Río Chixoy (Spanish)

Location
- Country: Guatemala

Physical characteristics
- Source
  - location: Quiché Department, Guatemala
  - coordinates: 14.985389°N 91.219165°W
  - elevation: 2,000 m (6,600 ft)
- Mouth
  - location: Confluence of Usumacinta River and Pasión River
  - coordinates: 16.481060°N 90.543121°W
  - elevation: 160 m (520 ft)
- Basin size: 12,150 km^{2} (4,690 sq mi)
- Discharge
  - average: 551 m^{3}/s (19,500 cu ft/s) at San Agustín Chixoy

The Chixoy River or Río Chixoy is a river in Guatemala. The river is called the Río Negro from its sources in the highlands of Huehuetenango and El Quiché until it reaches the Chixoy hydroelectric dam (located at 15.281536°N 90.490952°W), where the Río Salamá and Rio Carchela converge with the Río Negro. After the Chixoy dam, the river is called Río Chixoy and flows northwards, marking the departmental limits between Alta Verapaz and El Quiché, until it reaches the border with Mexico. It continues along the border for another 113 kilometres (70 mi) as the Salinas River until it finally converges with the Pasión River (at 16.481193°N 90.544167°W) to form the Usumacinta River which flows into the Gulf of Mexico.

The Chixoy river's water discharge of 551 cubic metres per second (19,500 cu ft/s) is Guatemala's highest. This was one of the main reasons for selecting this river for the construction of the Chixoy Hydroelectric dam. Guatemala's National Institute for Electricity (INDE) is planning the construction of another hydroelectric dam on the Chixoy river. The proposed location of the Xalalá hydroelectric dam is situated at 15.692833°N 90.786361°W in the municipality of Ixcán, El Quiché.

== See also ==
- Chixoy hydroelectric dam
- Río Negro massacres
