= Irrigation in Guatemala =

Irrigation in Guatemala dates back to the colonial era, but the most important developments were introduced by multi-national fruit companies in the 1920s where they irrigated up to 22,000 ha. Since 1957, the government of Guatemala has planned and executed 27 major irrigation projects covering about 15,300 ha and 2,800 irrigators. During this same time period, private initiatives irrigated another 36,500 ha of traditional crops such as bananas and sugarcane. Between 1979 and 1990, another 2,489 ha of small scale irrigation projects were developed for non-traditional products. These projects proved to be very efficient and successful as they utilized low-cost spray irrigation methods. In 1990, there were 76,365 ha under irrigation. During the 1990s, irrigation coverage increased and by 1998, there were 129,803 ha. In 2002, approximately 169,300 ha were under irrigation.
