= Salamá River =

Location
- Country: Guatemala

Physical characteristics
- Source
  - location: Baja Verapaz
  - coordinates: 15°08′08″N 90°12′27″W
  - elevation: 1,700 m (5,600 ft)
- Mouth
  - location: Tributary of the Chixoy River
  - coordinates: 15°16′53″N 90°29′27″W
  - elevation: 750 m (2,460 ft)
- Basin size: Gulf of Mexico

The Salamá River is a river in Guatemala. It is a tributary of the Chixoy River. The river is fed by a number of streams running down the slopes of the Sierra de las Minas and Sierra de Chuacús and flows in a north-westerly direction through the town of Salamá until it joins the Chixoy River.
