= Acyclic dependencies principle =

The acyclic dependencies principle (ADP) is a software design principle defined by Robert C. Martin that states that "the dependency graph of packages or components should have no cycles". This implies that the dependencies form a directed acyclic graph.

== Example ==
Circular dependency example

In this UML package diagram, package A depends on packages B and C. Package B in turn depends on package D, which depends on package C, which in turn depends on package B. The latter three dependencies create a cycle, which must be broken in order to adhere to the acyclic dependencies principle.

== Types of dependencies ==
Software dependencies can either be explicit or implicit. Examples of explicit dependencies includes:

- Include statements, such as #include in C/C++, using in C# and import in Java.
- Dependencies stated in the build system (e.g. dependency tags in Maven configuration).

Examples of implicit dependencies includes:

- Relying on specific behaviour that is not well-defined by the interface exposed.
- Network protocols.
- Routing of messages over a software bus.

In general, it's considered good practice to prefer explicit dependencies whenever possible. This is because explicit dependencies are easier to map and analyze than implicit dependencies.

== Cycle breaking strategies ==
It is in general always possible to break a cyclic dependency chain. The two most common strategies are:

- Dependency inversion principle
- Create a new package, and move the common dependencies there.

== See also ==
- Package principles
- Circular dependency
