= Association for the Development of Pakistan =

US-based non-profit organization

The Association for the Development of Pakistan (ADP) is a non-profit organization which works to enhance lives of the poor, neglected and underprivileged of Pakistan by providing support for social development projects in infrastructure, environment, healthcare, education, gender equality, labor and food rights.

ADP is headquartered in Boston, Massachusetts and has local chapters in California and Washington DC. ADP is recognized as a 501 (c) non-profit by the Internal Revenue Service.

== Response to earthquake in Northern Pakistan in October 2005 ==
After the October 8, 2005 earthquake in Northern Pakistan, ADP raised funds for immediate relief and long term redevelopment. According to its website, ADP raised more than $400,000 for earthquake relief in less than two months.

== Projects ==
The organization has worked on Cataract Surgeries Equipment at the Layton Rehmatulla Benevolent Trust (LRBT) hospital in Mansehra. This project is now in post implementation monitoring mode.

The second project was related to funding for Primary School in Kharo Chan, Thatta District of Sindh. This project was implemented with partner organization Action for Humanitarian Development (AHD).
