= Agua del Pueblo =

Guatemalan non-profit organization

Agua del Pueblo (AdP) is a private, non-profit, non-denominational and Guatemalan organization. AdP has completed more than 500 integrated rural water, sanitation, and community development projects serving more than 1,000 communities and their 500,000 Guatemalan residents. AdP is the oldest non-governmental organization focused on rural water supply and sanitation in the world.

== Establishment ==
A team of young, international volunteers founded "Agua del Pueblo" in 1972 in San Lucas Tolimán, Sololá, Guatemala. Agua del Pueblo (AdP) is a private, non-profit, non-denominational organization. Agua del Pueblo was incorporated in 1973 in the State of Missouri as "The People's Consultants. The US Internal Revenue Service classifies the People's Consultants as a 501(C)(3) public charity. Researchers have studied the impact of AdP projects on economic development, community development and health. Agua del Pueblo's headquarters is in Quetzaltenango, Guatemala, and has regional offices in Coban, Alta Verapaz and Poptun, Peten.

== Mission ==
AdP's prime directive is to promote, advise, direct and generate financing for non-profit activities related to community development and the introduction of potable water, latrines and other aspects of environmental sanitation in rural and urban communities. AdP's aims are to: a) Build potable water and sanitation systems; b) Promote rural and urban development. c) Cooperate with any organization in drinking water, sanitation, education and community development, including training of appropriate personnel. d) Research the impacts of such projects on public health and economic development and e) Participate in international, state, municipal or private projects with similar goals.

AdP focuses on the poorest of the poor throughout the highlands of Mayan Guatemala. For that reason, AdP's board prioritized the departments of San Marcos, Huehuetenango, Quiché, Totonicapan, Quetzaltenango, Solola, Retalhuleu, Suchitepequez, Chimaltenango, Alta Verapaz, Baja Verapaz and Peten. AdP views water and sanitation projects as a means to the end of consciousness-level raising and rural development. AdP favors projects based on renewable energy with minimal operation and maintenance requirements. Education and community organization form the foundation of AdP's work.

The Guatemalan government incorporated the Association of Agua del Pueblo on May 22, 1981 and registered the Association on 6 July 1981. The Guatemalan “Association of Agua del Pueblo” is included in the Registry of the Municipality of Quetzaltenango, Guatemala, Book 1 NGO.

The State of Missouri (USA) incorporated People's Consultants – Agua del Pueblo-USA (web site) in 1973. AdP’S founders established the People's Consultants to support AdP's work around the world. The US Internal Revenue Service recognizes the People's Consultants as a 501(c)(3) non-profit organization.

== History ==
In 1972, volunteers from the San Lucas Mission, the Maryknoll's (Father Bill Woods and Dave Hennessey's) Ixcan Project and San Carlos University's school of social work (Dr. Sayra Cabrera) founded Agua del Pueblo. Father John Goggin sponsored AdP's first water project in Tzalamabaj, San Lucas Toliman. Sr. Benito Pic directed the project. Sr. Pic's son, Don Oscar Pic Solís, eventually became the first re-elected mayor of San Lucas Toliman.

With the help of Jerry Carmody, Bruce Clemens incorporated the organization in St Louis Mo. Jerry was in Law School at St. Louis University. Ms. Louise Clemens was the first registered agent. The Board included Tom Gullette, Bill Copacino and Bruce. In order better describe the breadth of Agua del Pueblo's (AdP's) goals, the Board incorporated the organization under the name “The People's Consultants”. The name was later modified to “The People's Consultants aka Agua del Pueblo USA”.

Monsenor Gregory Schaffer led AdP's next project in Pampojila and Panimaquib was one of the first rural pumping water supply project in Guatemala (Karp, Cabrera and Cabrera). The project had a significant impact on improving the plight of indentured servants in Guatemala's south coast. Sr. Andres Tos Toy led the first successful strike against a large absentee landlord (Don Oscar Dias, owner of San Andres Pampojila).

One of the original goals was to “Guatemalize” AdP. In 1979, AdP began incorporation as an independent Guatemalan non-profit “Asociacion Pro Agua del Pueblo ApAdP”. Lic. Carlos Gomez was the first Director of the AdAdP.

== Accomplishments ==
Agua del Pueblo has:

- Built more than 500 drinking water projects with a comprehensive methodology, sanitation and community education.
- Built more than 25,000 sanitary excreta disposal solutions.
- Developed micro-irrigation projects that focus on food autonomy.
- Helped more than 500 thousand people with water projects
- Created 12 micro regions representing more than 200 communities.
- Recognized as the first Non Governmental Organization focused on water, sanitation and community development in the world.

== Water Infrastructure Development in Engineering ==
In the realm of engineering, significant expertise has been directed toward the development of water infrastructure, as suggested by the nomenclature of the involved entities. Historically, the initial focus of these engineering projects predominantly revolved around spring captured gravity systems, particularly in the early stages of development. These projects were often regarded as the 'low hanging fruit' due to their relative ease of implementation.

One of the most notable attributes of these spring captured gravity systems is their remarkably low operational and maintenance costs. This aspect has been a defining characteristic, contributing to their popularity and widespread adoption in various engineering projects. Despite the minimal costs, a unique financial model is employed to sustain these systems.

Integral to the sustainability of these water infrastructure projects is the inclusion of a community-based financial contribution model. In this model, each beneficiary family is required to pay a monthly fee. This fee, colloquially referred to as a "community tax," is specifically designated for the ongoing operations and maintenance of the water systems. This approach ensures a steady stream of revenue for the upkeep of the infrastructure, thereby guaranteeing its long-term functionality and reliability.

== USAID Grant ==
The US Agency for International Development recently awarded a grant to Agua del Pueblo in 2022. The grant that was given was a Global communities five-year grant (worth 15 million dollars) to support the departments of Alta Verapaz, Huehuetenango, and Quiche. The program is also to support the governance of local Water and Sanitation (WASH) systems. This goes along with the mission of USAID Bureau for Latin America and the Caribbean, which is to help Latin America become more peaceful, secure, and prosperous by assisting the governments and enhancing the private sector.

== Sanik Ya and Chitulul, San Lucas Toliman ==
There was a water project in Sanik Ya and Chitulul to provide water to 100 families to allow them to move to this area. This land was donated to "Poorest of the Poor" by Greg Schaffer, the leader of the local missionary at the time from his parish community development fund. With support from various groups such as rotary international, various Furman engineering students, and other contributors, a sustainable water project was built. This allowed for the residents to grow coffee, which allows the residents to make money after a certain amount of sacrificed effort to become profitable. One measure to show the extreme poverty in this community is the socio-economic survey that showed that the residents lived on 4.5% of the income of an average Guatemalan citizen.
