= California Department of Alcohol and Drug Programs =

The California Department of Alcohol and Drug Programs (ADP) was a California state agency concerned with substance abuse prevention and treatment. Created by the California Legislature in 1978, ADP brought together the Governor's Office of Alcoholism and the California Department of Health's Division of Substance Abuse to form the single state authority for substance abuse prevention and treatment, and is currently within the auspices of the California Health and Human Services Agency. In this capacity, ADP provided leadership and policy coordination for the planning, development, implementation, and evaluation of a comprehensive statewide system of alcohol and other drug (AOD) prevention, treatment and recovery services. As of July 1, 2013, functions of ADP were transferred to the Department of Health Care Services.

== Overview ==
The Department of Alcohol and Drug Programs (ADP) was established upon enactment of the Health and Safety Code, Division 10.5, Sections 11750, et seq., (Stats. 1979, Ch. 679). It is designated as the Single State Agency (SSA) responsible for administering and coordinating the State's efforts in alcohol and drug abuse prevention, treatment, and recovery services. ADP is also the primary state agency responsible for interagency coordination of these services.

In partnership with California's 58 county alcohol and drug program administrators and in cooperation with numerous private and public agencies, organizations and individuals, ADP provides leadership and coordination in the planning, development, implementation and evaluation of a comprehensive statewide alcohol and drug use prevention, intervention, detoxification and treatment and recovery system. The department utilizes each of the 58 county alcohol and drug programs as the broker of service. The counties in turn are able to provide services to clients either directly or by contracting with local service providers. California enjoys a statewide treatment, recovery and prevention network consisting of over 850 public and private community-based service providers which serve approximately 300,000 clients annually.

Aims include leading efforts to reduce alcoholism, drug addiction and problem gambling in California by developing, administering and supporting prevention, treatment and recovery programs and having Californians understand that alcoholism, drug addiction and problem gambling are chronic conditions that can be successfully prevented and treated.

== Organization ==
The Department of Alcohol and Drug Programs is organized into five divisions and eight offices. The department does not have any boards or commissions.

ADP has approximately 326 permanent staff and oversight responsibilities for an average annual budget of more than $600 million. The department manages and administers both state and federal monies, including the federal Substance Abuse Prevention and Treatment (SAPT) Block Grant, a major source of funding. ADP also manages the Drug Medi-Cal benefit program, which has expanded to more than $115 million yearly.

== Core Programs ==
ADP supports four core program areas of major activities: Prevention, Treatment, Quality Assurance, and Information/Education. Critical Department functions for those core programs include, but are not limited to the following:

- Directing statewide prevention and treatment programs to address AOD problems and problem gambling.
- Developing and implementing AOD abuse prevention strategies.
- Providing and administering funds to counties for cost-effective planning and implementation of local AOD prevention and treatment programs.
- Reviewing and approving county AOD program contracts and granting applications submitted for state and federal funds allocated by ADP.
- Certifying and licensing AOD programs and counselors.
- Developing and enforcing standards to ensure levels of service quality for AOD programs statewide.
- Providing public information on AOD programs and services.

=== Response to SACPA ===
In November 2000, passage of Proposition 36, the Substance Abuse and Crime Prevention Act (SACPA), placed increased responsibility on ADP by significantly changing the way the agency and the entire AOD field provide services for addicts.

As a result of Proposition 36, which requires first- or second-time nonviolent adult drug offenders to receive treatment rather than incarceration, ADP established the Office of Criminal Justice Collaboration. More than 150,000 individuals have been referred to treatment under SACPA, which was initially funded at an annual appropriation of $120 million, since the program's inception. SACPA has undergone four annual program evaluations and one cost-benefit analysis, conducted by the University of California, Los Angeles (UCLA). This study, the largest and most compelling examination of addiction ever performed in California, tracked the progress of more than 60,000 addicts, using a 30-month period both before and after the implementation of Proposition 36.

UCLA researchers found that participation in SACPA resulted in substantially reduced incarceration costs for many offenders, particularly those who completed treatment. These individuals are less likely to re-offend and more likely to remain drug-free and employed. Since treatment completion rates varied significantly from county to county, the report recommended that incentives be considered for counties that demonstrate success in treatment, retention and completion. Performance-based funding will encourage counties to adopt best practices and program improvements. Most importantly, the UCLA study revealed that while SACPA can be improved, the results justified continued funding for the program.

=== Gambling ===
In addition to the responsibilities outlined above, ADP administers statewide problem gambling prevention services and programs through its Office of Problem Gambling, which was established in 2003 as a result of Assembly Bill 673. The agency has placed an emphasis on prevention while conducting baseline studies to further define the problem and improve services. ADP also oversees the Driving Under-the-Influence Program (DUI), including licensing, regulatory and fee issues, and public information, for the nation's most populous state. In its leadership role, the department has been charged with the task of facilitating collaboration with California's 58 counties, other state-level departments, local public and private agencies, providers, advocacy groups, and individuals to establish standards for a statewide AOD service delivery system that supports all Californians.

"The Department of Alcohol and Drug Programs is responsible for administering prevention, treatment, and recovery services for alcohol and drug abuse and problem gambling."

== See also ==
- California Department of Alcoholic Beverage Control
