= Punta de Manabique =

Peninsula and wildlife refuge in Guatemala

Punta de Manabique Wildlife Refuge
- Interactive map of Punta de Manabique; Wildlife Refuge
- Location: Izabal, Guatemala
- Coordinates: 15°55′56″N 88°34′08″W
- Area: 1,299 km^{2} (502 sq mi)
- Established: Decreto No. 023-2005 [1999]
- Visitors: allowed
- Operator: CONAP / FUNDARY

Punta de Manabique is a small peninsula that separates Amatique Bay from the Gulf of Honduras. It is located on Guatemala's east coast, some 20 km north of Puerto Barrios (15.933039°N 88.569088°W).

The peninsula was declared a wildlife reserve in 1999. The reserve is covered with tropical rain forests and mangrove forests. The higher parts of the peninsula have mahogany (Swietenia spp.), Manilkara spp., Chrysophyllum spp., kapok (Ceiba pentandra), while manicaria palms (Manicaria saccifera), and palosangre trees (Symphonia globulifera) are found in swampy areas.

There is a rich diversity of molluscs, crustaceans, fishes, amphibians, reptiles (crocodile, green iguana, turtles). Many species of seabirds are found in the reserve, from the orders of Charadriiformes), Pelecaniformes, Ciconiiformes. Mammals include Baird's Tapir (Tapirus bairdii, jaguar (Panthera onca), howler monkey (Alouatta palliata), spider monkey (Ateles geoffroyi), collared Peccary (Tayassu tajacu) and white-lipped Peccary (Tayassu pecari).

$27 million gas terminal. http://www.elperiodico.com.gt/es/20110519/economia/195588

Why and, why not at Punta de Manabique. http://www.elperiodico.com.gt/es/20110522/pais/195707
