= Río Negro massacres =

Killings in Guatemala, 1980–1982

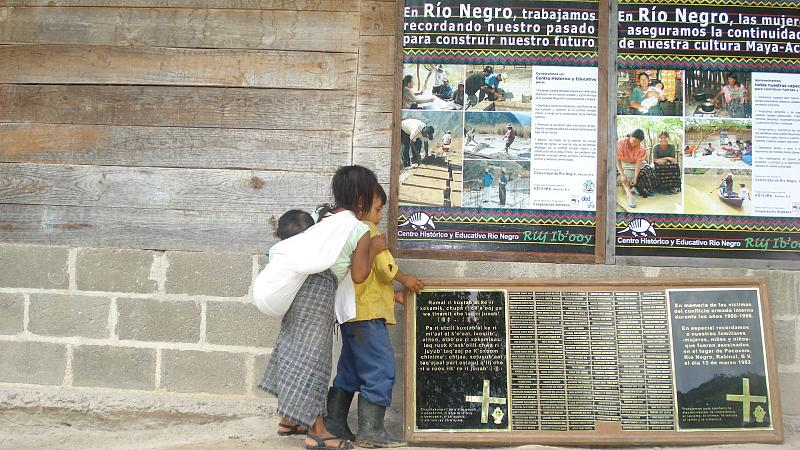
Memorial of the Río Negro massacre, in Río Negro, Guatemala

The Río Negro massacres (Spanish: Masacres de Río Negro) were a series of killings of villagers by the government of Guatemala between 1980 and 1982.

The Río Negro massacres took place during the midst of the Guatemalan Civil War, a period of time when Guatemala was experiencing intense political violence amid the Cold War. After the civil war began in 1960, Indigenous communities were continuously accused by the Guatemalan military of being supporters of guerrilla movements, and were thus seen as enemies of the state.

In 1978, in the face of the civil war, the Guatemalan government proceeded with its economic development program, including the construction of the Chixoy hydroelectric dam. Financed in large part by the World Bank and Inter-American Development Bank, the Chixoy dam was built in Rabinal, a region of the department of Baja Verapaz historically populated by the Maya Achi. To complete construction, the government undertook voluntary and forcible relocations of dam-affected communities from the fertile agricultural valleys to the much harsher surrounding highlands. Government officials initially promised that communities displaced by the reservoir created by the Chixoy dam would receive land of equal or better quality than the fertile valley that would ultimately be flooded. However, many residents reported that the resettlement areas lacked sufficient farmland and water access for agriculture, one of the primary ways these communities made an income. When hundreds of residents refused to relocate, or returned after finding the conditions of resettlement villages were not what the government had promised, these men, women, and children were kidnapped, raped, and massacred by paramilitary and military officials. The massacre, along with the many others that occurred during the 'Silent Holocaust' period of the Guatemalan Civil War, was a part of the "scorched-earth" policies meant to target Mayan communities.

More than 440 Maya Achi were killed in the village of Río Negro alone. The string of extrajudicial killings that claimed up to 5,000 lives between 1980 and 1982 became known as the Río Negro massacres. The government officially declared the acts to be counterinsurgency activities, even though local church workers, journalists and the survivors of Río Negro deny that the town ever saw any organized guerrilla activity.

== Political and legal implications ==
In 2005, a petition was filed to the Inter-American Commission on Human Rights on the Rio Negro massacre, and it is in the admissibility stage. Meanwhile, the government has sought to deal with the petitioners and victims of over 100 complaints filed against Guatemala in the IACHR, in some cases negotiating resettlement and compensation agreements. These, however, have often been conducted under the threat of violence or massacre and have largely been aborted, halted, or reneged after agreement had been reached. Even when "paid" on paper, remediation has often failed to reach the intended recipients. Entitlements such as the provision of free electricity have vanished, and since they were usually made by verbal promise alone, no documentation exists by which to defend the rights. Inadequate farm and household land provided through resettlement has contributed significantly to the severe poverty and malnutrition of the region (Center for Political Ecology, Chixoy Dam Legacy Issues Study, 2005). Some of the cases, though, have been resolved, and financial compensation has been paid to the families of a number of individuals who disappeared or suffered summary execution. In a comparable case in 2000, families who survived the 1982 Dos Erres massacre were awarded a total of 1.82 million US$ in compensation (Summary record of the 1940th meeting: Guatemala. 10/08/2001. CCPR/C/SR.1940.) along with a formal excuse from President Alfonso Portillo on behalf of the state.

In 1998, sixteen years after the Río Negro massacres, three former civil patrollers were convicted of three of the murders. At a second trial in 1999, the three were sentenced to 50 years imprisonment. Cases against 45 other civil patrollers are still open, but no charges have been brought. Nor have any military officials who planned, ordered, or participated in the massacres had to face the courts (Amnesty International, "Worldwide Appeal: Guatemala: Rio Negro massacre – Update"). Also in 1999, the Guatemalan Truth Commission (Comisión para el Esclarecimiento Histórico – CEH) issued a finding that the Río Negro massacres constituted state-sponsored genocide under Article II of the UN Convention on the Prevention and Punishment of the Crime of Genocide (CEH 1999: Conclusions, Chapter II: ¶¶ 108–123).

Confronted with government and financier intransigence and deleterious living conditions, 23 Maya Achi communities banded together in 1993 to create the Coordinating Committee of Communities Affected by the Construction of the Chixoy Dam (COCAHICH). Since its creation, COCAHICH has been quite effective at spreading its story and commissioning investigations, and somewhat less effective at bringing about legal action and just compensation. By organizing a peaceful mass demonstration outside Chixoy Dam in 2004, the communities were finally able to pressure the Guatemalan government into forming a Damages Verification Commission. The World Bank accepted an invitation to join the Commission shortly thereafter, and the Inter-American Development Bank has considered doing the same. In addition, the Guatemalan press in 2004 issued a public apology for its false and prejudicial coverage against the COCAHICH, a first step toward a broader apology by the Guatemalan government.

Also in 2004, the Centre on Housing Rights and Evictions (COHRE) filed a petition before the Inter-American Commission on Human Rights against both Guatemala and the states composing the directorial boards of the banks involved in the Chixoy dam project. One argument presented in the petition suggests these states cannot ignore or violate their human rights obligations simply by using banks as agents. A second argument posited by the petition asserts that the World Bank, as a specialized agency, may be legally bound to uphold the principles of the UN Charter, including respect and preservation of human rights. However, the Bank's charter claims legal immunity for itself and its employees. COHRE argues that such immunity is only for acts within the scope of the World Banks' operations, and human rights violations clearly lie outside of that scope. It is still unclear whether the Bank can be held liable.

As COHRE cites, the accountability of the States making up the World Bank and the Inter-American Development Bank is supported by the International Law Commission (ILC) of the UN General Assembly, which has indicated in Article 1 of the provisionally adopted Articles on the Responsibility of International Organizations that States may be responsible for internationally wrongful acts of international organizations. Article 3 adds, inter alia, that an internationally wrongful act has occurred "when conduct consisting of an action or omission: (a) is attributable to the international organizations under international law; and (b) constitutes a breach of an international obligation."

Despite Guatemala's human rights advances, in 2005 the UN Committee on Human Rights continued to be concerned about the persisting discrimination against indigenous peoples such as the Maya Achi, with regard to access to, inter alia, land ownership, work, education, health services and adequate nutrition and housing.

== Historical Clarification Commission report ==
The Commission for Historical Clarification (CEH) promoted by the United Nations released its report in 1999. In its Annex 1 ((Illustrative cases), chapter Number 10 is called "Massacre and Elimination of the Community of Río Negro, Guatemala". This part is only available in Spanish, so here is an unofficial translation from that part of the report. Full report in Spanish

I. Background: The Pueblo Viejo-Quixal hydroelectric project and resistance from members of the community of Río Negro to be evicted from their land

The community of Río Negro, settled on the banks of the river Chixoy, in the town of Rabinal, Baja Verapaz department, lived on agriculture, fishing and the exchange of goods with the neighboring community of Xococ. In the 1970s, Río Negro had a population of about 800 people, all indigenous Achís.

The lives of the people of Río Negro, and the people living on the riverbanks Chixoy, changed radically with the construction of the hydro-Quixal Pueblo Viejo. An inhabitant of the region recognized: "In the community before we were safe and in peace; but after the construction of the dam many problems emerged”.

In 1975 the National Electrification Institute (INDE) presented the project for the construction of a hydropower dam in the river basin Chixoy to solve the problem of electricity in the country, under the auspices of the Inter-American Development Bank (IDB), the International Bank for Reconstruction and Development (IBRD) and the World Bank. "The plan envisaged the flooding of more than 50 miles along the river and some tributaries, which affect nearly 3445 people from communities living on the margins". Affected communities had to be moved and resettled elsewhere. In June 1978 the Government declared the area in national emergency due to the flood caused by the building of the dam. The INDE pledged to find and deliver to the displaced equal or better lands than those that would be flooded. The community of Río Negro did not accept the proposals of the State.

The authorities tried to settle residents of Río Negro in Pacux, an arid place, and houses that broke its scheme cultural life. The peasants resisted leaving their lands. A person who gave testimony said that Río Negro "was the model community of the area, with the best organization, was the most prosperous in the region, and that was one of the reasons why this community was not as easy to fool as all others." In 1978 many people in the community moved their homes to bring them high land that would not be inundated by flood waters.

Faced with this situation, the INDE acknowledged that "the problems that occurred in the resettlement were: a) misunderstanding of the affected population on the need for the construction of the project, b) attachment to their region and the land that had affected villagers c) the difficulty in obtaining land in the region necessary for relocations that took place ".

The attachment to their region "referred to the INDE, is because the area of the river Chixoy was inhabited from the Maya Classic period (330 BC to 900 years AD) by indigenous people, and there were several religious ceremony places. The INDE noted the existence of 50 religious ceremony ancestral sites distributed throughout the valley, on the terraces bordering the river, that would be flooded.

The construction of the dam was imminent. A survivor said that INDE explained the situation to the representatives of the village in the following terms: "Even if you do not want to leave, since the President signed the contract already, you can not stop the project because it has already been approved. So it will continue, and some day you will have to leave." A legal adviser to the INDE said, referring to communities: "some left willingly and others had to be forced out. Those who wanted to negotiate, fine, and for those who did not, we used force".

By this time, the Peasant Unity Committee (CUC) taught literacy and human rights, supported and advised residents of Río Negro in their lawsuits against INDE. In 1979 the Guerrilla Army of the Poor arrived at Río Negro, held meetings with community leaders associated with CUC and spoke of revolution. A person who gave testimony says: "They said it was a struggle to make the Government leave and the Army leave, and that we must fight with machetes, with hot water, and that we were going to get farms if we did the revolution". Members of the ESP lived in the mountains and every so often visiting the community. In 1980 the hydroelectric project was still in force and the residents of Río Negro continued to resist abandoning their lands.

II. The facts: the massacres and elimination of the community

On March 5, 1980, two residents of Río Negro who were in Pueblo Viejo were accused of stealing beans from the dining rooms of the dam workers. They were pursued by two soldiers and an officer of the Policia Militar Ambulante (PMA). Upon arrival at Río Negro, the two residents began shouting that they were pursuing the military. The soldiers were rounded up and taken to the church. A community member, who was drunk, struck the officer of the PMA, who, in his eagerness to defend himself, shot and killed seven people. Immediately, the farmers reacted with stones and machetes and killed the agent. One of the soldiers, seeing the reaction of the crowd and his companion dying, left the gun and fled. The other soldier was withheld for a while, and was later freed.

The next day the Army commented on the fact saying that the community had influence from the guerrillas and that was the factor that explained their refusal to leave their lands. The military claimed in their Press bulletin: "For some time the people of the Río Negro village have become troubled by the influence of subversive elements, which have benefited from the problems of land, raised on the grounds that their land will be affected by the flooding of the Chixoy dam. This, unlike other villages which have voluntarily accepted the transfer to safer places and where they have better life expectancies".

Since that incident, members of the Army began visiting the community of Río Negro. Often the houses were searched, and people were questioned about the gun that the soldier had left on May 5 when he fled. In 1981 started the selective disappearance of the community leaders. Given these circumstances, and in order to avoid the repression of the army, community representatives went to the military zone of Coban and the military detachment of Rabinal to apologize by what happened on May 5. The reaction of the military was to accuse them of guerrillas and threaten them with death. An eyewitness says that the captain told them that the peasants of Río Negro "were already trained by the guerrillas. We were told to bring weapons because if not, they were going to make ash to Río Negro". The military never found the weapons they were allegedly looking for.

While this was happening at Río Negro, the community of Xococ was also being subjected to military repression. Collective testimony given by the community to CEH shows that, between September and October 1981, members of the army executed 18 peasants who were planting peanuts.

In February 1982 a group of armed men, possibly guerrillas, burned the market of Xococ, killing five persons. As a result of the fact that the Army identified the peasants of Río Negro with the guerrillas, residents of Xococ broke trade relations with Río Negro and declared them their enemies. Says an inhabitant of Xococ: "When the war began, friendship was lost" .

The community of Xococ asked the Army to organize the Civil Patrols (PACs). "Father Melchor [pastor of Rabinal and expert on the situation of the villages] said that there was a pact so that the people of Xococ were to cooperate fully, in exchange of not being killed". The community of Río Negro was described as a guerrilla. The Patrol Xococ, armed, trained and guided by the Army, was confronted since then with the residents of Río Negro.

The first action taken by the patrol Xococ was on February 7, 1982, on behalf of the military detachment of Rabinal. They asked some people from the community of Río Negro to come to Xococ. The head of the Patrol Xococ that received them accused them of participating in the guerrilla and of burning their market. The inhabitants of Rio Negro replied that the market was a benefit for them and that they had no reason to burn it. However, to avoid worsening the situation, the persons from Rio Negro promised to build a new market in Xococ. Finally, the patrollers retained their identity cards and ordered them to report back to Xococ the following week to recover them.

On February 13, 1982, 74 people from Río Negro(55 men and 19 women) went to Xococ to recover the identity cards. Once there, they were executed by the patrollers.

A month later, on March 13, 1982, at six o'clock, 12 members of the army patrol accompanied by 15 patrols of the Xococ village, entered the community of Río Negro. They went to every house asking for the men, but they were not in their homes because they used to spend the nights in the mountain citing security reasons. The soldiers claimed that they were with the guerrillas. Then they demanded people to leave their homes to participate in a meeting.

Meanwhile, soldiers and patrol had breakfast, eating food they found in the houses. When they finished eating, they looted the village. A person who witnessed the events said: "It took shovels, tools and tape recorders and stole everything that was in the houses".

Then they gathered the women. They played marimba music and forced them to dance, in the words of the soldiers, as they danced with the guerrillas. A number of young women were taken apart and raped.

Then, they forced the people gathered to walk about three miles up the mountain. "Throughout the walk, they beat the women a lot, they called them cows. They beat the children a lot calling them sons of guerrillas". When they got to the top of the hill Pacoxom, a member of the Army said, "right now I find it not kill a few guerrillas". Thus, they proceeded to torture and kill unarmed victims. A few hung from the trees, others were killed by machetes and others were shot. "A child like the one I carry now [said one survivor carrying an infant at the time of the interview] was carried by the hair and threw once and again against the stones". In a trench they put the corpses. "One who was still agonizing was left there as firewood; some over the others, not in order because they were thrown in there". The pit was covered with stones and branches. Around five in the afternoon the slaughter ended and they headed towards Xococ. Eighteen surviving children were taken away by the attackers towards the community.

Reports agree that 177 people – 70 women and 107 children – were killed in this action. The diligence of exhumation of corpses, practised 12 years later, established the existence, in three graves, skeletons of 143, 85 of which belonged to children, and the rest to women.

III. The subsequent events: more massacres, displacement and resettlement

On the day after the slaughter, a person who had been hiding in the bush, returned to the community to look for his wife and children: "I was crying myself, brought sheets because I thought my kids were thrown somewhere. I just saw blood, bullets. We came back and took a suitcase and went to the mountains. We remain stranded and without spirit since that day".

A group of survivors took refuge in the community Los Encuentros (located where the rivers come together with Salamá Chixoy). This community was attacked with grenades by the Army on May 14, 1982, killing of 79 peasants, event during which 15 women disappeared. All the houses were burnt.

Other survivors of Río Negro headed towards the community of Agua Fria, across the river Chixoy in the department of Quiche. On September 14, 1982, soldiers and patrols from Xococ village came to this community, proceeding to gather all people in one of the houses. Under the charge of supplying the guerrillas with materials, they fired from outside the house and then they set it on fire. As a result of this action 92 people were killed, including the elderly, children and women.

The remaining people who could escape these massacres fled to the mountains, where, with advice from ESP, lived in groups who were traveling from one side to another to avoid being detected by the Army. They maintained continuous surveillance to avoid being surprised by the PACs and soldiers. The Army destroyed all milpas and crops they found. A person who lived in the mountain said: "The Army cut off all our crops, so that we starved". In the mountains they had no medical care or medicines. They ate roots like bejuco, cojoya palm, and hunted wild animals. An undetermined number of men, women and children died of forced displacement. Many stayed in the mountains for up to five years. A declarant who refused to leave the mountain, said: "I thought, here I might die from hunger but not of a gunshot".

Months after the slaughter of March 13, 1982, the INDE began to fill the reservoir. As a declarant said: "After the slaughter, people left and the place began to fill with water, as simple as that".

After the 1983 amnesty, the survivors came down from the mountain. After going through Coban, they dispersed throughout Guatemala. Some went to Escuintla, Retalhuleu and elsewhere in Guatemala, while the rest of the peasants returned to Rabinal. They were resettled in the village of Pacux, which is located behind the military detachment of Rabinal, forced to form PACs with the aim, as they said, "to prevent the recurrence of repeat attacks by the guerrillas as Río Negro occurred in ". In Pacux the living conditions are precarious and the lands are not suitable for subsistence farming. The grounds are "poor, it is not usable nothing, or for grazing our animals".

The INDE has not yet complied with the commitment to provide equal or better land to the homeless. Nor has legalized ownership of the land where the settlements of displaced communities. Today in Río Negro live a total of twelve families, all in extreme poverty. Moreover, the inhabitants of Xococ still considered as guerrillas to the survivors of Río Negro, while they latter consider the former murderers.

On August 23, 1993, four members of the community, with the advice of the Mutual Support Group (GAM), reported the facts filed in court. On July 25, 1994, were arrested three members of the Civil Patrols who participated in the slaughter of March 13 and was raised indictment against him. The diligence of exhumation was conducted on 7 October the same year. On May 27, 1996, the hearing was adjourned at the trial, because the defence requested the application of the amnesty decree 32/88, which was denied by the courts.

After multiple delays, on Monday, November 9, 1998, began the trial that ended with the conviction, issued on November 30 by the trial court of Rabinal, which was imposed in the first instance death penalty against three former members of the CAP Xococ, accused of being the perpetrators of the slaughter of Río Negro. The lawyer for the plaintiffs told the media: "The process will remain open so that the intellectual perpetrators are also brought to justice".

On December 19, 1997, CEH asked the Minister of Defense about the slaughter of Río Negro, among other requests. Minister of National Defence responded on January 5, 1998, declined to comment, arguing that this case was subject to judicial process in the tribunals.

== Survivor testimonies ==
Survivor testimony has played an important role in documenting the events surrounding the Río Negro massacres. Testimonies from community members were collected by human rights organizations, researchers, and legal investigators in the years following the massacre and killings. These accounts helped to reconstruct the sequence of events that occurred during the two years of killings and provided evidence in legal proceedings against the accused individuals who participated in the massacres. Survivors such as Jesús Tecú Osorio, who was a child at the time of the attacks, later testified about the killing of family members and the violence that was carried out by soldiers and civil patrol members. Other survivors, including Carlos Chen Osorio, have described the destruction of the village and the loss of relatives during the attacks. Both Jesús Tecú Osorio and Carlos Chen Osorio were key witnesses to the massacre and now work for a non-governmental organization called the Asociación para el Desarrollo Integral de las Victimas de la Violence en las Verapaces Maya Achí (ADIVIMA), or, in English, the Association for the Integral Development of Victims of Violence in the Verapaces Maya Achí. This organization is working on exhuming the mass graves of the people massacred by the Guatemalan military during the Río Negro massacres.

== Present day ==
As of 2025, the Chixoy Dam remains operational and continues to generate hydroelectric power in Guatemala. The reservoir created by the dam flooded the original site of the Río Negro villages and the surrounding agricultural land where approximately 791 Maya Achí residents had previously lived and farmed. The area that once supported the Maya community is now part of the dam's reservoir and energy infrastructure.

Investigations into the displacement and violence associated with the dam project later led the World Bank to agree to provide reparations to the affected communities. Critics and community representatives have argued that the compensation process relied on many incomplete records of residents who were displaced, and did not fully account for widows and surviving children of victims. Today, many survivors of the Río Negro massacres live in the resettlement community of Pacux near Rabinal, which was created as part of the relocation program associated with the Chixoy Dam. Researchers and human rights organizations have reported that residents of Pacux continue to face economic hardship and limited access to land and basic services decades after the displacement. Survivors and their descendants have used groups such as ADIVIMA to document the massacres, support exhumations of mass graves and advocate for reparations and recognition for affected Maya Achí communities.

== See also ==
- Historical Clarification Commission
- Jesús Tecú Osorio
- ADIVIMA
