= Lachuá Lake =

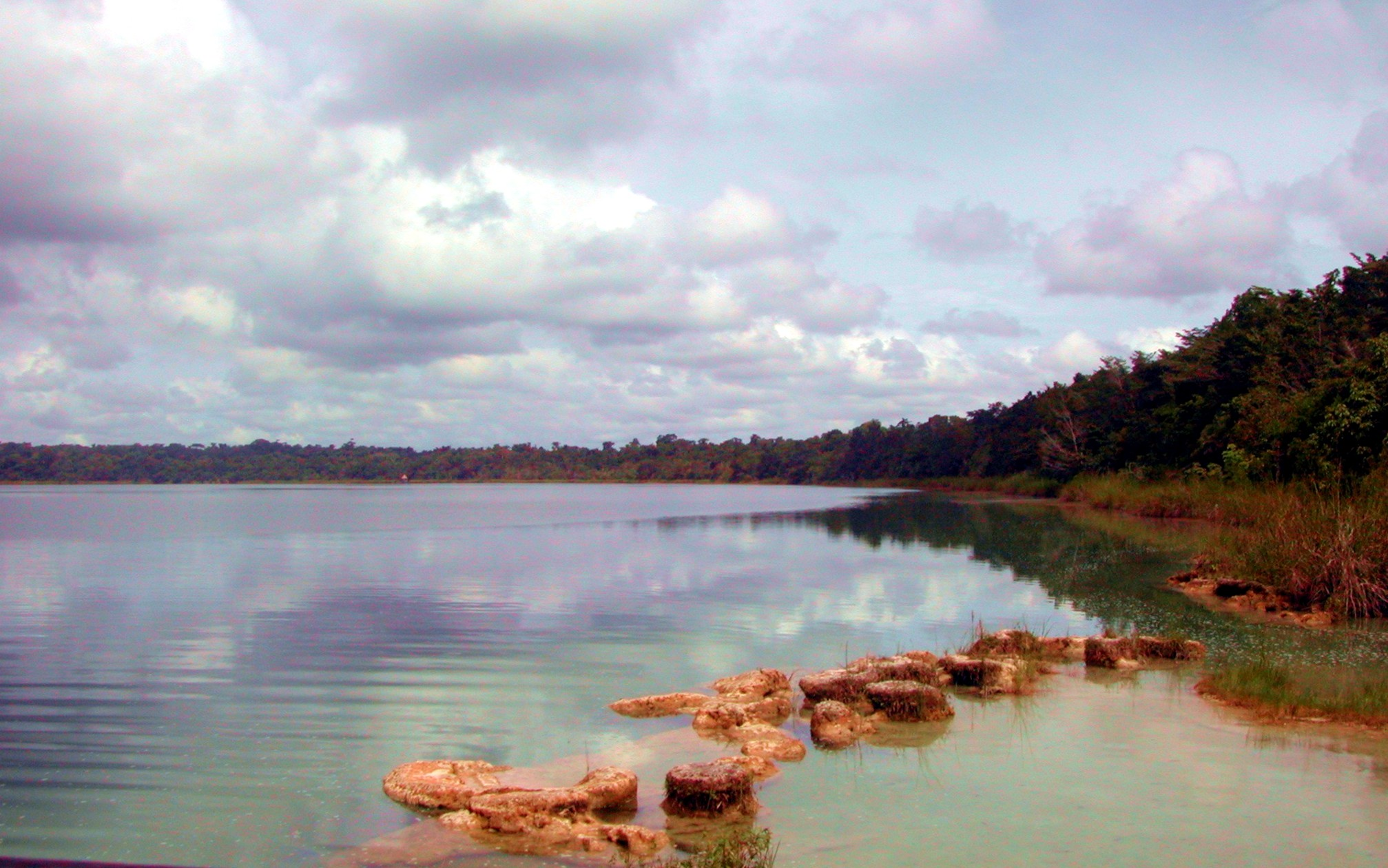

- Location within Guatemala
- Location: Cobán, Guatemala
- Coordinates: 15°55′N 90°40′W
- Type: Karstic lake (cenote)
- Primary inflows: Peyán River
- Primary outflows: Lachuá River
- Basin countries: Guatemala
- Surface area: 4 km^{2} (1.5 sq mi)
- Max. depth: 222 m (728 ft)
- Surface elevation: 173 m (568 ft)

Ramsar Wetland
- Official name: Eco-región Lachuá
- Designated: 24 May 2006
- Reference no.: 1623

Lachuá Lake is a karstic lake in Guatemala. It is located in the middle of a national park covered with tropical rain forest, northwest of Cobán, near the border between the departments of Alta Verapaz and El Quiché. The lake is near circular in shape and is probably a cenote or doline. The lake water has a slightly sulphurous smell, which may explain the origin of its name: "Lachuá" is derived from the Q'eqchi' words "la chu há" which means "the fetid water". The water contains a relatively high degree of calcite and tree branches fallen into the lake are quickly covered with a white calcite layer.

The Peyan river forms the principal water inflow and the Lachua river its main outflow.

According to officials responsible for the protection of the park border, there have been incidents of intrusion by individuals and families as well as severe cases of illegal wood chopping since 2005. Those who have dared to protest this were often intimidated and threatened. The whole area around the park has been subject to heavy deforestation for the last decades.

== National Park ==
Laguna Lachuá National Park
- IUCN category II (national park)
- Interactive map of Laguna Lachuá National Park
- Location: Alta Verapaz, Guatemala
- Area: 145 km^{2} (56 sq mi)
- Elevation: 173 m (568 ft)
- Visitors: allowed
- Operator: CONAP, Ecoregión Lachuá
- Website: lachua.org/index.php

In 1976 an area of 145 km² around the lake (15.919074°N 90.673084°W) was designated a national park. Lachuá Lake and its buffer zone were also declared a Ramsar site in 2006.

The park and adjacent buffer zone (known as "Eco-región Lachuá") is noted for its high biodiversity. With 120 species of mammals (50% of mammal species found in Guatemala), 30-40 species of reptiles, 177 bird species (40% of bird species in Guatemala), and 36 fish species it is a sanctuary for a varied fauna population. These include fish like the diadromous tarpon (Megalops atlanticus), an ample variety of biogegraphically endemic Cichlid species, reptiles like Morelet's Crocodile (Crocodylus moreletii), Orangebelly Swamp Snake (Tretanorhinus nigroluteus); and mammals, like the Jaguar (Panthera onca), Cougar (Puma concolor), Baird's tapir (Tapirus bairdii), the White-lipped Peccary (Tayassu pecari), Spotted Paca (Agouti paca), Red Brocket (Mazama americana), and Spix's Disk-winged Bat (Thyroptera tricolor), and various monkeys species including the endangered Guatemalan Black Howler (Alouatta pigra).

Waterbirds found in the park include the Wood Stork (Mycteria americana), Blue-winged Teal (Anas discors), Black-bellied Whistling Duck (Dendrocygna autumnalis), Muscovy Duck (Cairina moschata), Pied-billed Grebe (Podilymbus podiceps), Brown Pelican (Pelecanus occidentalis), Bare-throated Tiger-heron (Tigrisoma mexicanum), Snowy Egret (Egretta thula), Little Blue Heron (Egretta caerulea), Tricolored Heron (Egretta tricolor), Green Heron (Butorides virescens), Sungrebe (Heliornis fulica), Limpkin (Aramus guarauna), and Black-necked Stilt (Himantopus mexicanus),
