= Chixoy Hydroelectric Dam =

Dam in San Cristóbal Verapaz, Guatemala

Chixoy Dam
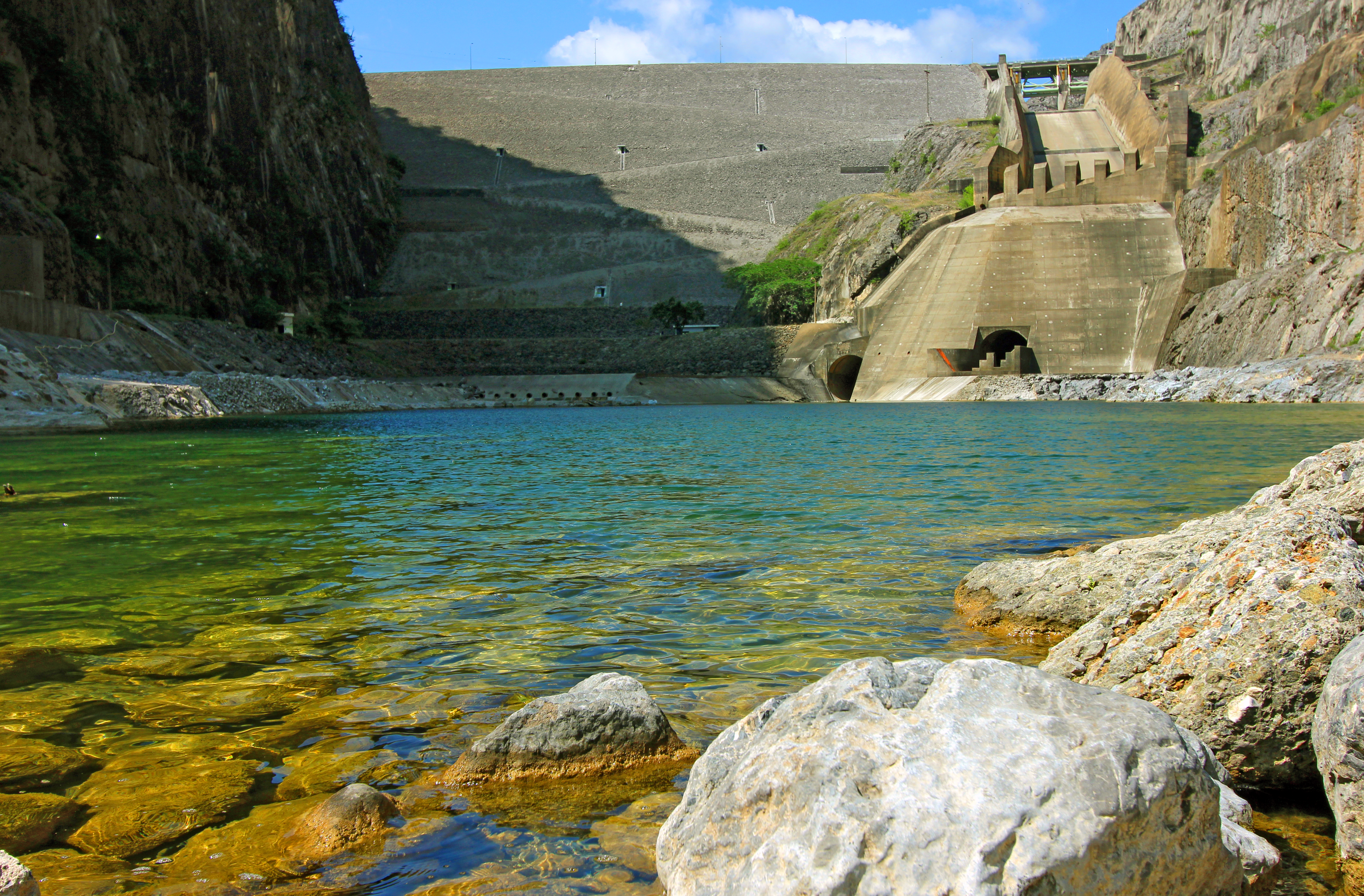
- Official name: Planta Hidroeléctrica Chixoy
- Location: San Cristóbal Verapaz (Alta Verapaz)
- Coordinates: 15.281536°N 90.490952°W
- Construction began: 1976
- Opening date: 1983
- Construction cost: US$ 944 million
- Operator: EGEE - INDE

Dam and spillways
- Impounds: Chixoy River (Río Negro)
- Height: 90 m
- Length: 250 m
- Width (base): 12 m

Reservoir
- Total capacity: 460 million m^{3}
- Surface area: 14,000 hectares

The Chixoy Dam (Spanish: Planta Hidroeléctrica Chixoy) is a reinforced concrete dam and power plant spanning the Chixoy River between the Departments of Baja Verapaz, El Quiché and Alta Verapaz, Guatemala. It is the largest structure of its kind in the country.

It was built between 1976 and 1985 and generates approximately 15% of the country's electricity.

The dam's construction was very controversial and displaced many indigenous Maya Achi peoples. Government forced relocations resulted in the Río Negro massacres which claimed up to 5,000 lives between 1980 and 1982.

== History ==
Chixoy Hydroelectric Dam bridge
- Coordinates: 15°16′54″N 90°29′27″W

Characteristics
- Width: 12 m

Construction on the dam started in 1976, with funding from the World Bank and the Inter-American Development Bank. Major redesign work was needed to address adjusted seismic criteria for the dam and tunnelling works, following the heavy 1976 earthquake. Additional costs were made to correct engineering errors, and to finance repairs to tunnel damage in the first year of operation, resulting in substantial over-budgeting. From the US$372.7 million calculated costs in 1978, the Chixoy project ended up costing US$944 million.

The construction of the dam, and its reservoir, displaced several local communities with a total population of 3,445 people. Community resettlement efforts were poorly handled by the consecutive military governments at the time. Subsequent popular protests and claims were met with extremely brutal repression by government forces, and culminated in what is known as the Río Negro Massacres. Claims have not yet been settled 25 years after the hydro-electric plant went into operation.

== Power plant ==
The hydroelectricity plant has 5 x 60 MWe pelton turbines with an effective capacity of 275 MWe, which is approximately 15% of Guatemala's total electricity production (2006) and 60% of INDE's electricity production. A 26 km long tunneling system with an elevation difference of 433 m, feeds the water to the plant's turbines.

== See also ==
- Hydroelectricity
- Río Negro Massacres
- List of hydroelectric power stations in Guatemala
