= El Tintal =

Archeological site

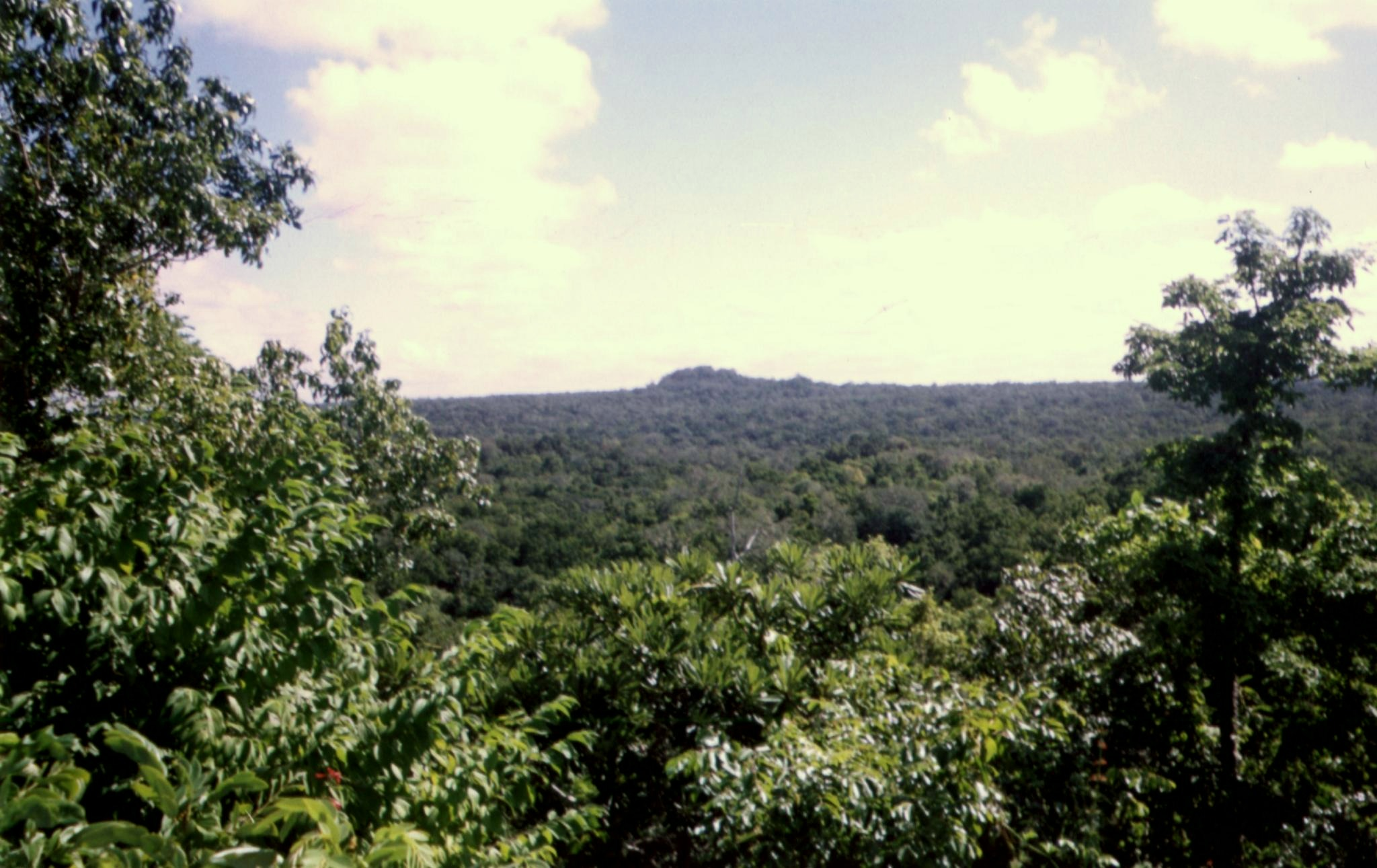
- View from the triadic pyramid at El Tintal, looking towards the pyramids of a neighbouring site.

- Location within Guatemala
- Periods: Preclassic and Terminal Classic Periods
- Cultures: Maya
- Location: San Andrés
- Region: Petén Department, Guatemala

History
- Built: Middle Preclassic
- Abandoned: Terminal Classic

Site notes
- Architectural styles: Preclassic and Classic Maya

El Tintal is a Maya archaeological site in the northern Petén region of Guatemala, about 25 kilometres (16 mi) northeast of the modern-day settlement of Carmelita, with settlement dating to the Preclassic and Classic periods. It is close to the better known sites of El Mirador (20 kilometres (12 mi) to the north), to which it was linked by causeway, and Nakbé (20 kilometres (12 mi) to the northeast). El Tintal is a sizeable site that includes some very large structures and it is one of the four largest sites in the northern Petén; it is the second largest site in the Mirador Basin, after El Mirador itself. El Tintal features monumental architecture dating to the Middle Preclassic similar to that found at El Mirador, Nakbé and Wakna. Potsherds recovered from the site date to the Late Preclassic and Early Classic periods, and construction continued at the site in the Late Classic period.

The causeway system linking the sites of El Tintal, El Mirador and Nakbé involved a significant labour investment and an enormous quantity of construction materials, indicating an accomplished engineering programme in the Preclassic Period.

Although the site's existence was known to archaeologists for decades, due to its remote location no thorough investigation of the site took place until 2004, when the Mirador Basin Project carried out the first systematic excavations.

== Location ==
El Tintal is located in the north of the department of Petén, in a remote area still covered by dense virgin rainforest and only accessible by mule trails. The site occupies a hill, with four swampy areas within the site core. The swamps of the Mirador Basin appear to have been the primary attraction for the first inhabitants of the area as evidenced by the unusual cluster of large cities clustered around them.

== Occupation ==
Ceramic analysis has revealed that El Tintal was most heavily occupied during the Late Preclassic (300 BC – AD 150) and in the Late Classic. Preclassic ceramic finds are of a type found throughout the Mirador Basin, but Late Classic ceramics are of a type distinct from those found at other sites in the basin, suggesting cultural diversion as population levels fell after the Preclassic.

== Modern history ==
El Tintal was first visited by Heinrich Berlin in the 1950s but it was not until 1970 that test pits were excavated by archaeologists Ian Graham and Joyce Marcus, of the universities of Harvard and Michigan respectively. In 1990 Richard D. Hansen carried out a rescue excavation around Stela 1. The Mirador Basin Project carried out the first systematic excavations at the site in 2004.

The site has been heavily looted, with 2154 looters' trenches cut into the mapped structures, averaging 2.54 trenches per structure. The looters unearthed thousands of burials and have left human remains, ceramics and other artifacts judged of lesser value scattered throughout the site. A great deal of damage was done by looters mistakenly looking for Classic Period burials in Preclassic structures, resulting in extensive digging when such burials were not found.

== The site ==
The Mirador Basin Project mapped 9 square kilometres (3.5 sq mi) around the monumental architecture of El Tintal, recording 850 major structures reaching up to 50 metres (160 ft) high. Wide causeways connected various parts of the site, as well as connecting the city with a network of other sites in the Mirador Basin.

Two of the largest buildings at El Tintal are triadic structures, a Preclassic Maya innovation consisting of a dominant structure flanked by two smaller inward-facing buildings, all mounted upon a single basal platform. These triadic structures have been heavily looted. These extensive looters trenches have failed to locate any tombs or burials. One of the largest pyramids in the site core is a triadic pyramid estimated to have a height of 44 metres (144 ft) with a massive base measuring 105 by 78 metres (344 by 256 ft).

The site was investigated in 1990 under the direction of archaeologist Richard D. Hansen of the University of California, Los Angeles. The investigations consisted of the rescue excavation of one of the many looters' trenches at the site, the excavated trench having been cut through a 2-metre-high (6.6 ft) mound upon the 30-metre-high (98 ft) triadic pyramid. The looters' trench had revealed a broken red sandstone stela (Stela 1), which was first reported in 1979 to archaeologists of the El Mirador Project. The remains of the stela were resting upon a stucco floor, a large shell was found nearby surrounded by pieces of jade.

A ballcourt is located north of the triadic pyramid near the centre of the site and is the largest ballcourt yet found in the Maya lowlands.

A jade plaque has been recovered from El Tintal bearing a design very similar to a design from an ear-spool from the nearby Classic Period site of La Muerta.

=== Mano de León complex ===
This complex consists of the civic centre of the city. It is completely surrounded by wide, deep ditch with an average width of 15 metres (49 ft), measuring up to 8 metres (26 ft) deep and with a total length of 2.2 kilometres (1.4 mi). Due to the presence of Preclassic residential structures along the edge of the ditch, the ditch is believed to date from that period. The ditch was likely to have been defensive in nature although it is possible that it had other functions, such as supplying water or providing a social or political boundary within the city.

The Mano de León Complex is the most heavily looted area of the city, with 945 looters' trenches mapped by the Mirador Basin Project. An important find in a heavily looted area to the southwest of the complex was that of a painted ceramic vessel in a modified Codex style and dating to around AD 700–750, in the Late Classic. It bears depictions of the Maya Maize God and painted hieroglyphs stating that it was a drinking vessel belonging to Yopaat B'ahlam, an important lord who is named in a variety of texts from Late Classic sites in the Mirador Basin.

==== Stela 1 ====
El Tintal Stela 1 was carved from red sandstone, it was found buried within a 2.5-metre (8.2 ft) structure near the northwest corner of the El Pavo pyramid in the Mano de León complex. The stela stood in the plaza for centuries after being carved.

Stela 1 was recarved sometime before the Early Classic Period, with elements of the earlier design surviving on the butt of the monument. The preserved designs on the butt include hundreds of carved lines and symbols forming graffiti in a style typical of Preclassic imagery in the region. The stela was deliberately mutilated during the Late Classic, the surviving parts of Stela 1 depict two feet in profile above a band containing other elements. The stela measures 4.5 metres (15 ft) high, 2 metres (6.6 ft) wide and 0.4 metres (16 in) thick. It is judged to predate Tikal Stela 29 on stylistic grounds, the latter bears a Maya Long Count date equivalent to a date in AD 292. El Tintal Stela 1 was associated with a circular limestone altar that had been displaced by the looters. The sandstone used for Stela 1 probably came from the Altar de Sacrificios region on the Usumacinta River and implies unusual cultural contacts with this relatively distant region.

=== La Isla complex ===
This complex contains the largest pyramid at El Tintal, measuring 50 metres (160 ft) high and known as Catzin.

=== Henequén Group ===
This group has been heavily looted, with 508 looters' trenches mapped by the Mirador Basin Project.
