= El Mirador =

Pre-Columbian Maya settlement

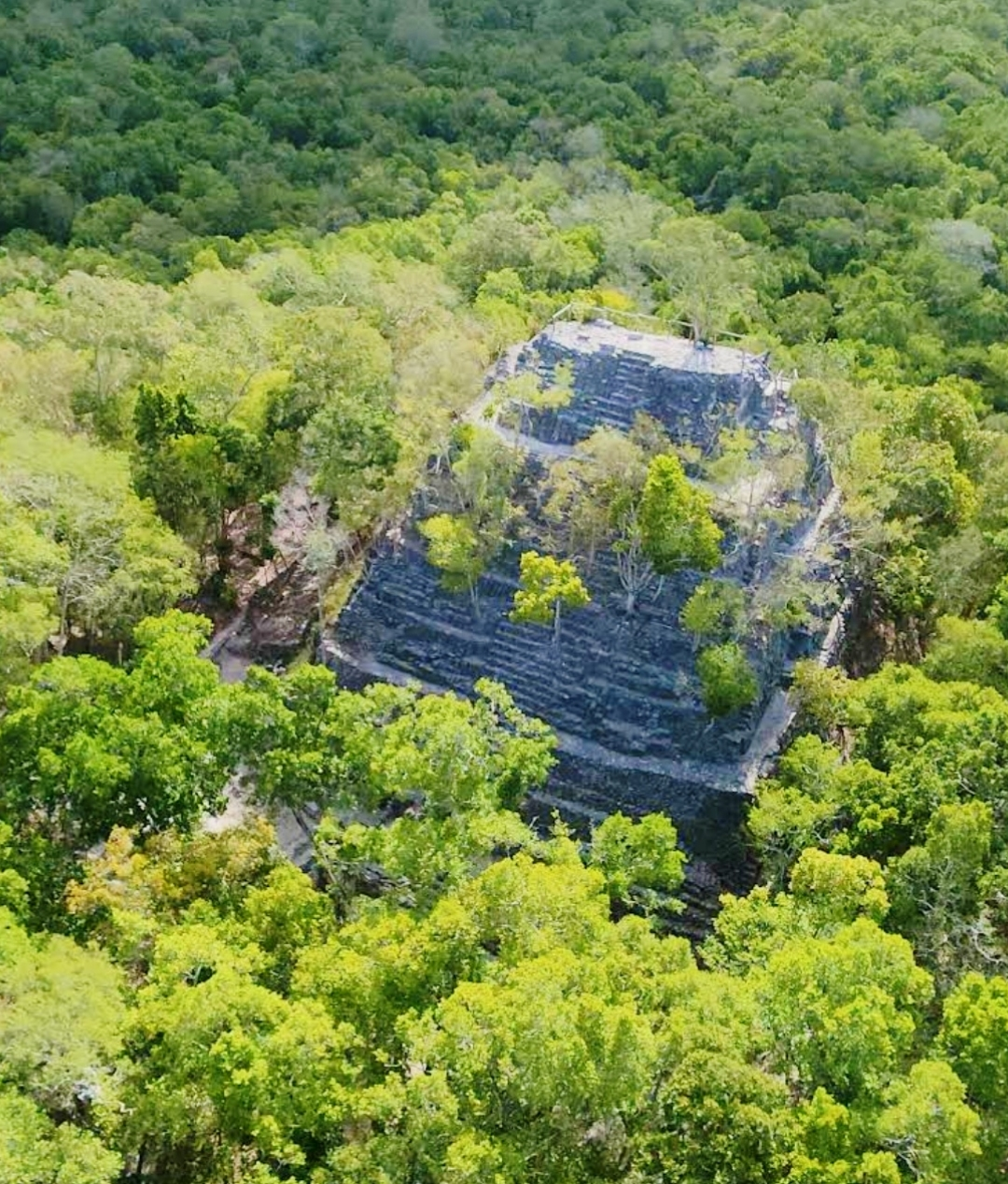
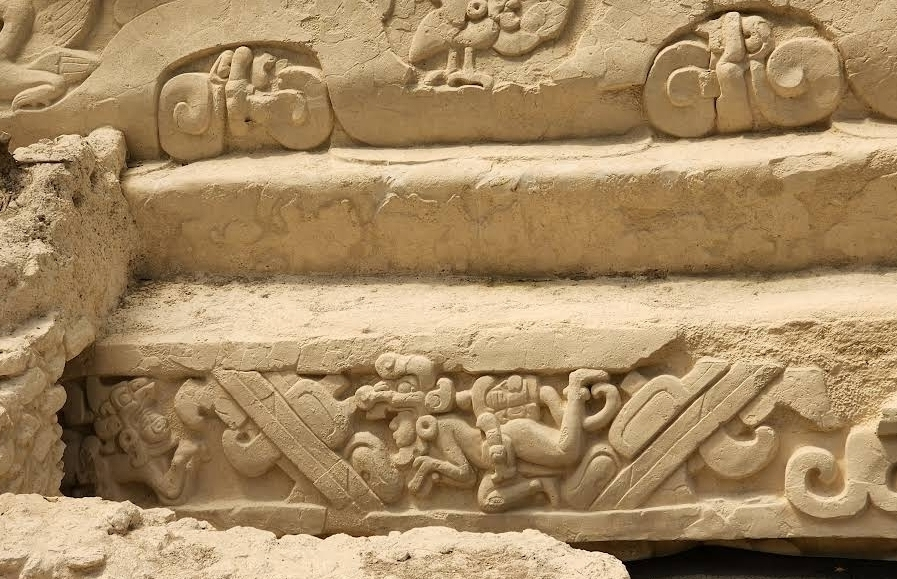
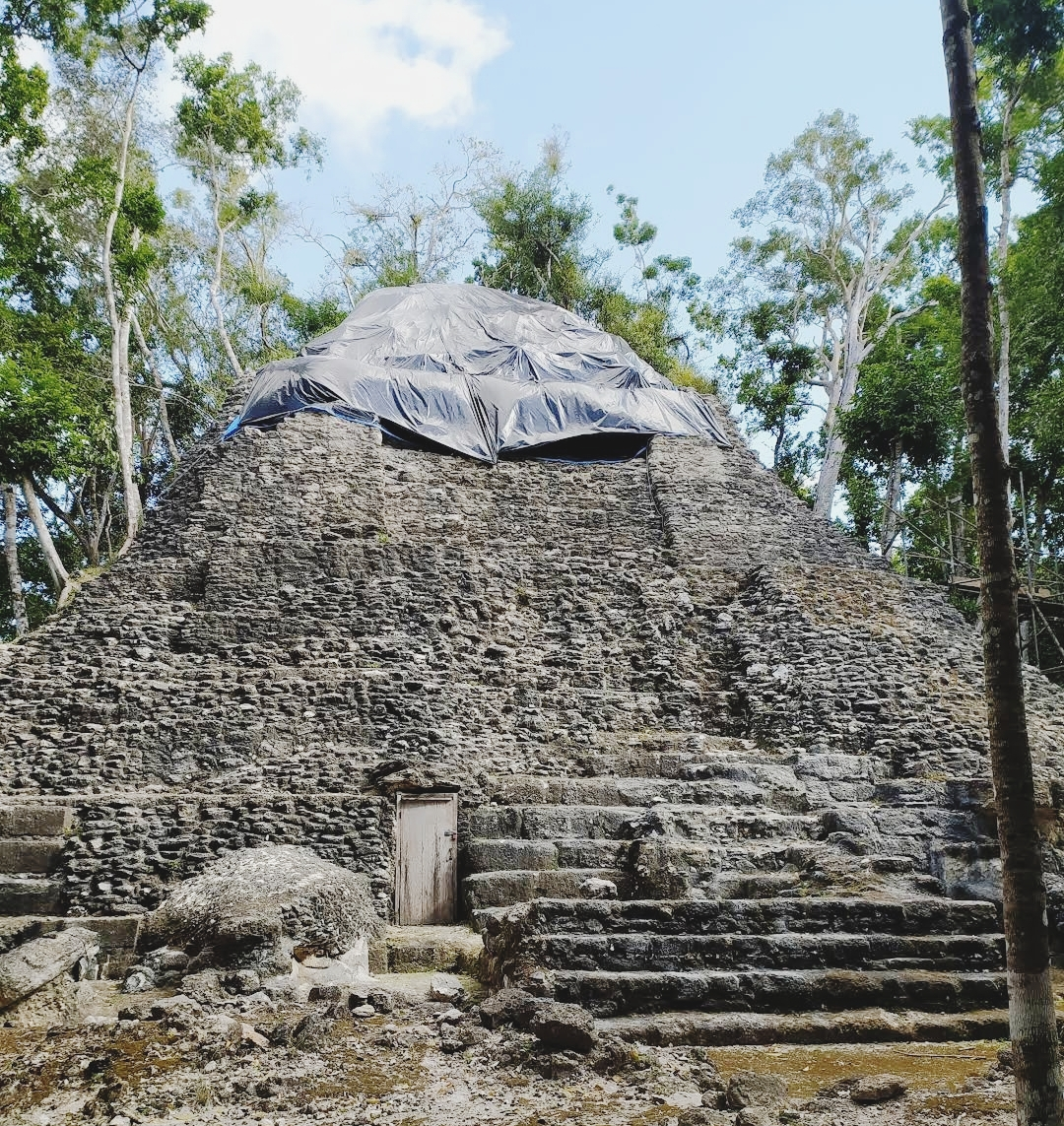
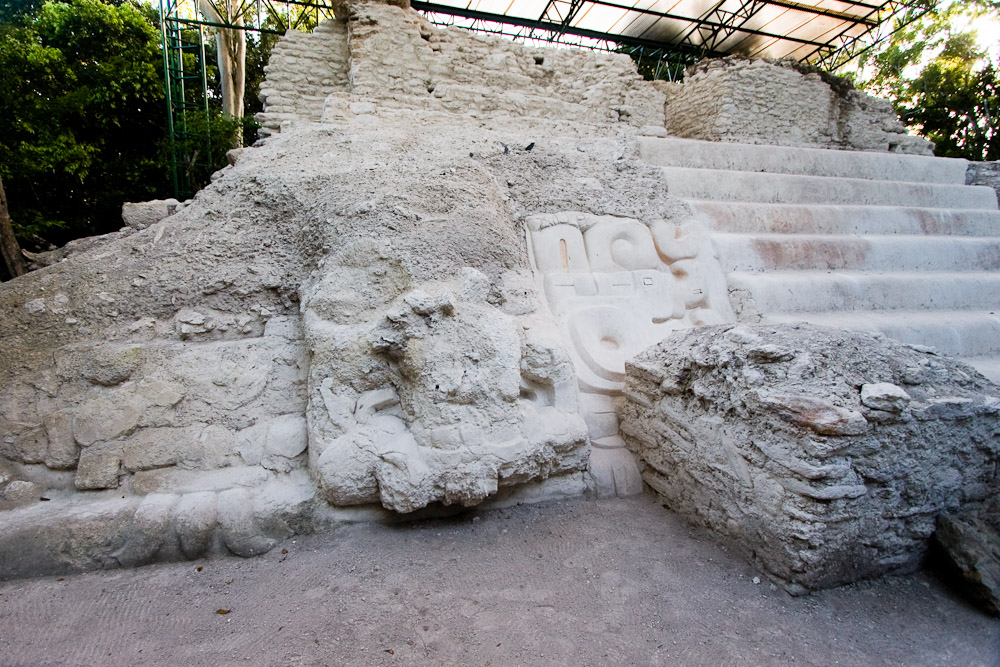
- Pyramid of La Danta Art of El Mirador Temple Jaguar Paw Temple Pyramid of La Danta in 3D

- Location within Mesoamerica Location within Guatemala
- 17°45′18″N 89°55′14″W
- Periods: Middle Preclassic to Terminal Classic
- Cultures: Maya civilization
- Location: San Andrés, Petén, Guatemala

History
- Built: 6th century BC
- Abandoned: 9th century AD

Site notes
- Architectural styles: Early Maya, Central Peten
- Archaeologists: Ian Graham, Bruce H. Dahlin, Ray T. Matheny, Carlos Morales-Aguilar

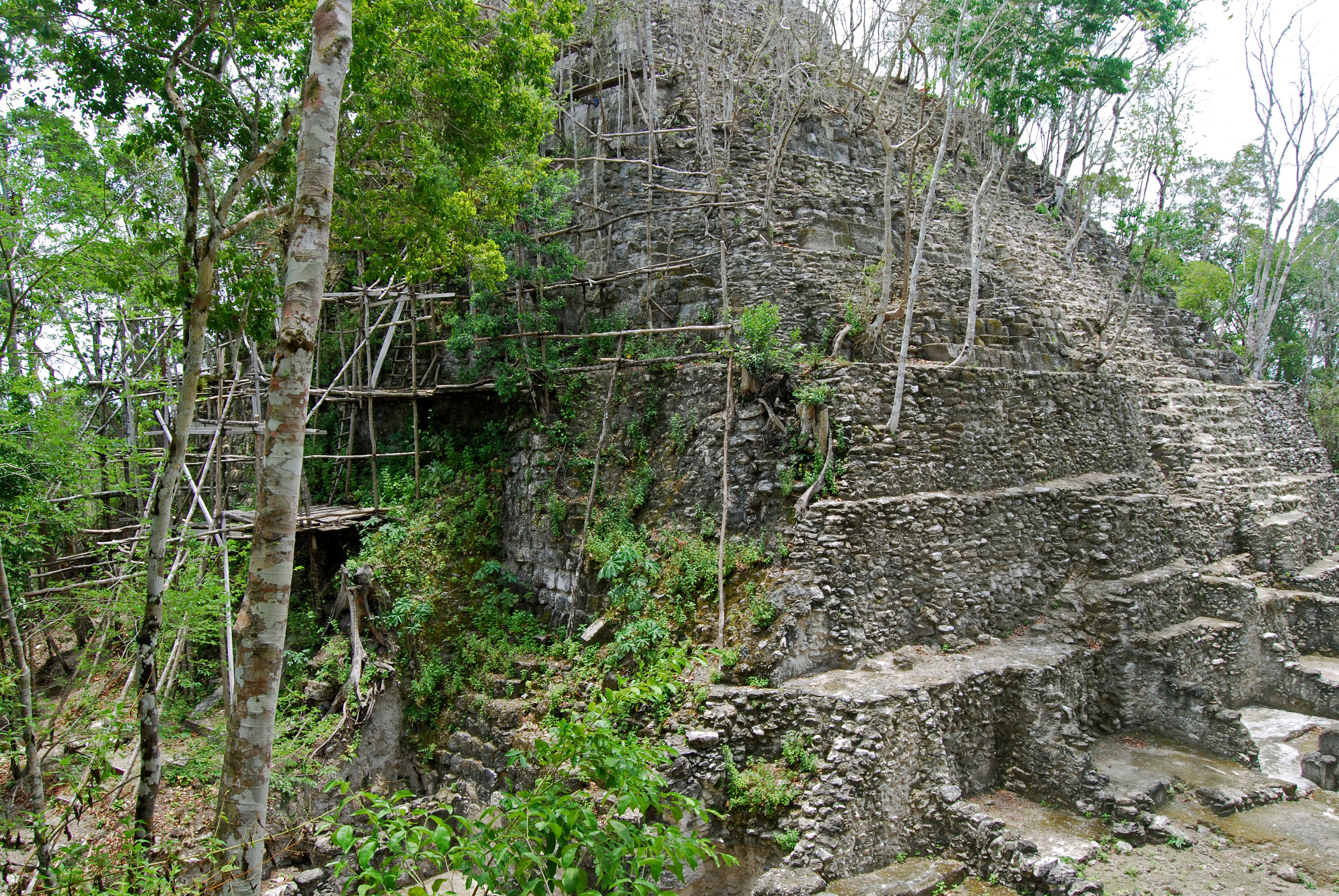
Pyramid at El Mirador

El Mirador (which translates as 'The Lookout', 'The Viewpoint', or 'The Belvedere') is a large pre-Columbian Middle and Late Preclassic (1000 BC – 250 AD) Maya settlement, located in the north of the modern department of El Petén, Guatemala. It is part of the Mirador-Calakmul Karst Basin of northern Guatemala. El Mirador is considered to be the most important complex of ancient cities from the Preclassic period. It features causeways and pyramids, among which the pyramid of La Danta stands out, one of the tallest and most voluminous in the world.

The site is estimated to comprise some 800 cities, and the location of La Danta was the epicenter of trade, religious ceremonies, and the royal residence of rulers. Furthermore, the city was interconnected with others via 13 causeways, representing its power over the other Mayan cities in the region. El Mirador has white roads measuring 40 meters wide and between 2 and 5 meters high, forming what researchers consider the world's first highway system or superhighway.

== European discovery ==
Some of the Mirador basin was surveyed in 1885 by Claudio Urrutia, who noted the presence of ruins. But El Mirador had little attention paid to it until Ian Graham spent some time there making the first map of the area in 1962. A detailed investigation began in 1978 with an archaeological project under the direction of Bruce Dahlin at Catholic University of America and Ray Matheny at Brigham Young University. Dahlin's work focused primarily on the bajo swamps and mapping, while Matheny's team focused primarily on excavations in the site center and architecture. This project ended in 1983. To the surprise of the archaeologists, it was found that a large amount of construction was not contemporary with the large Maya classic cities in the area, like Tikal and Uaxactun, but rather from centuries earlier in the pre-classic era (see: Mesoamerican chronology).

In 2003, Richard D. Hansen, a senior scientist from Idaho State University, initiated major investigation, stabilization, and conservation programs at El Mirador with a multi-disciplinary approach, including staff and technical personnel from 52 universities and research institutions from throughout the world. By August 2008, the team had published 168 scientific papers, and produced many technical reports and scientific presentations.

In the popular media, documentary films for the History Channel, National Geographic, the Learning Channel, BBC, ABC's 20/20 and Good Morning America, 60 Minutes (Australia), and the Discovery Channel were produced.

== History ==
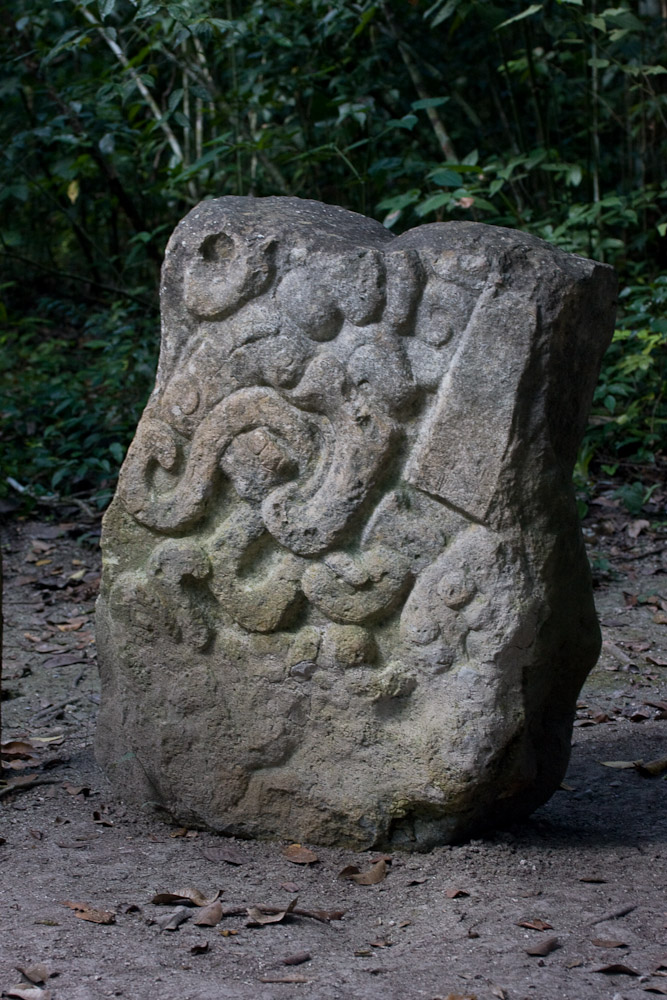
Stela 2 at El Mirador.

El Mirador flourished from about the 6th century BC to the 1st century AD, reaching its height from the 3rd century BC. Then it experienced a hiatus of construction and perhaps abandonment for generations, followed by re-occupation and further construction in the Late Classic era, and a final abandonment about the end of the 9th century. The civic center of the site covers some 10 square miles (26 km^{2}) with several thousand structures, including monumental architecture from 10 to 72 meters high.

One of the key elements for this tremendous rise in human population was the many bajos, seasonal swamps, in the region. Tropical-forest soil contains hardly any nutrients, and most of the nutrients present get washed away by rain. Yet the Maya developed a system that was highly productive. In the Mirador basin, the swamps provided the solution. By importing mud from the swamps by the thousands of tonnes, the Maya created mud-covered terraces ready for agriculture. By adding lime to the soil, they elevated the pH, making it suitable for a variety of crops: corn, squash, beans, cacao, cotton and palm. When the ground was depleted of nutrients, adding another layer of mud reinvigorated the fields.

There are a number of "triadic" structures (around 35 structures), consisting of large artificial platforms topped with a set of 3 summit pyramids. The most notable of such structures are three huge complexes; one is nicknamed El Tigre, with height 55 metres (180 ft); another is called La Danta (or Danta) temple. The La Danta temple measures approximately 72 metres (236 ft) tall from the forest floor, and considering its total volume (2,800,000 cubic meters) is one of the largest pyramids in the world. When the large man-made platform that the temple is built upon (some 180,000 square meters) is included in calculations, La Danta is considered by some archeologists to be one of the largest ancient structures in the world. Also the Los Monos complex is very large (48 meters high) although not as well known. Most of the structures were originally faced with cut stone which was then decorated with large stucco masks depicting the deities of Maya mythology. According to Carlos Morales-Aguilar, a Guatemalan archaeologist from Panthéon-Sorbonne University, the city appears to have been planned from its foundation, as alignments have been found between the architectural groups and main temples, which were possibly related to solar alignments. The study reflects an importance of urban planning and sacred spaces since the first settlers.

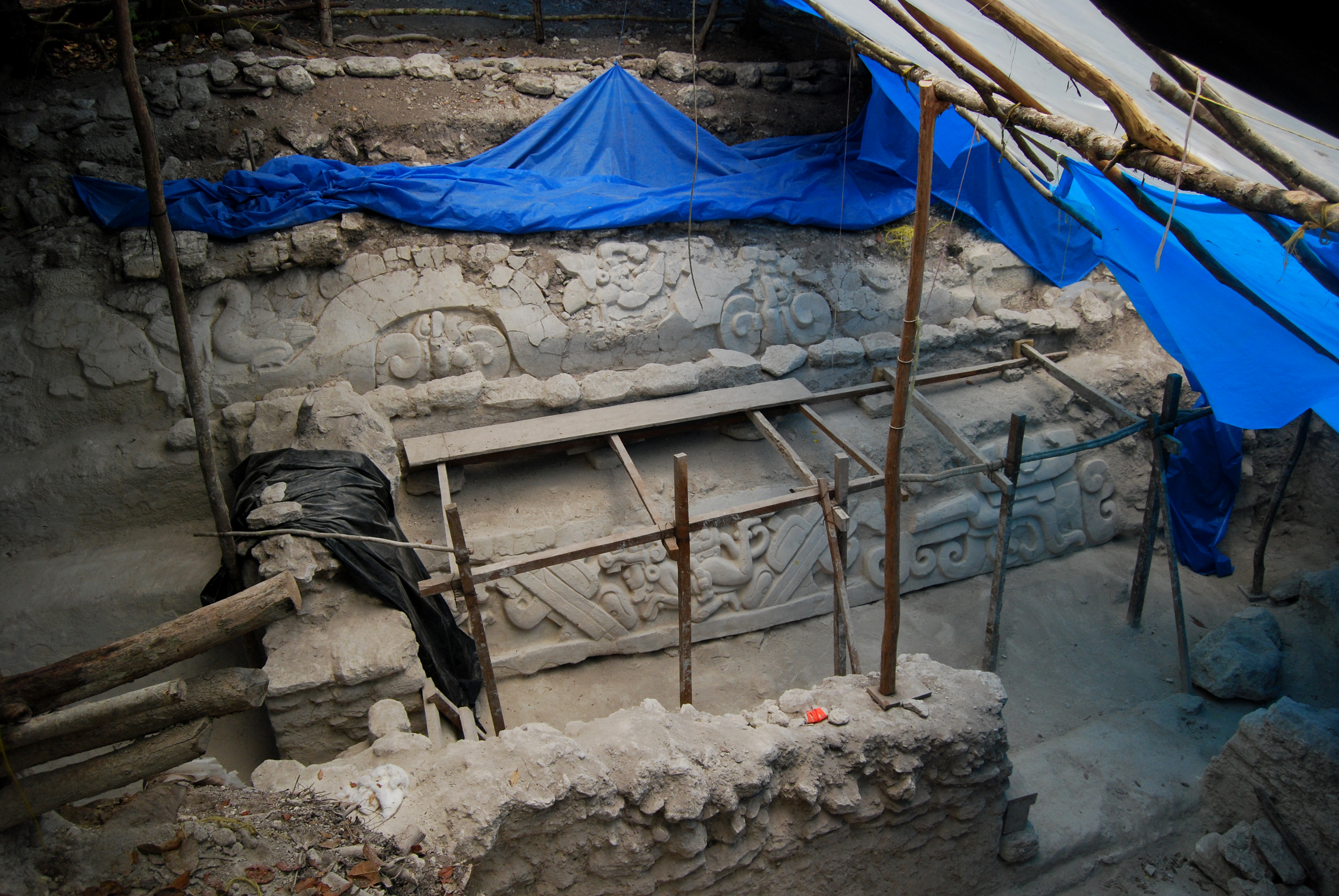
Stucco friezes at El Mirador that adorned the banks of a water-collecting system.

An additional feature of El Mirador is the quantity and size of causeways, internally linking important architectural compounds, and externally linking the numerous major ancient cities within the Mirador Basin during the later part of the Middle and Late Preclassic periods. The causeways are commonly referred to as sacbeob (the plural form of sacbe, meaning "white road" in Mayan, from sac "white" and be "road"). These are raised stone causeways rising 2 to 6 meters above the level of the surrounding landscape and measuring from 20 to 50 meters wide. One sacbe links El Mirador to the neighbouring site of Nakbe, approximately 12 km away, while another joined El Mirador to El Tintal, 20 km away.

While the city and the sister centers of the Mirador Basin thrived between 300 BC and the Common Era (AD), apparently, the site was abandoned, as were nearly all other major sites in the area, by about 150 AD. A large wall, which must have been as high as 3 to 8 meters, had been constructed on the entire northern, eastern, and southern portions of the West Group of the city prior to its abandonment in the terminal Preclassic period, suggesting a possible threat that had been perceived by this time.

Another aspect that may have led to the downfall of the system was soil erosion due to deforestation; trees were burned as part of the process of making stucco. The Maya were fond of plastering buildings, houses, floors and even ceramics with layers of lime plaster called stucco. This plaster created a nice smooth surface which facilitated painting. With this stucco, the Maya created many astonishingly beautiful artifacts, as well as smooth-walled pyramids and 'paved' roads. But a darker side to this production became evident when consumption started to evolve into conspicuous consumption. The production of lime needs a large amount of green wood. Archeologists have calculated that for the production of 1 tonne of lime cement, 5 tonnes of limestone and 5 tonnes of wood were needed.

Excavations in and around the bajos (swamps) revealed the effects of deforestation. When trees vanish, the soil becomes loose and is easily transported by water (e.g. rain). Also, water flows downhill, and the only places in the Basin where it could flow to were these bajos. The nutrient-rich muck that was so vigorously imported from the bajos was now buried under a 2 to 3-metre thick layer of sterile clay. This cut off the driving force behind the sustainable agricultural fields. When you cannot replenish your crop fields, more and more harvests start to fail. In the end the failing crop fields led to starvation and collapse of society.

In the Late Classic period, c. 700 AD, portions of the site were reoccupied on a more modest scale, with small structures nestled among the ruins of the great preclassic center. The largest structure from this time period is scarcely more than 8 meters high, and many of the preclassic buildings were plundered for stone materials for construction and lime making. The Late Classic occupants, however, were noted scribes and artists. The area of the Mirador Basin is the only known source of the "codex-style ceramics", a particularly fine polychrome ceramic consisting of black line drawings on a cream colored background. The Late Classic occupation was brief, and by about 900 AD the area was again nearly completely abandoned and remains so until the present time.

== Today ==
Richard D. Hansen, an archaeologist from the University of Utah, is the current director of the Mirador Basin Project, and according to his discoveries here, he thinks that the more than 45 mapped sites in the Mirador Basin may have formed the earliest well-defined political state in Mesoamerica.

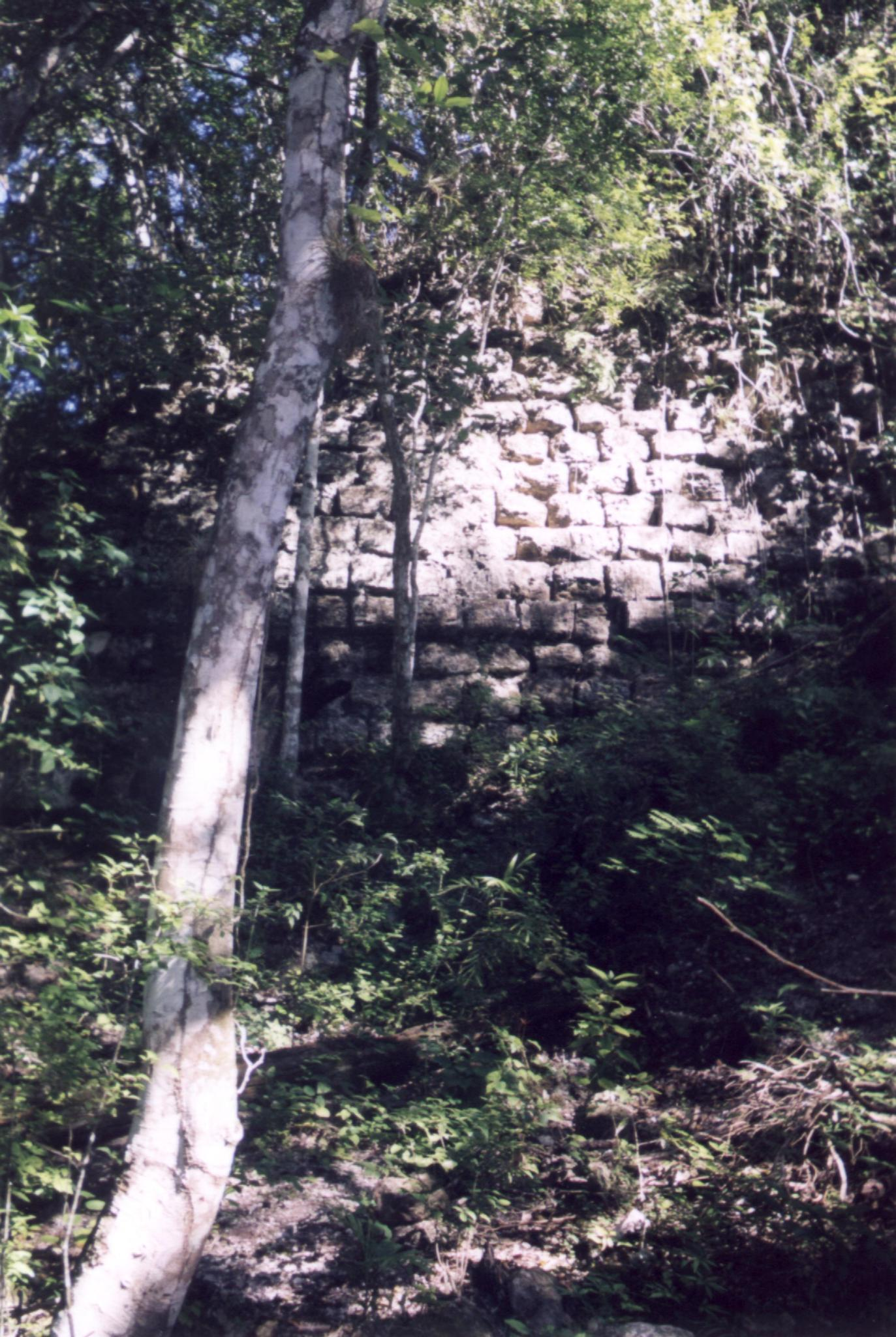
Exposed stonework at El Mirador in 2000

Although containing striking examples of Preclassic Maya civilization, the remote location of El Mirador has prevented it from becoming a popular tourist site. Major plans by the current government of Guatemala include El Mirador as an important center of the Cuatro Balam Conservation and Development project.

== Threats to Mirador ==
This large concentration of Preclassic Maya cities in Mesoamerica is threatened by massive deforestation, looting, and destruction caused by equipment used in logging road construction, which itself facilitates intrusive settlements. The Mirador Basin in the far northern Petén region of Guatemala is known for its abundance of sites, many of which are among the largest and earliest in the Maya world. Of 26 known sites, only 14 have been studied; an estimated 30 more await discovery. By the time scholars get there, looters may already have plundered them:

Trafficking in Maya artifacts is big business. George S. Stuart of the National Geographic Society has suggested that 1,000 pieces of fine pottery leave the Maya region each month, not an unreasonable estimate in light of the site damage observed. The most sought-after finds are codex-style ceramics, Late Classic (600–900 CE) black-line-on-cream pottery depicting mythological and historical events. Looters are often paid between $200 and $500 per vessel. Collectors may pay more than $100,000 for the same pieces in a gallery or at auction. At even minimal prices this amounts to a $10-million-a-month business in stolen cultural property. Collecting Precolumbian art is often viewed as a justifiable means of preserving the past. It is, in fact, a destructive and sometimes violent business, as attested to by the recent assassination in Carmelita of Carlos Catalán, a local chiclero who had become a staunch opponent of looting in Petén.

Since 2003, California-based non-profit organization Global Heritage Fund (GHF) has been working to preserve and protect Mirador. In an October 2010 report titled Saving Our Vanishing Heritage, GHF listed Mirador as one of 12 worldwide heritage sites most "On the Verge" of irreparable loss and destruction, citing deforestation, fires, major logging, poaching, looting, and narcotics trafficking as major threats to the region.

== See also ==
- Classic Maya collapse
- Jungle tourism
- K'àak' Chi'
- La Muerta
- List of Maya sites
- List of tallest ancient structures
