= Las Cruces =

Las Cruces may refer to:

== Places ==
=== Guatemala ===
- Las Cruces, Petén

=== Panama ===
- Las Cruces, Los Santos
- Las Cruces, Veraguas

=== United States ===
- Las Cruces, California
- Las Cruces, New Mexico (New Mexico's second-largest city)
  - The main campus of New Mexico State University, which is surrounded by the city
  - Las Cruces International Airport in New Mexico

== Other uses ==
- Las Cruces (band), doom metal band from Las Cruces, New Mexico
- Battle of Monte de las Cruces, in the Mexican War of Independence
