= Nakbe =

Archaeological site in Guatemala

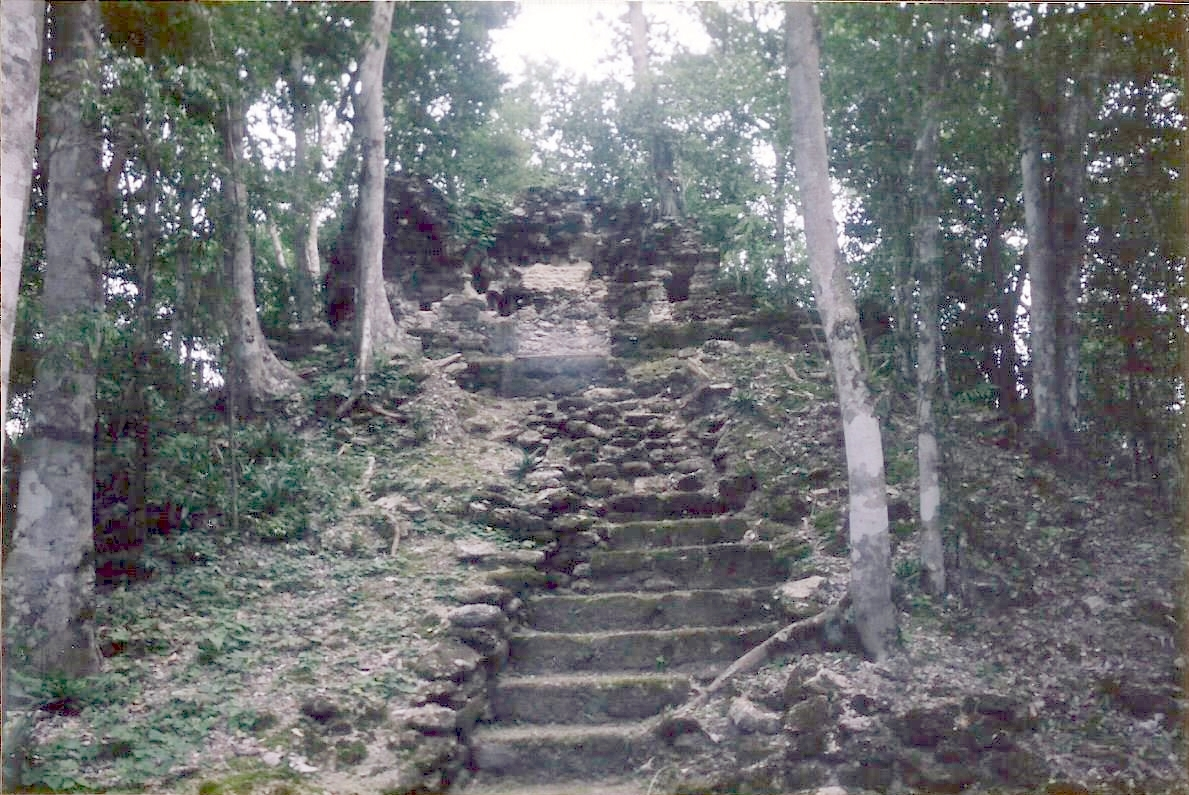
- Temple at Nakbe

- Location of the site Nakbe (Guatemala)
- 17°40′58.08″N 89°49′59.16″W
- Type: Settlement
- Periods: Early Preclassic to Late Preclassic
- Cultures: Maya civilization
- Location: Petén Department, Guatemala
- Region: Petén Basin

Site notes
- Condition: In ruins

Nakbe is one of the largest early Maya archaeological sites. Nakbe is located in the Mirador Basin, in the Petén region of Guatemala, approximately 13 kilometers south of the largest Maya city of El Mirador. Excavations at Nakbe suggest that habitation began at the site during the Early Formative period (c. 1400 BC) and continued to be a large site until its collapse during the Terminal Formative period (100–200 CE). The fall of Nakbe and El Mirador took place at roughly the same time.

== Discovery and excavation ==
The site was first discovered in 1930 by aerial photos taken of the region, but excavations of the site did not take place until 1962. Archaeologist Ian Graham was the first person to start excavations, but it wasn’t until the 1980s and 1990s that real excavation began by UCLA's Institute of Geophysics and Planetary Sciences, and the Institute of Anthropology and History of Guatemala. The combined efforts of these two groups resulted in the RAINPEG Project, which was headed by Dr. Richard D. Hansen. One of the main focuses of the RAINPEG Project was to investigate the limestone quarries in the area of Nakbé.

Nakbe was a key site to the Maya because of its extensive quarry system of limestone, a key element to the building of the many large temples.

The RAINPEC Project spent much of its energy excavating and studying the tools that were used in limestone excavation and preparation. They had unearthed 23 tools including bifacial axes, picks, and hammer stones, all of which were made of chert. The researchers then replicated these tools to see what the methods of mining and shaping the limestone were. Not only did they come to realize that chert was an excellent tool for precision cutting of limestone, but these experiments shed light on how the Maya not only harvested the limestone, but how they shaped it to use for their elaborate complex architectural building.

== Artifacts found at the site ==
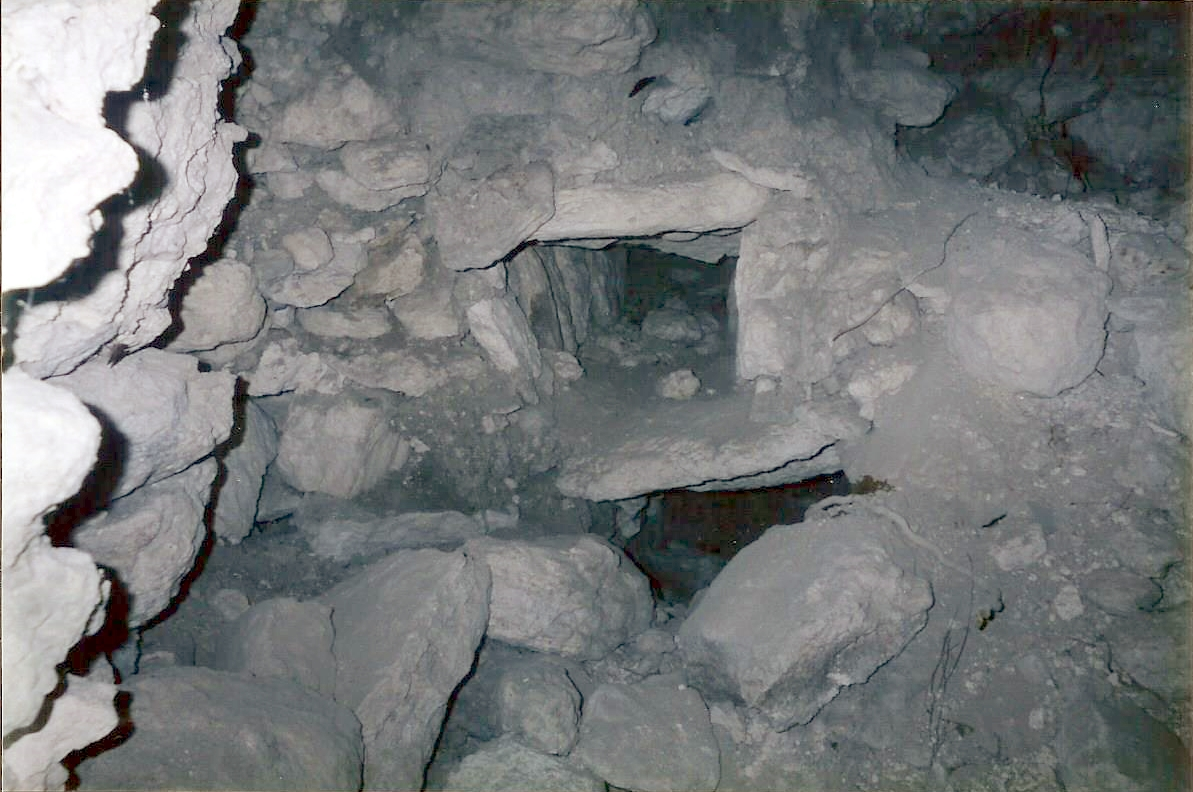
Looted tombs at Nakbe

The site center has yielded large quantities of middle Preclassic ceramics. Pottery found at the site includes red-on-cream items, multi-colored bowls, incised bowls, narrow-necked jars with coarsely painted bands, and a wide variety of monochrome vessels that are red, cream, or black. Many tecomates (jars with narrow openings but without necks) were found. Also found were numerous fragments of figurines depicting a wide variety of human and animal forms. Shells through which holes were ground were a common find at the site. Many were Strombus shells, a type of artifact unique to the first part of the middle Preclassic at Nakbe, Uaxactun, Tikal, and other sites where similarly dated deposits are located.

The shells reflect one of the earliest major imports into the interior of northern Guatemala, and Richard Hansen believes they and similar exotic imports, such as jade and obsidian (a volcanic glass from which sharp tools could be fashioned), played an important role in the formation of an increasingly complex society. The demand for these materials, mainly from Kaminaljuyú, in the Central Highlands of Guatemala, whether for ideological or economic reasons, and the mechanisms of procurement, transportation, and distribution that met that demand, may have required the development of administrative and governmental organizations at an earlier stage in this region than in areas where those commodities were more readily available.

Fairly direct evidence of developing differences in social and economic status includes human incisors with inlaid disks of jadelike stone, found in deposits dating to about 2,800 years ago. Such dental decorations are known to have been associated with elite status in later Maya periods. Archaeologists also found a middle Preclassic ceramic shard with a portion of an incised profile that displays the sloping forehead characteristic of later Maya elite society. This was a frontal cranial deformation that resulted from binding the head in infancy.

== Architecture ==
Nakbe had established monumental architecture as early as the 8th century BC, with some platforms 18 m (59 ft) high. Around 1200 BC, modest villages were leveled and filled to serve as platform foundations for large new buildings, indicating that the platform construction and erection of monumental architecture were planned, simultaneous events. There are many buildings at Nakbe and they are divided into three groups. Two of these groups, called East and West, were constructed during the formative periods and the third group, called Codex, was constructed during the reoccupation of the site in the late classic period. The most impressive and largest of the buildings at Nakbe is a pyramid called Structure 1. Flanked by two large stucco masks and topped with three triadic style roofed structures, Structure 1 is both grand and beautiful. Causeways were also built to connect all these buildings. Maya causeways were paved with crushed white stone, which inspired their Mayan name, sacbe (“white way”) The Kan Causeway at Nakbe was 4 m (13 ft) above adjacent ground level in some places. One causeway was also built that connected Nakbe with El Mirador.

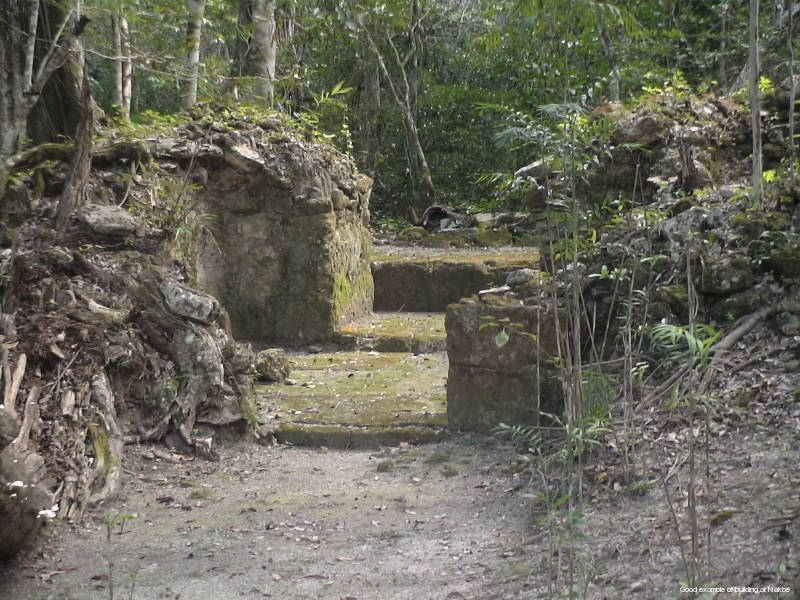
Nakbé, Mid Preclassic (600 BC) Palace remains, The Mirador Basin

== Causeways ==
A causeway system linked important features of the city to one another and later linked Nakbé with other sites. These causeways were often created above the ground level; the Kan Causeway was 4 meters (13 ft) above the ground level in some areas. These causeways were paved with crushed white stone, which created the naming of these causeways from the Maya name sacbe ("white way"). Nakbe was connected to El Mirador by one causeway and later in the Late Classic Maya period Nakbe was connected to the Maya center of Calakmul. Other sites besides Nakbé and El Mirador were connected through this system of sacbeob, which extended for dozens of kilometers.

== Research on quarries at Nakbe ==
The limestone quarries of Nakbe were a significant facet of the research done by The RAINPEG group. Research of the quarries is of considerable importance because understanding of Mayan quarries, a prevalent aspect of the Mayan culture, is lacking. Excavations recovered 23 stone tools that were used to cut the limestone blocks. These tools consisted of bifacial picks and axes, hammerstones, and flake cores that were made of chert. Archaeologists made replicas of these tools to use in experimenting with the cutting and shaping of limestone blocks. By studying the evidence of wear and polish of the tools along with the cut marks on quarry walls, researchers were able to determine how these tools were used and what kind of handles were attached. They made longhandled picks which they used to cut the limestone from the bedrock. Then they used the stone axes to cut and form the block the way they wanted. These experiments showed that chert was a very effective and durable stone to use for the cutting of limestone and other materials. Excavations and research at Nakbe gives us a better understanding of the techniques that the Maya used to construct some of the most extraordinary structures of ancient times and the complications they had to endure along the way.

== Religion and iconography at Nakbe ==
Nakbe Stela 1 consists of forty-five fragments of a once 11 ft (3.4 m). tall monument that had been smashed in antiquity. After pieced together, the stela depicts a scene with two individuals standing face to face and dressed in costumes of a very early Mayan style. One figure is pointing upwards with an index finger to a disembodied head. The scene has been interpreted as a representation from the Popol Vuh. The two figures appear to portray the supernatural twins Hun-Apu and Ixbalanque, with Ixbalanque pointing towards his father’s severed head indicating his connection to a royal lineage. The famous Princeton Vase, illegally excavated, and often interpreted in terms of the Popol Vuh, probably also stems from the Nakbe region.

== Decline of the site ==
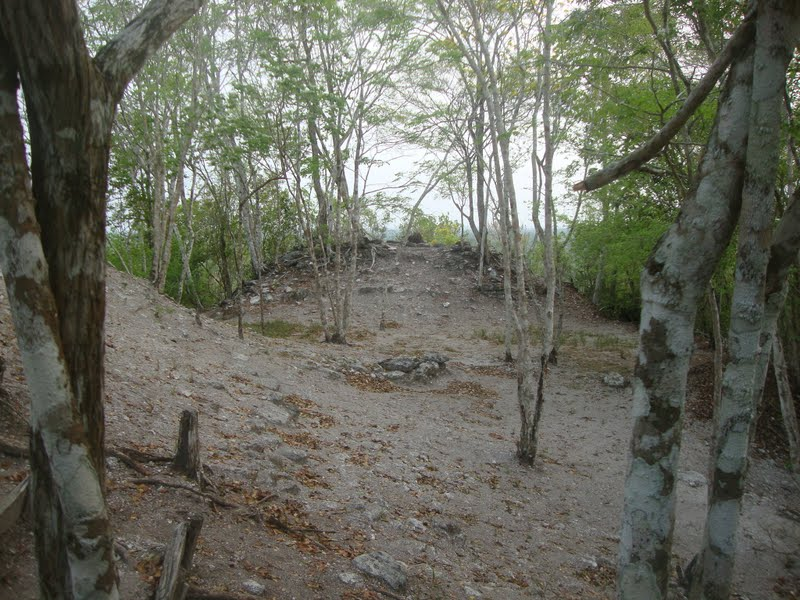
Plaza on top of the triadic pyramid at Nakbé

While at least some remains have been found from nearly every period of Maya society at Nakbe, the site was never a major center after the beginning of the late Preclassic period. The last construction phases of the largest pyramids at Nakbe date to the beginning of this period. Late Preclassic artifacts have proved sparse throughout the site of Nakbe, perhaps because the settlement was rapidly eclipsed by the rise of El Mirador. Nakbe remained virtually abandoned for a thousand years, until some late Classic Maya reoccupied the site. These people established small communities in and around the ruins and left some fine examples of Classic ceramics, including the Princeton Vase, but they built no monuments of their own.
