= Los Olivos =

Los Olivos may refer to:

- Los Olivos District, Peru
- Los Olivos, California, United States
- Los Olivos, Los Santos, Panama
