= Cuatro Balam =

Cuatro Balam is an initiative by the government of Guatemala to dramatically increase tourism in the Maya Biosphere Reserve, focusing on the region's numerous archeological sites. The Reserve is a protected area of 21,602 km^{2} in Guatemala's northernmost Petén Department. The Reserve contains national parks and wildlife preserves, and "multiple use" zones where limited human settlement and activity are permitted.

The Cuatro Balam plan is being promoted as a means of conserving Guatemala's biodiversity and archaeological heritage, while fostering regional economic development. The Guatemalan government says the plan will cover about 22,500 km^{2}, an area slightly larger than the Maya Biosphere Reserve.

The plan is touted as the largest archaeological tourism project in Latin America. Archaeological sites in the Reserve include Tikal, Guatemala’s most famous Maya city, which attracts 120,000 to 180,000 visitors per year, and El Mirador, a lesser-known but larger Maya city dating from the preclassic period. El Mirador is located in the remote, dense jungle about 7 km south of the Mexican border. A government press release lists Tikal, El Mirador, Piedras Negras, and Uaxactún as the Maya sites that will anchor tourism development. Tens of other sites are also being excavated in the region.

B'alam is a word for "jaguar" in many Mayan languages, and cuatro is Spanish for "four"; hence the intended meaning, "four jaguars." "Cuatro Balam" also refers to the four main figures of the K'iche' Maya sacred text Popol Vuh, linked to the four cardinal directions.

The project was officially presented to the press and the public by Guatemala's president Alvaro Colom on July 16, 2008 preceded by months of speculation and discussion. At the presentation, a video was shown depicting aspirations for the first fifteen years of the project, which include attracting 12 million visitors to the region. At El Mirador specifically, Colom says he hopes to increase the annual number of tourists to 40,000. According to President Colom and Eugenio Gabriel, whom Colom has put in charge of the project, the Reserve will be divided into three zones: an archeological park in the north, a tourism hub in the center, and an agricultural zone in the south, intended to prevent further northward migration by Guatemalan farmers and ranchers. Key features of the plan include a small train that will carry tourists to and from archaeological sites at a speed of 16 kilometers per hour and a new university that will promote the study of the region's biodiversity and genetic material, as well as Maya studies. President Colom did not specify exactly how the project will be financed, but said it will require investment from both the public and private sector. At the announcement of the project, Colom said that some of plan objectives could be achieved within just two years, while others would take up to fifteen to realize.

In his announcement of Cuatro Balam, Colom also said that for the project to succeed, the region would have to be protected from invasive farmers and rancher and drug traffickers, who are concentrated in the western part of the Maya Biosphere Reserve.

The plan will be a subject of discussion in the “mesas multisectoriales” or multisectoral roundtables, an ongoing series of talks between government officials, NGOs and community groups to discuss economic development and environmental conservation around El Mirador.
