= La Colorada =

La Colorada may refer to:

- La Colorada, Mexico
- La Colorada, Los Santos, Panama
- La Colorada, Veraguas, Panama
- Carolina Duer, nickname of Argentine world champion boxer
