= Triadic pyramid =

Style in Mayan architecture

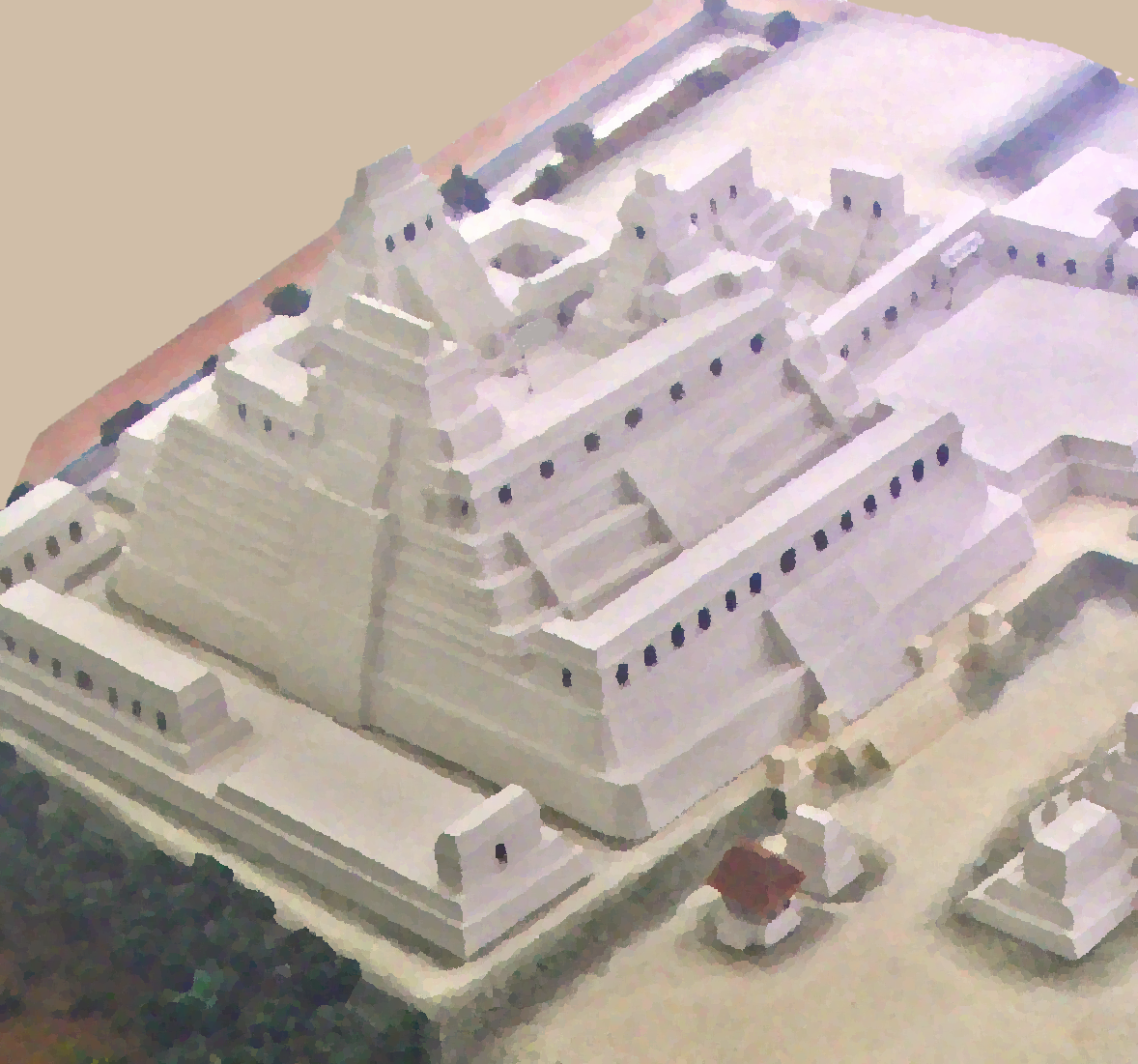
Model of a triadic pyramid at Caracol, Belize

Triadic pyramids were an innovation of the Preclassic Maya civilization consisting of a dominant structure flanked by two smaller inward-facing buildings, all mounted upon a single basal platform. The largest known triadic pyramid was built at El Mirador in the Petén Basin of Guatemala; it covers an area six times as large as that covered by Tikal Temple IV, which is the largest pyramid at that city. The three superstructures all have stairways leading up from the central plaza on top of the basal platform. Triadic pyramid structures are found at early cities in the Maya lowlands.

== Overview ==
Triadic pyramid complexes were most frequently oriented towards the west although other orientations were common, particularly at those cities that possessed more than one triadic pyramid; the second most frequent orientation appears to be north-south.

There are only a few Middle Preclassic examples of the triadic pyramid complex, although their exact chronology might not be secure. No securely established forerunners of Triadic Groups are known, but they may have developed from the eastern range building of E-Group observatory complexes. The triadic form was the predominant architectural form in the Petén region during the Late Preclassic. Examples of triadic pyramids are known from as many as 88 archaeological sites, among them Nakbe, El Mirador, Tikal, Uaxactun, Naranjo, Palenque, and Caracol. At Nakbe, a sizeable city dating to the Middle Preclassic, there are at least a dozen examples of triadic complexes and the four largest structures in the city are triadic in nature. At El Mirador there are probably as many as 36 triadic structures. Examples of the triadic form are even known from Dzibilchaltun in the far north of the Yucatán Peninsula, and Qʼumarkaj in the Highlands of Guatemala. El Tintal has a massive triadic pyramid complex that is the second largest after El Mirador.

The triadic pyramid remained a popular architectural form for centuries after the first examples were built. The triadic form continued in use into the Classic Period, with later examples being found at Uaxactun, Caracol, Seibal, Nakum, Tikal and Palenque. The Qʼumarkaj example is the only one that has been dated to the Postclassic Period.

The triple-temple form of the triadic pyramid appears to be related to Maya mythology. According to one theory, the three hearthstones of the Maya creation myth can be associated with three stars in the constellation of Orion and the triadic pyramid complex may be an architectural representation of this. New studies favor an alternative interpretation, according to which the Triadic Groups may represent the moment of resurrection of the Maya maize god on the top of the Flower Mountain, accompanied by two other deities.

== See also ==
- Mesoamerican pyramids
- Maya architecture
- Sacul, El Petén
