= Mirador Basin =

Hypothesised geological depression in Guatemala

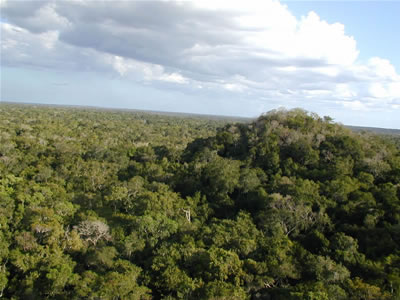
"El Tigre Complex" in the eponymous Mirador Basin site of El Mirador

The Mirador Basin is a hypothesized geological depression found in the remote rainforest of the northern department of Petén, Guatemala. Mirador Basin consists of two true basins, consisting of shallowly sloping terrain dominated by low-lying swamps called bajos; one draining into the San Pedro River and the other into the Candelaria River. The basin is surrounded by rugged karstic limestone hills on the east and south, forming a triangular geographical "trough" covering more than 2,169 km^{2} (837 sq mi). The geological formation of the landscape, as well as the significance of the formation, are the subject of some controversy in Northern Guatemala. NASA Shuttle Radar Topography Mission (SRTM) data indicates no depression in the area.

During the past two decades, the region has been the object of archaeological investigations at the large Middle and Late Preclassic sites of El Mirador, Nakbe, El Tintal, Wakna, the recently discovered sites of Xulnal and El Pesquero, and numerous smaller settlements, dating mostly to the Classic period, such as La Florida, Maaxte, Zacatal, Chan Kan, Tsab Kan, Pedernal, Isla, La Muerta, and La Muralla. Dozens of additional sites are dispersed within the Basin, including several extremely large ones such as Naachtun in the northeast corner which is currently under investigation by a team from the University of Calgary in Canada (Director: Kathryn Reese-Taylor). The primary settlement of the major sites in the basin dates to the Middle Preclassic (ca. 1000 BCE - 350 BCE) and Late Preclassic periods (ca. 350 BCE - CE 150), with relatively little overburden from the large scale constructions and extensive settlements that characterized the Classic periods (CE 250-900) of Lowland Maya civilization.

Illegal logging and forest fires resulting from slash and burn agricultural practices threaten Mirador Basin's rich biodiversity. Looting is also a major threat to the many Mayan archaeological sites that reside in the Basin. While many sites are known, others remain undiscovered and, according to Richard Hansen, "by the time scholars get there, looters may already have plundered them."

The region belongs to the Maya Biosphere Reserve that represents the last large area of intact tropical rainforest remaining in Mesoamerica. Archaeological and environmental studies conducted by the Mirador Basin Project, directed by Richard Hansen, previously known as the Regional Archaeological Investigation of the North Petén, Guatemala (RAINPEG) Project, have identified data relevant to the origins and early development of the Maya civilization in this area. The executing organization for the research is the Foundation for Anthropological Research and Environmental Studies (FARES), and the Institute for Mesoamerican Research at Idaho State University, where Hansen is the Chief Senior Scientist.

Research and development of the Mirador Basin occurs in close cooperation and collaboration with the Guatemalan Institute of Anthropology and History (IDAEH), the Guatemalan Ministry of Culture and Sports (Ministerio de Cultura y Deportes), the Guatemalan Institute of Tourism (INGUAT), the National Council of Protected Areas (CONAP), and the Presidency of the Republic of Guatemala. In addition, projects work closely with community organizations in the department of Petén. The Inter-American Development Bank, along with The National Geographic Society, the Foundation for Maya Cultural and Natural Heritage- Fundación del Patrimonio Cultural y Natural Maya (PACUNAM), the Global Heritage Fund, and the Friends of the Natural and Cultural Heritage of Guatemala (APANAC), the Carlos Novella Foundation, among other private sponsors, have given economic support to projects in the Basin.
