= Tres Quebradas =

Tres Quebradas may refer to:

- Los Patos (also known as Tres Quebradas), a mountain in Argentina
- Tres Quebradas, Los Santos, a corregimiento in Panama
