= La Muerta =

Ruined Mayan buildings in Guatemala

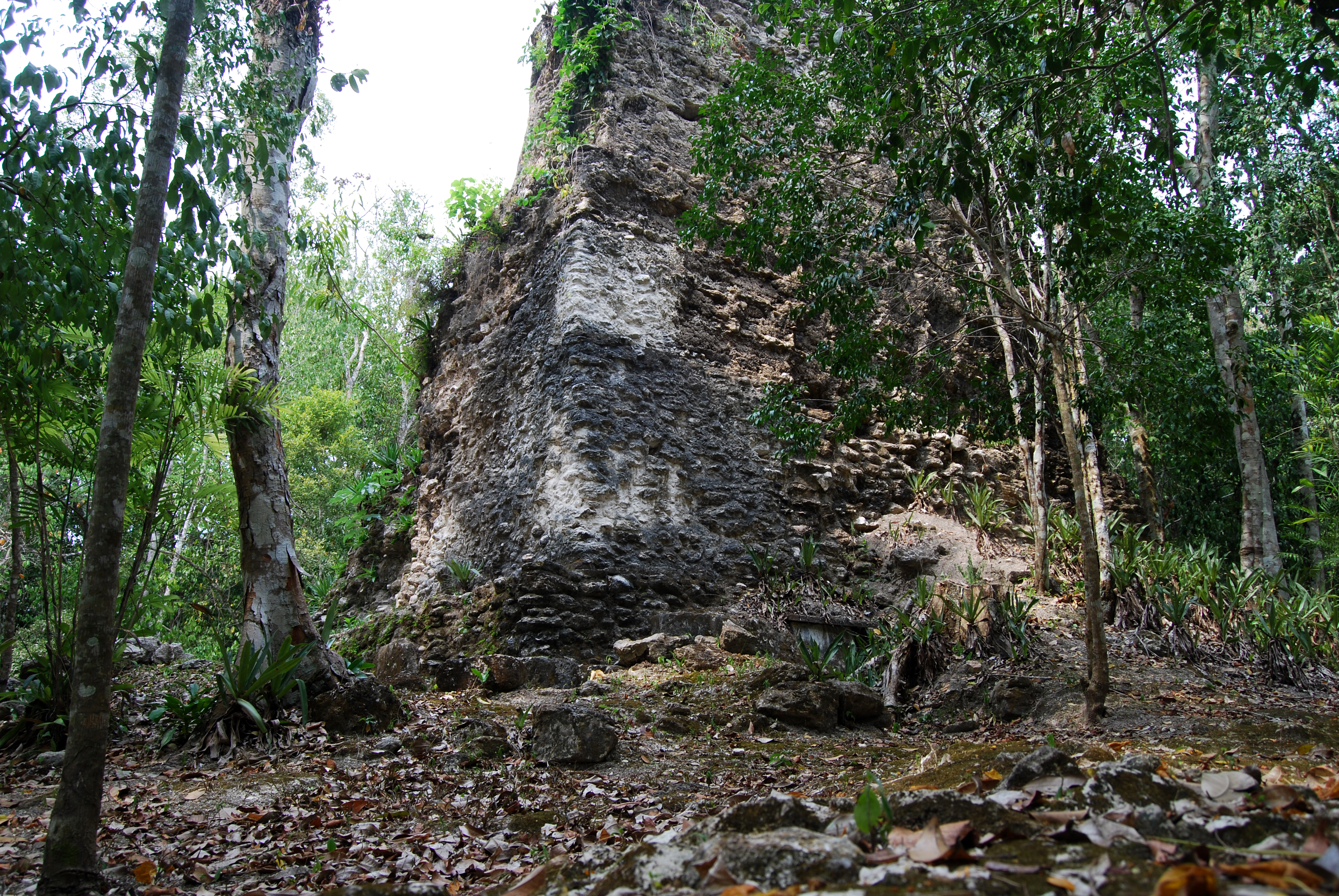
Structure at La Muerta

La Muerta is a Maya archaeological site in the northern Petén region of Guatemala, located between the sites of El Mirador and El Tintal. It is located on a promontory 3.5 kilometres (2.2 mi) south of the El Tigre complex of El Mirador, and it is considered a satellite of that city. La Muerta was inhabited during the Early to Late Classic Period. The site has been extensively looted.

Although the precise origin of the name is unknown, the site takes its name from when it was used as a gum-gatherers' camp, the name meaning "the dead (woman or thing)" in Spanish.

La Muerta was investigated by archaeologist Richard D. Hansen in the 1980s. Some of the roof combs of the structures remain in good condition. The site is divided into North and South Groups, located approximately 400 metres (1,300 ft) apart. Eleven residential areas have been identified within these two groups.

== Structures ==
Structure A1 is a temple with a north-facing stairway. The building measures 11.5 metres (38 ft) by 8.6 metres (28 ft) and is 9.4 metres (31 ft) high, with walls built of limestone. The structure has been severely damaged by looters. During archaeological investigations of the building, a damaged but finely crafted stucco face was excavated.

Structure A2 is a pyramid immediately to the west of Structure A1 and has been badly damaged by a combination of natural erosion and looting. Archaeologists have completely excavated the interior of the structure. The structure has six vaulted rooms of different sizes with fine stucco floors. The walls had been partially faced with stucco which showed traces of red paint. The building had stairways on the north and south sides, these were flanked by poorly preserved sculpted masks that had traces of red and blue paint. Investigations of Structure A2 have revealed abundant ceramics dating to both the Early and Late Classic.

Structure 2 at La Muerta is one of the most unusual Maya buildings in the northern Petén region, with a two-level subterranean labyrinth.

== Monuments ==
Monument 1 is a sculptured stela that was found in the North Group. It was in a very poor state of preservation, being badly eroded and broken into more than 900 fragments of various sizes. It is likely that the monument was deliberately destroyed in antiquity. The stela bears the image of a head in profile, wearing a mask. The face is above the representation of a large monster head with upper teeth. A column of at least six hieroglyphs is also present. The main figure is thought to be that of a deity.

Stela 2 is an isolated monument located about 100 metres (330 ft) north of the path leading to El Mirador. It is a limestone stela measuring 2.9 metres (9.5 ft) tall, and is divided into upper and lower portions by a worn depression. The stela has several carved circular cavities measuring roughly 6 centimetres (2.4 in) across and 3 centimetres (1.2 in) deep but is otherwise plain, it may originally have been covered in painted stucco.
