= Petén Department =

Department of Guatemala

Petén Department Departamento de Petén
- Department of Guatemala
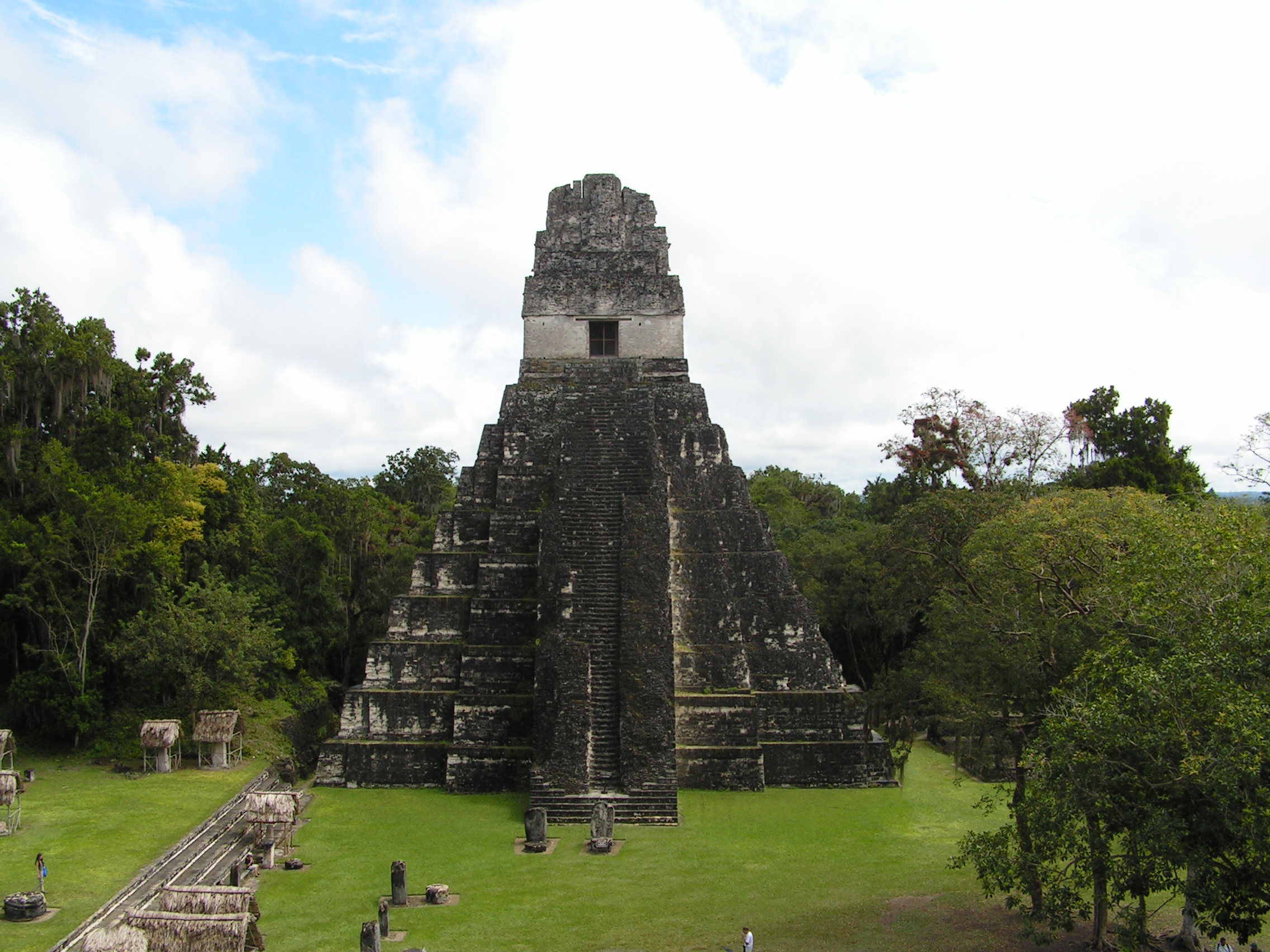
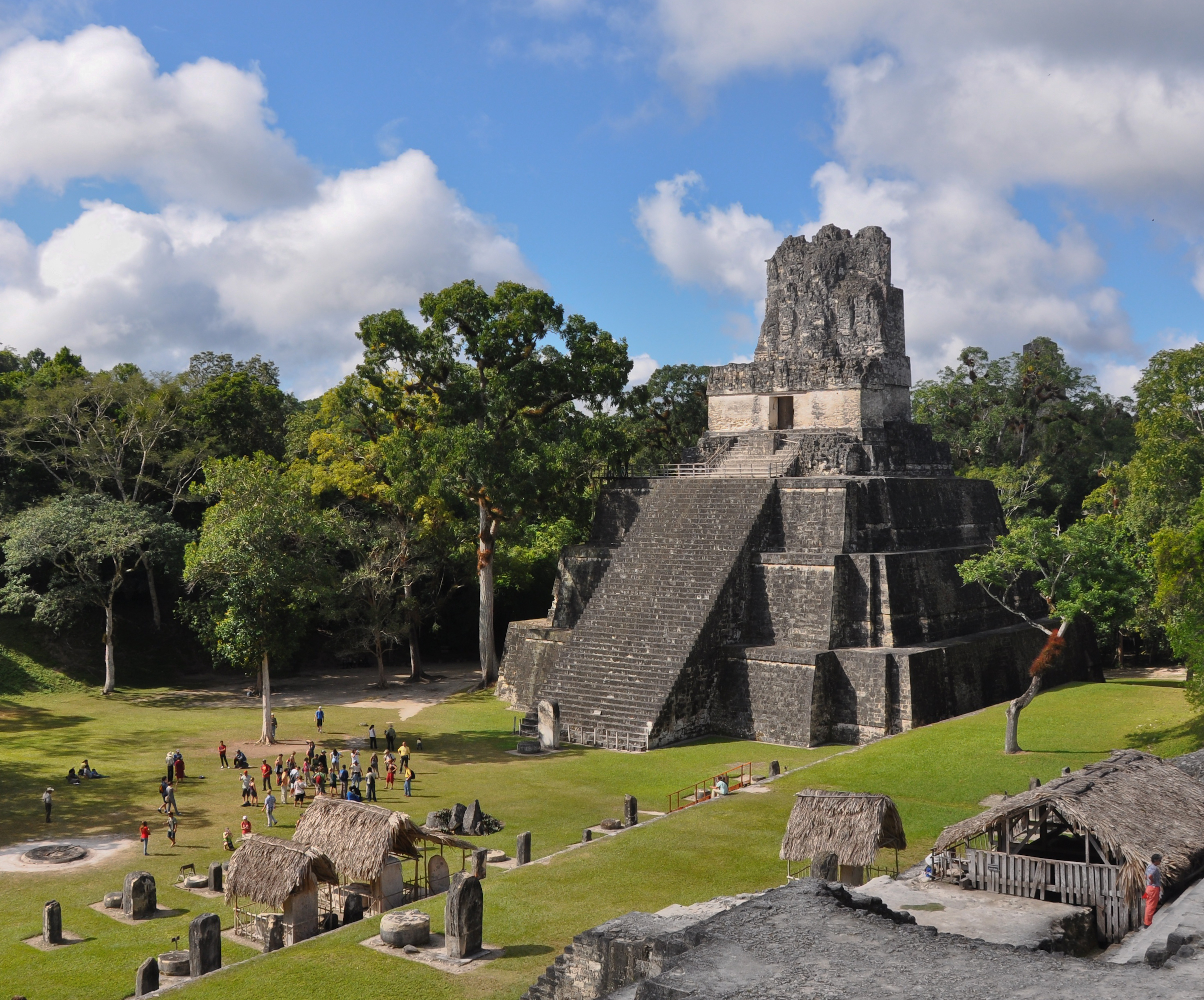
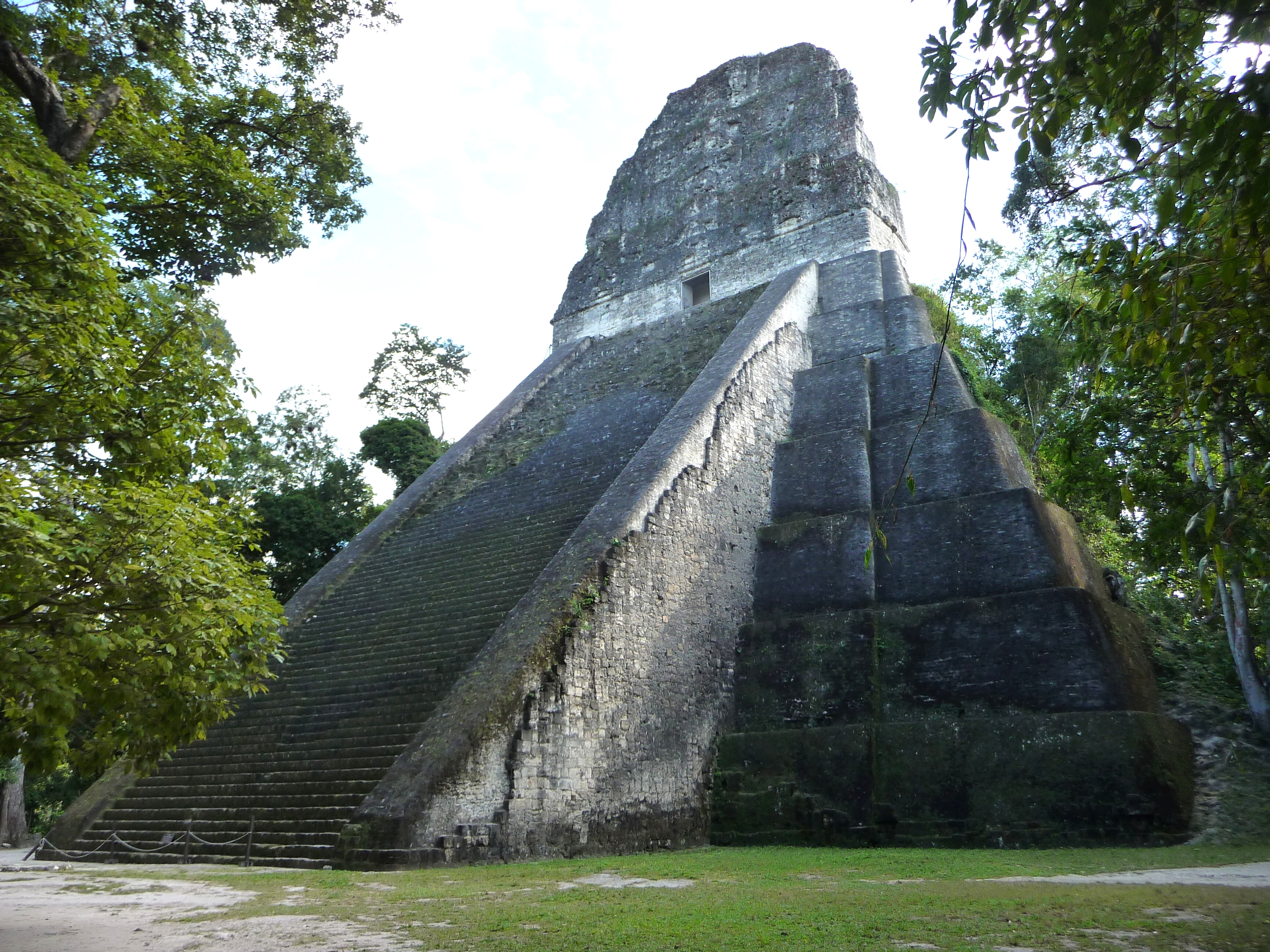
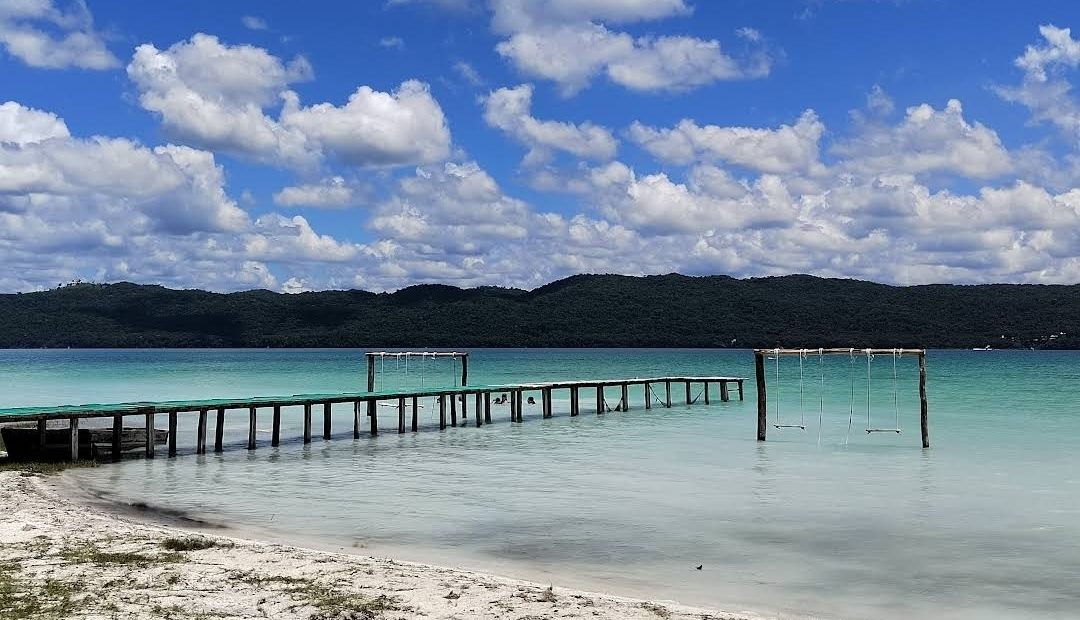
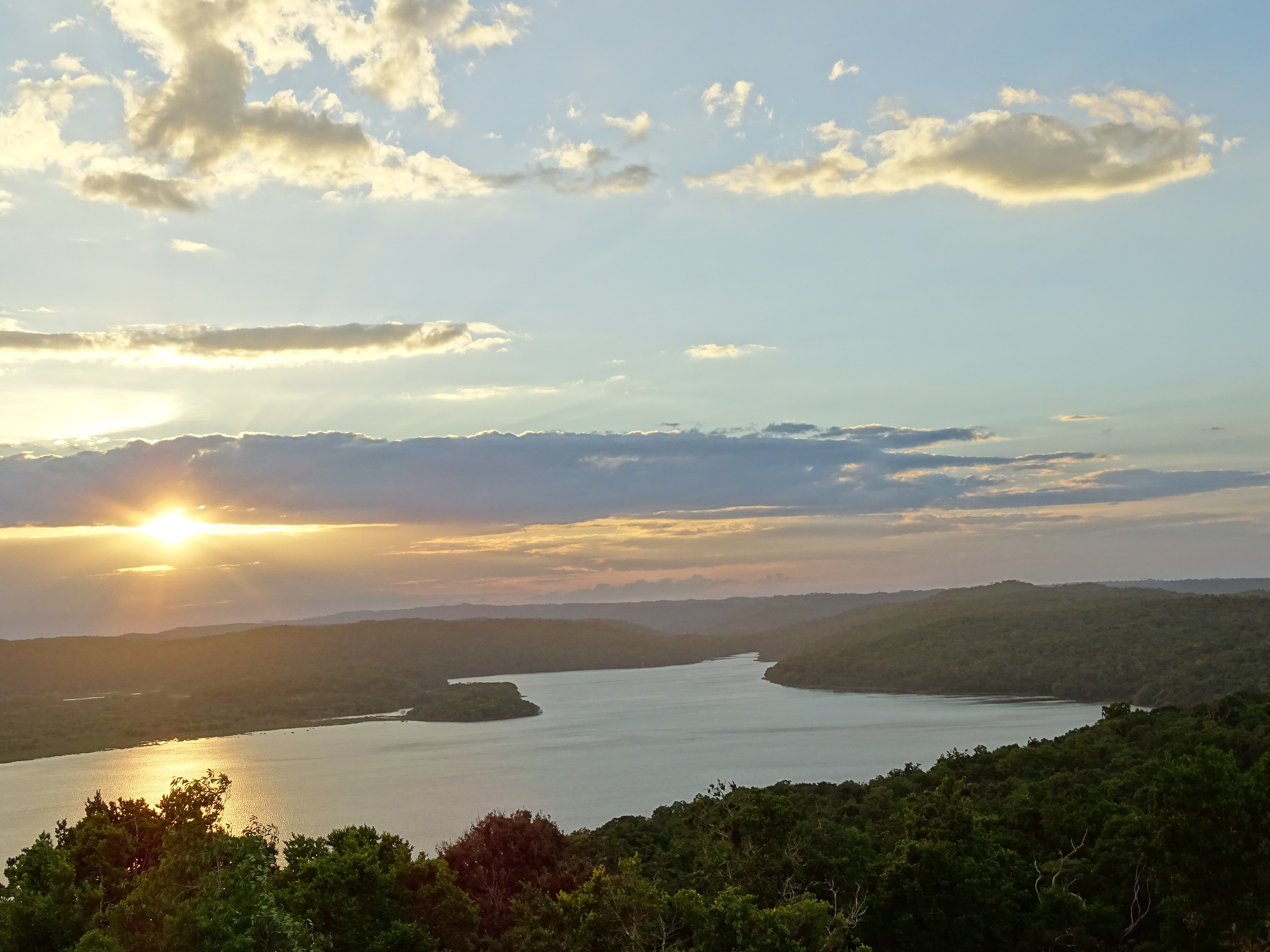
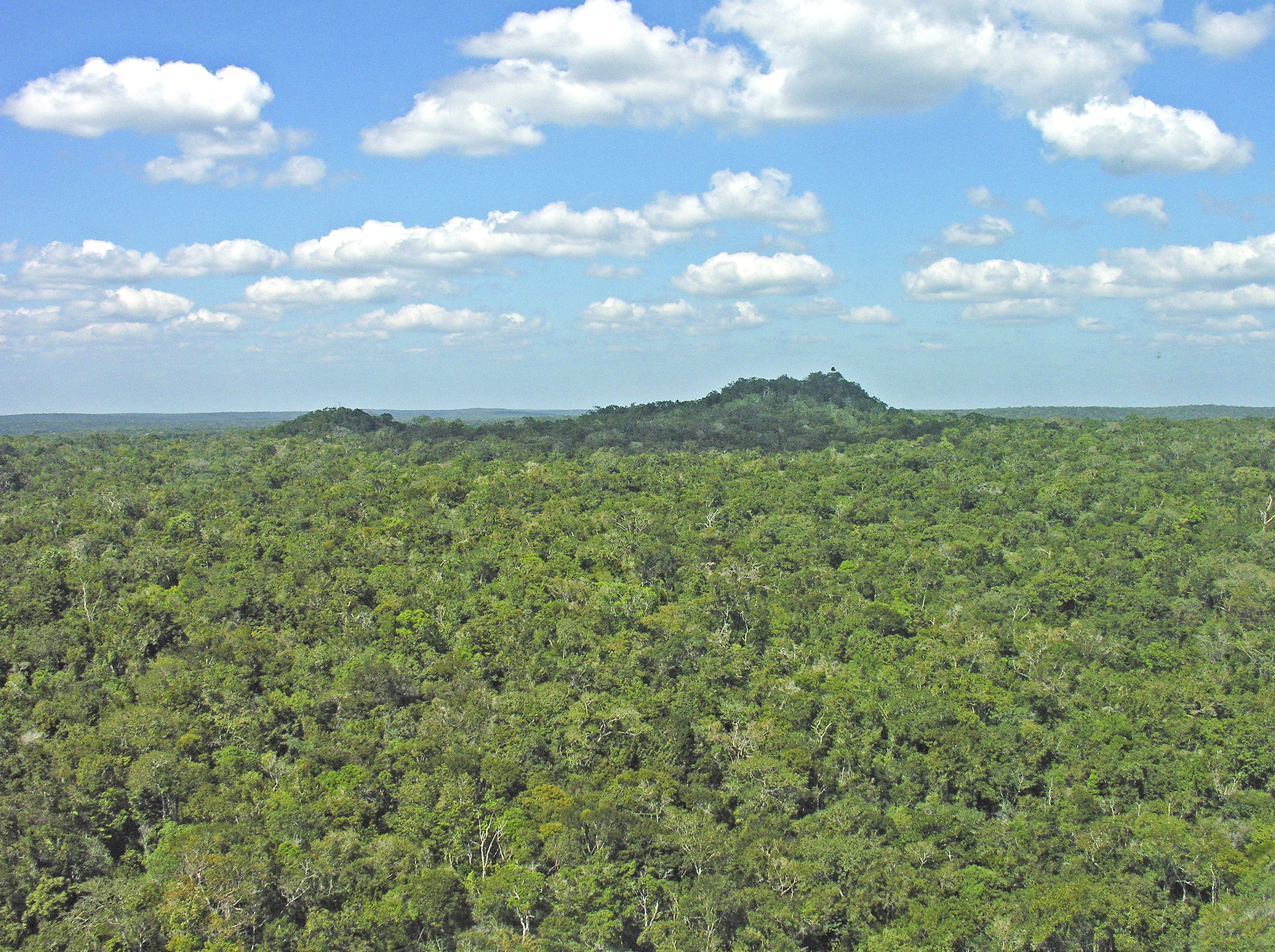
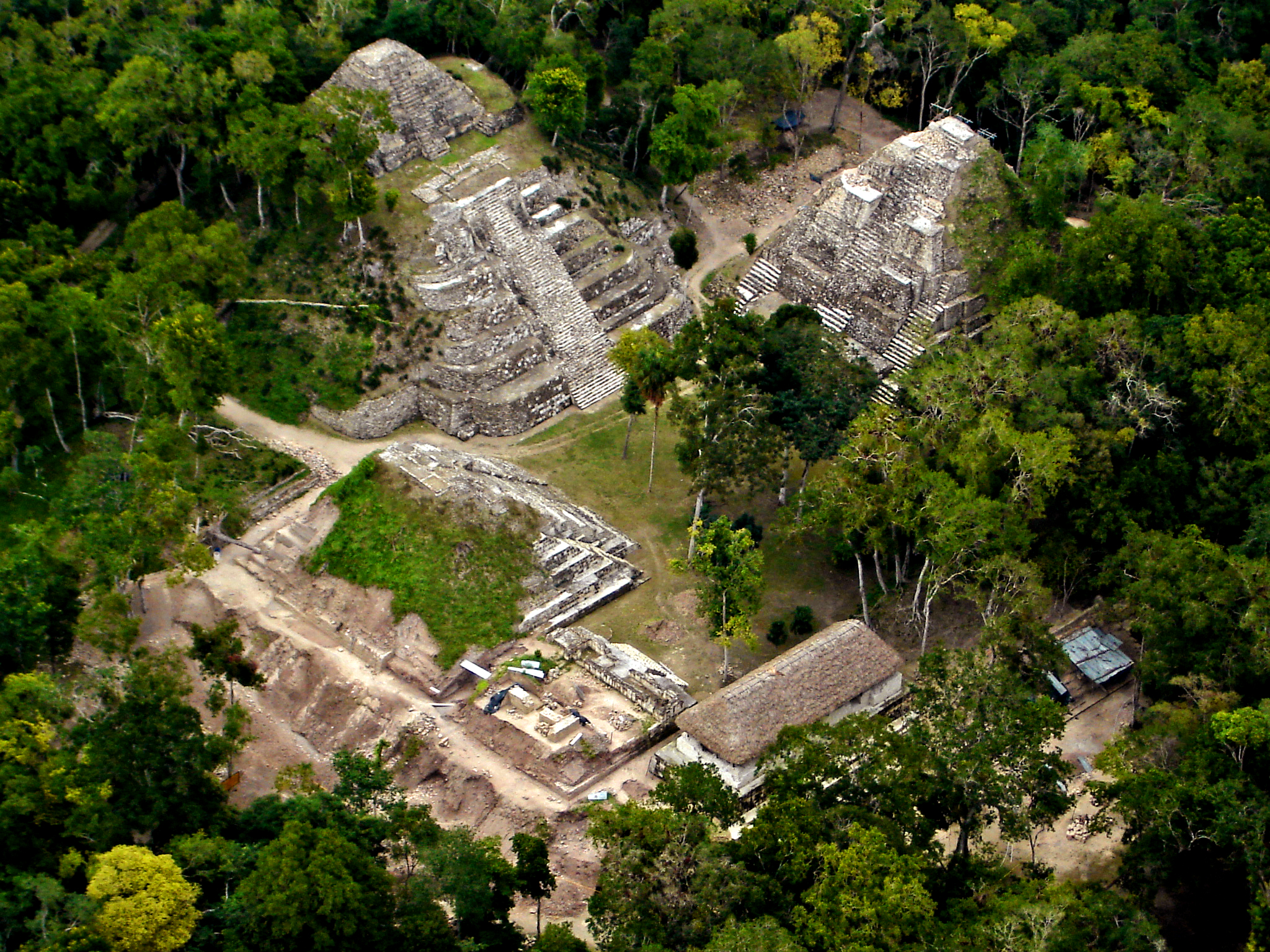
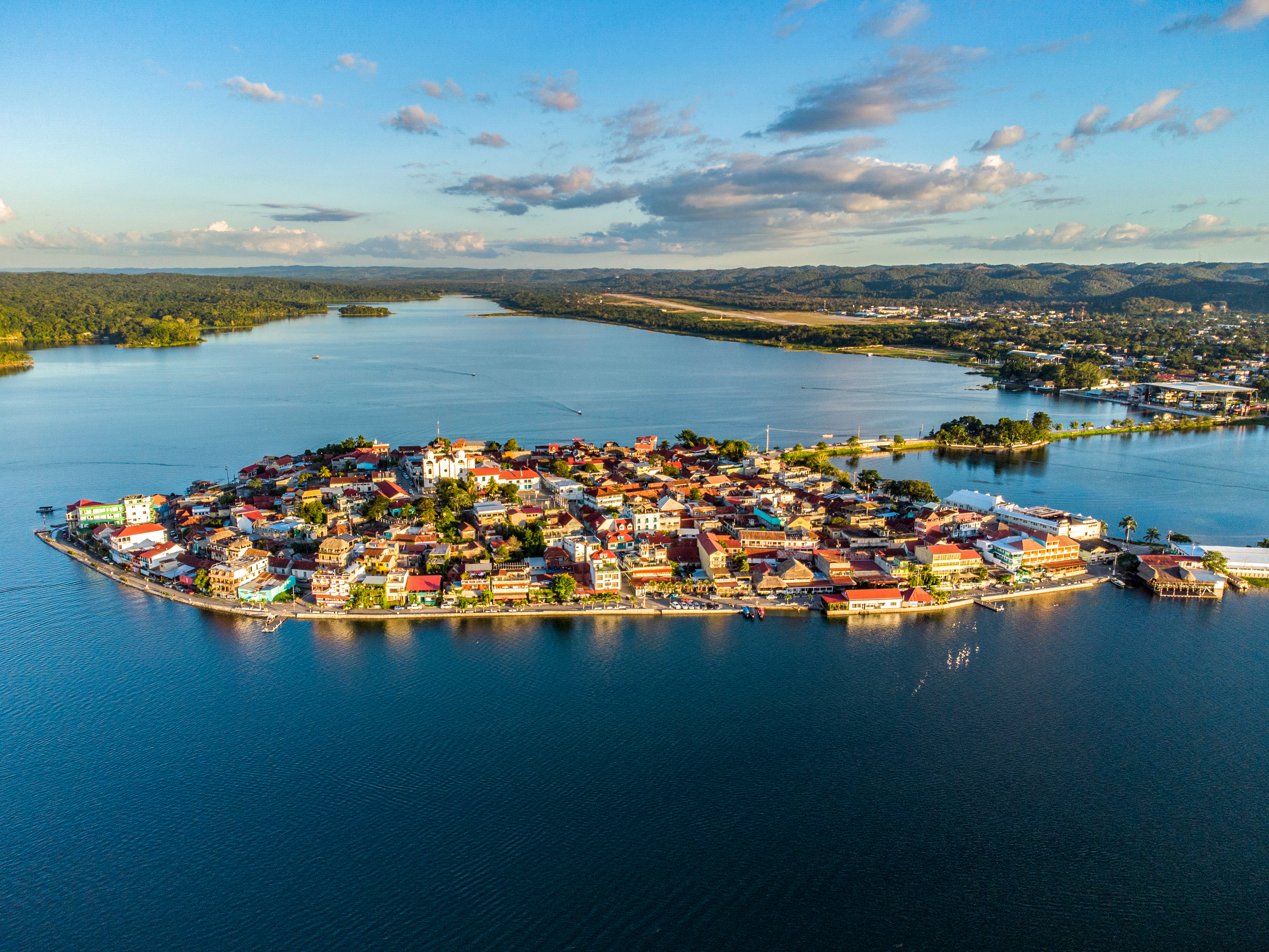
- Tikal Temple I Tikal Temple II Tikal Temple V Three Nations Beach Yaxhá Lake Maya Biosphere Yaxha Flores Island

- Flag Coat of arms

- Coordinates: 16°54′N 89°54′W
- Country: Guatemala
- Capital: Flores
- Largest settlement: Sayaxché
- Municipalities: 14

Government
  - Type: Departmental

Area
  - Department of Guatemala: 35,854 km^{2} (13,843 sq mi)

Population (mid 2018)
  - Department of Guatemala: 595,548
  - Density: 16.610/km^{2} (43.021/sq mi)
  - Urban: 110,399
  - Ethnicities: Ladino; Mopan; Lacandon; Itza; Q'eqchi'
  - Religions: Roman Catholicism; Evangelicalism
- Time zone: UTC-6
- ISO 3166 code: GT-PE
- Languages: Spanish

Petén (from the Itz'a, Noj Petén, 'Great Island') is a department of Guatemala. It is geographically the northernmost department of Guatemala, as well as the largest by area – at 35,854 km^{2} (13,843 sq mi) it accounts for about one third of Guatemala's area. The capital is Flores. The population at the mid-2018 official estimate was 595,548.

== Toponymy ==
The name Petén comes from Itza Noj Peten ("great island"), which refers to Flores Island, the island in the south of Lake Petén Itzá where the capital of the department is located.

== Geography ==
The Petén department is bordered on the east by Belize and by Mexico (with the Mexican states of Chiapas to the west, Tabasco to the northwest and Campeche to the north). Its northwest border includes the border town of El Ceibo, Guatemala, adjacent to El Ceibo, Tabasco, Mexico. To the south it borders the Guatemalan departments of Alta Verapaz and Izabal. Much of the western border with Mexico is formed by the Usumacinta River and its tributary the Salinas River. Portions of the southern border of the department are formed by the rivers Gracias a Dios and Santa Isabel.

The Petén lowlands are formed by a densely forested low-lying limestone plain featuring karstic topography. The area is crossed by low east–west oriented ridges of Cenozoic limestone and is characterised by a variety of forest and soil types; water sources include generally small rivers and low-lying seasonal swamps known as bajos. A chain of fourteen lakes runs across the central drainage basin of the Petén; during the rainy season some of these lakes become interconnected. This drainage area measures approximately 100 kilometres (62 mi) east-west by 30 kilometres (19 mi) north-south. The largest lake is Lake Petén Itza, near the centre of the drainage basin; it measures 32 by 5 km (20 by 3 mi). A broad savannah extends south of the central lakes; it features a compact red clay soil that is too poor to support heavy cultivation. This resulted in a relatively low level of pre-Columbian occupation. The savannah has an average altitude of 150 metres (490 ft) above mean sea level with karstic ridges reaching an average altitude of 300 metres (980 ft). The savannah is surrounded by hills with unusually steep southern slopes and gentler northern approaches; the hills are covered with dense tropical forest. To the north of the lakes region bajos become more frequent, interspersed with forest. In the far north of the Petén the Mirador Basin forms another interior drainage region. To the south Petén reaches an altitude of approximately 500 metres (1,600 ft) as it rises towards the Guatemalan Highlands and meets Paleozoic metamorphic rocks.

The main bodies of standing water in the department are the lakes Petén Itzá, Peténchel, Quexil, Salpetén and Macanche in the centre of the department; Yaxhá and Sacnab in the east, Petexbatún in the southwest, and Perdida, Larga, La Gloria, San Diego, Mendoza, El Repasto and Lacandón in the west. The San Pedro River flows east to west in the northwest corner of Petén.

== Climate ==
The climate of Petén is divided into wet and dry seasons, although these seasons are not clearly defined in the south; the climate varies from tropical in the south to semitropical in the north. Temperature varies between 12 and 40 °C (54 and 104 °F), although it does not usually drop beneath 18 °C (64 °F). Mean temperature varies from 24.3 °C (75.7 °F) in the southeast around Poptún to 26.9 °C (80.4 °F) around Uaxactún in the northeast. Highest temperatures are reached from April to June; January is the coldest month. All Petén experiences a hot dry period in late August. Annual precipitation is high, varying from a mean of 1,198 mm (47.2 in) in the northeast to 2,007 mm (79.0 in) in central Petén around Flores. The extreme southeast of Petén experiences the largest variations in temperature and rainfall, with precipitation reaching as much as 3,000 mm (120 in) in a year.

== History ==
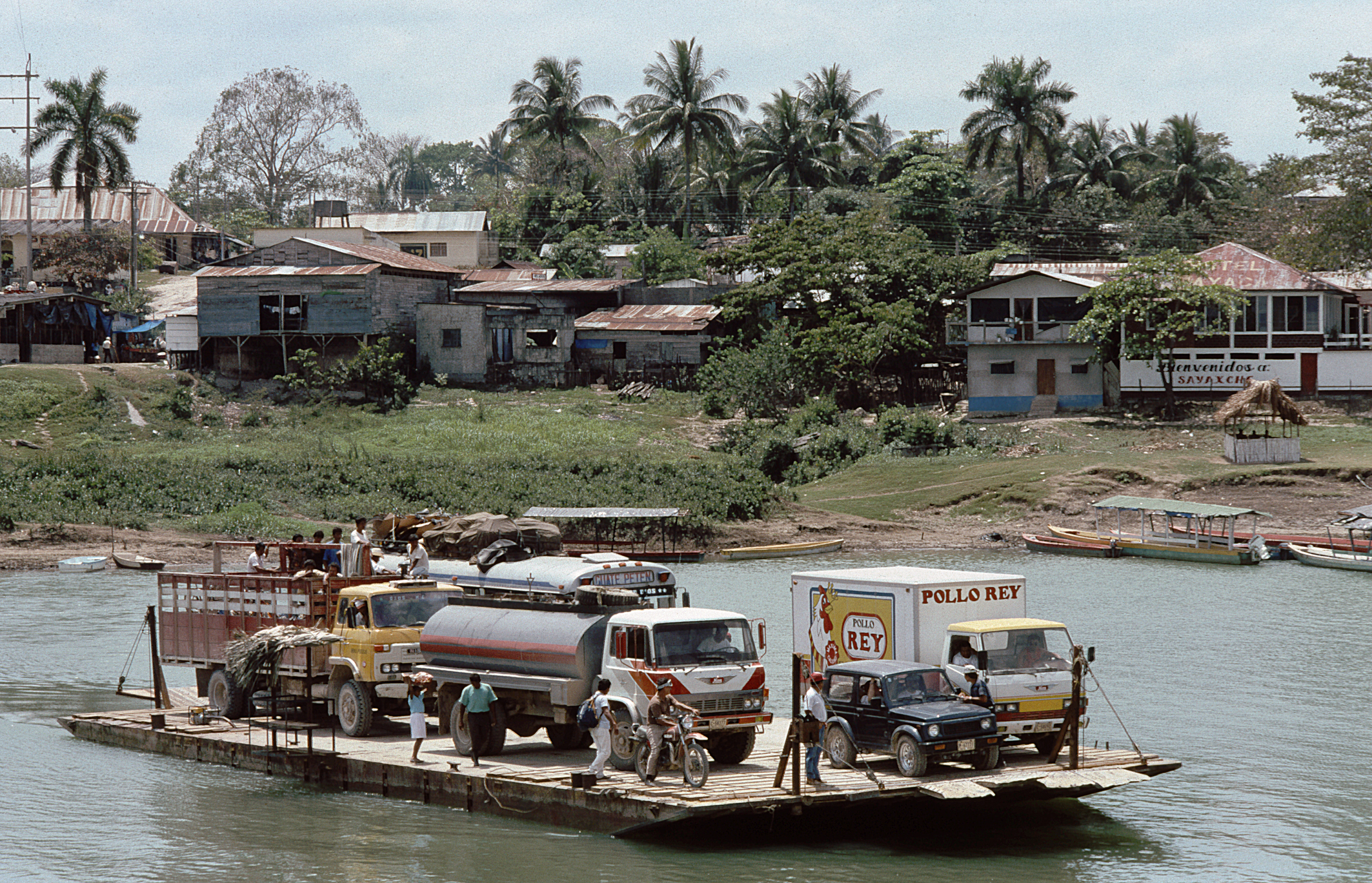
Ferry crossing the Pasión River at Sayaxché.

The Petén department was created by decree of the Guatemalan government on 8 May 1866.

Starting in the 1960s the Guatemalan government offered land in Petén to any citizen willing to settle on it and pay a fee of $25. A road was opened up to Flores, although it was unpaved, and the notorious bus trip to Flores was known to take up to 24 hours to travel the 500 kilometres (300 mi). Small airports were built at Flores and Tikal, bringing tourists to the region. In the early 1970s a road was opened from Tikal to Belize. The first paved road in Petén was built in 1982.

Since the 1990s many new settlers have come to Petén. The area is also experiencing severe deforestation in its southern half. Deforestation has been particularly rapid near Laguna del Tigre National Park in western Petén. To combat deforestation, Guatemalan president Álvaro Colom proposed dramatically expanding ecotourism around Maya archaeological sites, especially El Mirador, and trying to further develop an agricultural system in the southern portion of the Maya Biosphere Reserve that would prevent further northward migration. He called his plan "Cuatro Balam".

The Mundo Maya International Airport, in Santa Elena, is the second largest in Guatemala.

== Municipalities ==
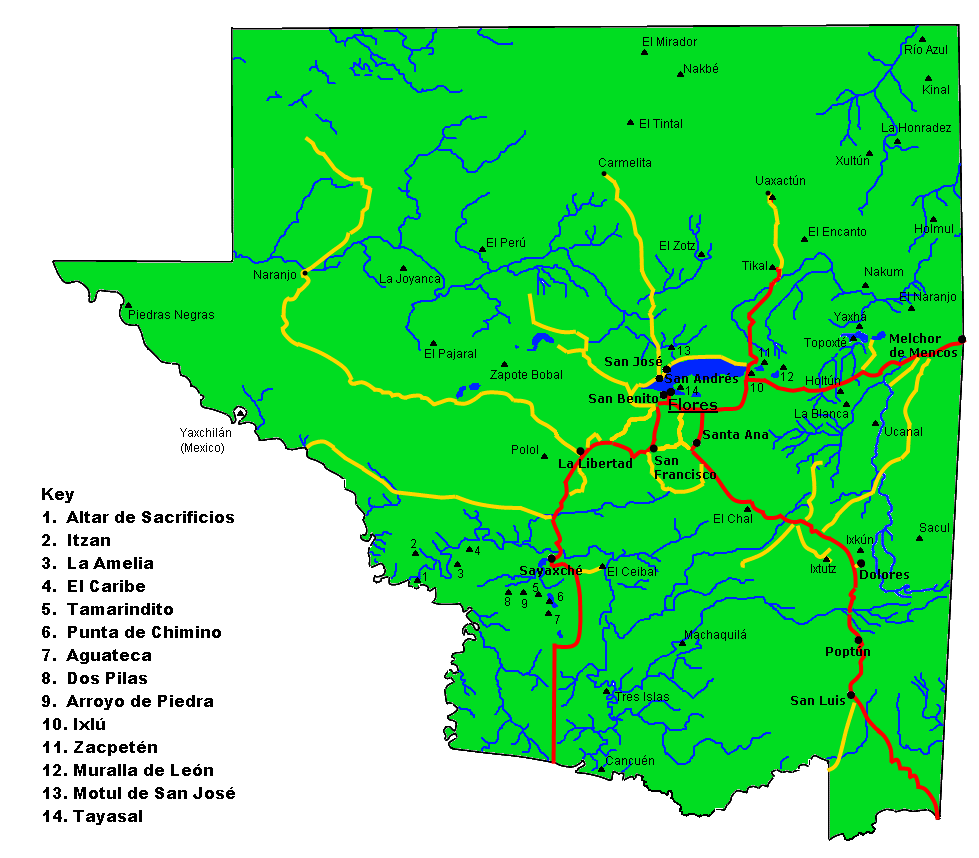
Map of Petén showing its principal settlements, roads, watercourses and archaeological sites. Click to enlarge.

Petén consists of the following 14 municipalities, listed below with their populations in 2002 and 2018. Las Cruces was separated from La Libertad in 2011, and El Chal was separated from Dolores in 2014.

Name	Area (km^{2})	Population Census 2002	Population Estimate 2018
Dolores	1,374	32,404	29,406
El Chal	947	– (Note: The 2002 population of El Chal municipality was included in the figure for Dolores municipality.)	15,095
Flores	2,934	30,897	41,166
La Libertad	4,986	67,252	80,597
Las Cruces	1,834	– (Note: The 2002 population of Las Cruces municipality was included in the figure for La Libertad municipality.)	36,652
Melchor de Mencos	4,208	18,872	29,339
Poptún	1,480	35,663	63,854
San Andrés	8,513	20,295	34,160
San Benito	129	29,926	50,701
San Francisco	581	8,917	15,889
San José	1,792	3,584	7,034
San Luis	2,541	48,745	74,813
Santa Ana	1,191	14,602	22,630
Sayaxché	3,550	55,578	94,212
Total Petén	35,854	366,735	595,548

== Museums ==
- Museo Regional del Sureste de Petén in Dolores.
- Museo Regional del Mundo Maya, in San Miguel (Flores).

== Archaeological sites ==
The Petén department includes a large number of archaeological sites belonging to the ancient Maya civilization, many of which have only received minimal attention by archaeologists.

The sites with some level of restoration include Tikal, Uaxactún, Aguateca, Seibal, Yaxha, Nakum, Topoxte, San Clemente and La Blanca.

Other archaeological sites include: Altar de Sacrificios, La Amelia, Arroyo de Piedra, Bejucal, Cancuén, El Caribe, El Chal, Cival, La Corona, Dos Pilas, Holmul, Holtun, Itzan, Ixkun, Ixlu, Ixtonton, Ixtutz, La Joyanca, Kinal, Machaquila, El Mirador, Motul de San José, La Muerta, Muralla de León, Naachtun, Nakbe, Naranjo, El Peru, Piedras Negras, Polol, El Porvenir, Punta de Chimino, Río Azul, Sacul, San Bartolo, La Sufricaya, Tamarindito, Tayasal, El Tintal, Tres Islas, Ucanal, Xultun, Zacpeten, Zapote Bobal and El Zotz.
