= Los Olivos, Los Santos =

Coordinates: 7.9167°N 80.4833°W

Los Olivos
- Corregimiento
- Location within Panama
- Country: Panama
- Province: Los Santos
- District: Los Santos

Area
  - Land: 27 km^{2} (10 sq mi)

Population (2010)
  - Total: 1,259
  - Density: 46.6/km^{2} (121/sq mi)
- Population density calculated based on land area.
- Time zone: UTC−5 (EST)

Los Olivos is a corregimiento in Los Santos District, Los Santos Province, Panama with a population of 1,259 as of 2010. Its population as of 1990 was 988; its population as of 2000 was 1,149.
