= Las Cruces, Guatemala =

Las Cruces
- Municipality

- Location in Guatemala
- Coordinates: 16°38′10″N 90°11′02″W
- Country: Guatemala
- Department: El Petén
- Municipality: Las Cruces

Government
  - Type: Municipal
- Elevation: 130 m (430 ft)

Population (2022)
  - Total: 39,188
  - Ethnicities: Ladino K'iche'
  - Religions: Roman Catholicism Evangelicalism Maya
- Climate: Am

Las Cruces (Spanish pronunciation: [las kɾuˈses]) is a municipality in the northern Guatemalan department of El Petén. The municipality was founded in 2011 when it split off from the territory of La Libertad.
