= Las Cruces, Los Santos =

Coordinates: 7.8333°N 80.4333°W

Las Cruces
- Corregimiento
- Location within Panama
- Country: Panama
- Province: Los Santos
- District: Los Santos

Area
  - Land: 44.5 km^{2} (17.2 sq mi)

Population (2010)
  - Total: 1,201
  - Density: 27/km^{2} (70/sq mi)
- Population density calculated based on land area.
- Time zone: UTC−5 (EST)

Las Cruces is a corregimiento in Los Santos District, Los Santos Province, Panama with a population of 1,201 as of 2010. Its population as of 1990 was 1,118; its population as of 2000 was 1,198.
