= La Colorada, Los Santos =

Coordinates: 7.8167°N 80.5500°W

La Colorada
- Corregimiento
- Location within Panama
- Country: Panama
- Province: Los Santos
- District: Los Santos

Area
  - Land: 20.7 km^{2} (8.0 sq mi)

Population (2010)
  - Total: 1,030
  - Density: 49.8/km^{2} (129/sq mi)
- Population density calculated based on land area.
- Time zone: UTC−5 (EST)

La Colorada is a corregimiento in Los Santos District, Los Santos Province, Panama with a population of 1,030 as of 2010. Its population as of 1990 was 987; its population as of 2000 was 1,010.
