= Ian Graham =

British Mesoamericanist (1923–2017)

OBE Ian Graham
- Born: Ian James Alastair Graham; November 12, 1923
- Died: August 1, 2017 (aged 93)

Academic background
- Education: Trinity College, Oxford; Trinity College Dublin

Ian James Alastair Graham OBE (12 November 1923 – 1 August 2017) was a British Mayanist whose explorations of Maya ruins in the jungles of Mexico, Guatemala, and Belize helped establish the Corpus of Maya Hieroglyphic Inscriptions published by the Peabody Museum of Harvard University. Among his related works is a biography of an early predecessor, the 19th-century British Maya explorer Alfred Maudslay.

== Early life and studies ==
Ian Graham was born 1923 in Campsea Ashe, a village in the East Anglia county of Suffolk, England. His father was Lord Alastair Graham, the youngest son of Douglas Graham, 5th Duke of Montrose. His family also includes relatives in publishing, specifically associated with the Morning Post.

== Education ==
Graham went to Trinity College, Cambridge in 1942 as an undergraduate in physics, but his studies were put on hold the following year when he left to enlist in the Royal Navy in which he served for the remainder of World War II, largely working in radar research and development. After the war his studies were resumed at Trinity College, Dublin from where he completed his bachelor's degree in 1951.

== Early career ==
Graham’s first research position was a three-year project funded by the Nuffield Foundation and working in the small Scientific Department of The National Gallery in London. The objective of this was to study the penetration and swelling of paint films and varnishes by solvents. Following the successful completion of the project, in 1954 he felt he needed work with a broader scope. During the three years he had enjoyed a vivid social life and the many connections this led to allowed him to take up photography semi-professionally and embark on extensive travels. These activities gave rise eventually to two books illustrated with his photographs. A visit to Mexico in 1958 initiated his long involvement with Maya archaeology.

== Field work ==
Graham's field work was responsible for recording and cataloguing the single largest collection of Maya sculpture, carving and monumental artwork. His photography and drawings at such sites as Coba, Naranjo, Piedras Negras, Seibal, Tonina, Uaxactun, and Yaxchilan, created an original, highly detailed record of these (and other) sites; documentation that is still utilized as legal evidence, preventing the sale of looted and illegally and illicitly obtained art and artifacts. Graham was, for many years, involved as a consultant and witness in criminal cases of looted art, including important cases of artifact repatriation.

== Professional achievements and honors ==
In 1968 Graham founded the Corpus of Maya Hieroglyphics Program at Harvard University’s Peabody Museum, joining the museum fully in 1970. In 1981, he became a MacArthur Fellow for his work preserving and cataloguing Maya relics. He received the Society for American Archaeology’s Lifetime Achievement Award in 2004. He was appointed OBE in the 1999 Birthday Honours.

Graham published a memoir of his professional life and career, The Road to Ruins, in 2010.

== Selected bibliography ==
- Wheeler, Sir Mortimer and Graham, Ian, Splendours of the East, Weidenfeld and Nicolson, London 1965.
- Graham, Ian. Archaeological Explorations in El Peten, Guatemala. Middle American Research Institute, Tulane University, 1967.
- Nicolson, Nigel and Graham, Ian, Great Houses, Weidenfeld and Nicolson, London 1968. Also as Great Houses of the Western World, G.P. Putnam’s Sons, New York 1968.
- Graham, Ian. "The Ruins of La Florida, Peten, Guatemala." Monographs and Papers in Maya Archaeology 1 (1970): 427-455.
- Graham, Ian. The Art of Maya Hieroglyphic Writing, 1971.
- Graham, Ian, Patricia Galloway, and Irwin Scollar. "Model studies in computer seriation." Journal of Archaeological Science 3.1 (1976): 1-30.
- Graham, Ian. "Spectral analysis and distance methods in the study of archaeological distributions." Journal of Archaeological Science 7.2 (1980): 105-129.
- Graham, Ian. Yaxchilan. Peabody Museum of Archaeology and Ethnology, 1982.
- Graham, Ian, and Peter Mathews. Corpus of Maya hieroglyphic inscriptions. Vol. 6. Peabody Museum of Archaeology and Ethnology, Harvard University Publications Department, 1983.
- Von Euw, Eric, and Ian Graham. Corpus of Maya Hieroglyphic Inscriptions: Xultun, La Honradez, Uaxactun. Peabody Museum of Archaeology and Ethnology, Harvard University, 1986.
- Kamal, Omar S., et al. "Multispectral image processing for detail reconstruction and enhancement of Maya murals from La Pasadita, Guatemala." Journal of Archaeological Science 26.11 (1999): 1391-1407.
- Graham, Ian, Alfred Maudslay and the Maya: A Biography. Norman: University of Oklahoma Press 2003.
- Stuart, David, and Ian Graham. Corpus of Maya Hieroglyphic Inscriptions. Peabody Museum of Archaeology and Ethnology, Harvard University, 2003.
- Carter, Elizabeth A., et al. "Raman spectroscopy applied to understanding Prehistoric Obsidian Trade in the Pacific Region." Vibrational Spectroscopy 50.1 (2009): 116-124.
- Graham, Ian, The Road to Ruins. University of New Mexico Press 2010.
