= Richard D. Hansen =

American archaeologist

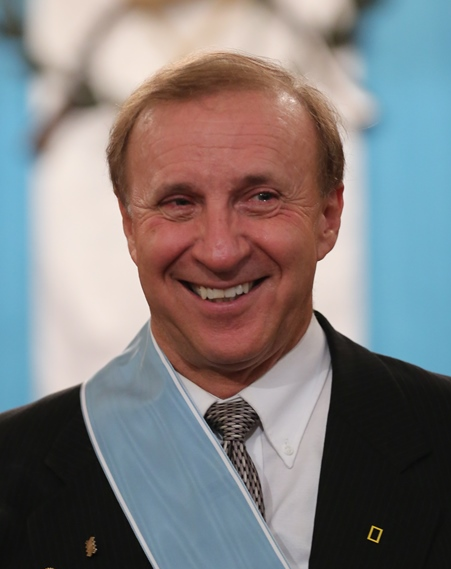
Hansen in 2017

Richard D. Hansen is an American archaeologist who is an adjunct professor of anthropology at the University of Utah.

== Career ==
Hansen is a specialist on the ancient Maya civilization and directs the Mirador Basin Project, which investigates a circumscribed geological and cultural area known as the Mirador Basin in the northern Petén, Guatemala. He has previously held positions at the University of California, Los Angeles and Idaho State University. He is also the founder and president of the Foundation for Anthropological Research and Environmental Studies (FARES). His work has been featured in 36 film documentaries and was the principal consultant for the movie Apocalypto, CBS' Survivor Guatemala, and National Geographic's The Story of God with Morgan Freeman.

He was also awarded the Orden de la Monja Blanca by the Guatemalan Ministry of Defense in 2019. He was named as "one of the 24 individuals that changed Latin America" and his work has been an important contribution to the understanding of the development of Maya civilization.

Richard D. Hansen is a specialist on the early ancient Maya civilization and directs the Mirador Basin Project, which investigate so a geological and cultural area known as the Mirador-Calakmul Karst Basin in the northern Petén, Guatemala. Archeological Research in the Petén, Guatemala Mirador Basin National Monument: The Cradle of Maya Civilization.

Hansen has been criticized by indigenous rights groups in Guatemala for his support of the Mirador-Calakmul Basin Maya Security and Conservation Partnership Act of 2019. Opponents have accused him of attacking the land rights of indigenous peoples and disrespecting the existing conservation laws in Guatemala.

== FARES ==
He is the founder and president of the Foundation for Anthropological Research and Environmental Studies (FARES), a non-profit scientific research institution based in Idaho.

== Academia ==
He graduated with a Ph.D. in Archaeology from UCLA in 1992 as a National Graduate Fellow, a Jacob Javits National Fellow, the UCLA Hortense Fishbaugh Memorial Scholar, the UCLA Distinguished Scholar (1988), a Fulbright Scholar (Guatemala) (1989-1990), the UCLA Outstanding Graduate Student (1991), and the UCLA Chancellor's Marshall with highest honors (1992).

He previously held a double major B.S. degree (cum laude) in Spanish and Archaeology from Brigham Young University in 1978, and a M.S. degree in Anthropology in 1984.

== Awards ==
He was recently named as "one of 24 individuals that changed Latin America" by Bravo Association, Latin Trade Magazine, Dec. He was awarded the highest civilian award possible in Guatemala, the Gran Cruz of the Order of Quetzal on March 9, 2017 in the National Palace by President Jimmy Morales and Minister Jose Luis Chea. He received the "Orden de la Monja Blanca) (highest civilian award possible) from the Ministry of Defense of Guatemala in November 2019. He was named the 2014 Kislak Lecturer at the U.S. Library of Congress, and was honored as the "Chevalier des Arts et des Lettres" of the "Ordre des Arts et Lettres" by the French Ministry of Culture in 2012. He was awarded the "Orden del Pop" by Francisco Marroquin University in Guatemala in 2012. He was awarded the highest Idaho State University Achievement Award 2009 and was named Environmentalist of the Year in Latin America 2008 by the 161,000 members of the Latin Trade Bravo Business Association. He was awarded the National Order of the Cultural Patrimony of Guatemala by Guatemalan President Oscar Berger in December 2005.

He was the founder of the Dialogue of Civilizations Conferences hosted by the National Geographic Society, with recent conferences in Guatemala, Turkey, and China and more scheduled for India and Egypt. Hansen was the co-founder of the Guatemala-China Association for Culture, Tourism and Sports based in Guatemala City.

== Publications ==
He has published 3 books (2 as series editor), and is the editor of three more volumes currently in preparation. In addition, he has published 190 papers and book chapters in scientific and popular publications and has presented more than 393 professional papers and technical reports in scientific formats and symposia throughout the world. As a project, his team has currently published 318 scientific papers, abstracts, and book chapters, and 1209 technical reports and scientific presentations

== Locations ==
He has conducted and/or directed archaeological research in Israel, the U.S. Great Basin, U.S. Southwest, and Central America. Hansen's research in the remote rainforests of northern Guatemala currently involves scholars from dozens of universities and research institutions from throughout the world.

His team has mapped and excavated in 51 ancient cities in the Mirador Basin. Hansen's studies have identified some of the largest and earliest ancient cities in Central America, and his work has been an important contribution to the developmental history of Maya civilization.
