= Uaxactun =

Mayan sacred place in present-day Guatemala

Coordinates: 17°23′36.82″N 89°38′4.32″W

- Location within Guatemala
- Region: Petén Department, Guatemala

City glyph

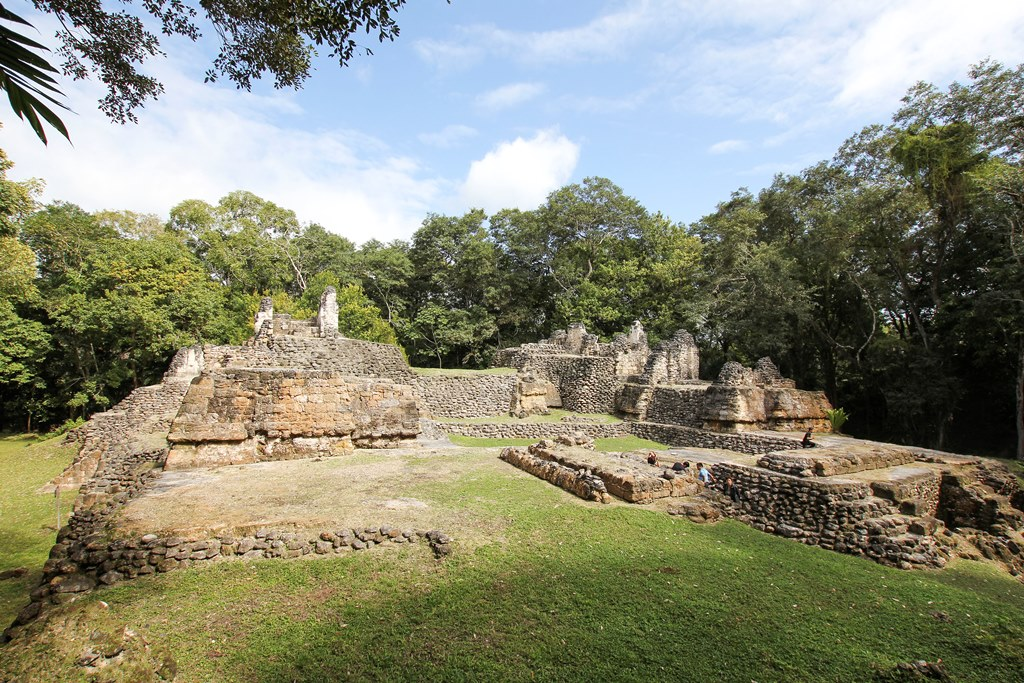

Uaxactun (pronounced [waʃakˈtun]) is an ancient sacred place of the Maya civilization, located in the Petén Basin region of the Maya lowlands, in the present-day department of Petén, Guatemala. The site lies some 12 miles (19 km) north of the major center of Tikal. The name is sometimes spelled as Waxaktun.

== History of discovery ==
Despite the achievements in the decipherment of the ancient Maya hieroglyphic writing system since the 1990s, the ancient name of the site remains unclear. It may have shared a name with Yaxchilan, Pa’ Chan, although some lords of Uaxactun used the title “king of Kʹanwitz”, which may have referred to one of the ceremonial centres. A name for the site commonly given online is Siaan K'aan or Sian Ka'an, translated as "Born in Heaven", likely originating from Siyajchan ("Giving birth sky"), an earlier mistranslation of the Pa’ Chan ("Split sky") emblem glyph.

The name Uaxactun was given to the site by its rediscoverer, archaeologist Sylvanus Morley, in May 1916. He coined the name from Maya words Waxac and Tun, to mean "Eight Stones". The name has two meanings; Morley's stated reason for the name was to commemorate it as the first site where an inscription dating from the 8th Baktún of the Maya calendar was discovered (making it then the earliest known Maya date, corresponding the year 328 AD). The other meaning is a pun, since "Uaxactun" sounds like "Washington", the U.S. capital and home of the Carnegie Institute which funded Morley's explorations.

Morley's initial investigation of the site mostly focused on the hieroglyphic inscriptions; after that Uaxactun was not visited again until 1924, when Frans Blom made a more detailed investigation of the structures and mapped the site. The Carnegie Institution conducted archeological excavations there from 1926 through 1937, led by Oliver Ricketson. The excavations added greatly to knowledge of the early Classic and pre-Classic Maya.

Significantly, these early excavations led to the identification and naming of the "E-Group" architectural complex, as Group E at Uaxactun served as the structural archetype used by Mayanists to define Maya astronomical alignment and solstitial observation complexes across the Lowlands. The remains of several badly ruined late Classic era temple-pyramids were removed, revealing well-preserved earlier temples underneath them.

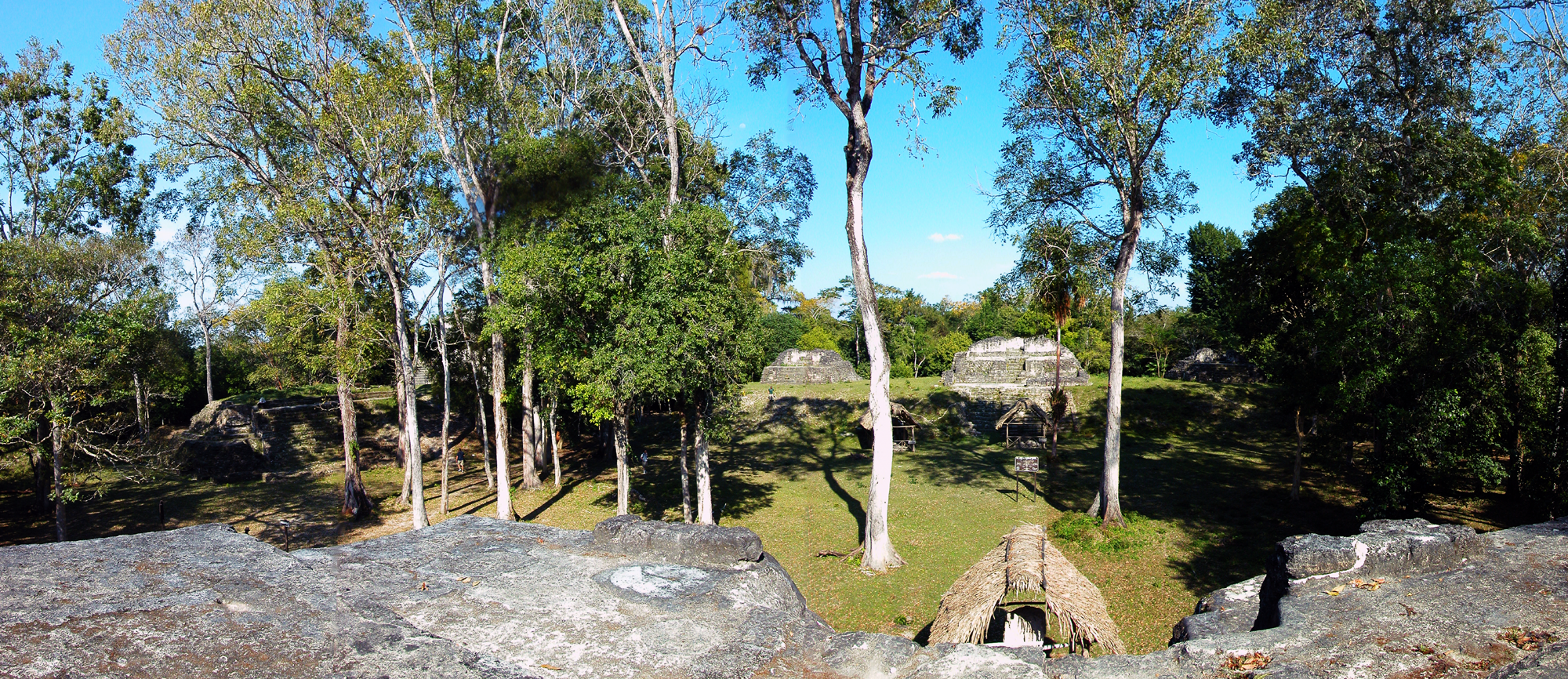
View of E Group from the temple of masks at Uaxactun

For most of the Carnegie team's time at Uaxactun, communication with the outside world was via a four-day mule convoy to El Cayo, British Honduras. Towards the end of the time an airstrip was opened. Flights to Uaxactun continued and a small village grew there, as it became a center for gathering of chicle sap from the Petén jungle. In 1940 A. L. Smith and Ed Shook of the Carnegie project returned to make some additional excavations. In the late 1970s a rough road was opened, connecting Uaxactun to Tikal and thence to Flores, Guatemala. Air flights were discontinued. In 1984 the road was much improved. Shook returned again in 1974 to oversee consolidation and restoration of some architecture excavated earlier. In 1982 Guatemala's Tikal National Park was expanded to include the ruins of Uaxactun within its protected area. In 1990 the Maya Biosphere Reserve (MBR) was created, including Uaxactun as a part of the reserve's Multiple Use Zone.

In 2009 an excavation project of Slovak Archaeological and Historical Institute (SAHI) was started by professor Milan Kováč.

== Geoarchaeology and Karst Hydrogeology ==
The spatial organization of Uaxactun was dictated by the structural geology of the central Petén Basin, where Cretaceous limestone uplands are intersected by expansive bajo depression systems. Because the site lacks perennial rivers, ancient urban sustainment depended on artificial aguada reservoirs and localized micro-catchments designed to capture intense monsoon runoff.

- Bajo Margin Edafology: Soil core profiles around the central core reveal thick layers of anthropogenic "Maya clay" siltation, recording intensive Early Classic terrace farming and forest canopy clearance across the surrounding karst ridges.
- Karst Hydrology and Reservoir Engineering: Urban aguadas were lined with compacted montmorillonite clay and paved limestone blocks to minimize seepage loss through the permeable bedrock during the dry season.
- E-Group Geo-alignment: The architectural placement of Group E exploited natural limestone topography, elevating the eastern observation structures above the seasonal wetland horizon to optimize line-of-sight solar horizon alignments during solstices and equinoxes.

== Conquest of Uaxactun by Siyaj K'ak' ==
Linda Schele, in A Forest of Kings, devotes an entire chapter to a war between Tikal and Uaxactun, in which Uaxactun was defeated by forces led by Fire is Born (Siyaj K'ak', formerly identified as Smoking Frog) of Tikal. In this chapter, she also gives a brief overview of the known history of Uaxactun up to the final year of the war (378 AD) and of the Uaxactun kings who claimed descent from Fire is Born. The combined political entity of Tikal-Uaxactun dominated the Guatemalan Petén for the following 180 years.

Siyaj K'ak' might have come from Teotihuacán, been the general of the Teotihuacano ruler Spearthrower Owl, and conquered Tikal earlier the same year. This was a watershed moment of the Classic Maya. Some scholars suggested that new kings were installed at Tikal, Uaxactun, Rio Azul, El Peru, El Zapote and Bejucal during the Teotihuacan intrusions, new rituals and images were introduced, and a new order was established in the Maya Lowlands, while others suggested a less hegemonic role of Teotihuacan in its relationship with the Maya.

== After 378 AD ==
After the conquest by Siyaj K'ak' in 378 AD, Uaxactun was still able to keep elite prerogatives of monument carving, temple erection, and rich burials during most of the Early Classic era. During the Hiatus period (about 600 AD) between Early Classic and Late Classic, Uaxactun experienced a lack of architectural activity and ceramic production, which coincided with the decline of the power of Teotihuacán and Tikal. There was no erection of dedicatory monuments between 554 AD and 711 AD. By the middle of Late Classic, Uaxactun showed evidences of population increase, new construction, remodeling of old structures, and appearance of new residential areas, plaza groups, and buildings. There was a time of distinctive population decrease towards the end of Late Classic. The last inscribed monument in Uaxactun is dated to 889. By the end of Terminal Classic, Uaxactun and Tikal were virtually abandoned.

== References in popular culture ==
The Italian composer Giacinto Scelsi composed a piece in 1966 entitled Uaxuctum. It is subtitled: "The legend of the Maya city, destroyed by themselves for religious reasons".

Uaxactun was the location mentioned in the opening scene of the 1994 video game Pitfall: The Mayan Adventure. The game was released on various platforms from 1994 until 2009.
