= Outline of Guatemala =

Country in Central America

The Flag of Guatemala

The Coat of arms of Guatemala

The location of Guatemala

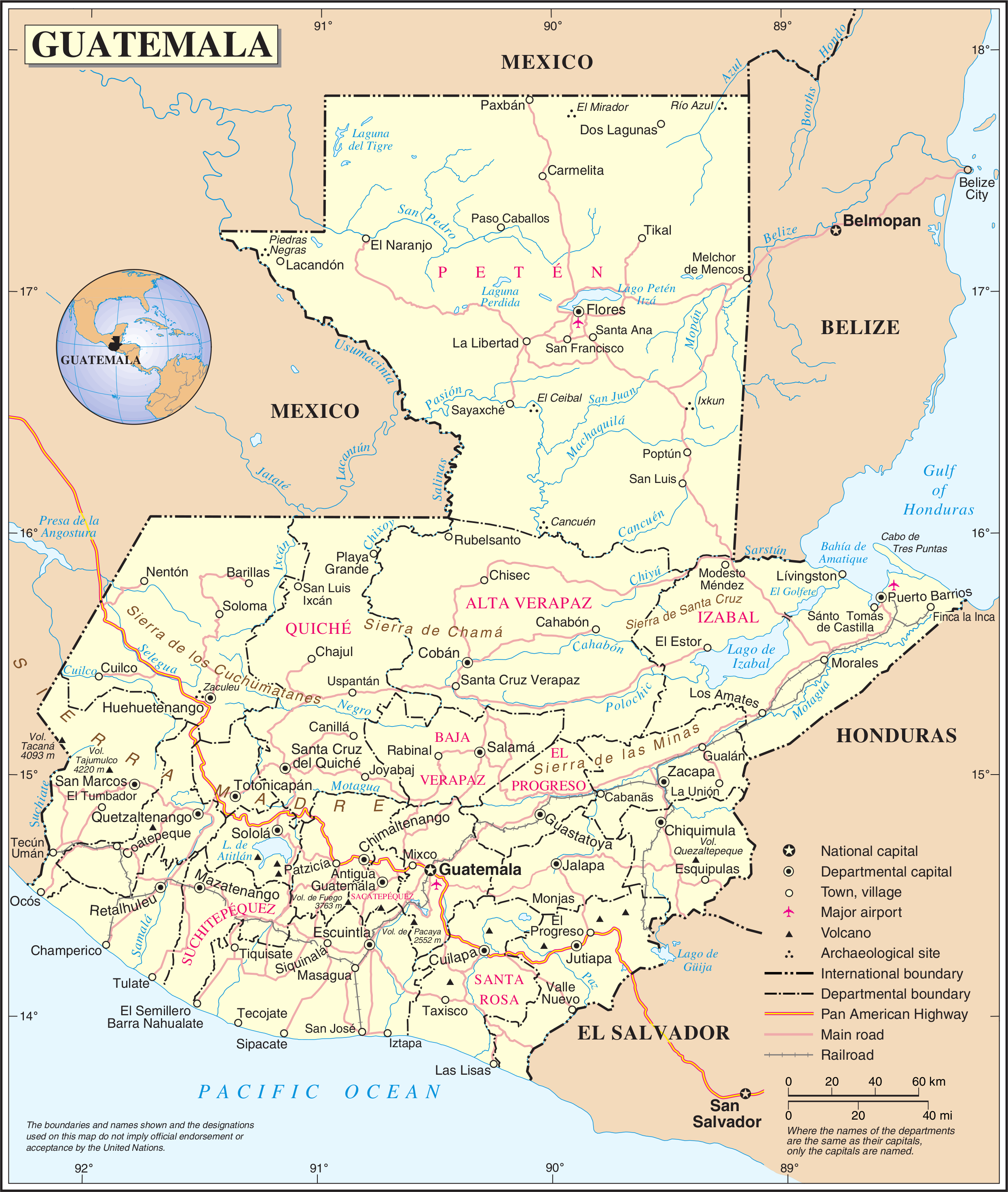
An enlargeable map of the Republic of Guatemala

The following outline is provided as an overview of and topical guide to Guatemala:

Guatemala – sovereign country located in Central America bordering Mexico to the northwest, the Pacific Ocean to the southwest, Belize and the Caribbean Sea to the northeast, and Honduras and El Salvador to the southeast.

A representative democracy, its capital is Guatemala City. The nation has been stable since the conclusion of the Civil War in 1996 and has been in a state of continuous development and economic growth. Guatemala's abundance of biologically significant and unique ecosystems contribute to Mesoamerica's designation as a biodiversity hotspot.

== General reference ==
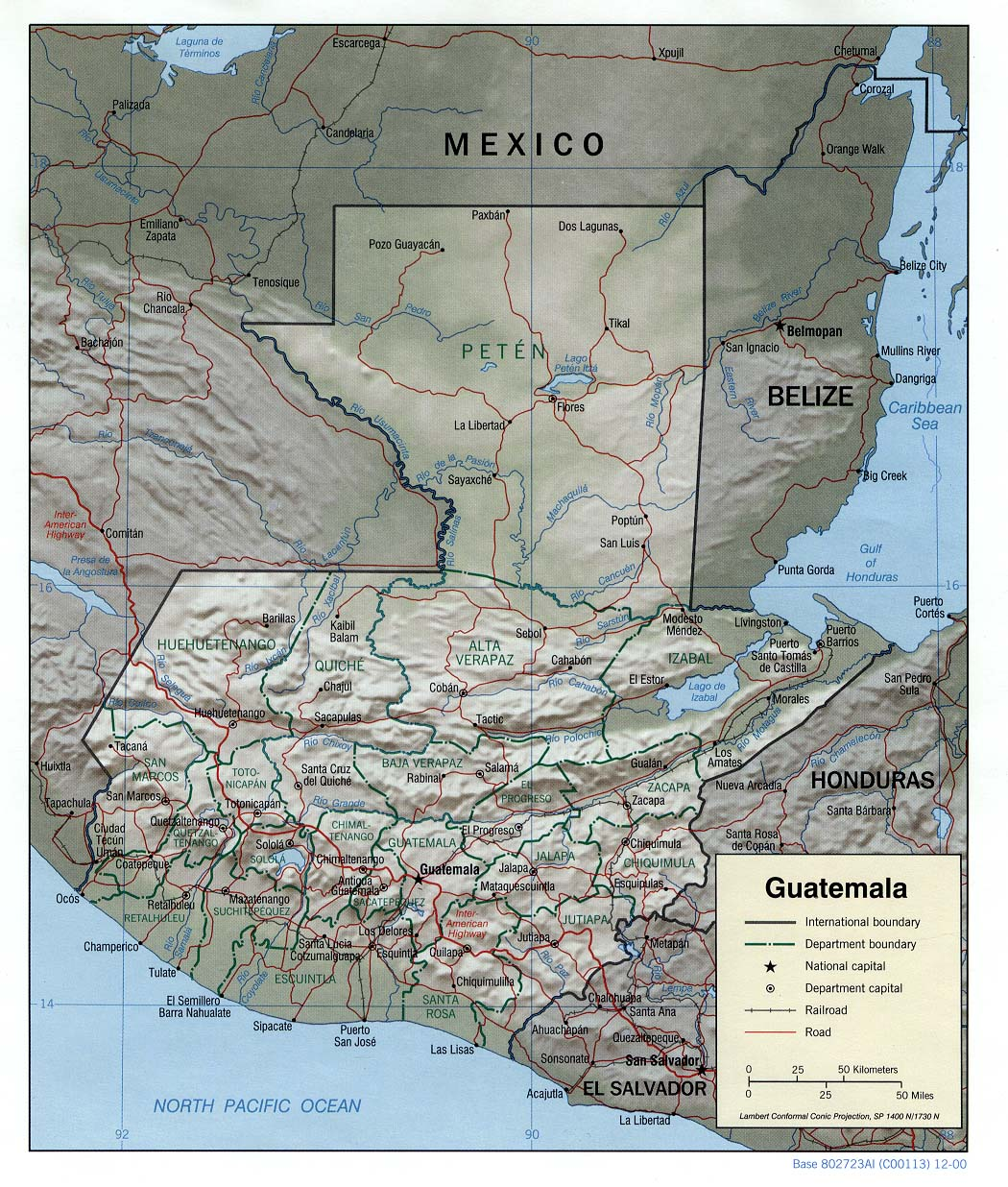
An enlargeable relief map of Guatemala

- Pronunciation: /ɡwɑːtəˈmɑːlə/
- Common English country name: Guatemala
- Official English country name: The Republic of Guatemala
- Common endonym(s):
- Official endonym(s):
- Adjectival(s): Guatemalan, Chapin
- Demonym(s):
- Etymology: Name of Guatemala
- International rankings of Guatemala
- ISO country codes: GT, GTM, 320
- ISO region codes: See ISO 3166-2:GT
- Internet country code top-level domain: .gt

== Geography of Guatemala ==
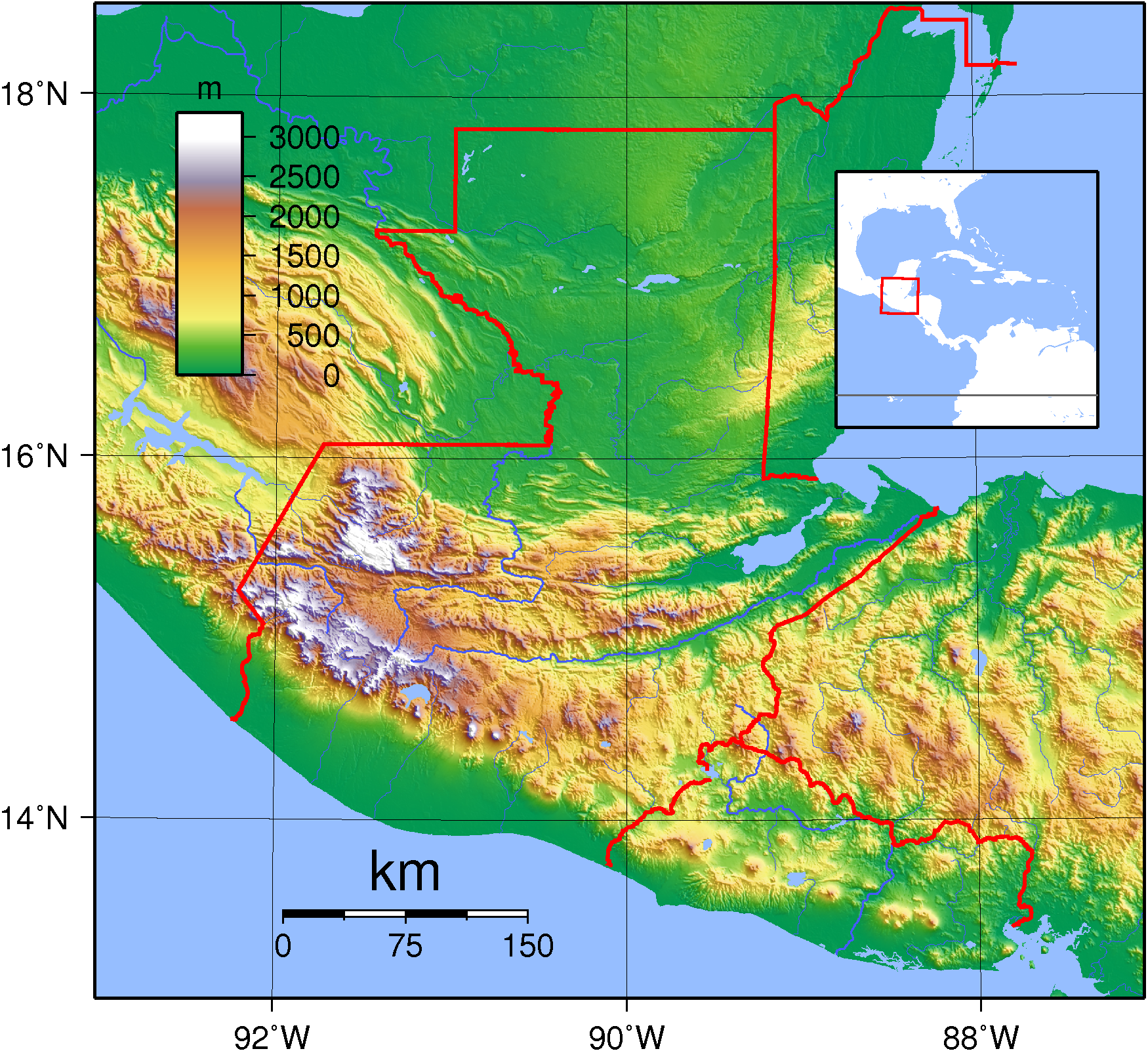
An enlargeable topographic map of Guatemala

Geography of Guatemala

- Guatemala is: a country
- Location:
  - Northern Hemisphere and Western Hemisphere
    - Americas
      - North America
        - Middle America
          - Central America
  - Time zone: Central Standard Time (UTC-06)
  - Extreme points of Guatemala
    - High: Volcán Tajumulco 4,220 m (13,845 ft)
    - Low: North Pacific Ocean and Caribbean Sea 0 m
  - Land boundaries: 1,687 km

Mexico 962 km
Belize 266 km
Honduras 256 km
El Salvador 203 km

- Coastline: 400 km

- Population of Guatemala: 14,027,000; Demographics of Guatemala
- Area of Guatemala: 108,890 km^{2}
- Atlas of Guatemala

=== Environment of Guatemala ===
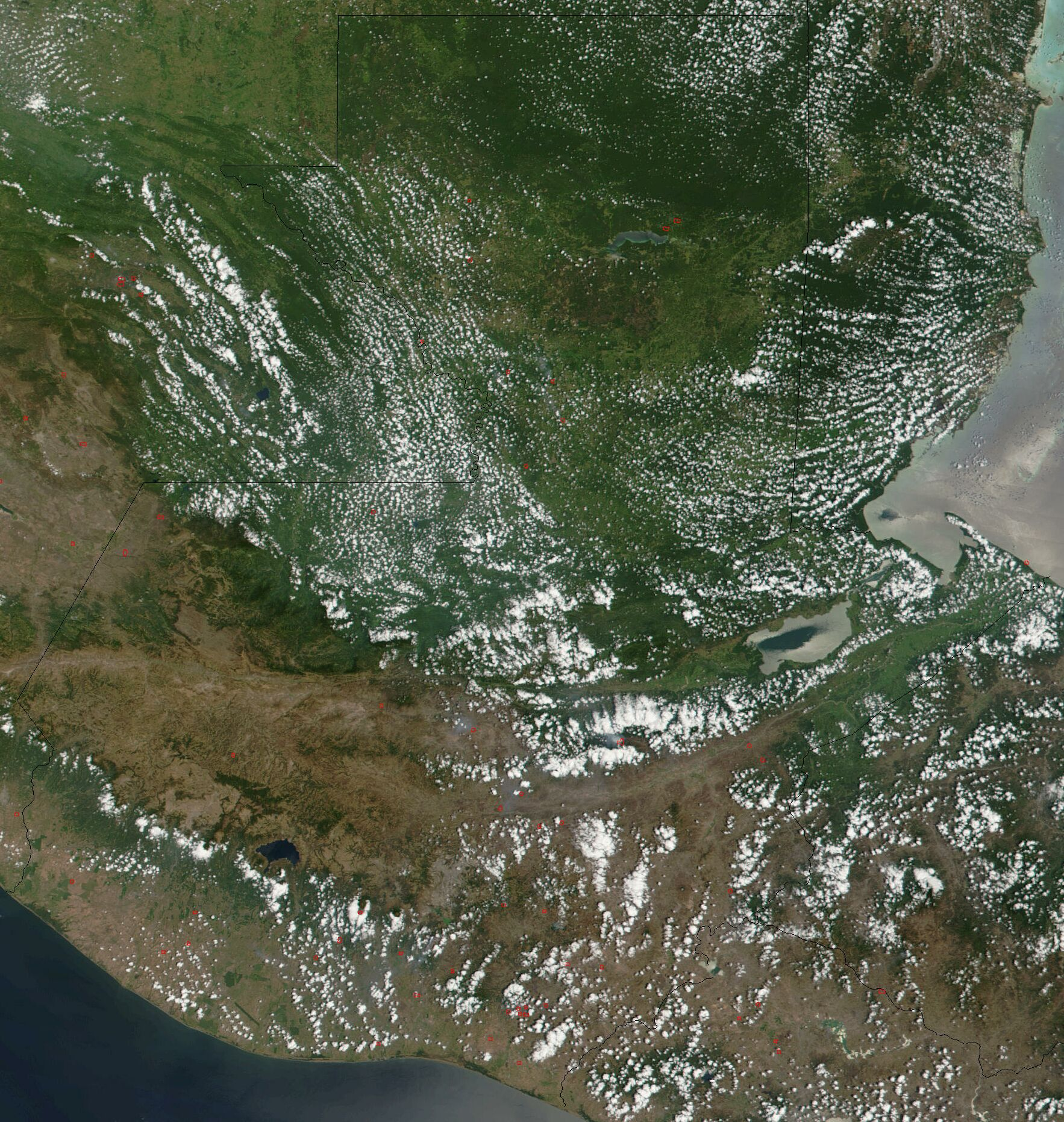
An enlargeable satellite image of Guatemala

- Climate of Guatemala
- Holdridge life zones in Guatemala
- Geology of Guatemala
  - List of earthquakes in Guatemala
- Protected areas of Guatemala
  - Biosphere reserves in Guatemala
  - National parks of Guatemala
- Wildlife of Guatemala
  - Fauna of Guatemala
    - Birds of Guatemala
    - Mammals of Guatemala
  - Flora of Guatemala
    - Trees of Guatemala

==== Natural geographic features of Guatemala ====
- Islands of Guatemala
- Lakes of Guatemala
- Mountains of Guatemala
  - Volcanoes in Guatemala
- Rivers of Guatemala
- World Heritage Sites in Guatemala

=== Regions of Guatemala ===
==== Administrative divisions of Guatemala ====
  - Departments of Guatemala
    - Municipalities of Guatemala

===== Departments of Guatemala =====
Departments of Guatemala

===== Municipalities of Guatemala =====
Municipalities of Guatemala

- Capital of Guatemala: Guatemala City
- Cities of Guatemala

=== Demography of Guatemala ===
Demographics of Guatemala

== Government and politics of Guatemala ==
Politics of Guatemala

- Form of government: unitary presidential representative democratic republic
- Capital of Guatemala: Guatemala City
- Elections in Guatemala
  - 1974, 1978, 1982, 1986, 1990, 1994, 1995-96, 1999, 2003, 2007, 2011, 2015, 2019, 2023
- Political parties in Guatemala

=== Branches of the government of Guatemala ===
Government of Guatemala

==== Executive branch of the government of Guatemala ====
- Head of state: President of Guatemala, Bernardo Arévalo (2024–incumbent)
- Head of government: President of Guatemala
- Cabinet of Guatemala
- Ministries of Guatemala
- Secretariats of the Presidency of Guatemala

==== Legislative branch of the government of Guatemala ====
- Congress of the Republic (unicameral)

==== Judicial branch of the government of Guatemala ====
Court system of Guatemala

- Supreme Court of Guatemala

=== Foreign relations of Guatemala ===
Foreign relations of Guatemala

- Diplomatic missions in Guatemala
- Diplomatic missions of Guatemala

==== International organization membership ====
The Republic of Guatemala is a member of:

- Agency for the Prohibition of Nuclear Weapons in Latin America and the Caribbean (OPANAL)
- Central American Bank for Economic Integration (BCIE)
- Central American Common Market (CACM)
- Central American Integration System (SICA)
- Food and Agriculture Organization (FAO)
- Group of 24 (G24)
- Group of 77 (G77)
- Inter-American Development Bank (IADB)
- International Atomic Energy Agency (IAEA)
- International Bank for Reconstruction and Development (IBRD)
- International Chamber of Commerce (ICC)
- International Civil Aviation Organization (ICAO)
- International Criminal Police Organization (Interpol)
- International Development Association (IDA)
- International Federation of Red Cross and Red Crescent Societies (IFRCS)
- International Finance Corporation (IFC)
- International Fund for Agricultural Development (IFAD)
- International Hydrographic Organization (IHO)
- International Labour Organization (ILO)
- International Maritime Organization (IMO)
- International Monetary Fund (IMF)
- International Olympic Committee (IOC)
- International Organization for Migration (IOM)
- International Organization for Standardization (ISO) (correspondent)
- International Red Cross and Red Crescent Movement (ICRM)
- International Telecommunication Union (ITU)
- International Telecommunications Satellite Organization (ITSO)
- International Trade Union Confederation (ITUC)
- Inter-Parliamentary Union (IPU)
- Latin American Economic System (LAES)
- Latin American Integration Association (LAIA) (observer)
- Multilateral Investment Guarantee Agency (MIGA)
- Nonaligned Movement (NAM)
- Organisation for the Prohibition of Chemical Weapons (OPCW)
- Organization of American States (OAS)
- Permanent Court of Arbitration (PCA)
- Rio Group (RG)
- Unión Latina
- United Nations (UN)
- United Nations Conference on Trade and Development (UNCTAD)
- United Nations Educational, Scientific, and Cultural Organization (UNESCO)
- United Nations Industrial Development Organization (UNIDO)
- United Nations Interim Force in Lebanon (UNIFIL)
- United Nations Mission in the Sudan (UNMIS)
- United Nations Operation in Cote d'Ivoire (UNOCI)
- United Nations Organization Mission in the Democratic Republic of the Congo (MONUC)
- United Nations Stabilization Mission in Haiti (MINUSTAH)
- Universal Postal Union (UPU)
- World Confederation of Labour (WCL)
- World Customs Organization (WCO)
- World Federation of Trade Unions (WFTU)
- World Health Organization (WHO)
- World Intellectual Property Organization (WIPO)
- World Meteorological Organization (WMO)
- World Tourism Organization (UNWTO)
- World Trade Organization (WTO)

=== Law and order in Guatemala ===
Law of Guatemala

- Capital punishment in Guatemala
- Constitution of Guatemala
- Crime in Guatemala
- Human rights in Guatemala
  - LGBT rights in Guatemala
  - Freedom of religion in Guatemala
- Law enforcement in Guatemala

=== Military of Guatemala ===
Military of Guatemala

- Command
  - Commander-in-chief: President of Guatemala, Bernardo Arévalo
    - Ministry of Defence of Guatemala
    - Military Chief of Staff
- Forces
  - Army of Guatemala
  - Navy of Guatemala
  - Air Force of Guatemala
  - Special forces of Guatemala
    - Kaibiles

== History of Guatemala ==
History of Guatemala

== Culture of Guatemala ==
Culture of Guatemala

- Cuisine of Guatemala
- Languages of Guatemala
- National symbols of Guatemala
  - Coat of arms of Guatemala
  - Flag of Guatemala
  - National anthem of Guatemala
- People of Guatemala
- Prostitution in Guatemala
- Religion in Guatemala
  - Buddhism in Guatemala
  - Islam in Guatemala
- World Heritage Sites in Guatemala

=== Art in Guatemala ===
- Literature of Guatemala
- Music of Guatemala

=== Sports in Guatemala ===
- Football in Guatemala
- Guatemala at the Olympics

== Economy and infrastructure of Guatemala ==
Economy of Guatemala

- Economic rank, by nominal GDP (2007): 78th (seventy-eighth)
- Banking in Guatemala
  - Bank of Guatemala (central bank)
- Communications in Guatemala
  - Internet in Guatemala
- Companies of Guatemala
- Currency of Guatemala: Quetzal
  - ISO 4217: GTQ
- Guatemala Stock Exchange
- Transport in Guatemala
- Transportation in Guatemala
  - Airports in Guatemala
  - Rail transport in Guatemala
- Tourism in Guatemala
- Water supply and sanitation in Guatemala

== Education in Guatemala ==
Education in Guatemala

== See also ==
- List of international rankings
- Member state of the United Nations
- Outline of geography
  - Outline of North America
