= Biosphere reserves of Guatemala =

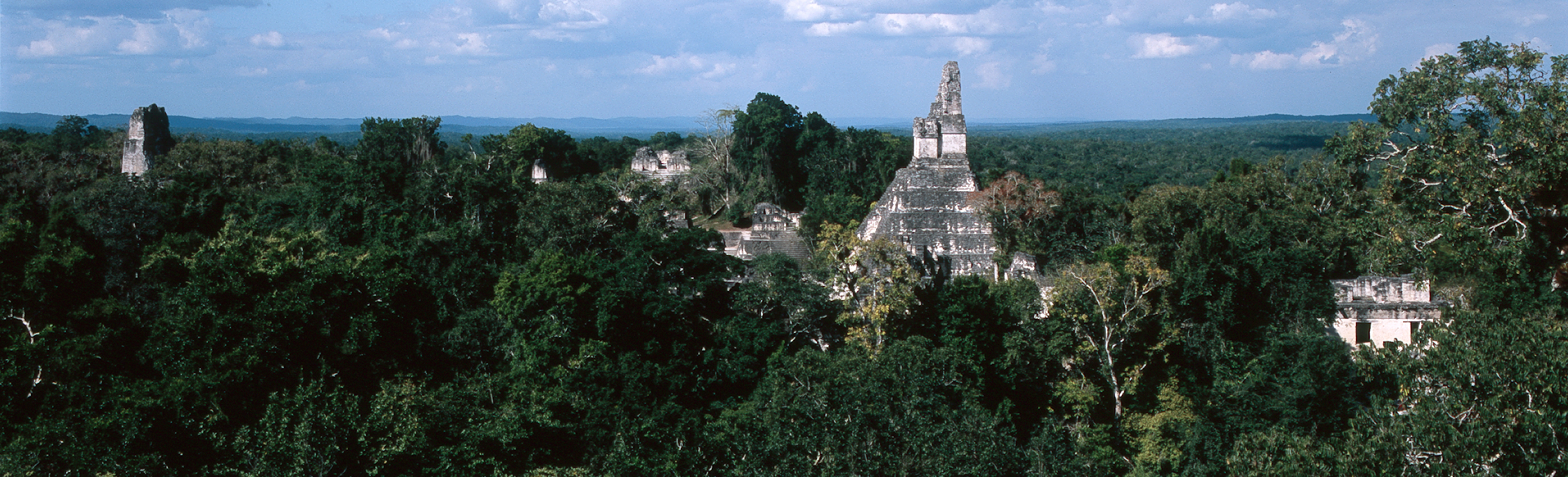
Biosphere reserves of Guatemala
Tikal National Park in the Maya biosphere reserve
First reserve	Tikal, 1955
Smallest reserve:	Trifinio, 8,000 Ha.
Largest reserve	Maya, 814,324 Ha.
Governing body	CONAP

Biosphere reserves in Guatemala include:

- Maya in El Petén
- Tikal in El Petén
- Montañas Mayas Chiquibul in El Petén
- Trifinio in Chiquimula
- Sierra de las Minas in Alta Verapaz, Baja Verapaz. El Progreso, Zacapa, Izabal
- Visis Cabá in El Quiché

== See also ==
- List of national parks of Guatemala
