= List of national parks of Guatemala =

Guatemala has several national parks managed by Consejo Nacional de Areas Protegidas.

== National parks ==
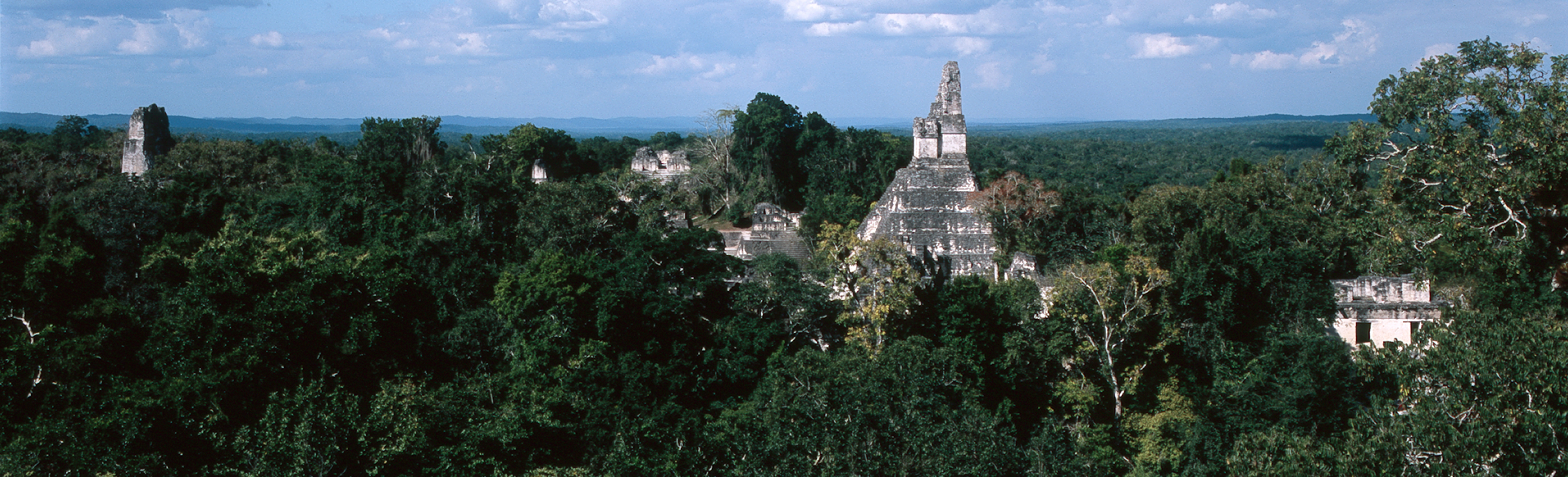
Tikal National Park contains Mayan temples.

National Park	Department
Candelaria Caves	Alta Verapaz
Cerro El Baúl	Quetzaltenango
Cerro El Reformador	El Progreso
Cerro Miramundo	Zacapa
Cuevas del Silvino	Izabal
El Rosario	Petén
Grutas de Lanquín	Alta Verapaz
Laguna del Tigre	Petén
Laguna El Pino	Santa Rosa
Laguna Lachuá	Alta Verapaz
Las Victorias	Alta Verapaz
Los Aposentos	Chimaltenango
Mirador Río Azul	Petén
Naciones Unidas	Guatemala
Pacaya	Escuintla
Río Dulce	Izabal
Riscos de Momostenango	Totonicapán
San José la Colonia	Alta Verapaz
Sierra del Lacandón	Petén
Sipacate-Naranjo	Escuintla
Tikal	Petén
Yaxhá-Nakúm-Naranjo	Petén

== See also ==
- Biosphere reserves of Guatemala
