= Marie André Destarac =

Guatemalan scientist

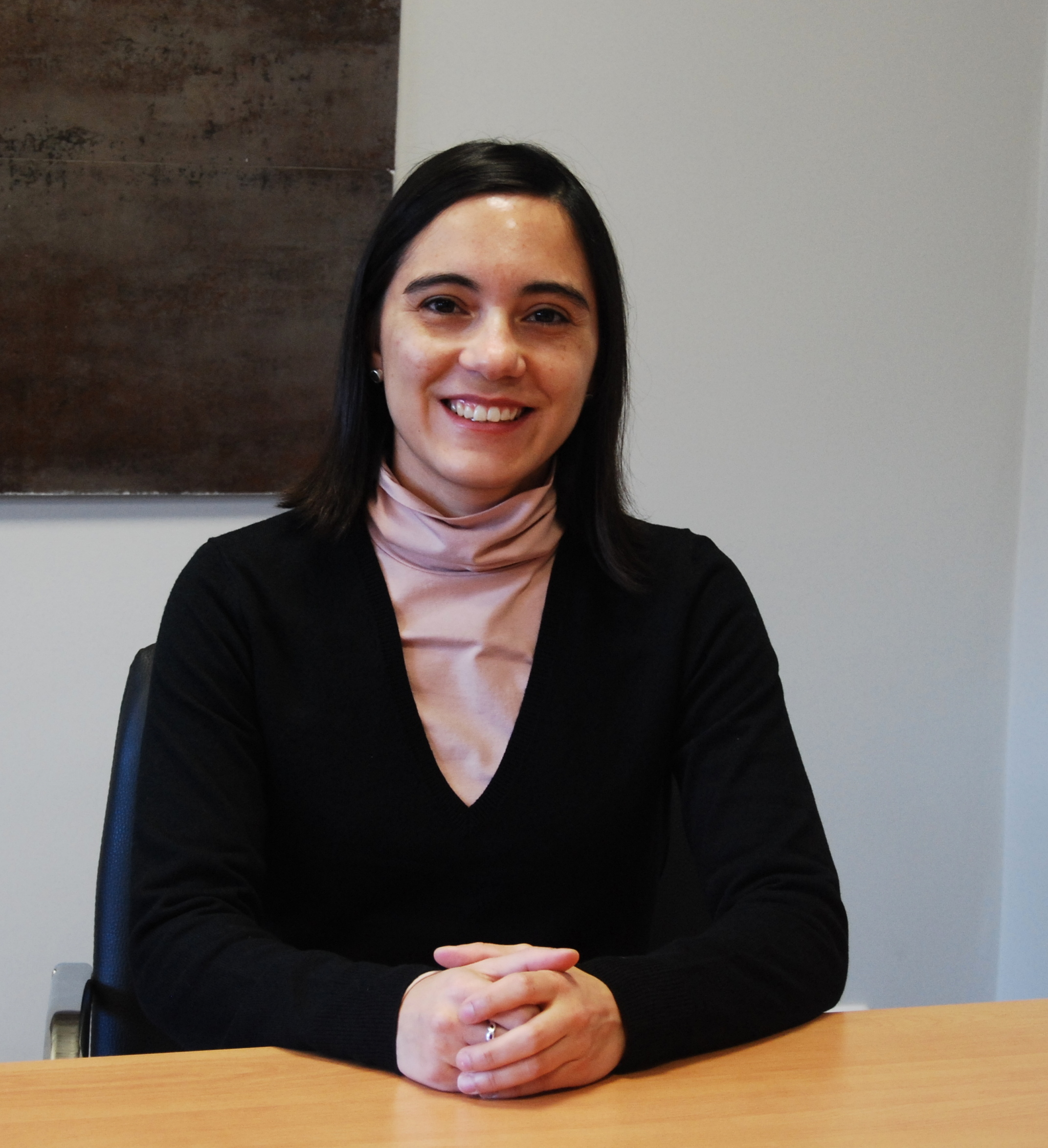
- Born: February 25, 1981 (age 45); Guatemala City, Guatemala
- Education: Universidad del Valle de Guatemala; Technical University of Madrid (M.S., Ph.D.)
- Awards: Innovators Under 35

Marie André Destarac Eguizabal (born 25 February 1981) is a Guatemalan scientist who specializes in engineering, electronics and robotics. Her goal is to apply her engineering knowledge and expertise in medicine projects. In 2015, Destarac was recognized by MIT Technology Review with the "Innovators under 35 in Central America" award. She was the only woman to receive the award that year. She is an active member of the Organization For Women In Science For The Developing World, Guatemala chapter (OWSD GT) executing and planning events to decrease the gender gap, so girls and women can study careers in STEM.

== Early life and education ==
Marie André Destarac is daughter of Rodolfo Destarac and María Eguizabal. She studied electronic engineering at Universidad del Valle de Guatemala. In 2013 she received a master's degree in Robotics and Automation from the Technical University of Madrid with a scholarship she received from the Education, Culture and Sports Minister of Spain. In 2018, she received a Ph.D. in Robotics by the Technical University of Madrid by the Industrial Ph.D. scholarships program with the support of the Ministry of Economy and Competitiveness (MINECO) of Spain.

== Career ==
Since 2005, Destarac works in research projects in Guatemala, Japan and Spain, her field of work is automation, robotics and medical devices development. She's been a professor at her alma mater Universidad del Valle de Guatemala, teaching computer science, engineering and electronics. She was also the coordinator of innovation research projects to support students to get their Bachelor's degree. Destarac worked as Senior robotics engineer at Aura Innovative Robotics, a startup company from Spain, committed to develop medical devices; later Destarac was hired by the Spanish National Research Council as a postdoctoral researcher.

Destarac currently works as a project manager for the ATLAS pediatric exoskeleton in Madrid, Spain, focusing on device optimization and coordinating and supervising rehabilitation sessions with children using the exoskeleton and on the impact of using robotics on children with walking impairment diseases. Destarac runs the human walking analysis laboratory at the Robotics and Automation Center at CSIC.

=== Robotics and health ===
Destarac has researched the creation of exoskeletons to help treat shoulder and elbow injuries as part of her Ph.D. studies. She's focused on creating a 3D simulation that replicates the muscular behavior and shows injured zones, the importance of this simulator lies on allowing doctors to test treatment through simulation and then apply to patients, Destarac is also working on building adaptive control systems for exoskeleton rehabilitation, these systems intelligently and in real time adapt the response of the exoskeleton to the needs of the patient.

== Published papers ==
=== Scientific ===
1. Manuel Cardona, Marie André Destarac and Cecilia E. García. “Exoskeleton Robots for Rehabilitation: State of the Art and Future Trends”. IEEE 37th Central America and Panama Convention (CONCAPAN XXXVII), Managua, Nicaragua, 2017, pp. 1–6. doi:10.1109/CONCAPAN.2017.8278480
2. Ricardo Espinoza Gomez, Marie André Destarac, Manuel N. Cardona Gutierrez, Jorge Garcia Montaño, María Camila Sierra Herrera, Rafael Acebron Lopez, Lisandro Jose Puglisi and Cecilia Garcia Cena. “ORTE Exoskeleton: Actuation System Dimensioning and Selection”. IEEE 37th Central America and Panama Convention (CONCAPAN XXXVII), Managua, Nicaragua, 2017, pp. 1–6. doi:10.1109/CONCAPAN.2017.8278493
3. Ricardo Espinoza, Marie André Destarac, Jorge García, Rafael Acebrón, Lisandro Puglisi y Cecilia García. “ORTE-Sistema Robotizado para la rehabilitación del miembro superior”. Libro de actas de las Jornadas Nacionales de Robótica 2017. M. Mellado, A. Sánchez y E. Bernabeu (Eds.) Editorial CEA-IFAC, España, 2017, artículo 32. ISBN 978-84-697-3742-2.
4. Marie André Destarac, Cecilia E. García Cena, Adrián Mérida Martínez, Luis J. Monge Chamorro and Roque Saltarén Pazmiño. “Analysis of the influence of external actuators on the glenohumeral joint movements”. Advances in Automation and Robotics Research in Latin America. I. Chang, J. Baca, H. A. Moreno, I. G. Carrera and M. Cardona (Eds.) Springer International Publishing, 2017, pp. 71–82. ISBN 978-3-319-54377-2.
5. Jorge García Montaño, Cecilia E. García Cena, Luis J. Monge Chamorro, Marie André Destarac and Roque Saltarén Pazmiño. “Mechanical Design of a Robotic Exoskeleton for Upper Limb Rehabilitation”. Advances in Automation and Robotics Research in Latin America. I. Chang, J. Baca, H. A. Moreno, I. G. Carrera and M. Cardona (Eds.) Springer International Publishing, 2017, pp. 297–308. ISBN 978-3-319-54377-2.
6. Marie André Destarac, Cecilia E. García Cena and Roque Saltarén Pazmiño. “Simulation of the Length Change in Muscles during the Arm Rotation for the Upper Brachial Plexus Injury”. Converging Clinical and Engineering Research on Neurorehabilitation II. J. Ibáñez, J. Gonzalez-Vargas, J.M. Azorín, M. Akai and J. L. Pons (Eds.) Springer International Publishing, 2016, vol. 15, pp. 1263–1268. ISBN 978-3-319-46668-2.
7. Luis J. Monge, Cecilia E. García Cena, Marie André Destarac and Roque Saltarén Pazmiño. “Simulation of Rehabilitation Therapies for Brachial Plexus Injury under the Influence of External Actuators”. Converging Clinical and Engineering Research on Neurorehabilitation II. J. Ibáñez, J. Gonzalez-Vargas, J.M. Azorín, M. Akai and J. L. Pons (Eds.) Springer International Publishing, 2016, vol. 15, pp. 1043–1047. ISBN 978-3-319-46668-2.
8. Marie André Destarac, Cecilia E. García Cena, Roque Saltarén Pazmiño and Rafael Aracil. Kinematic and Kinetic simulation of Upper Brachial Plexus Injury in the Arm Rotation. Open Conference on Future Trends in Robotics. R. Fernández and H. Montes (Eds.) Consejo Superior de Investigaciones Científicas, mayo 2016, pp. 11–18. ISBN 978-84-608-8452-1.
9. Luis J. Monge, Marie André Destarac, Cecilia E. García Cena and Santiago Hernández. Modelling and Simulation of servomotors for a Rehabilitation Exoskeleton. Open Conference on Future Trends in Robotics. R. Fernández and H. Montes (Eds.) Consejo Superior de Investigaciones Científicas, mayo 2016, pp. 29–36. ISBN 978-84-608-8452-1.
10. Marie André Destarac, Cecilia E. García Cena, Roque Saltarén Pazmiño, Mónica J. Reyes Urbina, Javier López López and Ricardo Espinoza Gómez. Modeling and Simulation of Upper Brachial Plexus Injury. IEEE Systems Journal (Q1). doi:10.1109/JSYST.2014.2387426.
11. Cecilia E. García Cena, Roque Saltarén Pazmiño, Marie André Destarac, Edgar Loranca Vega, Ricardo Espinoza Gómez and Rafael Aracil Santonja. Skeletal Modeling, Analysis and Simulation of Upper Limb of Human Shoulder under Brachial Plexus Injury. Advances in Intelligent Systems and Computing ROBOT 2013, Advances in Robotics. M.A. Armada et al. (Eds.). New York Springer-Verlag, 2013, vol.1, pp. 195–207.
12. Donald Wise, Otto Benavides and Marie André Destarac. Using video conferencing for international teaching. IEEE 63rd Annual Conference International Council for Educational Media (ICEM), pp. 1–13, Oct. 2013.
13. Donald Wise, Otto Benavides and Marie André Destarac. A Case Study linking the US to Central America. TechTrends: Linking Research & Practice to Improve Learning, vol. 57, no.1, pp. 26–30. Springer US, Boston, Ene. 2013.
14. Johanna Viau Colindres. Corey Rountree, Marie Andre Destarac, Yiwen Cui, Manuel Perez Valdez, Mario Herrera Castellanos, Yvette Mirabal, Garrett Spiegel, Rebecca Richards-Kortum and Maria Oden. Prospective Randomized Controlled Study Comparing Low-Cost LED and Conventional Phototherapy for Treatment of Neonatal Hyperbilirubinemia. Journal of Tropical Pediatrics (Q3), vol.58, no.3, pp. 178–183, Jun. 2012.
15. Gerardo Martínez, Luis Reina, Mario Valdeavellano, Carlos Esquit and Marie Destarac. ANIMA: Non-Conventional Brain Computer Interfaces in Robot Control through Electroencephalography and Electrooculography: Motor Module. Proceedings of the Ninth Latin American and Caribbean Conference for Engineering and Technology (LACCEI 2011), Issue 206, Aug. 2011.
16. Luis F. Reina, Gerardo Martínez, Mario Valdeavellano, Marie Destarac and Carlos Esquit. “ANIMA: Non-Conventional Brain Computer Interfaces in Robot Control through Electroencephalography and Electrooculography: ARP Module” in Advances in Pattern Recognition MCPR 2010, LNCS 6256. J.A. Carrasco-Ochoa et al. (Eds.). New York: Springer-Verlag Berlin Heidelberg, 2010, pp. 71–79.
17. C. Tercero, E. Tijerino, S. Ikeda, H. Oura, T. Fukuda, M. Destarac, K. Sekiyama, M. Negoro and I.Takahashi. Feedback Control with Hybrid Pump for Realistic Human Blood Pressure Reconstruction. Proceedings of the 9th International IFAC Symposium on Robot Control, pp. 511–6, Sept. 2009.
18. C. Tercero, E. Tijerino, S. Ikeda, H. Oura, T. Fukuda, M. Destarac, K. Sekiyama, M. Negoro and I.Takahashi. Bomba híbrida para la simulación de la presión arterial humana. Revista de la Universidad del Valle de Guatemala, No. 19, pp. 9–14, Ago. 2009.

=== Columnist ===
- Desmitificando la robótica, Guatemala 2014. DiarioDigital
- La eternidad del Antiguo Egipto, Guatemala, 2014. DiarioDigital
- El robot que tardó un minuto en venderse. Guatemala, 2015. DiarioDigital
- Una cita con la robótica. Guatemala 2016. DiarioDigital

== Honors and awards ==
1. Award “Artífices de cambio: las mujeres en la innovación y la creatividad” scientific branch, Cámara de Comercio Americana, AmCham (April 2018).
2. Award “Guatemaltecos Ilustres” orator category, Seguros Universales de Guatemala (September 2017).
3. Award “Innovadores menores de 35-Centroamérica”, MIT Technology Review Spanish Edition (November 2015).
4. Speaker at TEDx-UVG “Ideas que valen ORO” (October 2015).
5. Nominee “Guatemalteca Ilustre” scientific branch, Seguros Universales, Guatemala (July 2015).
6. Award "Oficina Nacional de la Mujer del área metropolitana" medal by Guatemala government. (2021)
