= Mario Roberto Paz =

Guatemalan politician

Mario Roberto Paz is a Guatemalan politician. He is a member of the center-right National Advancement Party. He served as a member of the Congress of Guatemala.

He was trained as an architect. In Congress, he was Chairman of the Telecommunications Committee and led to the breaking up of GUATEL (now known as Claro Guatemala) and the privatization of telecommunications in Guatemala.
