= Tourism in Guatemala =

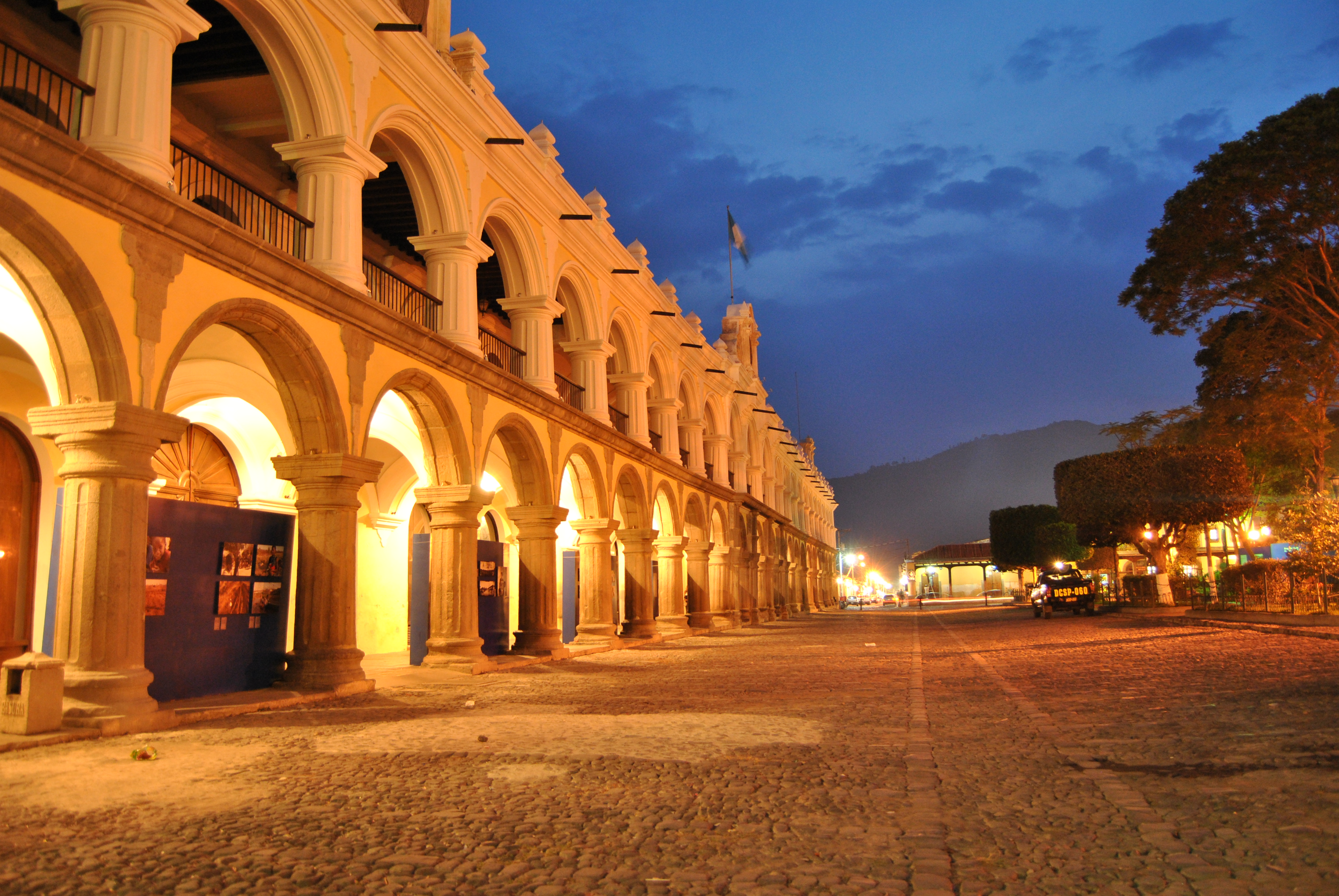
Capitanes Generales Palace in Antigua

Tourism became one of the main drivers of Guatemala's economy, an industry that reported more than $1.8 billion in 2008. Guatemala receives about two million tourists annually.

In recent years, it has led to the visit of many cruise ships that touch important seaports in Guatemala, leading to more tourists visiting the country.

The country's territory encompasses major Classic and Preclassic Maya archaeological centers, including Tikal and El Mirador in the Petén Basin, Quiriguá in Izabal, and Iximche in Chimaltenango. Major natural attractions feature the endorheic volcanic basin of Lake Atitlán and the travertine karst formations of Semuc Champey along the Cahabón River. Cultural and historical tourism centers heavily on Antigua Guatemala, a former Spanish colonial capital designated as a UNESCO World Heritage Site in 1979 for its preserved Baroque architecture and urban grid.

== Heritage ==
Tourism in Guatemala has grown gradually. The increase of appeal stands from the diverse natural environment and its beaches of white sand and dark sand, coral reefs, flora and fauna, archaeological sites, its colonial history, and its culture expressed in their customs and traditional foods.

There is a strong interest of the international community for archaeological sites like the city of Tikal, which was built and occupied in a period where the Mayan culture had its most literal and artistic expression, and was ruled by a dynasty of 16 kings. The Mayas of Tikal built many temples, a ball park, altars and steles in high and low relief.

Guatemala is very popular for its archaeological sites, pre-Hispanic cities, and religious centers like the Basilica of Esquipulas in Esquipulas, as well as the beaches on the Pacific and Atlantic coasts of Guatemala. Other tourist destinations are national parks and other protected areas such as the Maya Biosphere Reserve.

Some tourist destinations in Guatemala

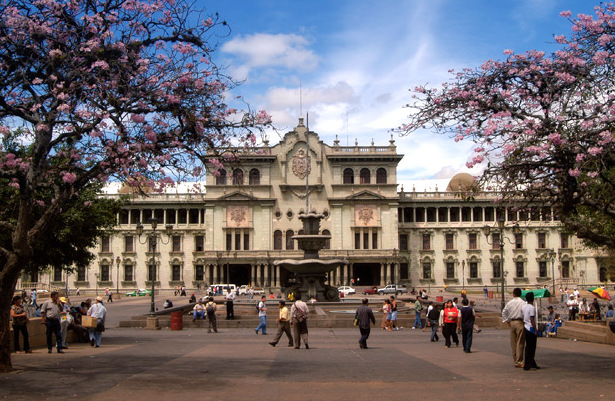
Guatemala City
Guatemala

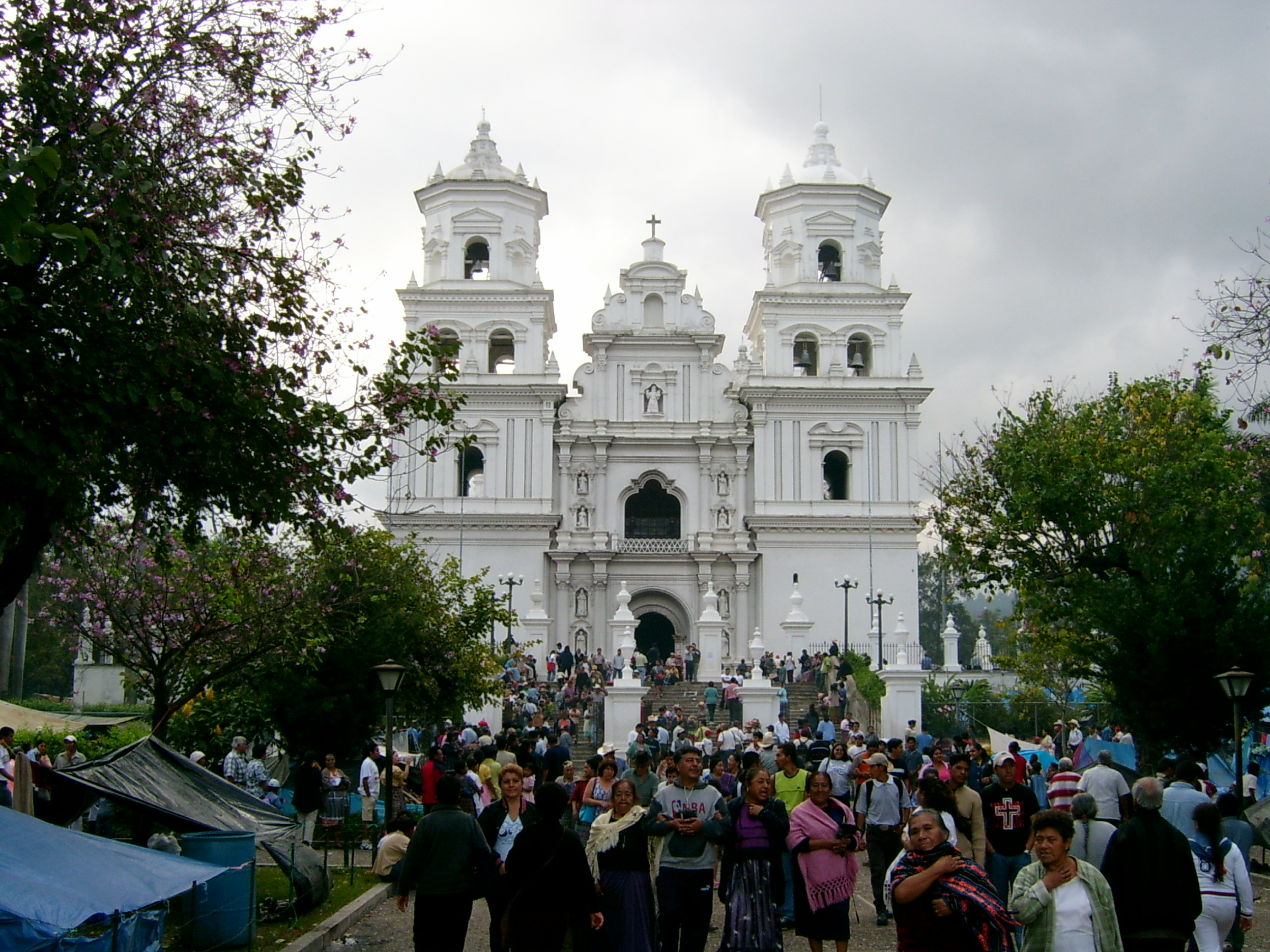
Basilica of Esquipulas
Esquipulas

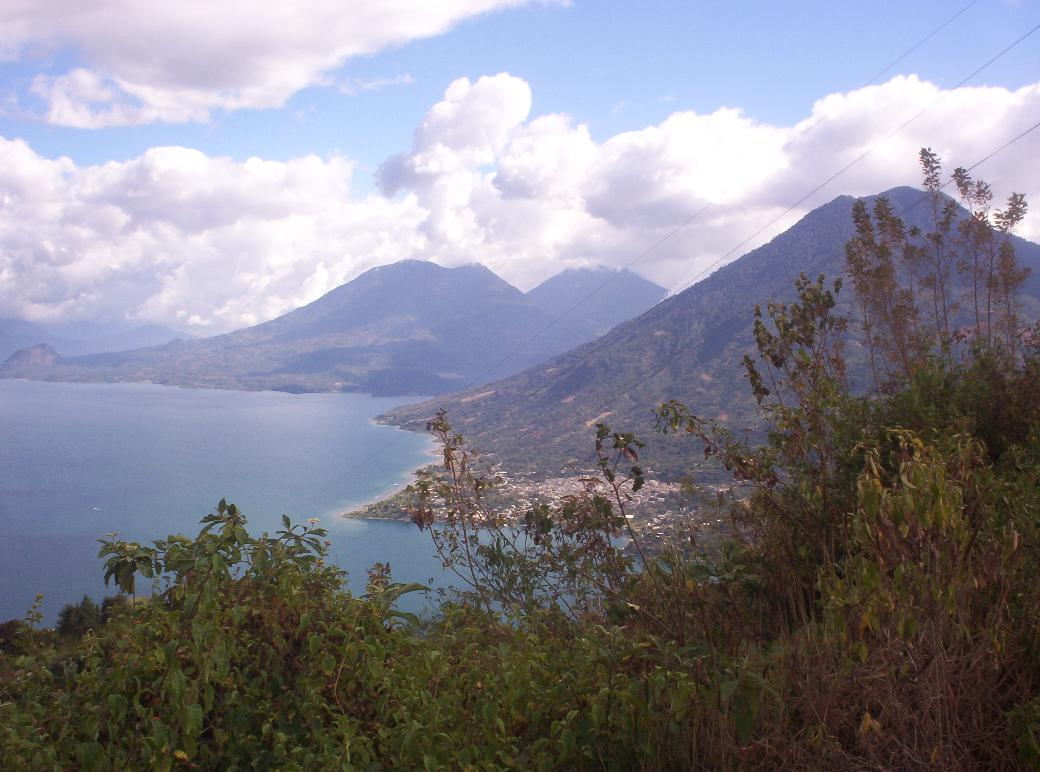
Lake Atitlán
Sololá

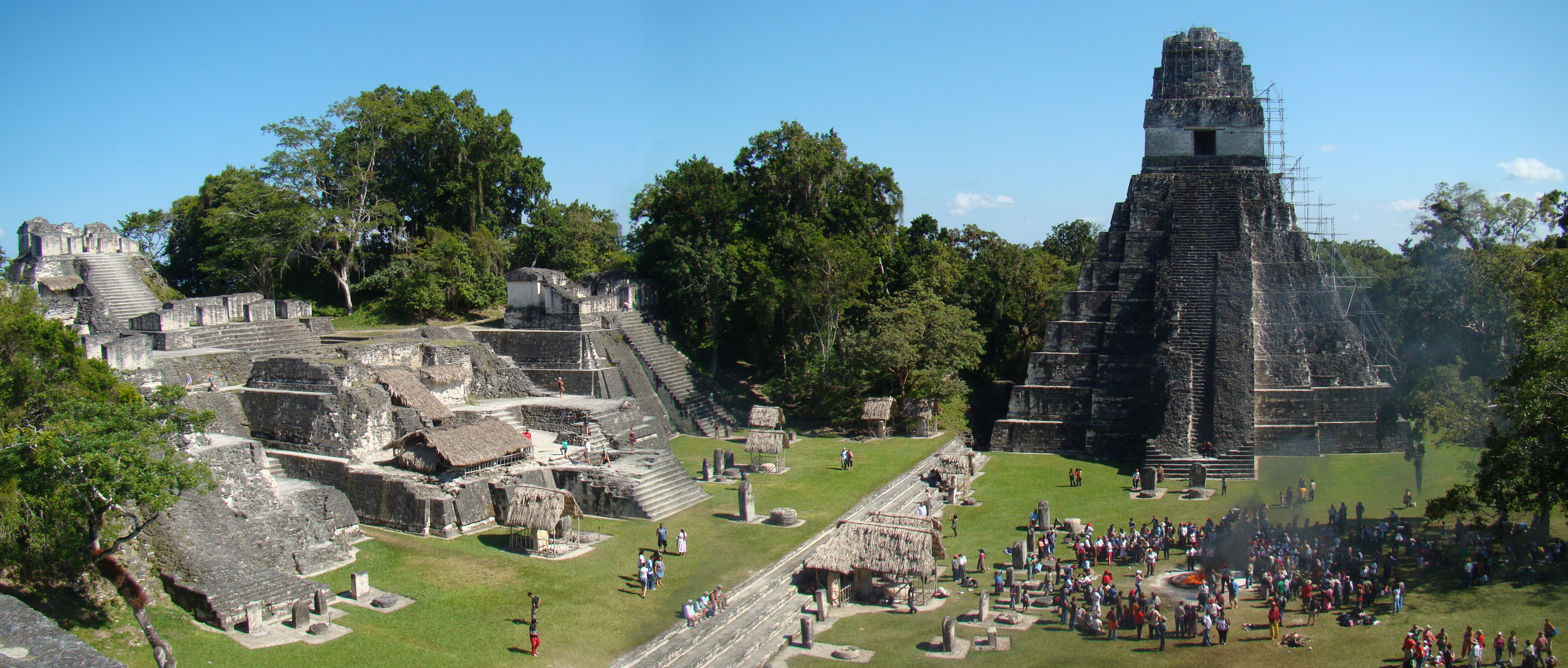
Tikal
Petén

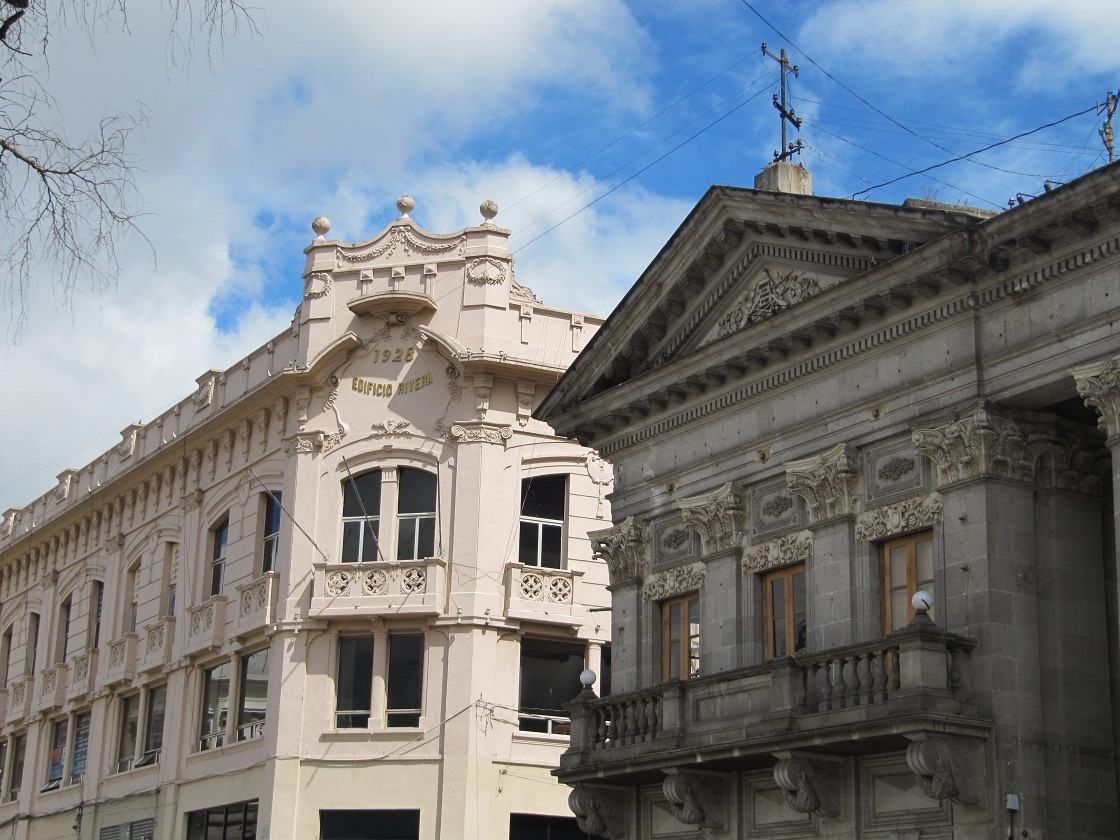
Quetzaltenango
Quetzaltenango

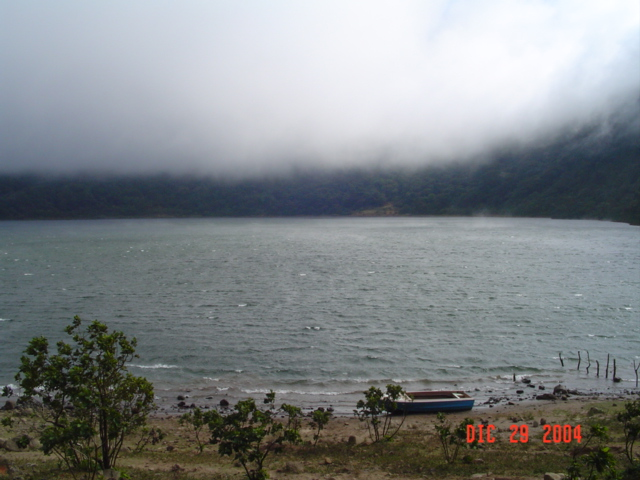
Ipala Volcano
Chiquimula

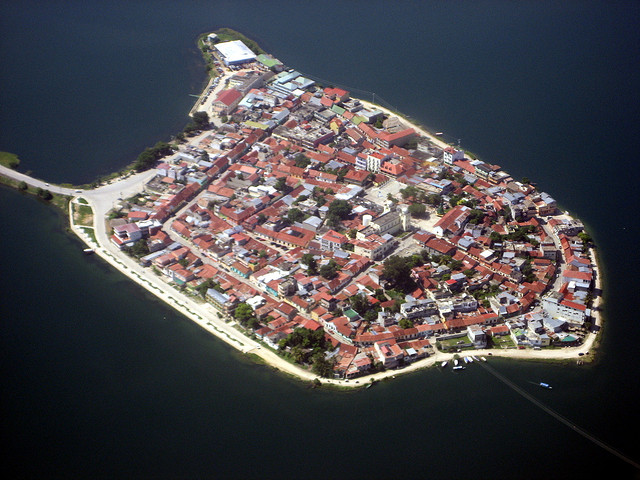
Flores
Petén

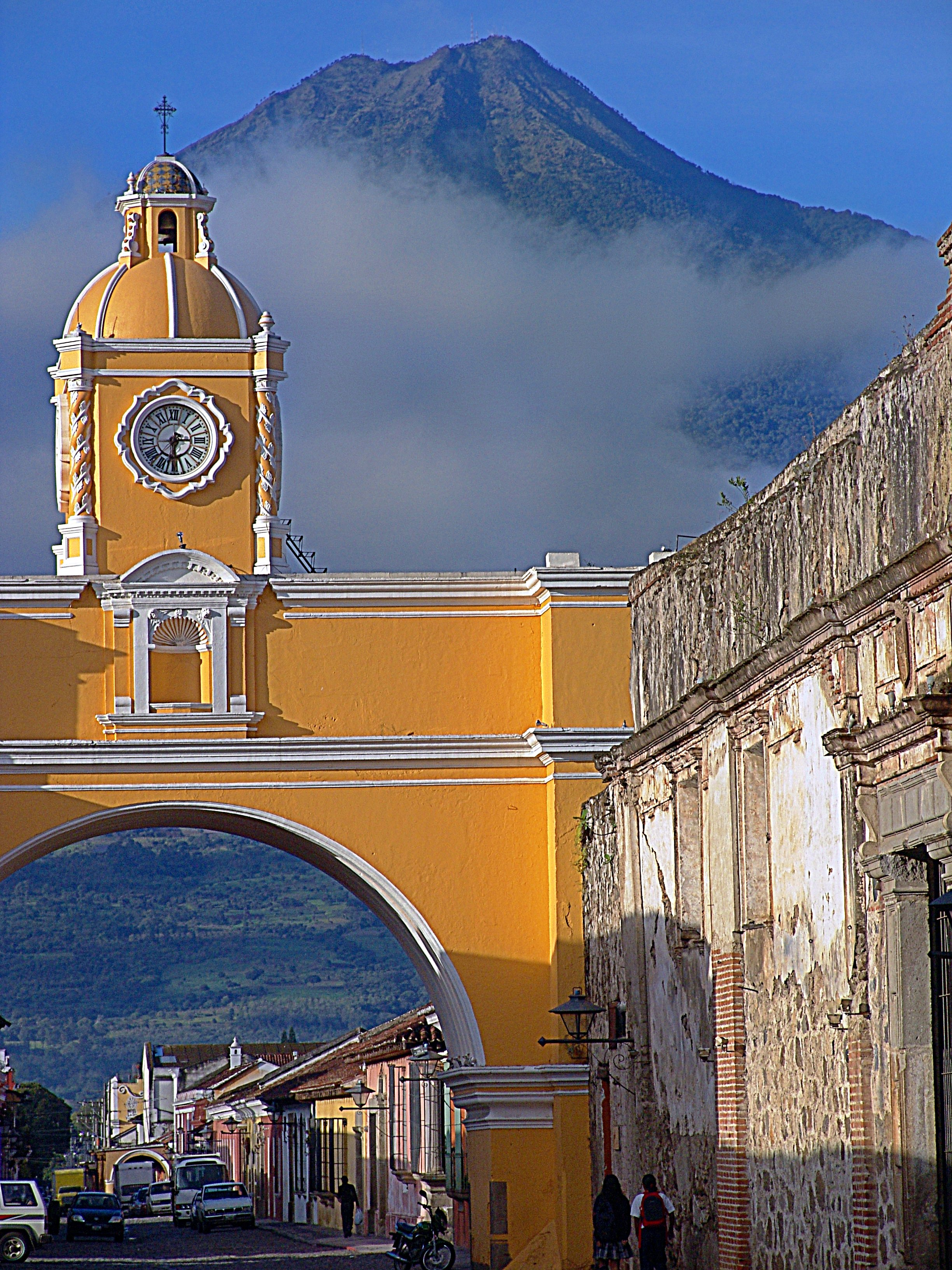
Antigua Guatemala
Sacatepequez

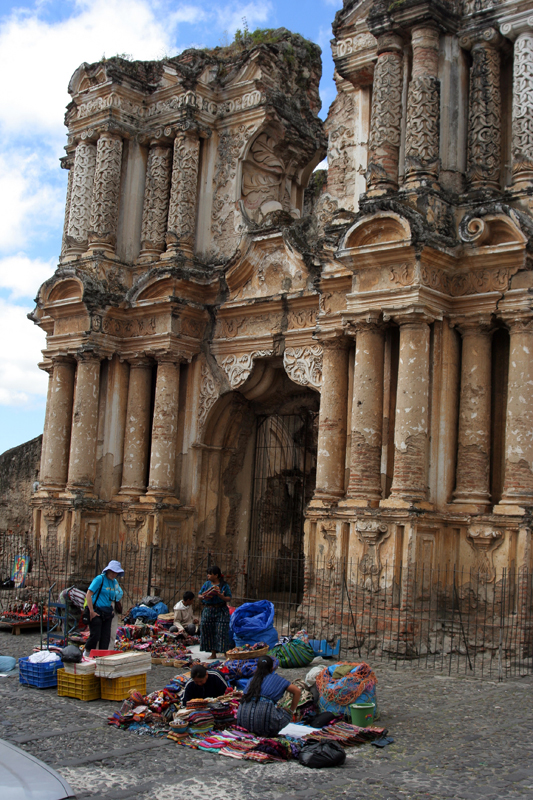
Antigua Guatemala
Sacatepequez

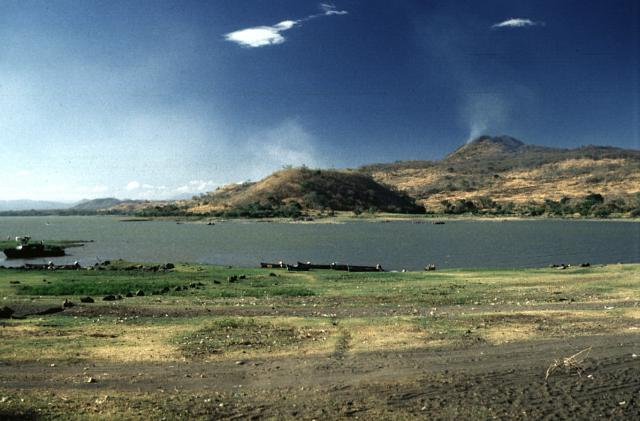
Lake Güija
Jutiapa

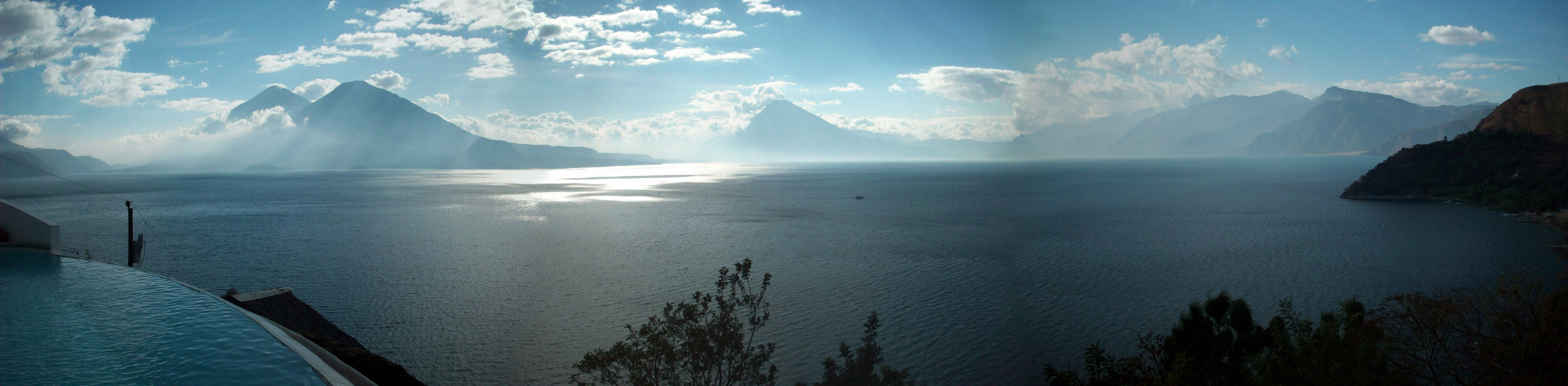
Lake Atitlán
Sololá

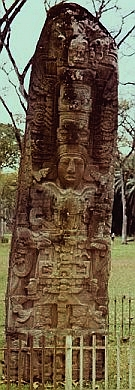
Stela D North, Quiriguá
Izabal

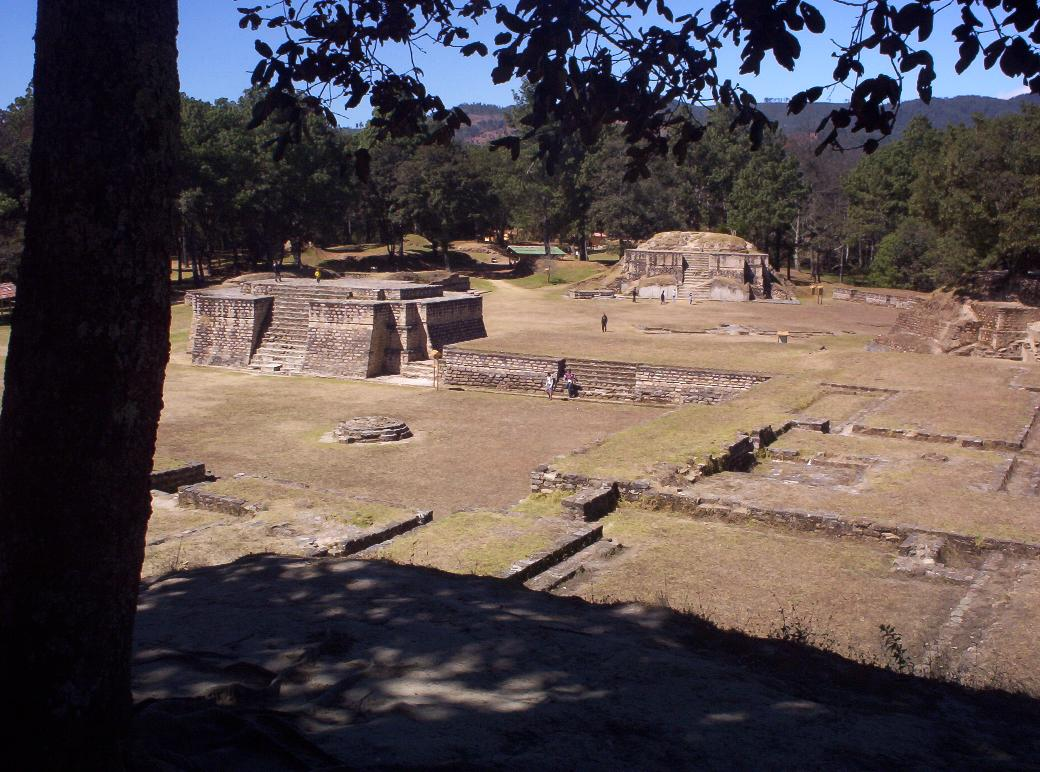
Iximche
Chimaltenango

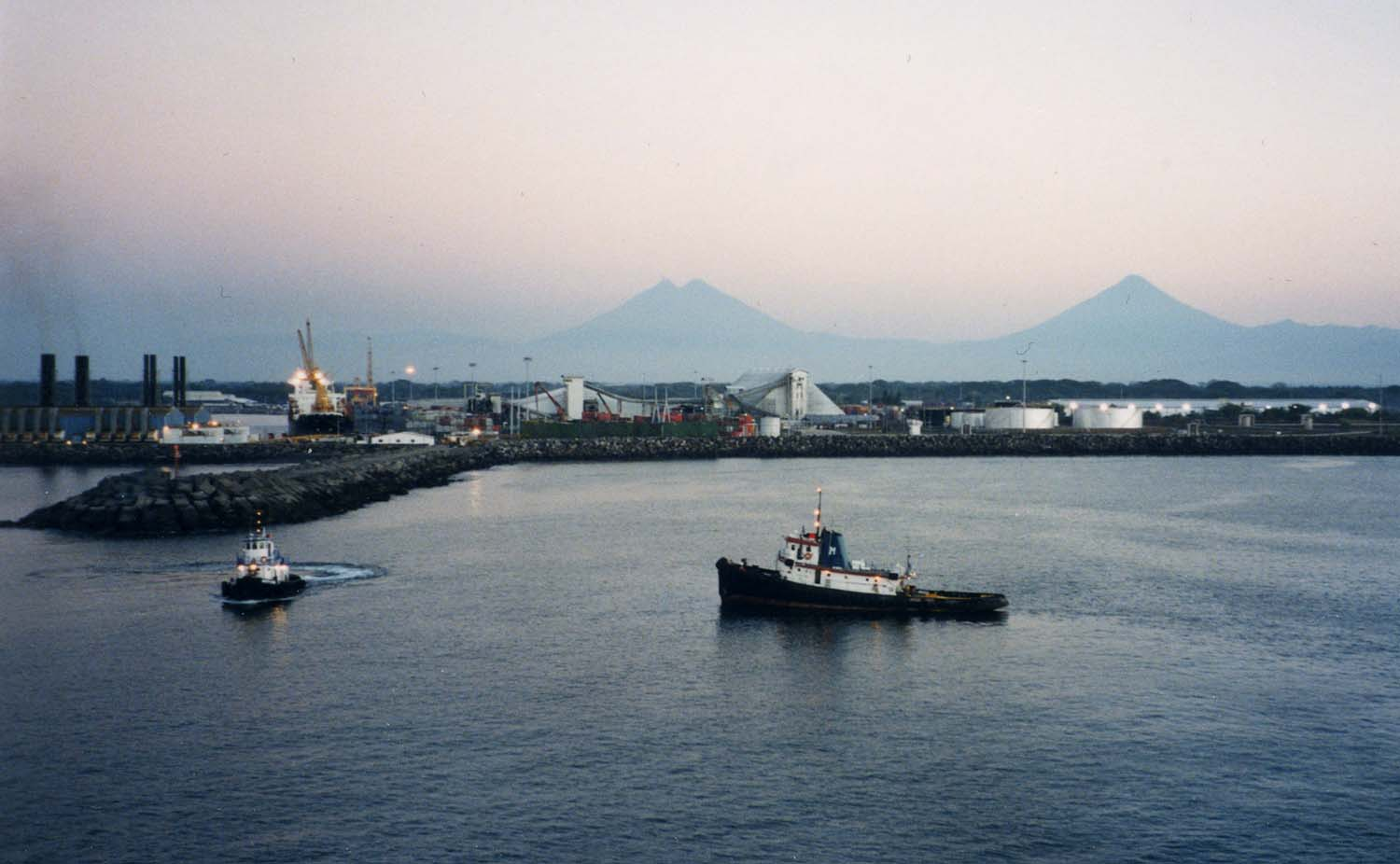
Puerto Quetzal
Escuintla

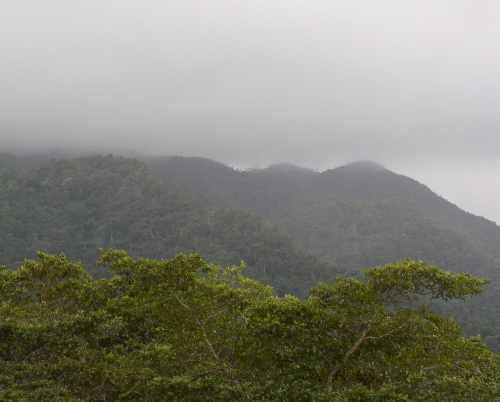
Maya Mountains
Peten Department

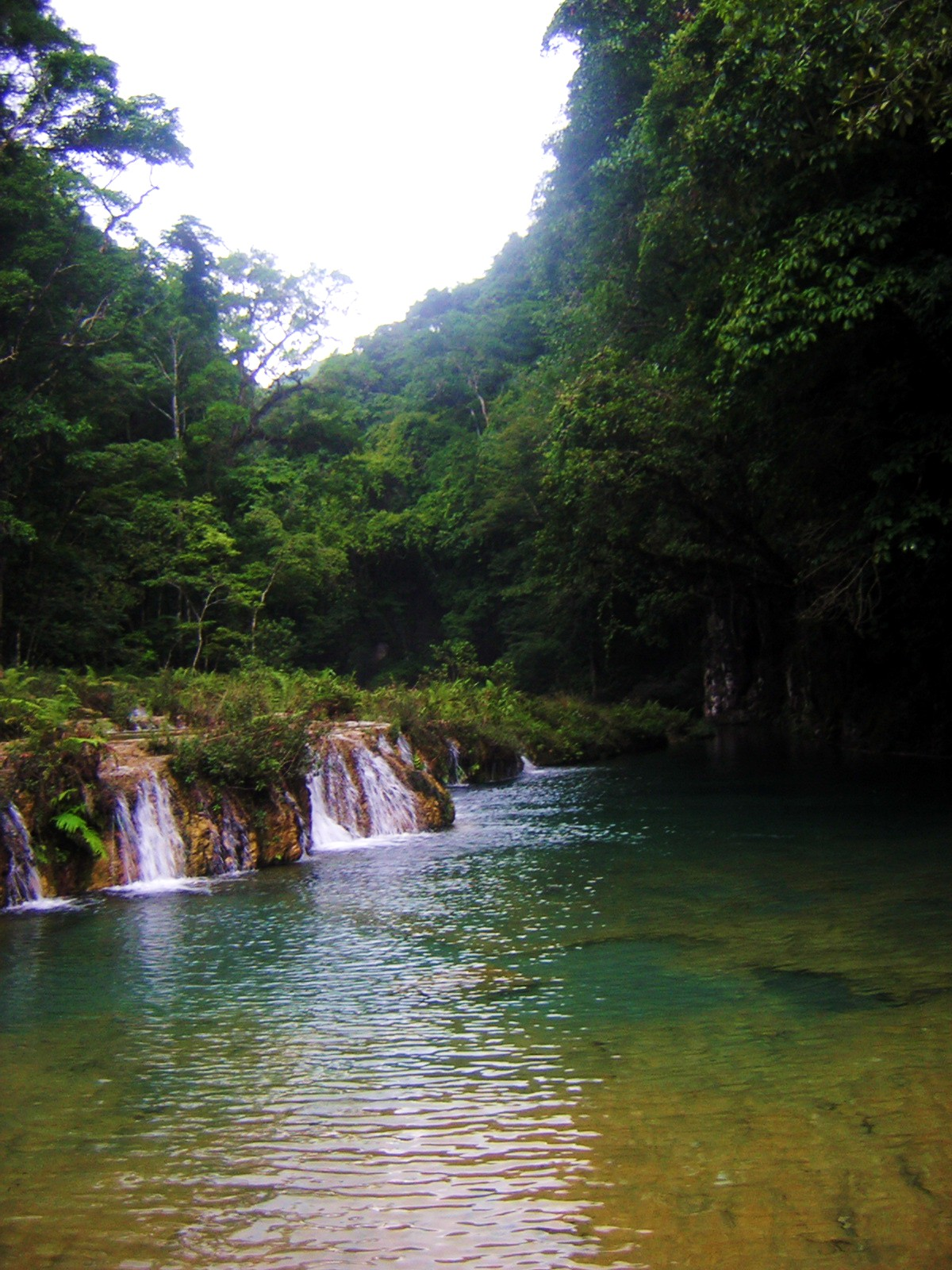
Semuc Champey
Alta Verapaz

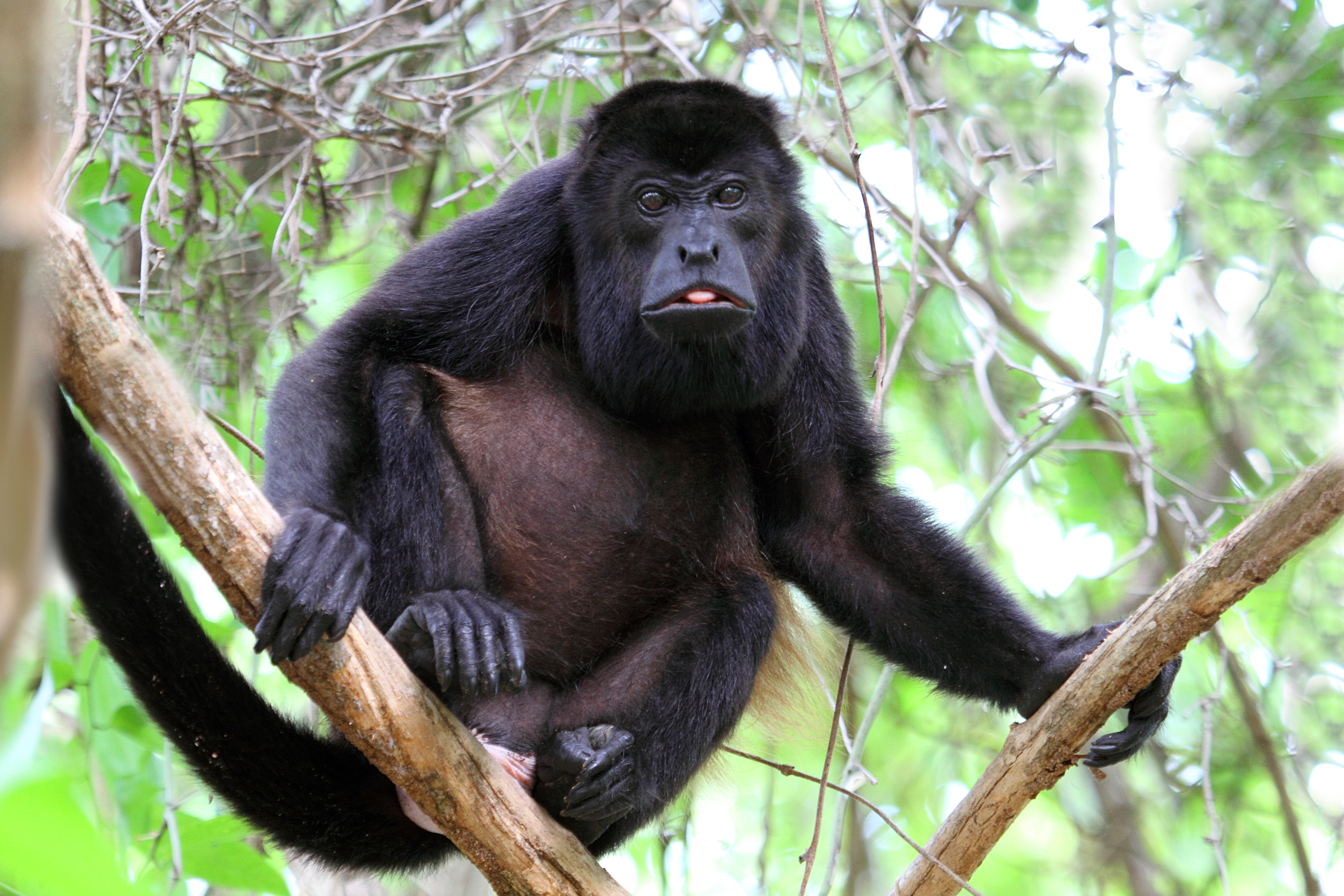
Mantled howler
native of Guatemala

Regarding the Intangible Cultural Heritage, Guatemala has several protected declarations by the State, among which include the Huelga de Dolores from the University of San Carlos of Guatemala, according to Ministerial Agreement 275-2010, the Treat of December 8 of municipality of Chichicastenango, according 347-2010 Agreement and the Cofradía de San Marcos Evangelista, under Ministerial Agreement 532-2010.

The diversification of Guatemala's tourism portfolio is structured across key specialized segments that leverage its cultural, geographical, and ecological resources:

Key Tourism Segments and Infrastructure Frameworks in Guatemala
Tourism Segment	Primary Destinations & Corridors	Key Infrastructure & Activities	Sustainable & Cultural Impact
Cultural & Heritage Tourism	Antigua Guatemala, Chichicastenango, Lake Atitlán	Colonial architecture, living Maya traditions, indigenous markets, Holy Week processions	Direct support to local artisan cooperatives and community-led living heritage programs.
Archaeological Tourism	Tikal, El Mirador, Quiriguá, Iximche	Ancient Maya monuments, guided park circuits, site museums, canopy trails	Sustainable management within the Maya Biosphere Reserve and protected heritage corridors.
Ecotourism & Avitourism	Alta Verapaz, Sierra de las Minas, Atitlán Volcano	Birdwatching routes (>720 species), habitat conservation, canopy tours, hiking	Protection of native ecosystems and support for community-based forest rangers.
Meetings & Conventions (MICE)	Guatemala City, Antigua Guatemala	International convention centers, 4- and 5-star hotel infrastructure, business travel networks	Economic diversification and high-value international business trade connections.

=== Monuments ===
- City council of Antigua Guatemala
- Cathedral of Santiago (Parish of San José)
- Capuchins
- Jesuit
- Convent of La Concepción
- Santo Domingo Monastery
- Church School of Christ
- La Merced
- La Recolección
- Nuestra Señora del Carmen
- Palace of the Captain Generals
- Real and Pontifical University of San Carlos of Guatemala
- San Francisco
- Santa Catalina Virgin and Martyr

== Statistics ==
Tourist arrivals of 2024 in %

The following table shows the number of international visitors to Guatemala by country.

Rank	Country	2018	2025
1	El Salvador	1,060,962	1,539,421
2	United States	535,098	670,103
3	Honduras	133,356	264,590
4	Costa Rica; Nicaragua; Panama	135,521	191,721
5	Europe	173,045	185,161
6	South America	88,047	132,932
7	Mexico	104,710	118,652
8	Belize	58,369	87,549
9	Canada	55,485	41,447
10	Other	182,042	130,268
Total		2,405,902	3,361,843

== See also ==
- Pueblos Pintorescos (Guatemala)
- List of museums in Guatemala
- Mesoamerican Barrier Reef System
