= Laguna del Tigre =

National park in Petén, Guatemala

Laguna del Tigre National Park
- Interactive map of Laguna del Tigre National Park
- Location: Petén Department, Guatemala
- Coordinates: 17°29′30″N 90°30′0″W
- Area: 3,378.99 km^{2} (1,304.64 sq mi)
- Established: Acuerdo Gubernativo
- Operator: CONAP

Laguna del Tigre National Park is located in northern Guatemala, in the municipality of San Andrés, Petén Department. Covering an area of 337,899 ha, makes it the largest core zone of the Maya Biosphere Reserve (MBR) and the largest national park in Guatemala and the largest protected wetlands in Central America.

It also has the status of Ramsar site because of its size, wealth and characteristics of its wetland ecosystem. The vast area periodically floods, creating unique characteristics such as vast savannas and transition forests. It is also included in the convention's Montreux Register of threatened wetland sites. This biodiverse area features consisting of floodable savannas and wetlands; transition forest (which covers most of the park); high forest; and flora.

== Threats ==
Analysis of aerial images in 2020, found evidence of large-scale cattle ranching in 87% of the images. Large ranches were encouraged by the government in the 1960s, and from circa 2002, narcos laundered cash by buying land and cattle, and selling the meat for money that cannot be traced to drug activity. Campesinos (small-scale farmers) have smaller plots and tend to grow food crops as well as pasture, whereas drug traffickers clear dozens of hectares which are rectangular, have long straight lines and tractor tyre marks may be seen.
