= Universidad del Valle de Guatemala =

Private university in Guatemala City, Guatemala

Coordinates: 14.605°N 90.490°W

University of the Valley of Guatemala
- Universidad del Valle de Guatemala
- Motto: Excelencia que trasciende ('Excellence that transcends')
- Type: Private university
- Established: 1966
- Rector: Roberto Moreno Godoy
- Students: 3,000
- Location: Guatemala City, Guatemala
- Website: www.uvg.edu.gt

The Universidad del Valle de Guatemala (UVG) (University of the Valley of Guatemala) is a private, not-for-profit, secular university in Guatemala City, Guatemala. It was founded in 1966 by a private foundation, which had previously overseen the American School of Guatemala. It was the first private university to give a strong emphasis to technology and technical background in the country. UVG holds the registry for the .gt country-code domain name.

== Faculties ==
The university has eight faculties:

- Engineering
- Education
- Social Studies
- Science and Humanities
- Design Innovation and Arts
- Global Management and Business Intelligence
- Colegio Universitario
- Architecture

== Associations and clubs ==
UVG has clubs and associations, which promote student participation.

Each career may have its own association. Currently, the university has 15 associations:

- Asociación de Estudiantes de Física
- Asociación de Estudiantes de Biología
- Asociación de Estudiantes de Ciencias Sociales y Ecoturismo
- Asociación de Estudiantes de Ingeniería Civil
- Asociación de Estudiantes de Ingeniería en Alimentos
- Asociación de Estudiantes de Ingeniería Ciencias de la Computación
- Asociación de Estudiantes de Ingeniería Industrial
- Asociación de Estudiantes de Ingeniería Mecánica
- Asociación de Estudiantes de Química Farmacéutica
- Asociación de Estudiantes de Nutrición
- Asociación de Estudiantes de Psicología
- Asociación de Estudiantes de Educación
- Asociación de Estudiantes de Bioquímica y Microbiología
- Asociación de Estudiantes de Ingeniería Electrónica
- Asociación de Estudiantes de Ingeniería Mecatrónica
- Asociación de Estudiantes de Ingeniería Química
- Asociación de Estudiantes de Facultad de Ingeniería
- Asociación de Estudiantes de Facultad de Ciencias Humanas
- Asociación de Estudiantes de Facultad de Ciencias Sociales

The school has clubs for interested students.

- Art Club
- Music Club
- Theater Club
- Volleyball Club
- Chess Club
- Lecture Club
- and others

== See also ==
- List of universities in Guatemala
