= International rankings of Guatemala =

These are the international rankings of Guatemala

== International rankings ==
Organization Hi	Survey	Ranking
Institute for Economics and Peace	Global Peace Index	111 out of 144
United Nations Development Programme	Human Development Index	122 out of 182
Transparency International	Corruption Perceptions Index	108 out of 180
World Economic Forum	Global Competitiveness Report	80 out of 133
New Economics Foundation	Happy Planet Index	4 out of 143
World Intellectual Property Organization	Global Innovation Index, 2026	120 out of 130
