= Riscos de Momostenango =

National park in Totonicapán, Guatemala

Riscos de Momostenango National Park
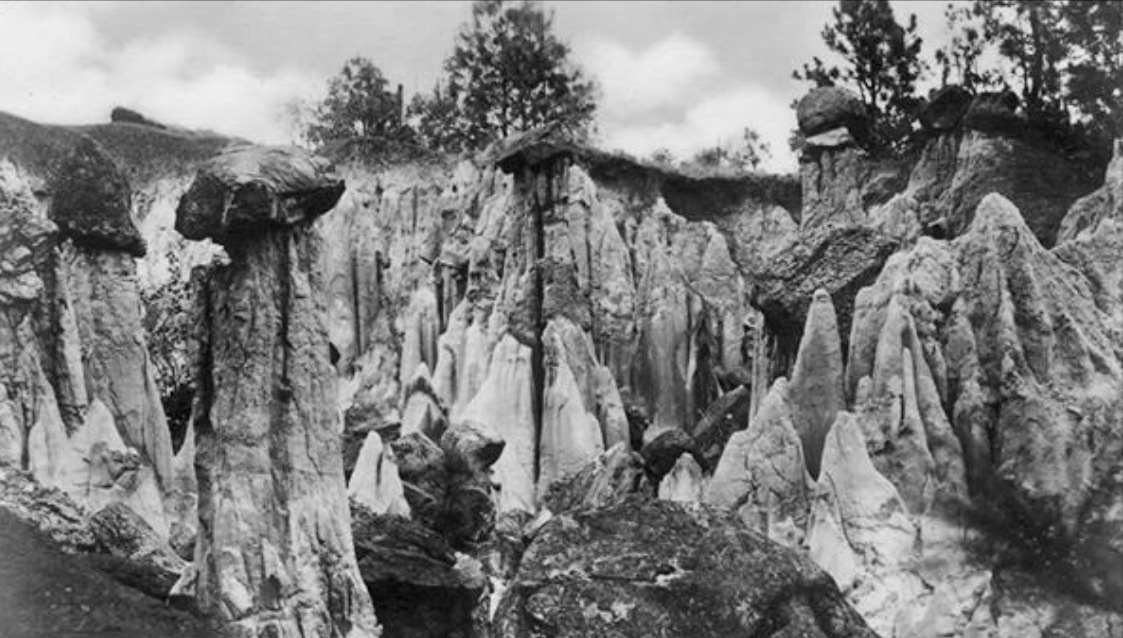
- Interactive map of Riscos de Momostenango; National Park
- Location: Totonicapán, Guatemala
- Coordinates: 15°02′39″N 91°24′33″W
- Area: 2.40 km^{2} (0.93 sq mi)
- Elevation: 2,200 m (7,200 ft)
- Established: Acuerdo Gubernativo 26-05-55
- Operator: CONAP

Riscos de Momostenango is an area of curiously shaped sandstone formations located in the municipality of Momostenango in Guatemala.

An area of 2.4 km2, including the sandstone formations and the surrounding forests, was declared a national park in 1955.
