= Montañas Mayas Chiquibul =

Biosphere reserve in Guatemala

Montañas Mayas Chiquibul biosphere reserve
- Interactive map of Montañas Mayas Chiquibul biosphere reserve
- Location: El Petén, Guatemala
- Coordinates: 16.527°N 89.22°W
- Area: 1,235.99 km^{2} (477.22 sq mi)
- Established: Decreto Legislativo 64–95
- Operator: CONAP

Montañas Mayas Chiquibul is a biosphere reserve in the north of Guatemala. It is located in the municipalities of San Luis, Poptún, Dolores, and Melchor de Mencos in the department of El Petén, and covers an area of 1,236 km^{2} (477 mi^{2}).
