= Los Aposentos =

National park in Chimaltenango, Guatemala

Los Aposentos National Park
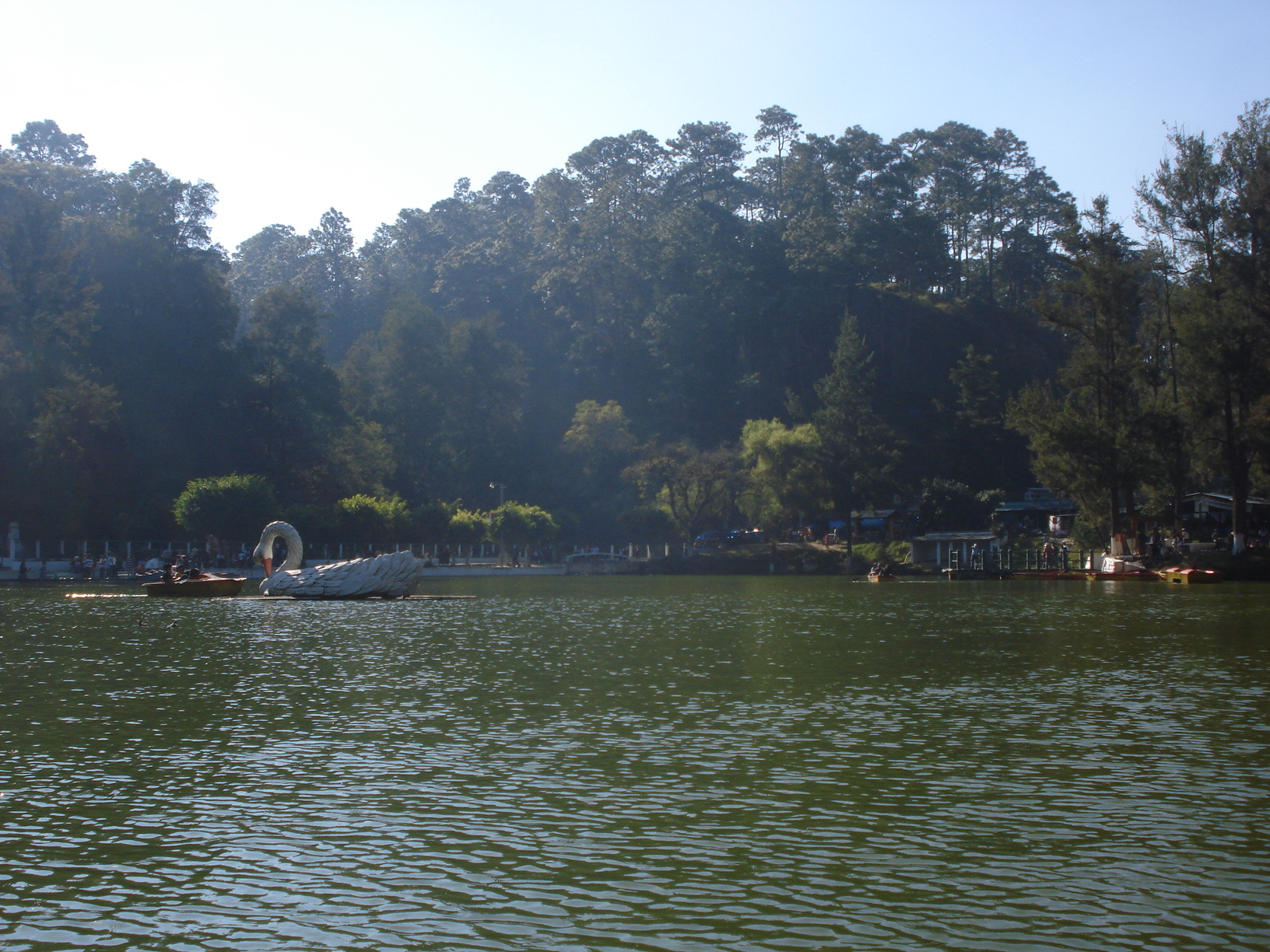
- Small lake in the park.
- Interactive map of Los Aposentos; National Park
- Location: Chimaltenango (department), Guatemala
- Coordinates: 14°38′08″N 90°48′56″W
- Area: 0.15 km^{2} (0.058 sq mi)
- Elevation: 1,750 m (5,740 ft)
- Established: Acuerdo Gubernativo 26-05-55
- Operator: CONAP

Los Aposentos is a small forested park area with a number of springs and two small lakes. It is located a few kilometers south of the city of Chimaltenango in Guatemala. It was formerly known as "Finca la Alameda" and renamed to Los Aposentos in 1929.

An area of 0.15 km^{2}, including the lakes was declared a national park in 1955.
