= .gt =

Internet country code top-level domain for Guatemala

- Introduced: 14 August 1992
- TLD type: Country code top-level domain
- Status: Active
- Registry: Universidad del Valle de Guatemala
- Sponsor: Universidad del Valle de Guatemala
- Intended use: Entities connected with Guatemala
- Actual use: Popular in Guatemala
- Registered domains: 23,327 (2022-12-16)
- Registration restrictions: Some second-level names are restricted to particular types of entities
- Structure: Registrations are now available at both second level and at third level beneath various second-level names
- Documents: Policies
- Dispute policies: UDRP
- Registry website: GT Domain Registry

.gt is the Internet country code top-level domain (ccTLD) for Guatemala. Registrations are taken directly at the second level under .gt, as well as third level under some second level labels.

== Second level domains ==
- .com.gt: Commercial entities
- .edu.gt: Educational institutions
- .net.gt: Networks; unrestricted in registration
- .gob.gt: Guatemalan governmental entities
- .org.gt: Organizations; unrestricted in registration
- .mil.gt: Guatemalan military entities
- .ind.gt: Individuals

== See also ==
- Internet in Guatemala
