= Maya Biosphere Reserve =

Biosphere reserve in Petén Department, Guatemala

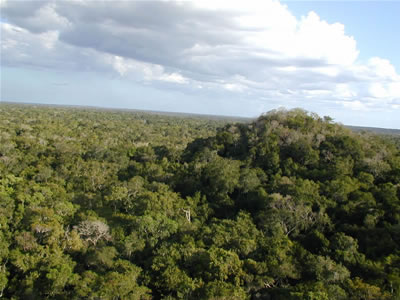
- Dense tropical rain forest in El Mirador, Guatemala. The hill in the foreground is the El Tigre pyramid, hidden by vegetation.

- Location within Guatemala
- Location: El Petén, Guatemala
- Coordinates: 17°25′48″N 90°53′26″W
- Area: 21,602.04 km^{2} (8,340.59 sq mi)
- Operator: CONAP

The Maya Biosphere Reserve (Spanish: Reserva de la Biosfera Maya) is a nature reserve in Guatemala managed by Guatemala's National Council of Protected Areas (CONAP). The Maya Biosphere Reserve covers an area of 21,602 km^{2}, one-fifth of the country's total land area.

The park is home to a large number of species of fauna including Morelet's crocodile and the ocellated turkey. It is also rich in flora including breadnut, mahogany, Swietenia humilis, Bloma prisca, Vitex gaumeri, cedar, Bucida buceras, Haematoxylum campechianum, Rhizophora mangle, and Pimenta dioica. The area ranges from wetlands, to low mountain ranges, and has several bodies of water, including lakes, rivers, streams and cenotes.

The Reserve was created in 1990 to protect the largest area of American tropical forest remaining north of the Amazon. The biosphere reserve model, implemented by UNESCO, seeks to promote a balance between human activities and the biosphere by including sustainable economic development in conservation planning.

== Human activity ==
The Maya Biosphere Reserve is divided into several zones, each with a different protected status. The core zones are formed by several national parks and biotopes (wildlife preserves), in which no human settlement, logging, or extraction of resources are allowed. These include Laguna del Tigre National Park, Sierra del Lacandón National Park, Mirador-Río Azul National Park, Tikal National Park, El Zotz Biotope, Naachtún-Dos Lagunas Biotope, Cerro Cahuí Biotope, Laguna del Tigre Biotope, and El Pilar Natural Monument. The core zones cover an area of 7670 km^{2}, which is 36% of the Maya Biosphere Reserve.

In multiple-use zones (8484.40 km^{2}; 40%) and the buffer zone (4975 km^{2}; 24%), which comprises the southern portion of the Reserve, certain regulated economic activities are allowed. These include the sustainable harvesting of wood and traditional forest products which include chicle, a sap used in the manufacture of chewing gum, xate, an ornamental palm plant used in floral arrangements, and pimenta or allspice. The Guatemalan government has granted forest concessions to local communities, giving them the right to practice sustainable forestry in delineated areas for 25 years. International monitoring groups such as the Forest Stewardship Council certify logging activities as sustainable. In 2005, 4,500 km^{2} (1,700 sq mi) were certified. In other parts of the multiple-use zone, farming communities have been granted the right to continue farming in so-called agricultural polygons.

== Archaeology ==
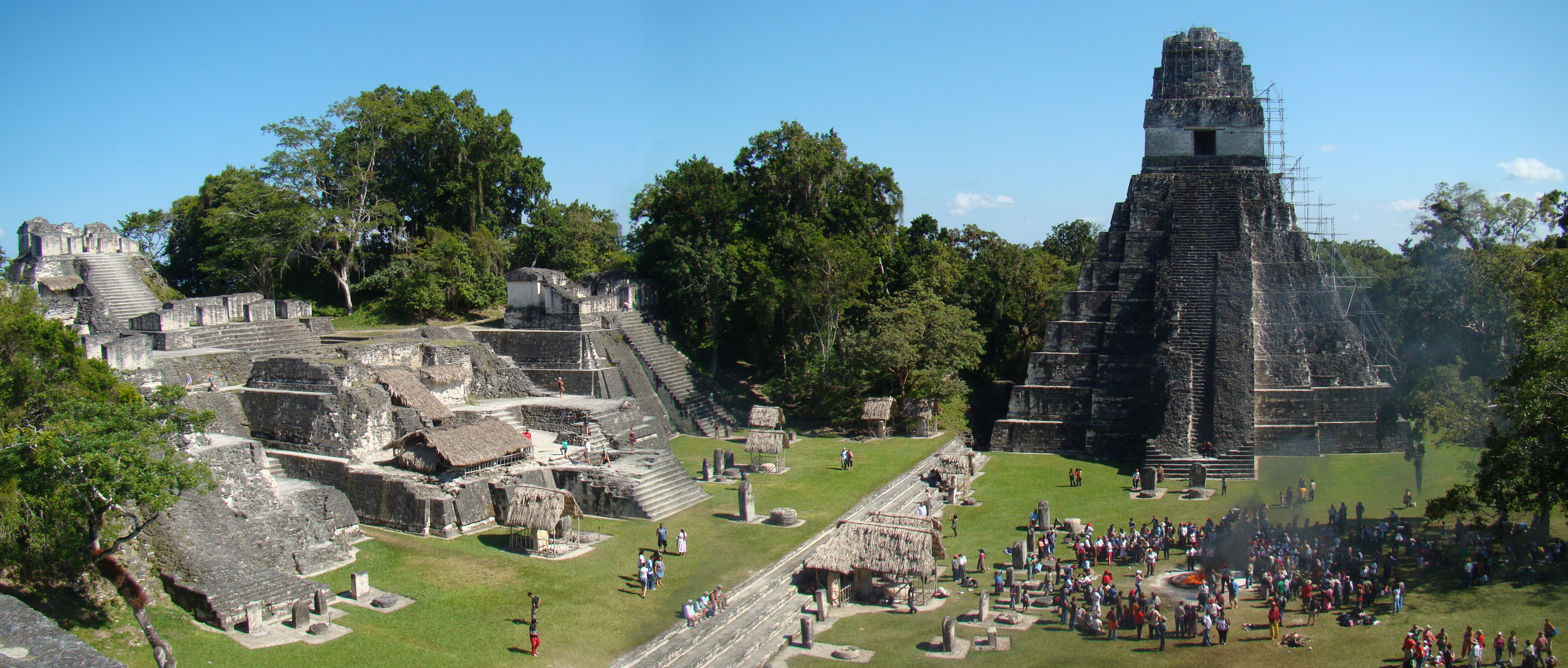
The Tikal plaza in December 2010

The Maya Biosphere Reserve is home to a large concentration of ancient Maya cities, many of which are under excavation. Tikal is the most famous of these, attracting about 120,000 to 180,000 visitors per year.

The Mirador Basin, in the northern part of the Reserve, contains numerous interconnected Maya cities. The project is directed by Richard Hansen, an archaeologist at El Mirador, the largest of the sites, dating from the preclassic Maya period. Other cities in the region include El Tintal, Nakbe, and Wakna.

In 2018, 60.000 uncharted structures were revealed by archaeologists with the help of the revolutionary technology lasers called 'lidar' in northern Guatemala. The project was mapped near the Maya Biosphere Reserve. Unlike previous assumptions, thanks to the new findings, archaeologists believe that 7-11 million Maya people inhabited the Petén Basin during the late classical period from 650 to 800 A.D. Lidar technology digitally removed the tree canopy to reveal ancient remains and showed that Maya cities like Tikal were bigger than previously thought. Houses, palaces, elevated highways, and defensive fortifications were unearthed because of the lidar. According to the archaeologist Stephen Houston, it is overwhelming finding in over 150 years of Maya archaeology.

== Environmental threats ==
Ecosystems in Maya Biosphere Reserve face numerous threats from human activities, including illegal logging, farming, and ranching in protected areas, as well as drug trafficking, poaching, and looting of Maya artifacts. The forest area of the Reserve has shrunk by 13 percent over the last 21 years according to the non-profit organization Rainforest Alliance, which has several community development projects in the region. Since 2000, illegal cattle ranches have cleared about 8 percent of the reserve. Some of the most extreme deforestation has occurred in the Laguna del Tigre and Sierra del Lancandon National Parks. In Laguna del Tigre National Park analysis of aerial images in 2020, found evidence of large-scale cattle ranching in 87% of the images. Large ranches were encouraged by the government in the 1960s and from circa 2002 narcos, laundered cash by buying land and cattle and selling the meat for money that cannot be traced to drug activity. Campesinos (small-scale farmers) have smaller plots and tend to grow food crops as well as pasture, whereas drug traffickers clear dozens of hectares which are rectangular, have long straight lines and tractor tyre marks may be seen.
