= Telecommunications in Guatemala =

Telecommunications in Guatemala include radio, television, fixed and mobile telephones, and the Internet.

== Radio and television ==
- Radio stations: 1 government-owned radio station and hundreds of privately owned radio stations (2007).
- Radios: 835,000 (1997).
- Television stations: 4 privately owned national terrestrial channels dominate TV broadcasting; multi-channel satellite and cable services are available (2007).
- Television sets: 640,000 (1997).

== Telephones ==
Guatemala's incumbent telephone company is TELGUA, which won the bidding for the privatization of the government run GUATEL.

- Calling code: +502
- International call prefix: 00
- Main lines in use:
  - 665,061 lines (2000)
  - 1.4 million lines (2006)
  - 1.7 million lines, 63rd in the world (2012)
- Mobile cellular:
  - 663,296 lines (2000)
  - 6.8 million lines (2006)
  - 10.2 million lines, 70% of the population (2007)
  - 20.8 million lines, 46th in the world (2012)
- Telephone system: fairly modern network centered in Guatemala City; connected to Central American Microwave System, a trunk microwave radio relay system that links the countries of Central America and Mexico with each other.
- Satellite earth stations: 1 Intelsat (Atlantic Ocean).
- Communications cables: landing point for both the Americas Region Caribbean Ring (ARCOS-1) and the SAm-1 fiber optic submarine cable systems that together provide connectivity to South and Central America, parts of the Caribbean, and the US (2011).
- Operators:

International Operator	Brand	Users	Technology	Web Site
América Móvil	Claro/PCS Digital	3,591,138 (June 2007)	CDMA 1x EVDO Rev 0 1900 MHz, GSM/GPRS/EDGE 900/1900 MHz, UMTS/HSPA 1900 MHz (1.5 Mbit/s) with video calling and data services available.	Claro Guatemala
Telefónica	Movistar	2,514,612 (June 2007)	CDMA 1x EVDO Rev A 1900 MHz and GSM/GPRS/EDGE 1900 MHz, UMTS/HSPA 1900 MHz (7.2 Mbit/s) with data services only available.	Movistar Guatemala
Millicom / Local partners	TIGO/COMCEL	3,116,998 (June 2007)	TDMA/N-AMPS (to be shut down) and GSM/GPRS/EDGE 850 MHz, UMTS/HSDPA 850 MHz (3.6 Mbit/s) with video calling and data services available	TIGO Guatemala
Digicel Group	Digicel must be launched before June 18, 2008		Planned GSM/GPRS/EDGE 900 MHz	Digicel Group

== Internet ==
- Top-level domain: .gt
- Internet users:

Year	Users
2002	~200,000
2003	~600,000
2004	~1.0 million
2005	~1.7 million
2006	~2.4 million
2007	~3.8 million
2009	~2.3 million, 72nd in the world
2012	~2.3 million, 86th in the world; 16.0% of the population, 153rd in the world
2021	~9.2 million

- Fixed broadband: unknown (2012).
- Mobile broadband: 632,624 subscriptions, 85th in the world; 4.5% of the population, 113th in the world (2012).
- Internet hosts: 357,552 hosts, 60th in the world (2012).
- IPv4: 552,192 addresses allocated, less than 0.05% of the world total, 39.2 addresses per 1000 people (2012).
- Internet service providers (ISPs): 27 (2004).

=== Internet censorship and surveillance ===
In 2011 the OpenNet Initiative reported no evidence of Internet filtering in Guatemala.

Guatemala's constitution protects freedom of speech, freedom of the press, and individual privacy, however, government officials routinely violate these rights. Recent constitutional reforms have legalized various electronic surveillance techniques that threaten online privacy.

- The Ley de Proteccion Integral de la Niñez y Adolescencia (Law on the Protection of Children and Adolescents) permits the restriction of content for children younger than eighteen years of age if it is deemed harmful to their development. Media outlets and organizers of public events are required to evaluate and classify programmed content according to this law.
- The Ley de Emisión del Pensamiento (Law on Expression of Thought) prohibits libel, slander, and treason in printed form, and stipulates that the author of any publication containing an opinion that the judiciary considers to be subversive, morally damaging, or "disrespectful" of private life may be subject to punishment. The Law on Expression of Thought explicitly requires newspapers that have incorrectly attributed acts to or published false information about people or entities to publish any corrections, explanations, or refutations sent to them by those they have accused. In cases of printed material that involves treason, is subversive, is "damaging to morals," or contains slander or libel, newspapers may be subject to a trial by jury; decisions may be appealed within 48 hours. The law makes an exception when the offended party is a government employee or official: if the offending content concerns "purely official acts" related to government work, the case will be judged in a "court of honor," and the decision will be final and closed to appeal.
- The Ley de Orden Público (Law of Public Order) states that if the government has declared the country to be "in a state of siege," journalists must "refrain from publishing anything that might cause confusion or panic."

== See also ==
- Media of Guatemala
