= Consejo Nacional de Areas Protegidas =

Consejo Nacional de Áreas Protegidas (CONAP)

Agency overview
- Formed: 1989
- Jurisdiction: Government of Guatemala
- Headquarters: 5a. Avenida 6-06, Zona 1, Edificio IPM 5to., 6to., 7mo. y 9no. nivel, Guatemala City
- Parent agency: President of Guatemala
- Website: www.conap.gob.gt

The National Council for Protected Areas (in Spanish: Consejo Nacional de Áreas Protegidas, CONAP) is the government agency of Guatemala that has as its mission the conservation and the sustainable use of the biological diversity and protected areas of Guatemala. CONAP was created by Decree 4-89, or the Law of Protected Areas (in Spanish: Ley de Areas Protegidas, LAP) gave jurisdiction to over the System of Protected Areas of Guatemala (in Spanish: Sistema Guatemalteco de Áreas Protegidas, SIGAP), which is the conglomeration of all protected areas, and those under special protection in the country.

== Background ==
Up until the 1950s, the northern Peten had been largely disconnected from the State despite being the largest department in the country. Economic activity was mostly restrained to ranching and the harvest of chicle and xate with almost complete absence of regulatory agencies. Ranchers and indigenous communities, like the Maya Q’echi that had migrated from the Alta Verapaz region in the 19th century, composed most of the scattered population in the region. However, after the coup of 1954 that ended the Arbenz administration, the region became the “escape valve to the agrarian problems of Guatemala” by becoming the source of land grants offered to the landless, indigenous and peasant populations disenfranchised by the overturning of the land reform. This was the onset of the colonization process that would later be formalized by the creation of a government agency with the mission to develop and integrate the Peten region with the rest of the country . In 1959, Congress created the National Enterprise for the Economic Development of Petén (Spanish: Empresa de Fomento y Desarrollo de Petén, FYDEP) through the passing of Decree 1286. According to Michael Painter, FYDEP had the following objectives: 1) To manage and build infrastructure to foment agricultural, industrial, and touristic development in Peten 2) To exploit the region's natural resources, except oil, for domestic and foreign markets 3) To sell land to landless countrymen for the production of basic grains and as a way to help reduce the political demands for land reform in the south 4) To place settlers in cooperatives along the western borders with Mexico to bar Mexican colonists from entering Peten and prevent Mexican construction of hydroelectric facilities near the border 5) To promote medium scale capitalized cattle ranching in central and south Peten.

The result was the expansion of agriculture, ranching, logging, extraction of forest products and the construction of unsophisticated infrastructure, schools and health facilities (Painter). Many of these activities grew with minimal oversight from the government and FYDEP. By 1990, satellite imagery showed that 40% of Peten had been deforested and another 10% degraded. Some attribute the neglect of sustainable development by the Guatemalan government to be a result of the close involvement of the military in State affairs, whose concerns in regards to the jungle were insurrections and lacked the know-how and interest in environmental protection. By 2000, FYDEP had estimated a population in Peten of about 50, 000; although, there were already 64,000 people living in the region by 1973. FYDEP was disintegrated by the government in 1986 due to criticisms of its inability to control both the process of colonization and the growth of illegal logging practices, albeit, the damage to the region had already been done with the agricultural frontier quickly growing deeper north into the forest.

== Organization ==
In 1989, Guatemala passed the Law of Protected Areas (LAP) in order to combat the rapid rate of deforestation around the country. LAP created the National Council for Protected Areas, whose legal function are stipulated by Decree 4-89 as the executive coordinator of conservation efforts. It meets every two weeks or at the discretion of the acting President, as directed by Article 67. The main objectives of CONAP are stated in Article 62:

1. To promote and foster conservation and the improvement of the natural heritage of Guatemala
2. To organize, direct, and develop the System of Protected Areas in Guatemala (SIGAP)
3. To plan, conduct, and enforce the National Strategy for Conservation of Biological Diversity and Renewable Natural Resources in Guatemala
4. To coordinate the administration of resources for flora and fauna and the biological diversity of the nation, through their respective executive entities
5. To plan and coordinate the application of regulations in regards to the conservation of biological diversity contained in international agreements ratified by Guatemala
6. To create a national fund for the conservation of nature, sustained by financial resources resulting from domestic and foreign collaboration.

CONAP has three governing entities:

1. The Presidency - Article 64 of Decree 4-98 states that the position will be carried out by the National Coordinator of the Environment (in Spanish: Coordinador Nacional del Medio Ambiente) but the responsibilities can be transferred to a Council member in the case of an emergency.
2. The Executive Secretary - Article 70 details the role to be that of a director of the administrative and technical operations of CONAP and SIGAP that include holding meetings, participation in meetings (without voting power), approval of the budget, oversight of all personnel, and administrative changes for the improvement of daily operations. As stated in Article 71, this position can only be held by someone born in Guatemala, in minimal possession of a graduate degree, with at least three years experience in Protected Areas Administration, in full ownership of their civil rights.
3. The Executive Sub-Secretary - Article 74 grants the Executive Secretary the power to appoint an Executive Sub-Secretary, who would have to meet the same requirements as the Executive Secretary, and be given specific functions at the time of appointment. In the case that the Executive Secretary is absent or unable to fulfill their responsibilities, the Sub-Secretary will take their place.

It shares jurisdiction over territory with some of the following government agencies, representatives of which also compose the membership of the Council:

1. Ministerio de Ambiente y Recursos Naturales, MARN
2. Centro de Estudios Conservacionistas, CECON/USAC
3. Instituto Nacional de Antropología e Historia, IDAEH
4. A delegate from the NGO's registered with CONAP that have a focus on natural resources and the environment.
5. La Asociación Nacional de Municipalidades, ANAM
6. Instituto Guatemalteco de Turismo, INGUAT
7. Ministerio de Agricultura, Ganaderia y Alimentacion, MAGA

On December 12, 1996, Decree 110-96 was passed and made slight modifications to details pertaining to the organization and responsibilities of CONAP.

== National System of Protected Areas in Guatemala (SIGAP) ==
SIGAP was created under Article 2 of Decree 4-89 with the intent to unify all protected areas in the country and their administrative entities to facilitate the “conservation, rehabilitation, improvement and protection of the country’s natural resources and its biological diversity.” It would be composed of all previously declared protected areas, areas declared as protected under Article 89, and areas of special protection listed by Article 90.

=== Protected Areas ===
LAP declared the following as protected areas:

1. Biotope Mario Dary Rivera for the preservation of the Quetzal, located in Purulha, Baja Verapaz
2. Biotope Cerro Cahui, located in the Department of Peten.
3. Biotope Chocon Machacas for the conservation of the Manatee, located the Department of Izabal
4. Biotope Laguna del Tigre - Rio Escondido, located in the northwest region of the Department of Peten
5. Biotopo el Zotz, San Miguel la Palotada, located in the northern region of the Department of Peten
6. Biotopo Naachtun Dos Lagunas, located in the northern region of the Department of Peten
7. Laguna Lachua National Park located in Alta Verapaz

LAP declared the following as special protection areas:

1. Yolnabaj, located in the Department of Huehetenango
2. Cuchumatanes, located in the Department of Huehuetenango and the Department of Quiche
3. El Caba, located in the Department of Quiche
4. Manchon-Huamuchai, located in the southern coast of the Department of Retalhuleu and the Department of San Marcos
5. Boca Costa of the volcanoes in the southwest region of the country
6. Sierra Aral, located in the Department of Izabal
7. Cerro San Gil Ecological Reserve, located in the Department of Izabal
8. Punta de Manabique, located in the northern region of the Department of Izabal
9. Sierra de Santa Cruz, located in the Department of Izabal
10. Montana Espiritu Santo, located in the western region of the Department of Izabal
11. Sierra Chinaja, located in the northern region of the Department of Alta Verapaz
12. El Pino de Poptun Ecological Reserve, located in the Department of Peten
13. Extension of the Yaxja-Yaloch National Park, located in the Department of Peten
14. Vida Silvestre Refuge and Altar de los Sacrificios Cultural Monument and Laguna Ixoche, located in the Department of Peten
15. Semuc-Champey National Monument, located in the Department of Alta Verapaz
16. Cumbre de Maria Tecun, located in the Department of Totonicapan
17. Ipala Volcano, located in the Department of Chiquimula
18. Fraternidad Biosphere Reserve, located in the Department of Chiquimula
19. Sarstun River, in the northern region of the Department of Izabal
20. Tecpan Mountains, located in the Department of Chimaltenango
21. Sabanas de San Francisco
22. The Ecological Reserves and National Monuments located in the volcanic cones of the country
23. Xacaxa, located in the Department of Chimaltenango
24. Cumbre Alta, located between the Department of Izabal and the Department of Zacapa
25. Chiquibul River, in the Department of Peten
26. Laguna Perdida, located in the Department of Peten
27. Laguna del Rio Salinas, located in the Department of Peten
28. Sabana del Sos Ecological Reserve, located in the Department of Peten
29. San Rafael Pixcaya Multiple Use Zone, located in the Department of Chimaltenango
30. Laguna de Guija, located in the Department of Jutiapa
31. San Isidro Cafetales, Cumbre de Chiramay, located in the Department of Chiquimula
32. Valle de la Arada, located in the Department of Chiquimula
33. Laguna de Ayarza, located in the Department of Santa Rosa
34. Laguna Chic-Choc, located in the Department of Alta Verapaz
35. Abaj-Takalic Archeological Site, located in the Department of Retalhuleu
36. Mirador Rio Azul National Park, located in the Department of Peten
37. Uaxactun-Carmelita Multiple Use Reserve, located in the Department of Peten
38. Other areas that act as biological connectors between these areas

Beyond the areas specified areas listed in Decree 4-89 (and updated by Decree 110-96), SIGAP consists in total of 152 protected areas within the country. Specific categories of protection include national parks, biotopes, biosphere reserves, areas with several uses, forest reserves, natural monuments, cultural monuments, scenic routes and trails, marine parks, regional parks, recreational parks, and private nature reserves

=== Maya Biosphere Reserve ===
(in Spanish: Reserva de la Biosfera Maya, RBM)

In 1990, the Maya Biosphere Reserve was created through Decree 5-90 setting apart 2,112,940 hectares of land in the northern Peten region for environmental protection under the jurisdiction of CONAP (Gomez and Mendez). The policies adopted for the coordination of the RBM are laid out through Annual Plans of Operations, Planes Operativos Anuales (POAs), Mater Plans and other documentation that is approved by CONAP. The RBM is not administered directly by CONAP, whose role is mostly as a coordinator, instead it delegates authority over to other entities with claims to the RBM, to non-governmental organizations, and concessions. Entities with claims to the RBM are those that have a specific stake in the area, such as IDAHE and CECON, or even those whose collaboration would be necessitated to achieve the preservation of biodiversity. Article 57 gives CONAP the ability to partner with NGO's as “representative and executive agents.” Historically, NGO's have made up for CONAP's lack of technical assistance and community development in the concession areas.

Decree 5-90 also established three different types of zones, each with its own laws and regulations, within the RBM. The three zones are:

1. Nucleus Zones (National Parks and Protected Biotopes: 767,000 hectares; 36% of RBM)
2. Multiple Use Zones (in Spanish: Zonas de Usos Multiple, MUZ) (848,440 hectares; 40% of RBM)
3. Buffer Zones (497,500 hectares; 24% of the RBM) (Plan Maestro)

As CIFOR's Occasional Paper #49 states,”Within this framework, CONAP's mandate was to halt illegal logging, the advancement of the agricultural cattle frontier, the sacking of archaeological site and illegal traffic in drugs, fauna, and migrant workers.

==== Multiple Use Zones ====
The MUZs were established as a way to meet the expectations and needs of both the private sector and the heterogeneous communities already existing within the bounds of the area when they were declared as protected. The different needs were met by dividing the MUZ into concessions that would be given to legally recognized entities that would determine the nature and extent of forest resource extraction within their respective area. Twenty-two concessions were given in total. The forest industries that were already present in northern Peten received two concessions. Six concessions were granted to communities located inside the MUZ, and another six were granted to bordering communities. The remaining eight smaller concessions (from 900 to 5,300 ha, in comparison to 4,800 to 72,500 ha) were given to cooperatives in the Buffer Zone along the Uxumacinta River.

== Community Forestry Concessions ==
Of the total 2,112,940 hectares that make up the RBM, 445,804 hectares are under the management of community concessions, or portions of protected forest within the Multiple Use Zone of the Maya Biosphere Reserve given to specific communities for their stewardship. Community concession were determined to be the optimal way to settle disputes of how the newly granted protected status of the land would affect interest groups already living in northern Peten. To qualify for a concession, communities needed to become legally recognized by the State and be sponsored by an NGO to ensure the concession would have the technical support and administrative assistance to make forest resource extraction sustainable. Once qualified, the recognized organization signs a contract with the Guatemalan government that lasts 25 years and allows the rational use of wood, the extraction on non-wood products, and development of tourism.

A major criticism of the concession scheme has been the blatant disregard for the social, political, and economic dynamics of the people living within each concession. Community cohesion was questionable in most cases as a direct result of how unrelated to one another the groups were that constituted the “communities.” Many of these peoples, alliances, and new settlers simply banded together in order to qualify for a concession; therefore, had different, if not opposing, views on how forest areas should be managed. For example, the “Peteneros,” or those that had moved to the region in the early 1920s and were regarded as the locals, relied primarily on the trade of chicle, xate, and mahogany and had been working the forest with no government interference and had developed illegal logging and migration networks with surrounding countries. Other groups came into the region starting in the 1950s as part of the peasant migration initiated by the state-sponsored colonization effort and became ranchers, farmers, artisans, loggers, etc., with the prospect of land linking them together. The Guatemalan government had also used the region as a way to appease the armed conflict by providing the land to displaced peasants, guerrilleros, and war refugees returning from Mexico that resulted from the signing of the 1996 Peace Accords. Overall, this showed the concession scheme to have been minimally planned with no consultation from the affected communities.

=== ACOFOP ===
In 1995, during the concession negotiations community members in areas that could potentially benefit from concessions organized in order to oppose the possibility of concessions to be given to the private sector. This group became the Consejo Consultivo de Comunidades Forestales de Petén (CONCOFOP). After becoming legally recognized, it became the Asociacion de Comunidades Forestales de Petén (ACOFOP). Its main objectives were to develop social and human capital within the communities and promote sustainable models for extraction. ACOFOP played a crucial role in helping the communities attain legal statuses as associations, civil societies or even cooperatives in order to be eligible for concessions. The approval several community concessions can be linked to ACOFOP's advocacy.

CIFOR indicates that by 2005, ACOFOP's membership of 22 communities and organizations represented 14,000 individuals in 30 communities and managed a total of 500,000 hectares, of which 70% has been certified by the Forest Stewardship Council.

=== FORESCOM ===
FORESCOM (Empresa Comunitaria de Servicios del Bosque) was established in 2003 as a private company from the same community organizations that together comprise ACOFOP. The origins of FORESCOM stem from the idea of reducing the costs of marketing, forest management, certification, infrastructure development and maintenance and other related expenses required for the operations of concessions by creating “blocks” of forest with neighboring communities. As CONAP matures as an independent government institution, the more that international assistance has been fleeing the RBM and affecting the funding for many of the NGO's that were committed to the communities to provide the needed technical assistance and entrepreneurial expertise for the proper management of the forest leading to the financial burden of conservation to fall more and more on the communities. CONAP has readjusted some regulations to make it possible for communities to choose certified forest agents to fulfill the would-be roles of NGO's. Many of these agents have already been contracted by FORESCOM, but FORESCOM is also becoming one of these certified forest agents to be able to provide these services itself. Estimates have been made that upon completion of certification, FORESCOM will create a 20% reduction in the cost of audits and recertification required every five years. Additionally, USAID donated $300,000 to develop road infrastructure leading to and within concession areas for more environmentally friendly transport of products. Besides providing marketing, accounting and financial planning services, FORESCOM is also considering expanding their capacities to include processing of wood materials to meet the demands of an international market for dry and semi-processed wood and to add value to the products coming out of the concessions. Due to its close ties with ACOFOP, the Forest Stewardship Council, the certifying body of forest agents, will have to oversee concerns for corruption and quality deterioration. Although the certification from the FSC does not add value or open markets to concession products, it does help the community forestry framework maintain a “green image” by indicating strict rules for forest management.

=== Narco Ganaderia ===
Illegal activity in the Peten region has historical precedents in the logging industry and periods of land-grabs. However, in the recent years the drug trade in the RBM has been growing drastically to the point that it poses one of the greatest threats to the protected areas. The RBM is attractive to drug traffickers as it is remote meaning many portions can only be reached on foot and the lack of government oversight coupled with fluid borers to ease the movement of drugs in and out of the country. Many of the forest fires that occur in the region are deliberate attempts by traffickers to clear areas for labs, runway strips, and grazing land for cattle used as a way to launder profits from the drug trade. Since January 2016, Guatemalan authorities have 2,588 kilograms of cocaine (valued at $34.7 million), 17.6 million poppy plants (valued at $57.6 million), and 570,316 marijuana plants (valued at $28 million). The same authorities estimate that over 8,000 hectares of protected land have been burned because of the drug trade.
