= Witzna =

Pre-Columbian Mayan archaeological site in Guatemala

Witzna is a mid-sized archaeological site of the pre-Columbian Maya civilization, situated in the Petén Basin region of what is now northern Guatemala. Inscriptions discovered on site indicate that the city was known to the ancient Mayans as Bahlam Jol. Significant occupancy is dated to the Classic period of Mesoamerican chronology. It is located near the confluence of the Holmul and Ixcán Rivers, near the site of Chanchich II.

The site's main center (dubbed the "Acropolis") contains several palaces (two of which are 2 stories high), stepped-pyramid "temples" and a ballcourt. A sacbe joins this complex with the "Sculptures Complex", to the west. There are 3 stelae and 2 altars. The main residential area is at the eastern side of the site.

Archaeological evidence shows that a large fire destroyed much of the city at the end of the 7th century, which corresponds to a hieroglyphic account in nearby Naranjo describing the burning of a rebellious vassal city named Bahlam Jol dated to 21 May 697 CE. This event caused a significant decline in the population of the city, with many of its inhabitants likely enslaved or taken prisoner by Naranjo. The city was rebuilt during the early 700s CE, though less prominent and more sparsely populated than before. The royal dynasty ruling Bahlam Jol lasted another century after the conflagration, and traces of farming around the city continued for several more centuries after that.
