= Maya architecture =

Architecture style

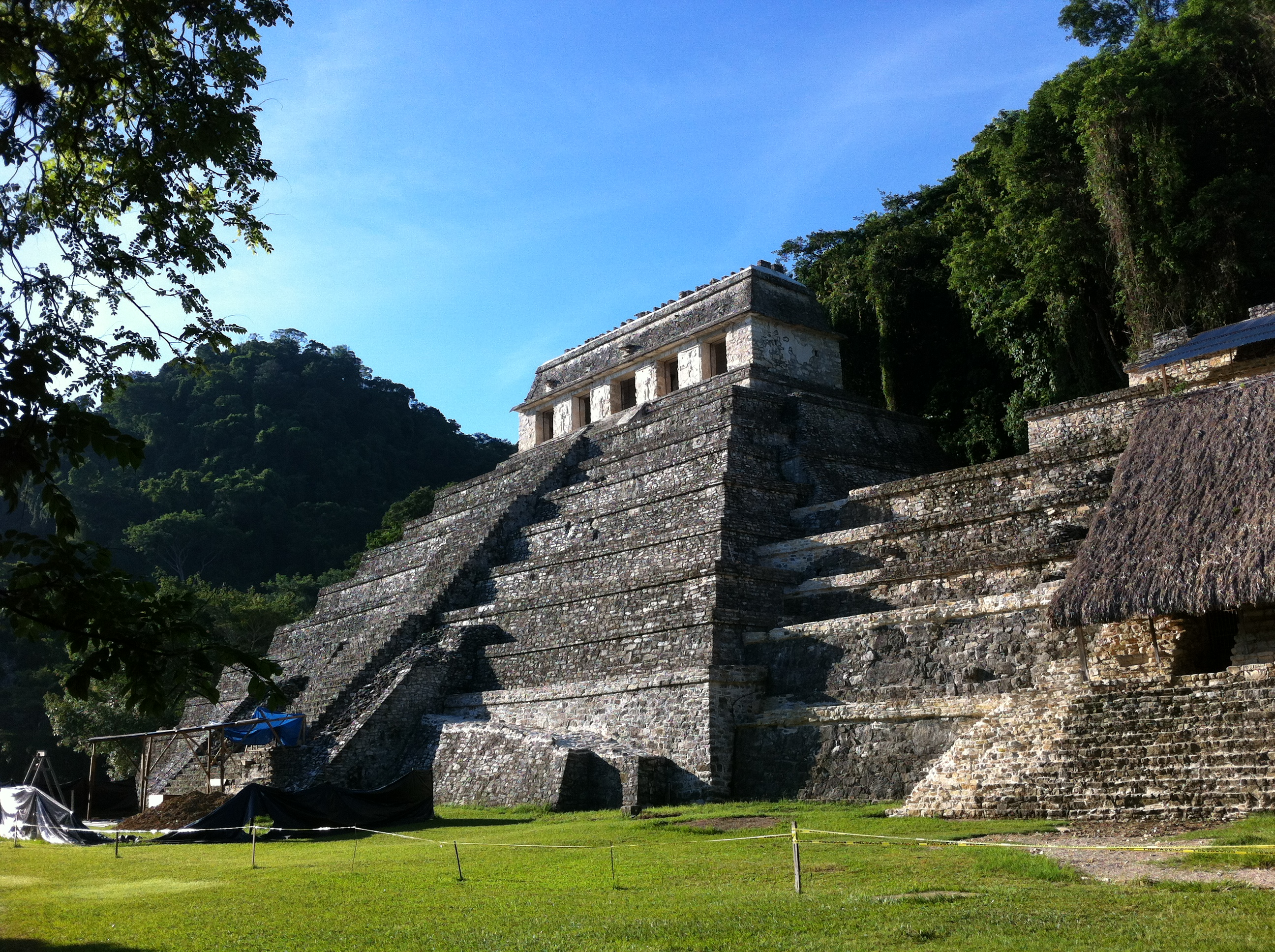
Palenque, Chiapas

The Mayan architecture of the Maya civilization spans across several thousands of years, several eras of political change, and architectural innovation before the Spanish colonization of the Americas. Often, the buildings most dramatic and easily recognizable as creations of the Maya peoples are the step pyramids of the Terminal Preclassic Maya period and beyond. Based in general Mesoamerican architectural traditions, the Maya utilized geometric proportions and intricate carving to build everything from simple houses to ornate temples. This article focuses on the more well-known pre-classic and classic examples of Maya architecture. The temples like the ones at Palenque, Tikal, and Uxmal represent a zenith of Maya art and architecture. Through the observation of numerous elements and stylistic distinctions, remnants of Maya architecture have become an important key to understanding their religious beliefs and culture as a whole.

== Urban design ==
As Maya cities spread throughout the varied geography of Mesoamerica, the extent of site planning appears to have been minimal, their cities having been built somewhat haphazardly as dictated by the topography of each independent location. Maya architecture tends to integrate a great degree of natural features. For instance, some cities existing on the flat limestone plains of the northern Yucatán grew into great sprawling municipalities, while others built in the hills of Usumacinta utilized the natural loft of the topography to raise their towers and temples to impressive heights. However, some semblance of order, as required by any large city, still prevailed. At the onset of large-scale construction, a predetermined axis was typically established in congruence with the cardinal directions. Depending upon the location and availability of natural resources such as fresh-water wells, or cenotes, the city grew by connecting great plazas with the numerous platforms that created the sub-structure for nearly all Maya buildings, by means of sacbeob causeways. As more structures were added and existing structures re-built or remodelled, the great Maya cities seemed to take on an almost random identity that contrasts sharply with other great Mesoamerican cities such as Teotihuacan and its rigid grid-like construction.

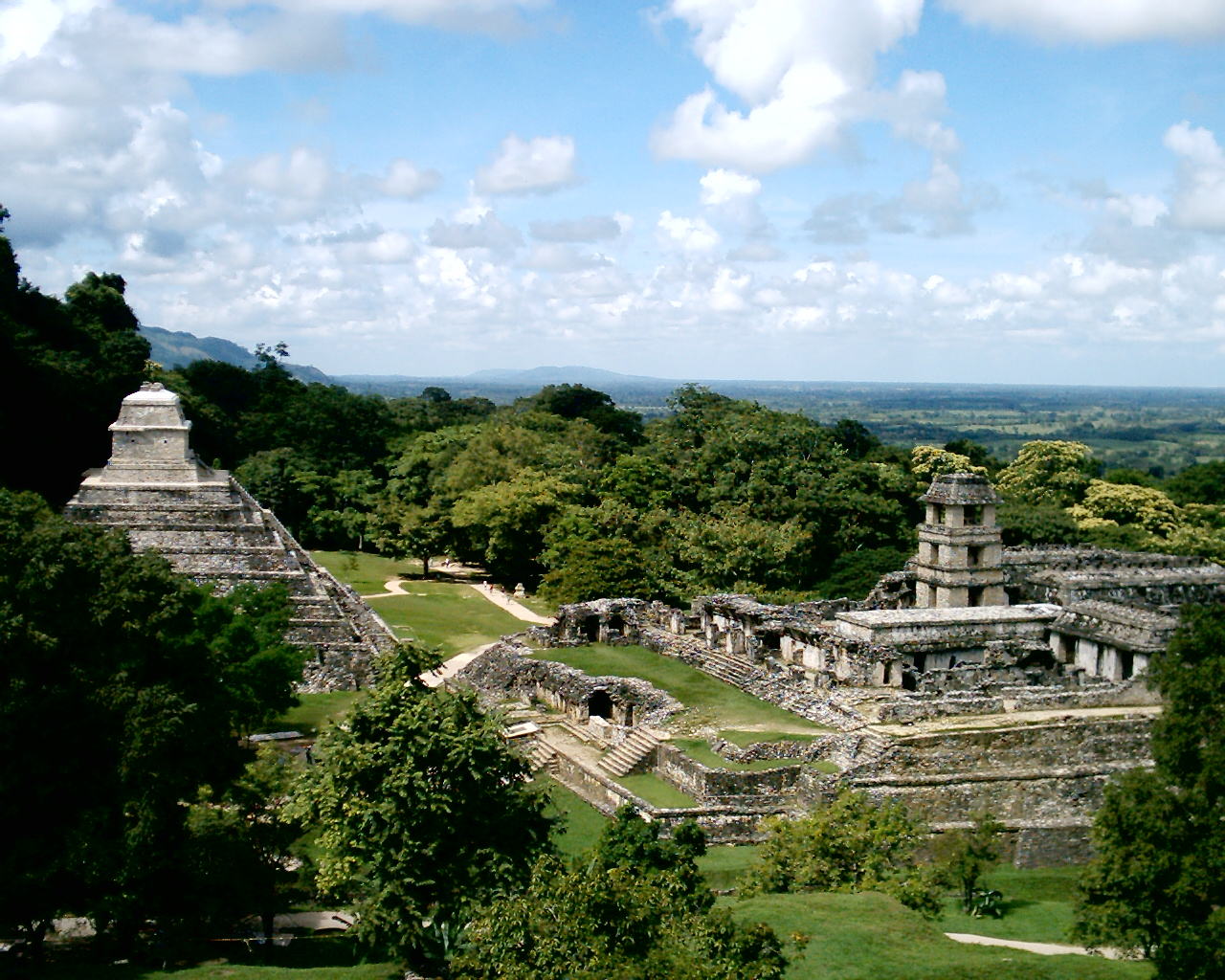
Archaeological site at Palenque, Chiapas, Mexico

At the heart of the Maya city existed the large plazas surrounded by their most valued governmental and religious buildings such as the royal acropolis, great pyramid temples, and occasionally ballcourts. Though city layouts evolved as nature dictated, careful attention was placed on the directional orientation of temples and observatories so that they were constructed in accordance with the Maya interpretation of the orbits of the stars. Immediately outside this ritual center were the structures of lesser nobles, smaller temples, and individual shrines: the less sacred and less important structures had a greater degree of privacy. Outside the constantly evolving urban core were the less permanent and more modest homes of the common people.

Classic Era Maya urban design could easily be described as the division of space by great monuments and causeways. In this case, the open public plazas were the gathering places for the people and the focus of the urban design, while interior space was entirely secondary. Only in the Late Post-Classic era did the great Maya cities develop into more fortress-like defensive structures that lacked, for the most part, the large and numerous plazas of the Classic. In the Postclassic in Peten, Guatemala, smaller protected settlements emerged in defensible locations, for example on peninsulas and islands in the Petén Basin. These sites had diminutive plazas, and smaller ceremonials structures and the canons of architectural design were modified from the previous Classic period but were recognizable design shifts from the Classic patterning.

== Architectural styles ==
Maya architecture can be identified, depending on the region and the corresponding period, into different styles. The regional architectural styles have unique characteristics, features and elements that show diverse social and political aspects of the different regions and history periods of the Maya civilization.

=== Puuc ===
The Puuc style is the most complex and detailed, considered the pinnacle of Maya architecture, implementing architectural, constructive and highly elaborated decorative aspects. It is the distinctive architectural style of the Puuc region of northern Yucatan that developed during the Postclassic period. The buildings are mostly great pyramids, temples and palaces richly decorated in the upper façades with intricate stone mosaics, alternating repeated geometric figures with more elaborate sculptures. A common feature found in its ornamentation are columns with god Chaak masks, usually placed in the corners. the Puuc style also represented a major architectural advance of the Maya civilization, the Puuc style used coated concrete on walls and vaults, and these were covered with stones of finely carved edges replacing the use of large stones set on top of one another using mud mortar for structural support of earlier Classic period Maya styles. Example: Uxmal, Kabah, Sayil, Labna

=== Petén ===
It was one of the main styles of the major sites of the central and southern Maya Lowlands it developed since the late Preclassic period of Mesoamerica until the end of the Classic period with the collapse of the Maya civilization that caused the abandonment of the major sites in this region. One of its most recognizable features are enormous buildings and tall pyramids with long staircases and temples at the top some of which have flat roof combs. The temples and facades of the structures in this style are flat and lack of decorations. The Petén style was highly influenced by Teotihuacán architecture in features such as the use of the talud-tablero and stepped platforms. Example: Calakmul, Tikal, Naranjo, Dzibanche, Ichkabal

=== Palencan ===
It was developed by Palenque and its the distinctive unique style of the city, it was also imposed in the subordinated sites of the kingdom of Palenque. The buildings and temples are on pyramidal bases with elegant sculptures in stucco and carved stone. The buildings have vaulted rooms and high Maya arches, as well as staircases with alfardas. The temples have facades with 3 or 5 wide entrances which gives clarity and light to the interior of the rooms. At the top of the buildings there are large double-walled roof combs with rectangular openings and decorative sculptures. Example: Palenque, Xupa, Chancalá.

=== Megalithic ===
Developed in the great city of Izamal and diffused in near sites, the style is characterized by buildings, temples and pyramids of great size and height built with huge flat blocks and slabs of finely carved stone. The buildings include wide attached staircases, inclined slopes and stepped vaults.It is also found in the Yalahau region. Example: Izamal, Ake, X'baatún.

=== Pixa'an ===
It is a style unique and characteristic of the city of Kohunlich, the structures have smooth stone walls, niches in the facades, stylized rounded jambs at the entrances and embedded columns, also characterized by using dry stone without mortar for the buildings. Example: Kohunlich

=== Chiapas Highlands ===
Pyramid shaped buildings of different levels in a quadrangular shape with stairs flanked by alfardas and altars built on natural elevations, also characterized by the use of stonemasonry walls in the buildings. Example: Chinkultic, Tenam Puente.

=== Gulf Coast ===
The constructions in this style are made from dirt and clay with stucco-covered bricks due to the natural features of the region, the buildings are mainly stepped pyramids with front stairs, sloping walls and platforms decorated with sculptures and masks alluding to mythological events, aquatic animals and rulers. The funerary enclosures are formed by pyramidal bases. Example: Comalcalco.

=== Pacific Coast ===
Small platforms and low-rise flat pyramidal bases with features influenced by major sites of central Mexico, characterized by the simplicity of the constructions as well as the lack of decoration and very low detail in the structures. Considered the simplest architectural style it developed in the middle and late Postclassic period. Example: Iximche, Mixco Viejo, Gumarcaj.

== Building process ==
All evidence suggests that most stone buildings existed on top of a platform that varied in height from less than a meter to 45 meters depending on the importance of the building. A flight of stone steps often split the large platforms on one side, contributing to the common bi-symmetrical appearance of Maya architecture. Depending on the prevalent stylistic tendencies of an area, these platforms most often were built of stucco and cut stone exteriors filled with densely packed gravel. As is the case with many other Maya reliefs, those on the platforms often were related to the intended purpose of the residing structure. Thus, as the sub-structural platforms were completed, the grand residences and temples of the Maya were constructed on the solid foundations of the platforms. As all structures were built, little attention seems to have been given to their utilitarian functionality and much to external aesthetics; however, a certain repeated aspect, the corbelled arch, was often utilized to mimic the appearance and feel of the simple Maya hut.

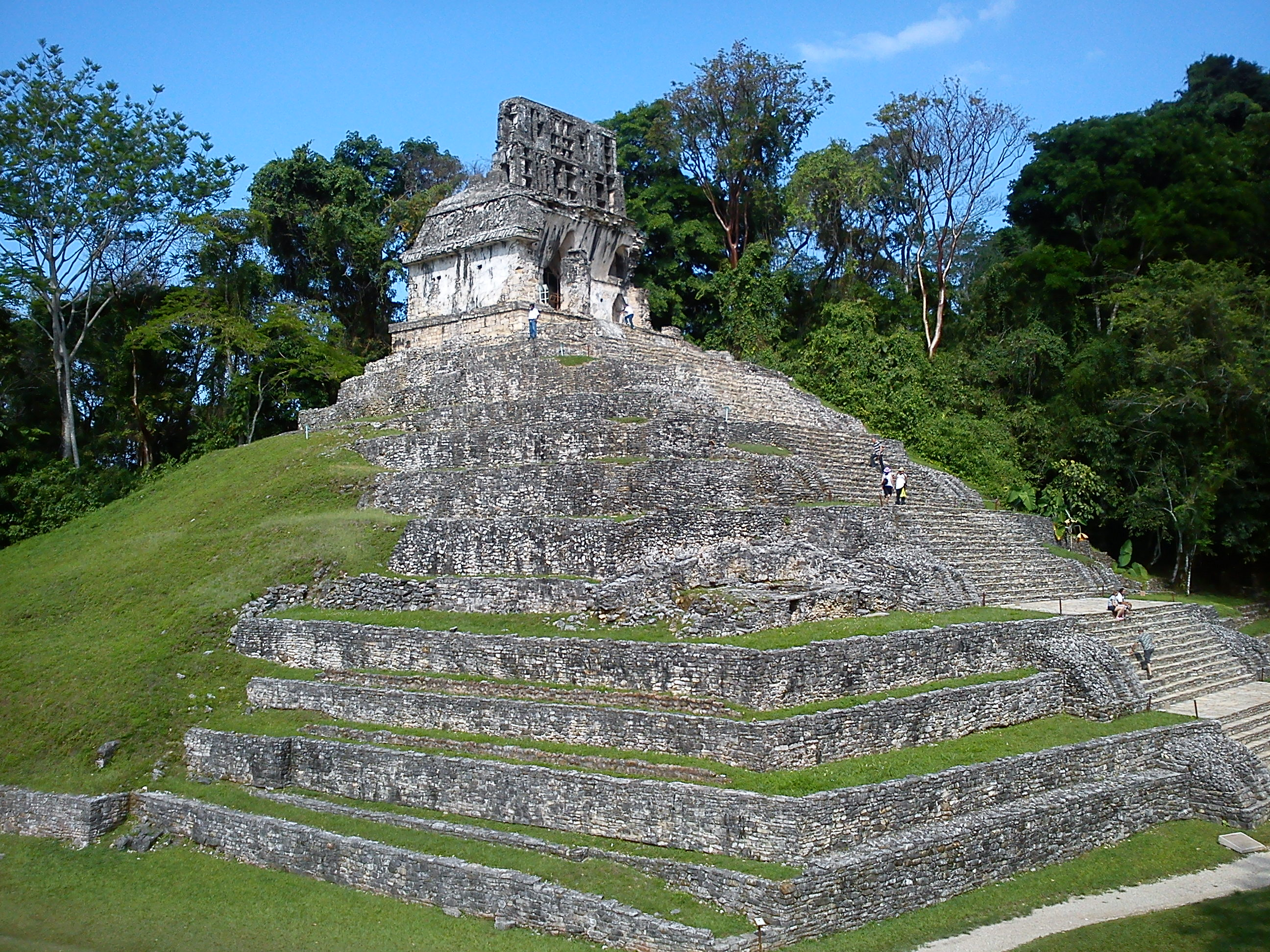
Temple of the Cross, Palenque

Though not an effective tool to increase interior space, as it required thick stone walls to support the high ceiling, some temples utilized repeated arches, or a corbelled vault, to construct what the Maya referred to as pibnal, or sweatbath, such as those in the Temple of the Cross at Palenque. As structures were completed, typically extensive relief work was added to the layer of stucco. However, many lintel carvings have been discovered, as well as actual stone carvings used as a facade. Commonly, these would continue uninterrupted around an entire structure and contain a variety of artwork pertaining to the inhabitants or purpose of a building. Though not the case in all Maya locations, broad use of painted stucco has been discovered as well.

Though the Maya did not use a specific measuring unit, their buildings were still proportioned according to the golden mean. For their homes, the Maya would begin with a square then use a cord or vine to measure the square corner to corner. Then by arcing the cord down, a new base length could be established based on the previous square. The new rectangle's length would be the square root of two, which is a proportion found in nature. Since the Maya had religious connotations for which proportions they used and when their form of measurement is called sacred geometry. It was also practiced by the Egyptians. The Maya played with different proportions in their temples and homes to yield symmetrical and harmonious designs all without the use of actual units.

It has been suggested that, in conjunction with the Maya Long Count Calendar, every fifty-two years, or cycle, temples and pyramids were remodelled and rebuilt. It appears now that the rebuilding process was often instigated by a new ruler or for political matters, as opposed to matching the calendar cycle. However, the process of rebuilding on top of old structures is indeed a common one. Most notably, the North Acropolis at Tikal seems to be the sum total of 1,500 years of architectural modifications.

Building materials

The Maya civilization used very simple tools for building their structures. The most common tools use were made of stone found in surrounding areas. Limestone was a huge part of the Maya tool making, as limestone was geographically very abundant in most settlements. Locations of the Maya cities were chosen with the access to necessary stones in mind. This allowed most quarries to be right outside the city for easy access to blocks needed for construction. Top limestone quarries used were Palenque and Tikal. Though limestone was the most important material, they still collected sandstone from Quiriguá and volcanic tuff from Copan.

The Maya people had taken advantage of mortar on most structural projects. The Mayas used a very difficult process of limestone under large amounts of heat to create their mortar. The mortar was so widely used, the Mayas even used it for sculptures, facades, and floor layers. Their mortar was very effective on a large building lifetime, but humid climates can have a negative effect on the mortar.

For more important construction projects the Mayas would cover the entire structures exterior with stucco, followed by bright paintings, prioritizing red, yellow, green, and blue.

== Notable constructions ==
=== Ceremonial platforms ===
These were commonly limestone platforms of typically less than four meters in height where public ceremonies and religious rites were performed. Constructed in the fashion of a typical foundation platform, these were often accented by carved figures, altars and perhaps tzompantli, a stake used to display the heads to the victims or defeated Mesoamerican ballgame opponents. The Mayans often depicted Flora and Fauna in their architecture. Some examples of this are statues and depictions of corn in Mayan architecture.

=== Palaces ===
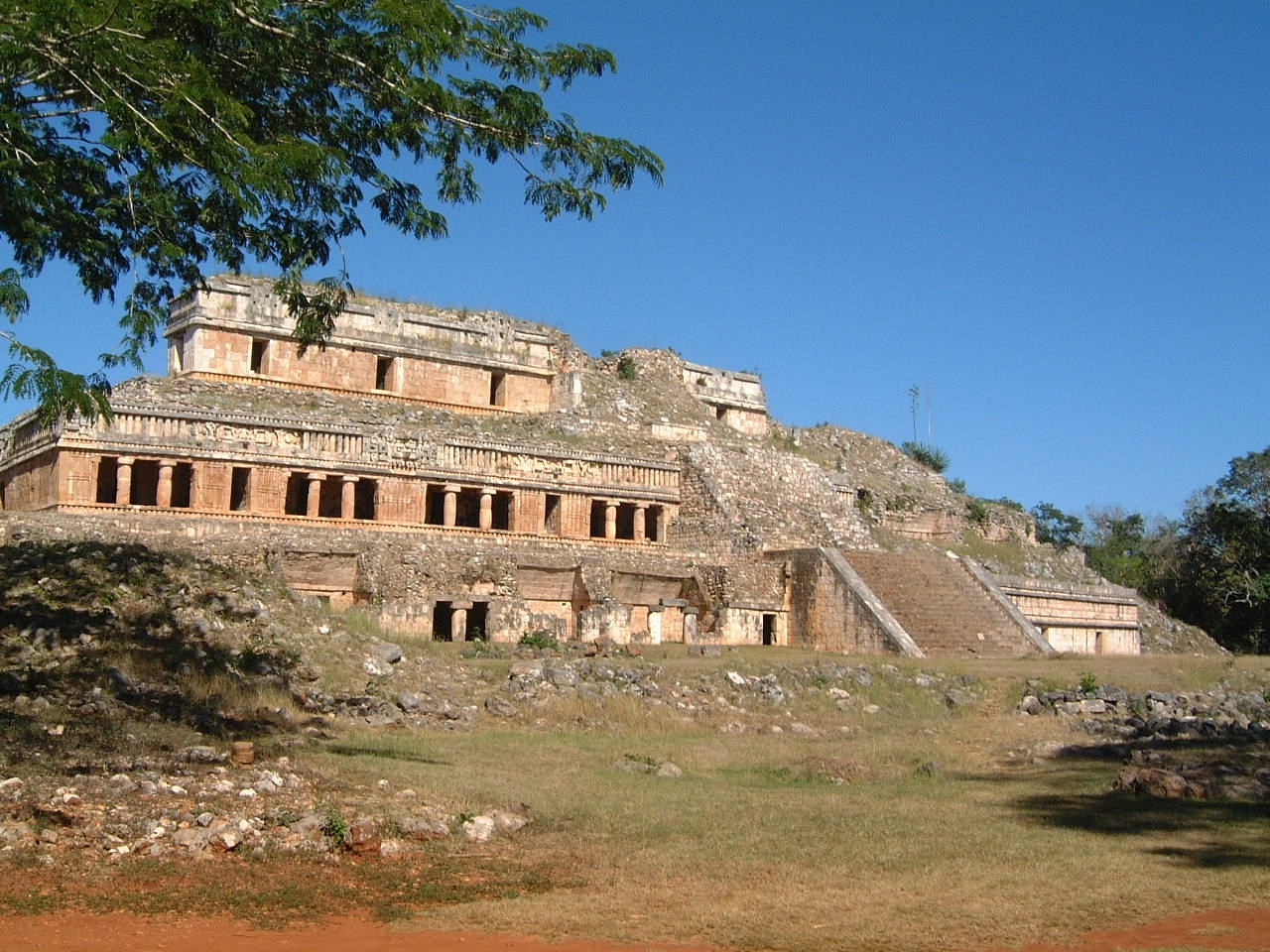
Remains of the Palace of Sayil, Yucatán

Large and often highly decorated, the palaces usually sat close to the center of a city and housed the population's elite. Every exceedingly large royal palace, or one consisting of many chambers on different levels might be referred to as an acropolis. However, often these were one-story and consisted of small chambers and typically at least one interior courtyard; these structures appear to take into account the needed functionality required of a residence, as well as the decoration required for their inhabitants stature. Archaeologists seem to agree that many palaces are home to various tombs.

At Copán (one of the most powerful and important cities), beneath over four-hundred years of later remodeling, a tomb for one of the ancient rulers has been discovered and the North Acropolis at Tikal appears to have been the site of numerous burials during the Terminal Pre-classic and Early Classic periods.

=== E-groups ===
"E-Group" is a classification given by Mayanists to certain structure complexes present at a number of Maya sites located in the central and southern Maya lowlands (e.g., the Petén region). Complexes of this type consist of a stepped pyramid main structure, situated on the western side of a quadrilateral plaza or platform. A raised but rather elongated structure appears along the eastern side of the plaza, running north–south; a variation has three smaller temple mounds on top of or replacing this platform, the middle of these substructures placed directly opposite the main structure. Often, two other subsidiary structures appear on the north and south sides of the plaza, respectively. The main western structure is typically terraced (i.e. has several levels), with inset stairways on each of its four sides, with only the eastern stairway, leading from the plaza, providing access to the summit. The stairways have large balustrades which protrude from the pyramid, which were decorated with large stucco masks and panels of architectural art. In other examples, believed to be of a later date, this quadripartite stairway configuration is lacking.

E-group complexes are named after their prototypical example, Structure E-VII-sub at the site of Uaxactun. They were first identified as a meaningful complex by archaeologist Frans Blom in 1924, who excavated the site under the auspices of the Carnegie Institution of Washington.

It has been theorized that these E-groups are observatories, because the eponymous group at Uaxactun contains alignments corresponding approximately to sunrises on the solstices and equinoxes. However, the architectural sequence documented in excavation reports reveals that these alignments connect elements from different periods and thus could have never been observationally functional. Besides, all other E-groups have different orientations, which pertain to widespread groups of astronomical alignments that are also embedded in a number of buildings of other types. Therefore, and considering that their primary uses were ritual and funerary, there are no grounds to designate E Groups as observatories. Other ideas seem to stem from the possible creation story told by the relief and artwork that adorns these structures.

=== Triadic Groups ===
They consist of an elevated platform (either an extensive acropolis or a steep pyramid) with a monumental stairway, with a central building facing the stairs, and two lateral structures facing each other on both sides of the platform. This formal complex has been attributed to the earthly re-creation of the Celestial Hearth (modern-day constellation of Orion), or a stage for enthronement rituals. Most recently Triadic Groups have been interpreted as sanctuaries commemorating Maize God's resurrection upon the Flowery Mountain. Such complexes appear during the Late Preclassic times and gradually decrease in number until their disappearance in the Early Postclassic.

=== Pyramids and temples ===
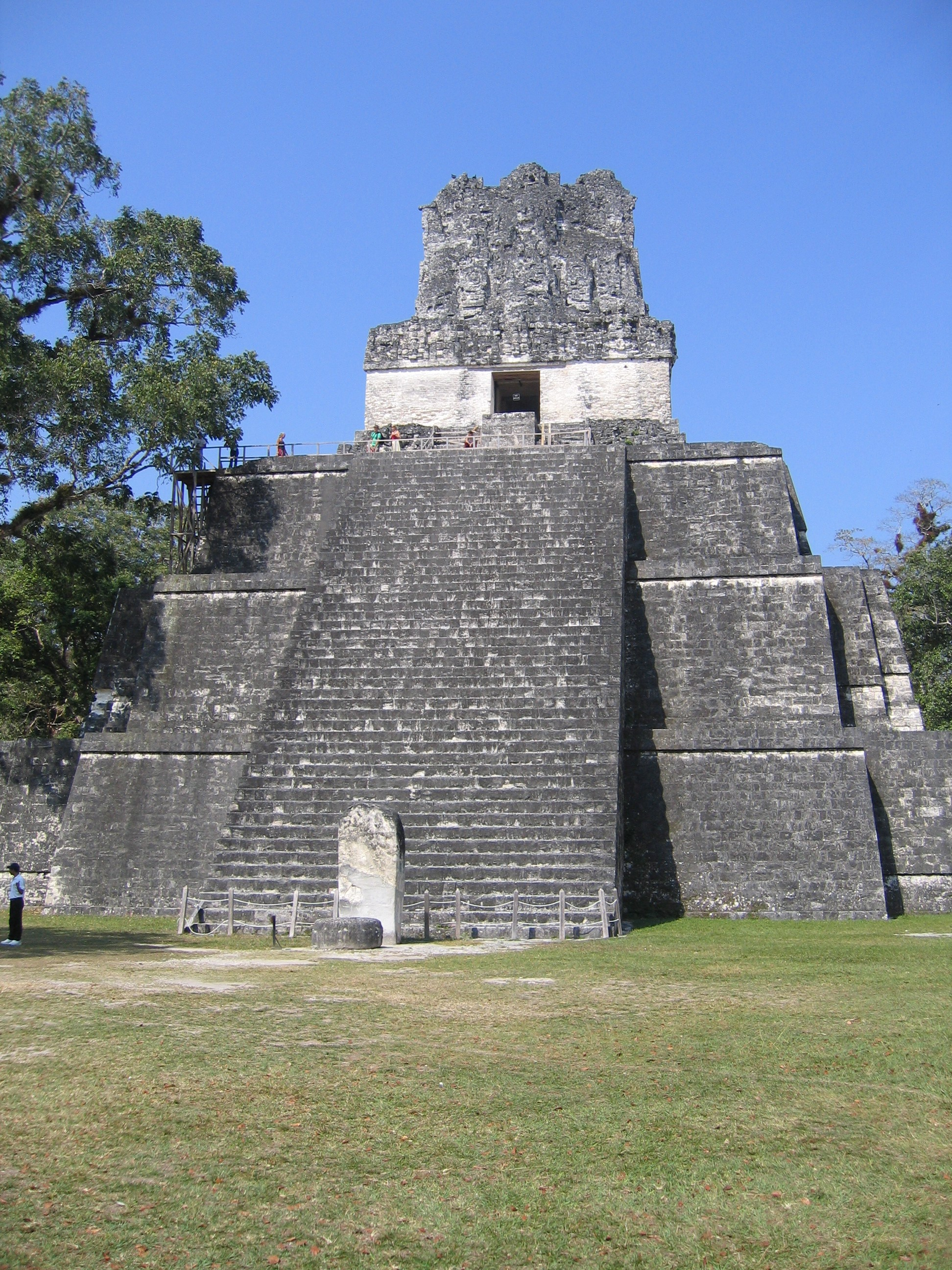
Tikal, temple pyramid with prominent roof comb

Often the most important sanctuaries sat atop towering Maya pyramids, some of over two hundred feet, such as that at El Mirador. The sanctuary on top commonly was heightened by a crest or roof comb. While recent discoveries point toward the extensive use of pyramids as tombs, the temples themselves seem to rarely, if ever, contain burials. Maya pyramids had flat tops and were similar to the Aztec pyramids, though The Aztecs were the individuals who built their pyramids indistinguishable.

At Chichén Itzá there is a pyramid called El Castillo ('the castle'). With four stairways, each with 91 steps (with the upper platform they sum up to 365), and having other architectural elements appearing in astronomically significant numbers, it is a good example of Maya myth and astronomical cycles joined in architecture. Ancient Egyptian civilizations believed there were powers in the sky that brought the rain and even kept hurricanes away. In order to get close enough for the powers to hear them, they built pyramids. The Mesopotamians built ziggurats that were similar to pyramids with steps. Additionally, the Mayas and many of the other Mesoamericans built their pyramids high above the surrounding forests to see the heavens. Besides honoring the gods on high, Maya pyramids also served as observatories for solar events. The Maya pyramids even aligned well with cardinal directions, or north, east, west, and south, so that they were used like a compass. Also referred to as the Pyramid of Kukulcán, the structure provides a remarkable display, observed by thousands of modern visitors at the equinoxes. The setting sun's rays are projected on the northern balustrade, creating the illusion of a snake winding its way down the steps of the pyramid. The snake is composed of several triangle shapes giving it the appearance of a diamondback snake. At the base of the northern stairway, there are massive snake head sculptures, making this effect even more persuasive. While it is a widespread belief that this light-and-shadow effect was achieved on purpose to record the equinoxes, the idea is highly unlikely: it has been shown that the phenomenon can be observed, without major changes, during several weeks around the equinoxes, making it impossible to determine any date by observing this effect alone.

Maya architecture is vastly different from the others in Meso-American cultures. The blend of mythology and astronomical events can be found in nearly all Maya palaces or pyramid structures. One will also notice the heavy influence of the Toltecs in the architecture at Chichén Itzá. The Toltecs invaded the Maya and merged their cultural traditions around the year 1000.

=== Observatories ===
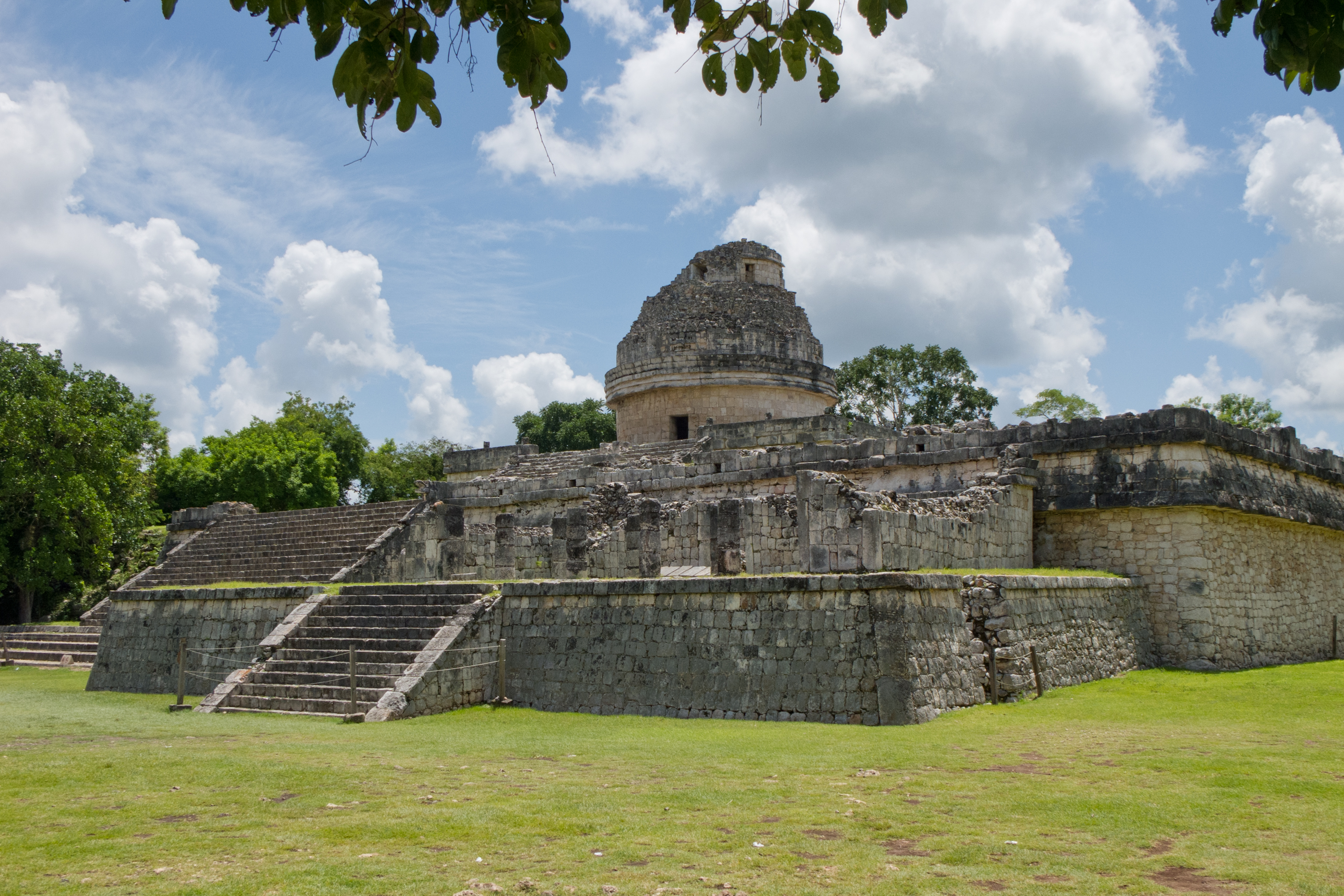
El Caracol, the Observatory, Chichen Itza, Mexico

The Maya were keen astronomers and had mapped out the phases of celestial objects, especially the Sun, Venus and the Moon. Many temples have doorways and other features aligning to celestial events. Round temples, often dedicated to Kukulcan, are perhaps those most often described as "observatories" by modern ruin tour-guides. It is now known, however, that many buildings of different types and uses were oriented on astronomical grounds, mostly to sunrises and sunsets on specific dates. The dates recorded are concentrated in four agriculturally significant seasons and tend to be separated by multiples of elementary periods of the calendrical system (13 and 20 days), suggesting that the orientations allowed the use of observational calendars intended to facilitate a proper scheduling of agricultural and associated ceremonial activities. Although most of the important Maya buildings were oriented on the basis of astronomical criteria, their primary functions were religious, residential or administrative; the label "observatory" applied to any structural type is thus hardly warranted.

=== Religion ===
Mayan religion is polytheistic and was an important part of their daily lives. The gods they worship included Itzam Na, the creator god, Kinich Ahau, the sun god, Ah Puch, a death god, and Buluc Chabtan, the war god. The Maya believed that all things, including inanimate objects, had a soul and could influence the world and believe in an afterlife called Xibalba, where the soul is tormented by underworld gods until it passes to heaven.

=== Ballcourts ===
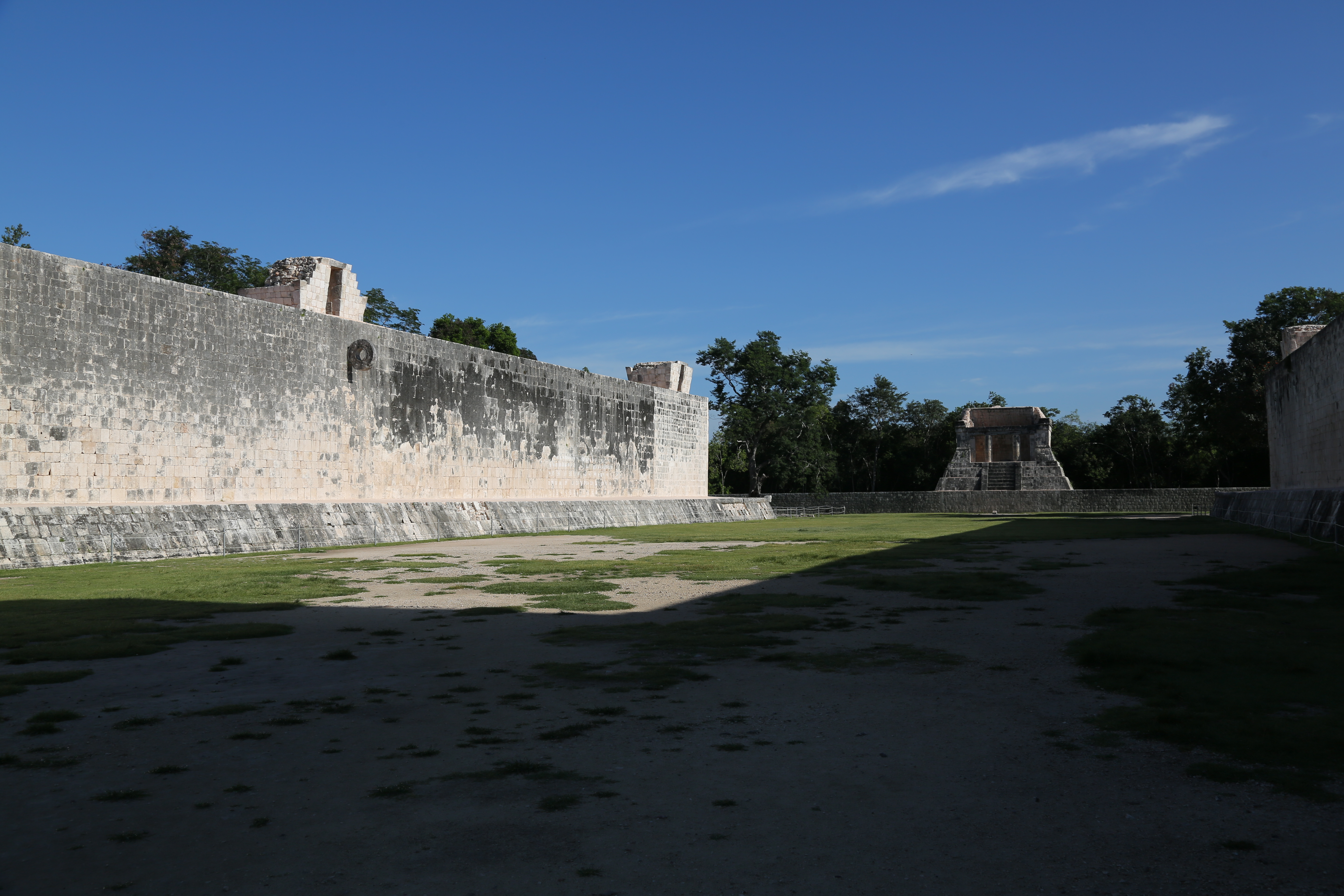
Great Ballcourt at Chichen Itza

As an integral aspect of the Mesoamerican lifestyle, the courts for their ritual ballgame were constructed throughout the Maya realm, often on a grand scale. The playing alleys of ballcourts were defined by two long walls. Courts built earlier in Maya history (as at Cobá) had sloped sides, while ones built later (as at Chichén Itzá) had vertical sides. Frequently, the ends were enclosed so as to create an -shaped court when viewed from above.

When the Maya played games in the ballcourts, the ball was made of solid rubber and was sometimes as much as a foot in diameter. It was passed between teams ranged on opposite ends of the court. The players could hit it only with their knees or hips, much like football or soccer today. Points could be scored when the opponents failed to return the ball correctly. In central Mexico, and in late times in Yucatán, rings of stone were set high up in the side walls of the court. It was considered a particular triumph for a player to knock the ball through the ring.

== Cave sites ==
There are also cave sites that are important to the Maya. Maya cave sites include Jolja Cave, the cave site at Naj Tunich, the Candelaria Caves, and the Cave of the Witch. There are also cave creation myths among the Maya. Some cave sites are still used by the modern Maya in the Chiapas highlands in Mexico. Some of these caves were completely or partially artificial.

== See also ==
- Ancient American engineering
- Mayan Revival architecture – 1920s–1930s modern architectural style
- Triadic pyramid – Style in Mayan architecture
- Twin pyramid complex
