= Holmul River =

Holmul River may refer to:

- Holmul River (Guatemala), a river in northeastern Guatemala, upper tributary of the Rio Bravo
- Holmul River (Romania), a river in Romania, tributary of the Tazlăul Sărat

== See also ==
- Holmul (disambiguation)
