= Holmul (disambiguation) =

Holmul may refer to:

- Holmul, Guatemala, archaeological site of the Maya civilization
- Holmul River (Guatemala), a river in northeastern Guatemala, upper tributary of the Rio Bravo
- Holmul River (Romania), a river in Romania, tributary of the Tazlăul Sărat
