= Kʼo =

Kʼo is one of several Mayan ceremonial center sites around and associated with the Classic Mayan city of Holmul located in modern-day Guatemala. Currently, the site boasts what may be the royal tomb of the earliest known Mayan ruler.

== Geography ==
The site is located 15 kilometers west of the Belize border and 80 kilometers south of the Mexican border. It is one of several sites within a 6 km radius of Holmul and is southeast of Holmul across the Holmul River. The entire Holmul complex is located within Northeastern Guatemala in the central lowland Peten region. The area receives an average of 80 in. (2000 mm) of rainfall annually and temperatures generally range from 70-95 F (25-35 C) similar to the neighboring southern lowlands. The site of Kʼo sits at about 200–250 meters above sea level on the edge of the highland plateau. This placement allows the site easy access to wetlands and water sources. In fact, Kʼo elevation places it above several aguadas (water sources for various sites in the area) that branch from the Holmul River.

== Discovery ==
Instituto de Antropología e Historia inspector Francisco Moro informed Boston University's recently created Holmul Archeological Project of the existence of the Kʼo site in 2000. Over the next decade, both Vanderbilt University and then Boston University led The Holmul Archeological Project at Holmul and associated sites such as Kʼo. The Project mapped the sites, excavated artifacts, and salvaged damage done by looters.

=== Layout ===
The Kʼo site core contains several large pyramid structures atop platforms arranged amongst the site's plazas.

== History ==
=== Settlement ===
The Holmul region experienced 1900 years of uninterrupted human occupation from the Early Middle Preclassic to the Late Classic with several sites occupied at one time. Evidence provided by dated ceramics throughout the Kʼo site suggests occupation for 1500 years from the Late Middle Preclassic to the Terminal Classic Period. At the time of settlement, the central lowlands underwent a period of factionalization allowing various ceremonial sites like Kʼo to develop in the area. Lowland Maya settlement patterns suggest non-nucleated settlement in the area, as opposed to earlier assumptions of nucleated development.

=== Rise ===
Public architecture rose and peaked prominently during the Terminal Preclassic before gradually declining throughout the later periods. The ball court at Kʼo dates to the Terminal Preclassic. Different plazas also usually date to the Terminal Preclassic, though there is evidence for renovations, reconstruction, and construction of new plaza areas through the Early Classic.

=== Decline ===
Long term political decline occurred at Kʼo throughout the Classic period. The exact cause of Kʼo's decline remains unknown, though many archaeologists attribute the decline to the centralization of two major polities in the area, Holmul and Cival. Cival dominated the region politically throughout the Late Preclassic and archaeologists view Holmul's growing political authority over the region throughout the Classic period as an undermining force of Kʼo elite authority.

In his 2009 doctoral dissertation, John Tomasic analyzed the distribution and re-distribution of luxury goods (jade and shell goods) by elites as well as the distribution of domestic goods (obsidian blades and grinding stones) obtained through non-elite market bartering. Tomasic found that throughout the site's occupation, luxury goods used in elite economic reciprocal exchange gradually declined at the site over time which correlates with the ceremonial sites decline in power. the marketplace goods which non-elite citizens traded for at the site remained largely unaffected throughout Kʼo's decline, suggesting ruling elite did not have as much control over the market place as other Mayan archaeologists argue.

Both the decline of public construction and distribution of luxury goods suggest that the elite at the Kʼo site were no longer powerful enough to commission public architecture or trade luxury goods with other groups as they previously did in the Terminal Preclassic. The site most likely maintained a close political relationship with the Holmul and related sites during the Classic period. Different scholars debate whether the site and its relationship with Holmul reflected a hierarchy of scale or a hierarchy of control, though others argue both.

== The Jester God headdress (royal title) ==
In 2008, archaeologists investigating a wealthy Mayan home at Kʼo dug into a tunnel that led to a chultun or storage area filled with eight different pieces of pottery dating back to the Late Middle Preclassic and Late Preclassic. Upon further investigation, archeologists realized the chultun was a tomb of a man ranging from 40–50 years old. The man lay facing south while his flexed arms lay with hands crossing. Two vessels containing the skull and the mandible were placed alongside the body of the skeleton in the Mayan lip-to-lip tradition.

The archaeologists also discovered an incense burner alongside the man which depicted a Jester God Headband or maize god with hun jewel (symbol of rulership). Mayan scholars associate the Jester God Headdress iconography with Mayan ruler status based on later artwork depicting a ruler or ajaw with the headdress. This discovery precedes what scholars believed to be the earliest Mayan ruler in 150 BC, as the tomb dates back to 350 BC, thus pushing the earliest known Mayan ruler back two centuries.

Some scholars interpret this find as a sign that the institutionalization of 'ajaw' occurred before Mayan rulership became associated with divine kingship. Another royal tomb found in a residential elite area at San Bartolo in 2005 also supports this interpretation.

This discovery sheds new light on the early Mayan ruler burial during the Late Preclassic. The residents of Kʼo buried this ruler beneath the elite residential area, which may have been a custom early on. It became customary for the later Mayan civilization rulers to be buried in a temple or a pyramid.

== Preservation ==
Currently the Holmul Archaeological Project and archaeologist Francisco Estrada-Belli's non-profit organization the Maya Archaeological Initiative employ four local park rangers to protect Holmul and the associated sites from further looting. Additionally, these rangers protect the site from natural erosion while making sure roofs, trails, and research facilities in the area remain intact for archaeologist use.

== See also ==
- Preclassic Maya
