= Preclassic Maya =

Period in Maya history

The Preclassic period in Maya history stretches from the beginning of permanent village life c. 1000 BC until the advent of the Classic Period c. 250 AD, and is subdivided into Early (prior to 1000 BC), Middle (1000–400 BC), and Late (400 BC – 250 AD). Major archaeological sites of this period include Nakbe, Uaxactun, Seibal, San Bartolo, Cival, and El Mirador.

Maya society underwent a series of profound transformations between c. 100 AD and 250 AD, which resulted in the cessation of monumental building at many Preclassic cities and the inferred collapse of their political and economic systems, often characterized as the "Preclassic Collapse."

== History ==
=== Early Preclassic (2000 BC–1000 BC) ===
The roots of Maya civilization remain obscure, although broad parameters are increasingly well known. Paleo-environmental data indicate the presence of agriculturalists in the Maya lowlands by c. 3000 BC, although permanent agricultural settlements seem to have developed only gradually. Analysis of bones from early Maya grave sites indicate that, although maize had already become a major component of the diet (under 30% at Ceullo, Belize) by this time, fish, meat from game animals, and other hunted or gathered foods still made up a major component of the diet. Along with the gradual development of agriculture, basic forms of pottery began to appear, with simple designs and some slipped vessels. Around this time, the Olmec culture began to emerge in nearby Tabasco, granting the early Maya an important trading partner and beginning a period of prolonged contact that would have profound effects on Maya society.

=== Middle Preclassic (1000 BC–400 BC) ===
Southern Maya area sites

By around the year 1000 BC, the Maya city of Aguada Fénix was built in Tabasco, this archaeological site corresponds to a time of great change for Maya society. Since before its construction, the Mayas were nomads and did not use ceramics. They lived from hunting, fishing, and growing corn. However, from the construction of Aguada Fénix, it is shown that they began to use ceramics and became sedentary. Aguada Fénix marks the beginning of the construction of the Maya city-states that would flourish years later.

The centuries of agricultural village life had begun to form the beginnings of a complex society: Prestige goods such as obsidian mirrors and jade mosaics began to appear, increasing the demand for more extensive trade. Canals and irrigation schemes demanding coordinated human effort began to appear with increasing complexity and scale. Gradually, villages began to include central plazas and earthen mounds, occasionally enhanced by masonry. For instance, the site of La Blanca featured a central mound more than seventy-five feet tall and contained a masonry fragment strongly resembling a head in the distinctive Olmec style. Carved stone stele also began to appear during this period, adorned with portraits of rulers but still devoid of writing. Warfare appears to have intensified during this period, as evidenced by advanced weaponry, rulers beginning to be portrayed as warriors, and the appearance of mass graves and decapitated skeletons.

Beginning around 900 BC, the Pacific coastal region fell under the dominance of the La Blanca statelet, which collapsed around 600BC, to be replaced by a polity centered on the El Ujuxte site. Another early statelet was probably based at the site of Chalchuapa, a town with extensive earthen mounds arranged around several plazas. However, it was likely ruled by the first true Maya city-state, Kaminaljuyu. Lying within modern-day Guatemala City on the shores of Lake Miraflores, Kaminaljuyu developed a powerful government structure that organized massive irrigation campaigns and built numerous intricately designed stone monuments to its rulers. These monuments clearly depict war captives and often show the rulers holding weapons, indicating the Kaminaljuyu polity engaged in active warfare, dominating the Guatemalan highlands for centuries. Kaminaljuyu's main export was the essential resource obsidian, a beautiful volcanic glass that easily fractured into sharp edges, providing arrowheads, knives, and other weapons as well as prestige goods like mirrors. Through trade routes linking the Pacific coast to the Guatemalan highlands and extending to central Mexico (including early interactions with Teotihuacan), Kaminaljuyu imported coastal goods such as marine shells, salt-dried fish, and salt while exporting obsidian tools and blades widely across Mesoamerica, thereby enhancing its regional influence.

Although it is difficult to firmly identify the ethnicity of a people from meager archeological remains, it appears that during this period the Maya began a systematic northward expansion, occupying the Petén Basin where such cities as El Mirador, Tikal, Calakmul, and Tayasal would be built. The dominant site of these early colonists was Nakbe in the El Mirador basin, where the first attested Maya ballcourt and sacbeob (stone causeways) were built. The rulers of Nakbe constructed several stone platforms and erected intricately carved stone and stucco monuments.

During this period, the Olmec culture reached its zenith, centered on the capital of La Venta in modern-day Tabasco near the early Maya centers. Speakers of a Mixe–Zoquean language, the Olmec are generally recognized as the first true civilization in North America. Their capital city of La Venta contains extensive earthworks and stone monuments, including several of the distinctive Olmec stone heads. The Olmec share several features with later Maya culture, including extensive jaguar-worship, a diet dominated by maize, and the use of the cacao plant. Several words entered Mayan from a Mixe–Zoquean language, presumably due to Olmec influence. Many of these borrowings relate to prestige concepts and high culture, indicating that the Middle Preclassic Maya were deeply impressed and influenced by their northwestern neighbors.

=== Late Preclassic (400 BC–100 AD) ===
The Late Preclassic saw the rise of the first Maya states, the Kan Kingdom in the Maya lowlands, with its capital at El Mirador in Guatemala, and a state in the highlands with its capital at Kaminaljuyu. These rival later Classic Maya city-states for scale and monumental architecture. The lowland site of San Bartolo contains the earliest known Maya writing, from around 300 BC, and has murals from around 100 BC depicting Maya creations myths as well as the corontation of a king. The coronation mural shows that there was a Mayan monarchy at this time.

=== Terminal Preclassic (100 AD–250 AD) ===
The Maya states and cities of the Late Preclassic declined in the Terminal Preclassic. El Mirador was almost entirely abandoned, as were many other cities, and the construction of stelae carved with texts in the highlands ceased.

=== Preclassic Collapse ===
The story of the mysterious lost civilization that suddenly collapsed for an unknown reason has captured the popular imagination for well over a century. What is not as widely known is that there were two such "collapses", the first at the end of the Preclassic, and the more famous Classic Maya collapse. The "Preclassic collapse" refers to the systematic decline and abandoning of the major Preclassic cities such as El Mirador around 100 AD. A number of theories have been proposed to explain this collapse, but there is as little consensus here as there is for the causes of the more famous collapse leading to the Postclassic period.

== Culture ==
=== Social structure ===
The archaeological site of Kʼo, associated with the Classic Maya city of Holmul located in modern-day Guatemala, boasts what may be the royal tomb of the earliest known Maya ruler. This tomb has been dated to 350–300 BC, and it contains the earliest evidence of the institution of ajaw (ruler) in the Maya Lowlands.

=== Art and architecture ===
Early Maya architecture is based on the general Mesoamerican architectural traditions. The stepped pyramids were constructed from the Terminal Pre-classic period onwards.

In 2010, archaeologists at Chiapa de Corzo, southern Chiapas, Mexico, announced they have found a dignitary's tomb inside a pyramid that may be the oldest type of burial discovered in Mesoamerica. The grave dates from about 2,700 years ago.

== See also ==
- Takalik Abaj
- Potbelly sculpture
