= Aguada Fénix =

Pre-classic Mayan ruin

- Phoenix Reservoir
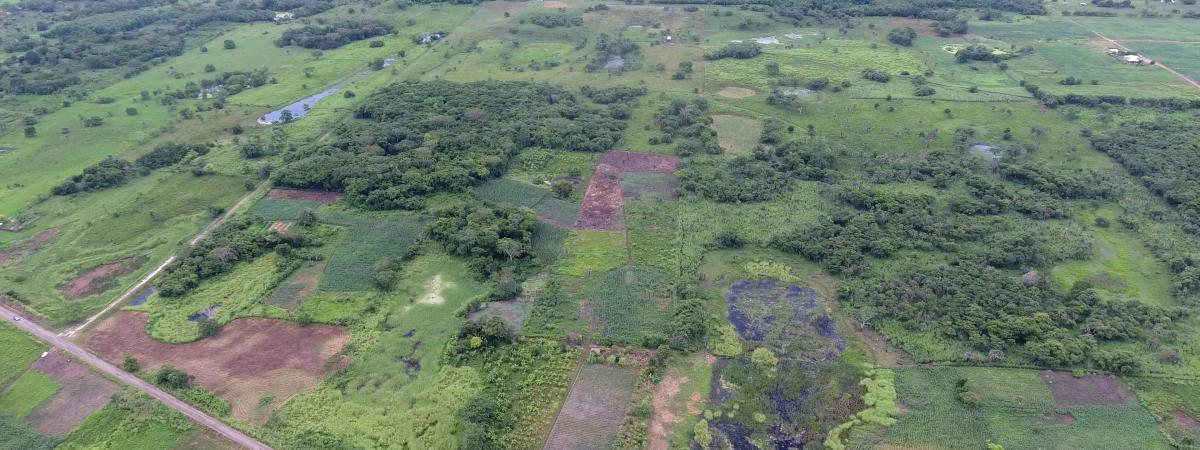
- Aguada Fénix from the air

- Location within Mesoamerica
- 17°48′N 91°09′W
- Periods: Preclassic
- Cultures: Maya civilization
- Location: Tabasco, Mexico

History
- Built: 1000 BC - 800 BC
- Abandoned: 750 BC

Site notes
- Condition: In ruins

Aguada Fénix is a large Preclassic Maya archaeological site located in the state of Tabasco, Mexico, near the border with Guatemala. It was discovered by aerial survey using laser mapping and announced in 2020. The flattened mound is 1,400 m long (nearly a mile) and is described as the oldest and the largest known Mayan ceremonial site. The monumental structure is constructed of earth and clay, and is believed to have been built from around 1000 BC to 800 BC. It is also believed to have been abandoned in around 750 BC, shortly after its completion.

== Discovery ==
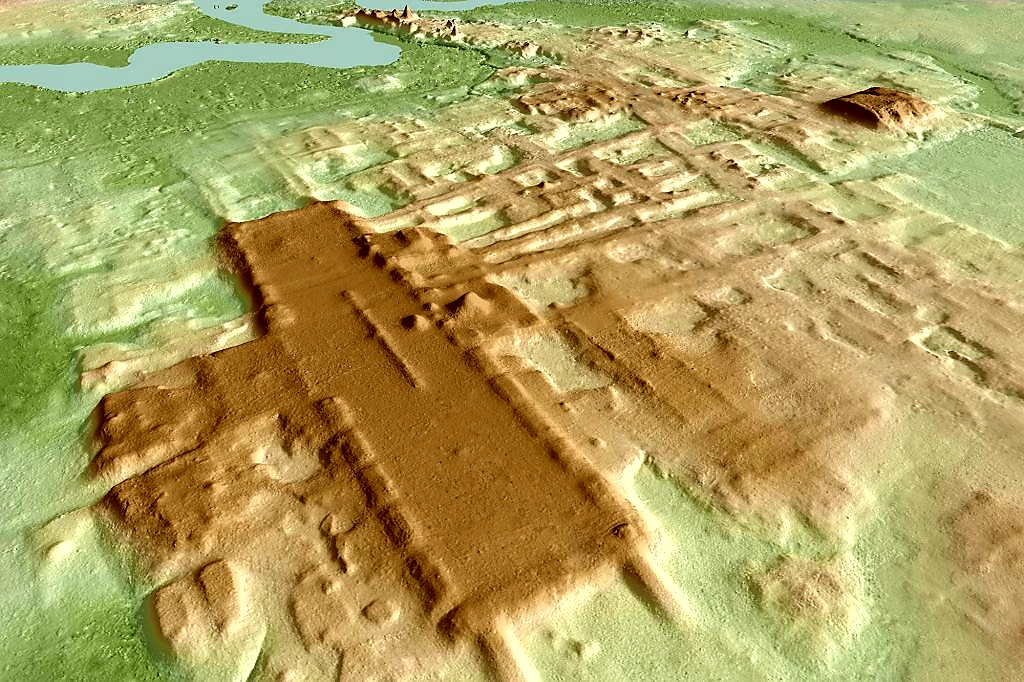
Aguada Fénix digital survey using LIDAR or laser mapping

The discovery of Aguada Fénix was announced in June 2020 by Takeshi Inomata, an archaeologist with the University of Arizona in Tucson. The site is located near the San Pedro River in northeastern Tabasco. It was initially mapped from the air using LIDAR technology deployed by the Mexican government for the entire study area of roughly 3000 km². An area of 110 km² was then selected for a higher-resolution LiDAR survey. The aerial survey revealed a total of 21 ceremonial sites in the study area, of which Aguada Fénix is the largest. After identification of the site, excavation began, resulting in insights as to when and how the Aguada Fénix structure was built and in the discovery of artifacts such as pottery and jade axes.

Archeologists mapped and excavated the site as part of the Middle Usumacinta Archaeological Project, whose purpose is to examine the relationship between the residents of the Maya lowlands and those of the Olmec region and to trace social change during the Pre-classic period. Looking at the structural designs of other major sites in the area, archeologists have concluded that the design innovations that characterise the Aguada Fénix indicate "intensive inter-regional interaction."

== Physical structure ==
The laser mapping revealed a rectangular main ceremonial structure, rising 10–15 m above the ground. It was built on top of a natural rise of bedrock and is about 1,400 m long and 400 m wide and oriented from north to south. Square wings are attached to the north-south structure, giving it a cruciform shape. Its volume (3.2-4.3 million m^{3}) is greater than that of the Great Pyramid of Giza. It was built up gradually in successive 'construction events' by adding layers of clay and other soils in a checkerboard pattern. Archeologists estimate that its construction required 10-13 million person-days of labor. It is thought to have been built by communal labor, possibly showing the importance of communal work in the initial development of Maya civilization.

Nine massive causeways and several reservoirs are components of the overall site, which currently is partially wooded and used for cattle ranching. Other, smaller structures are found in the Aguada Fénix ceremonial complex.

The large cruciform platform resembles Olmec structures at San Lorenzo and La Venta several hundred miles to the west and the Maya site of Seibal in Guatemala. Because of these similarities, archeologists believe that the pre-Columbian cultures of southern Mexico had extensive cultural exchanges.

== Artifacts ==
Deposits of shells, bones and ceramics, which appear to pre-date the construction of the ceremonial complex, were found on the bedrock. The ceramics that are contemporaneous with the construction show greater similarity with those of Maya sites than those of Olmec sites. The archeologists who excavated the site state that although "the ceramics do not necessarily indicate that the builders of Aguada Fénix were speakers of a Mayan language, they appear to have had closer cultural affinities with the Maya lowlands than with the Olmec area." This assertion is also supported by the fact that obsidian pieces found on the site were from Maya sources in Guatemala, not from the Mexican sources that supplied Olmec sites farther north.

Archeologists also hypothesise that social inequality at Aguada Fénix was less pronounced than at such Olmec sites as San Lorenzo and La Venta. This is because, so far, no sculptures of high status individuals have been found at the site, unlike at the Olmec centres. The only sculpture found at Aguada Fénix was a limestone image of an animal, possibly a white-lipped peccary or a coatimundi.

Jade axes and other symbolic objects were deposited in the center of the plateau. From this finding, archeologists surmise that the site was a ceremonial destination, probably involving large numbers of people coming from the surrounding areas. This conjecture is supported by the fact that the temple complex had no residential sections.

== See also ==
- Platform mound
