= Sayil =

Maya archaeological site in Yucatan, Mexico

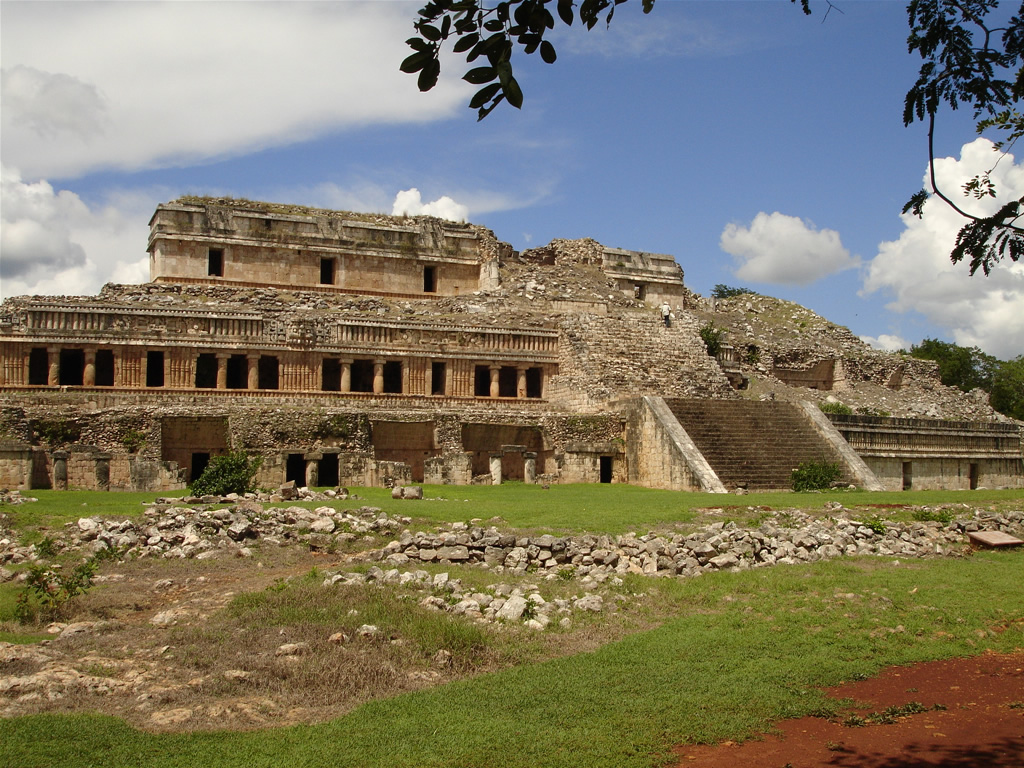
- The Grand Palace of Sayil

- Location within Mesoamerica
- 20°10′41″N 89°39′08″W
- Periods: Late Classic to Terminal Classic.
- Cultures: Maya civilization
- Location: Yucatán, Mexico
- Region: Yucatán

History
- Built: 800 AD
- Abandoned: 1000 AD

UNESCO World Heritage Site
- Official name: Pre-Hispanic Town of Uxmal
- Criteria: Cultural: i, ii, iii
- Reference: 791
- Inscription: 1996 (20th Session)

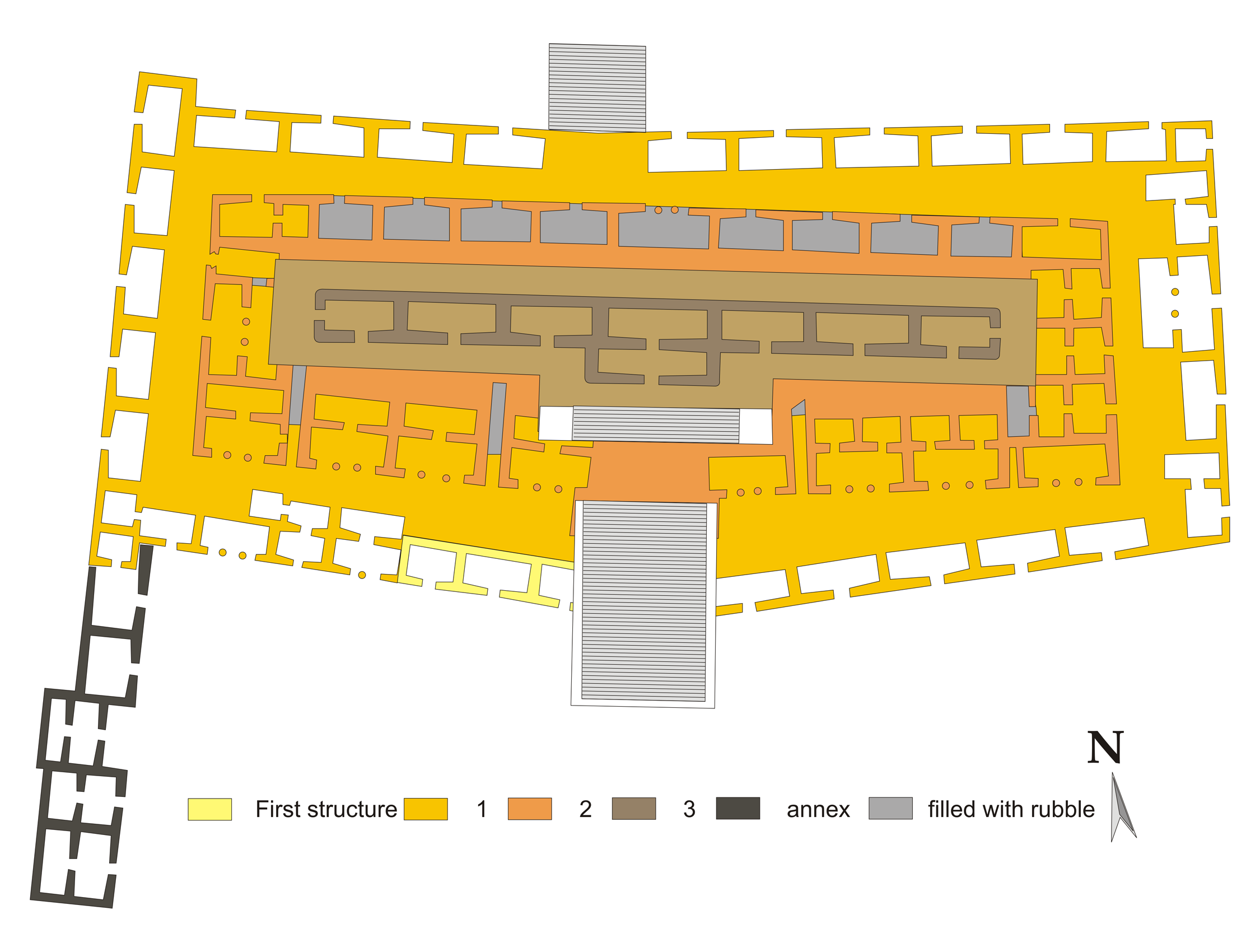
Plan of the Palace

Sayil was a pre-Columbian city built by the Maya people of the Terminal Classic period. It is located in the Mexican state of Yucatán, in the southwest of the state, south of Uxmal. Sayil, Kabah and Labna were incorporated together with Uxmal as a UNESCO World Heritage Site in 1996.

Sayil flourished principally, albeit briefly, in the Terminal Classic period. The city reached its greatest extent c. 900 and had a population of 10,000 with an additional 5,000–7,000 living in the surrounding area. A number of badly damaged monuments suggest that Sayil was governed by a local royal dynasty, with wealth among lineages based, at least in part, upon control of the best agricultural lands. The ruins of Sayil include a prominent example of monumental Puuc style architecture, the partially ruined Grand Palace of Sayil.

== Location ==
The site is located in the karst limestone hills of the Puuc region of the northern Yucatan Peninsula.

Sayil is located 7 kilometres (4.3 mi) south of the contemporary Puuc archaeological site of Kabah, 5 kilometres (3.1 mi) from in Xlapak and 5 kilometres (3.1 mi) from Labna. It was built in a shallow valley among low, steep hills.

The Puuc region that includes the site of Sayil possesses well defined wet and dry seasons and is characterised by a near absence of surface water due to the porous limestone bedrock.

== Population ==
Sayil first was settled circa AD 800, in the Late Classic Period, possibly by small Chontal warrior groups. The city reached its greatest extent c. 900, when it covered an area of approximately 5 km^{2} and had a population of perhaps 10,000 in the city itself with an additional 5,000–7,000 living in the surrounding area.

At the height of the city's occupation, the population reached the limits of the agricultural carrying capacity of the land, with crops grown in gardens and fields among the residential complexes and irrigated from artificial cisterns built to store water from the seasonal rains, and more distant fields in neighbouring valleys, probably were cultivated. Additional agricultural produce probably was supplied from nearby satellite sites.

Sayil began to decline c. 950 and the city was abandoned by c, AD 1000, a pattern of rapid growth and decline that probably was typical of the Puuc region.

Archaeologists have surveyed 2.4 km^{2} of the site, revealing an average structural density of 220 structures/km². Population estimates have been produced based on a count of structures, giving a result of 8,000–10,000 spread over an area of approximately 3.5 km^{2}. Population estimates based on a count of subterranean storage chambers known as chultuns produce a figure of 5,000–10,000. Both estimates refer to the maximum population in the Terminal Classic.

Political, economic, social, and religious leadership at Sayil appears to have been distinct and relatively decentralised. Economic rank has been analysed based on architectural scale, while political leadership was determined on the basis of the distribution of so-called altars, tall cylindrical stone features with elite associations. The distribution of religious leadership was determined by the distribution of ceramic incense vessels and social leadership by the presence of rare ceramics obtained via intercommunity social alliances.

Smaller sites around Sayil, such as Sodzil, Xcavil de Yaxche, and Xkanabi, may have been tributary communities.

== History ==
Sayil and other Puuc sites are thought to occupy an important place in the transition from Classic Period Maya culture to Postclassic society, experiencing a brief cultural florescence during the Terminal Classic, shortly after the Classic Maya collapse had depopulated the Maya lowlands. The brief occupational history of the site has raised the possibility that Sayil developed from an earlier settlement known as Chac II, a small archaeological site in the same valley that was occupied as early as the fifth century AD. Radiocarbon and obsidian hydration dating place Sayil relatively early in the Terminal Classic. Ceramic remains recovered from the Palace indicate trade with the Petén region of Guatemala during the Late Classic, and the Guatemalan origin of obsidian artifacts suggest that Classic-period trade routes were dominant when the monumental architecture at Sayil was built. Although Sayil's origins lie in the Late Classic, the Terminal Classic saw the period of most rapid expansion.

Various C-shaped structures around the Mirador Complex and the structure of the terrace of the Great Palace are evidence of continued occupation after the abandonment of the monumental structures of the site core and there was a brief period of continued occupation in the residential parts of Sayil. The primary phase of occupation at the site appears to have been 800 to 950 AD (Late to Terminal Classic) with some kind of reoccupation after the abandonment of the city.

=== Rediscovery ===
The site first was brought to the attention of the outside world by John Lloyd Stephens and Frederick Catherwood, who explored the site in 1841 and published an illustrated description in their 1843 book Incidents of Travel in Yucatán, which referred to the site under the name "Zayi". (Stephens, John Lloyd, "Incidents of Travel in Yucatan", Harper & Brothers, 1843)

== The site ==
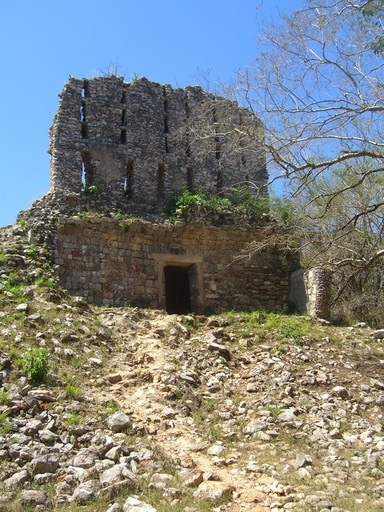
The ruined El Mirador temple

=== Archaeological investigations ===
The Mexican Instituto Nacional de Antropología e Historia carried out restoration work at Sayil in the first half of the twentieth century. Archaeologists have mapped 3.5 km^{2} of the site's urban core. Jeremy Sabloff of the University of Pennsylvania and Gair Tourtellot carried out archaeological investigations that included architectural and topographic mapping, household-scale excavation, and intensive surface collections at Sayil from 1983 to 1988, when they were affiliated with the University of New Mexico.

The site features abundant and widely distributed surface artifacts and to study the organization of the community, from 1990 to 1992, Michael P. Smyth and Christopher D. Dore conducted a systemic large-scale surface collection of artifacts at a 25-meter interval across the entire site area. Nearly 30,000 ceramic fragments were recovered (representing 99% of all artifacts recovered) and 155 lithic artifacts, of which 90% were chert with the remainder being basalt, obsidian, and limestone. The obsidian artifacts recovered from Sayil derive largely from the El Chayal source in what now is southwest Guatemala, a distant site in Mesoamerica situated in the volcanic highlands on the Pacific coast that conducted extensive trade of the material throughout Central America.

=== Site description ===
The site is laid out along a sacbe, or causeway, running from north to south. The Great Palace stands at the northern end of the causeway, it is the largest and most well known building at Sayil.

The Great Palace has an 85-meter-long facade and is built upon a two-terraced platform, giving the impression of three stories. Various rooms are arranged around the four sides of each terrace. The uppermost terrace supports a long structure with a single range of rooms. The palace was built in various phases through an unknown period of time in the Terminal Classic; wings were added and platforms were designed, which were filled with stones and mortar to increase stability. The palace has a central stairway on the south side, giving access to the upper levels of the building.

The first and second levels of the Great Palace contain substructures that were demolished to build the surviving building. The first level overlies a substructure that dates to the Late Classic.

The causeway runs south from the Great Palace to a complex located 350 metres (1,150 ft) to the south, which consists of a group of structures with multiple rooms. The building known as El Mirador is located in this complex. It is a badly damaged temple pyramid with a prominent crest, it faces southward. It consists of a half-collapsed two room building on top of a substructure. There is a phallic sculpture of unknown date near the Mirador Complex.

From the Mirador Complex another causeway runs 200 metres (660 ft) south-east, then turns south to continue to a major group containing a ballcourt and several palaces, some 2 kilometres (1.2 mi) south of the main palace. Close to the half-way point of this section of causeway there is a small platform upon which were found the remains of eight stelae and seven plain altars. This stela platform represents a type of structure common among major sites of the eastern Puuc region.

The remains of various other structures lie to both sides of the causeway system, with the majority located to the west. Structure 3B1 (Temple of the Hieroglyphic Doorway) is notable for an interior doorway decorated by a band of hieroglyphs. Structure 4B1 has a central doorway with two carved columns supporting carved capitals and three sculptured lintels. Puuc-style columns are a recurring motif at the site.

Another palace group stands on a hilltop to the north of the causeway system, overlooking the site core.

Domestic architecture at the site consisted of over 300 perishable structures built upon underlying masonry foundations, some of which have been excavated.

The site is managed by Instituto Nacional de Antropología e Historia (INAH), and is open to visitors.

=== Gallery ===
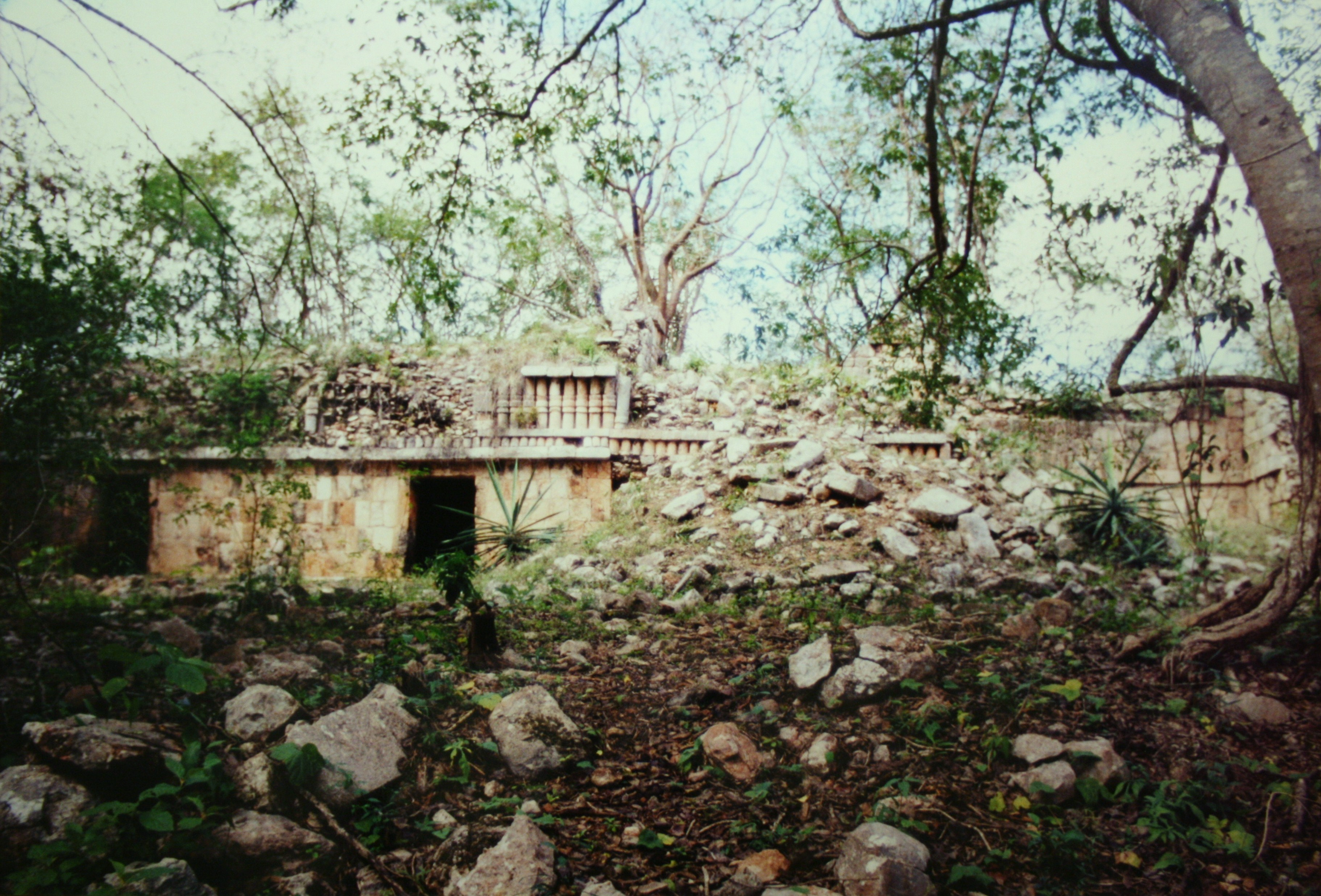
Collapsed ruins of the South Palace complex

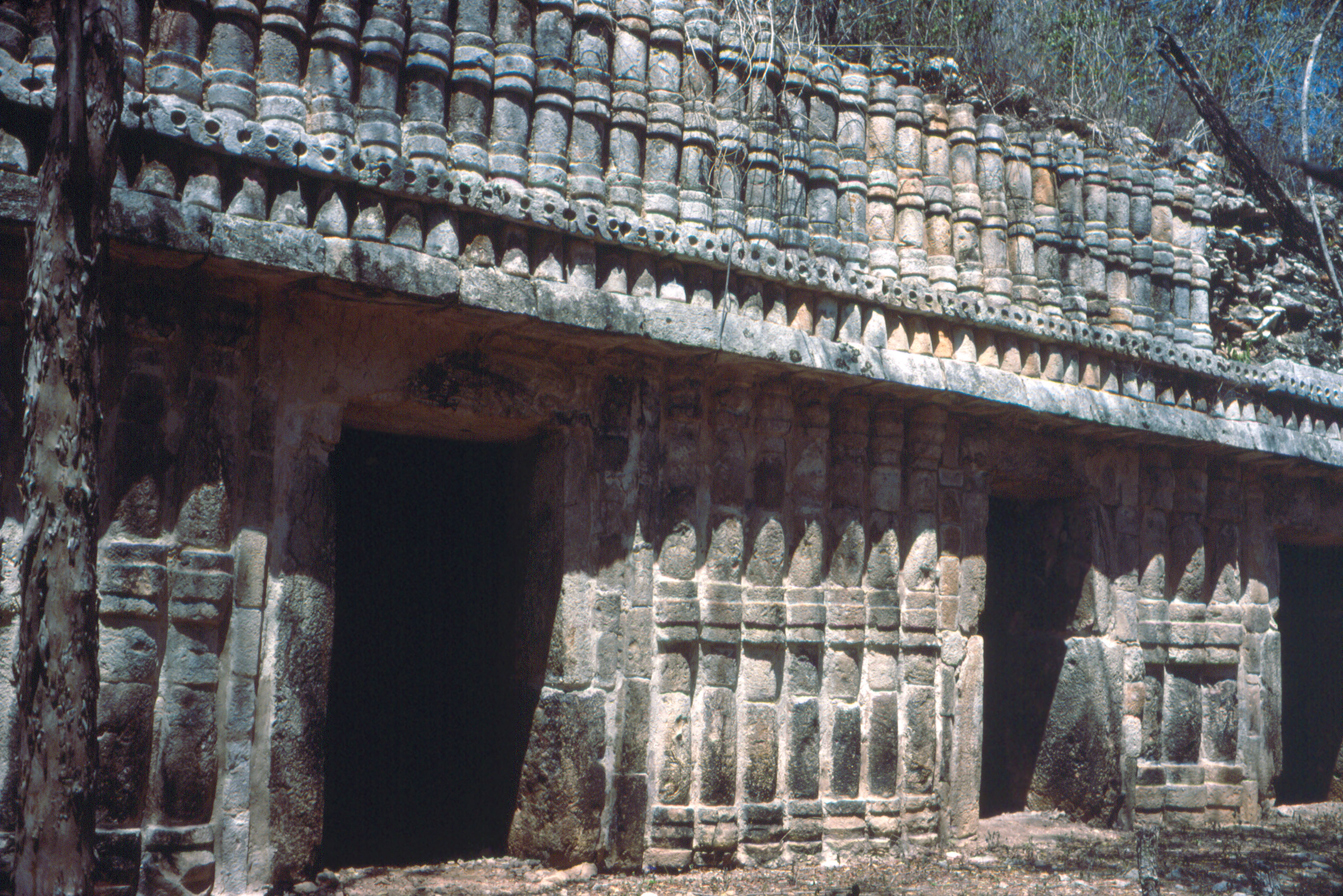
South Palace doorways

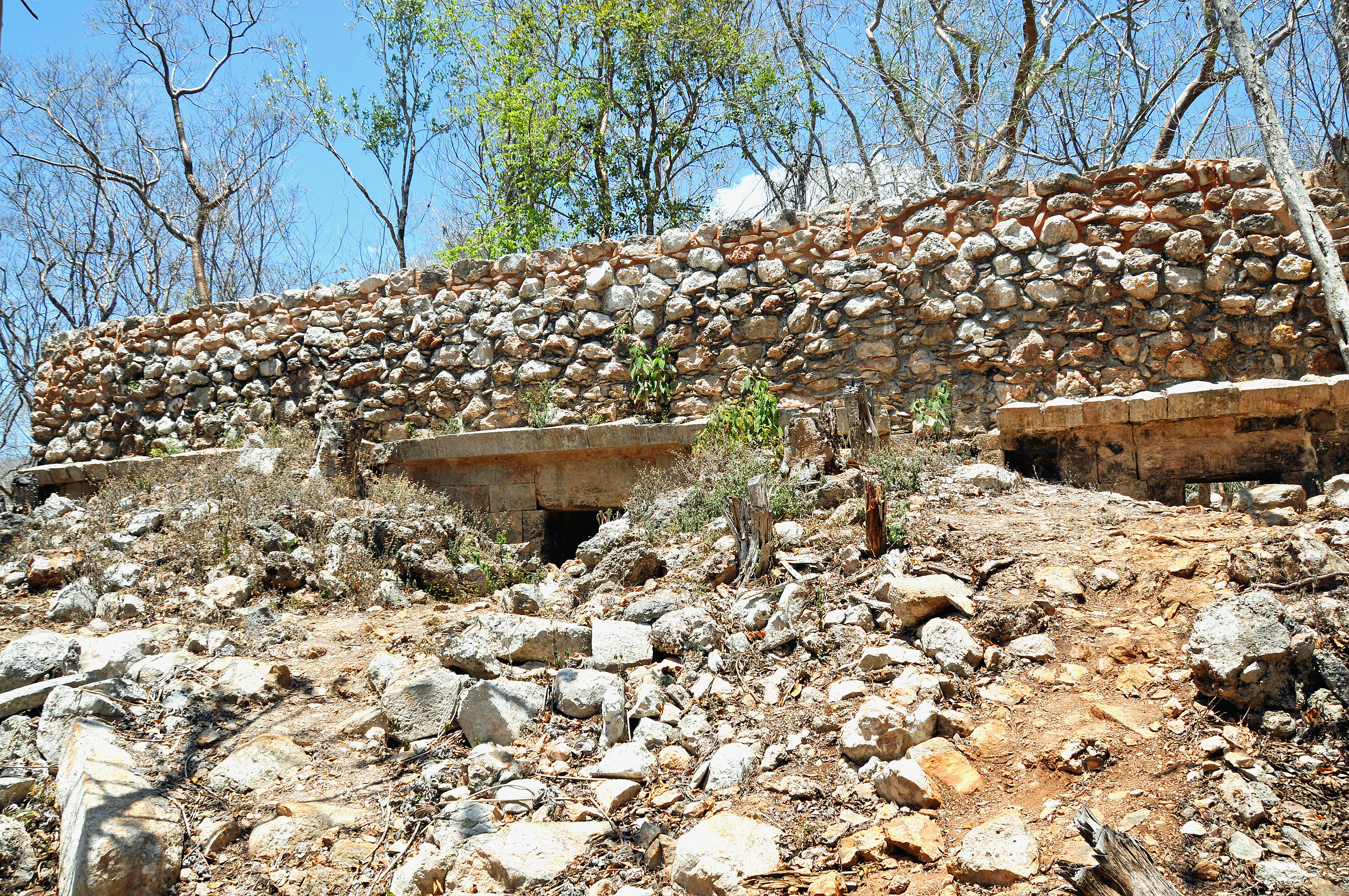
Temple of the Hieroglyphic Doorway, partially buried

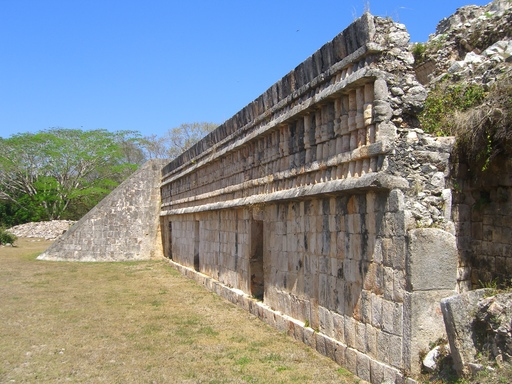
Pilasters at the Grand Palace

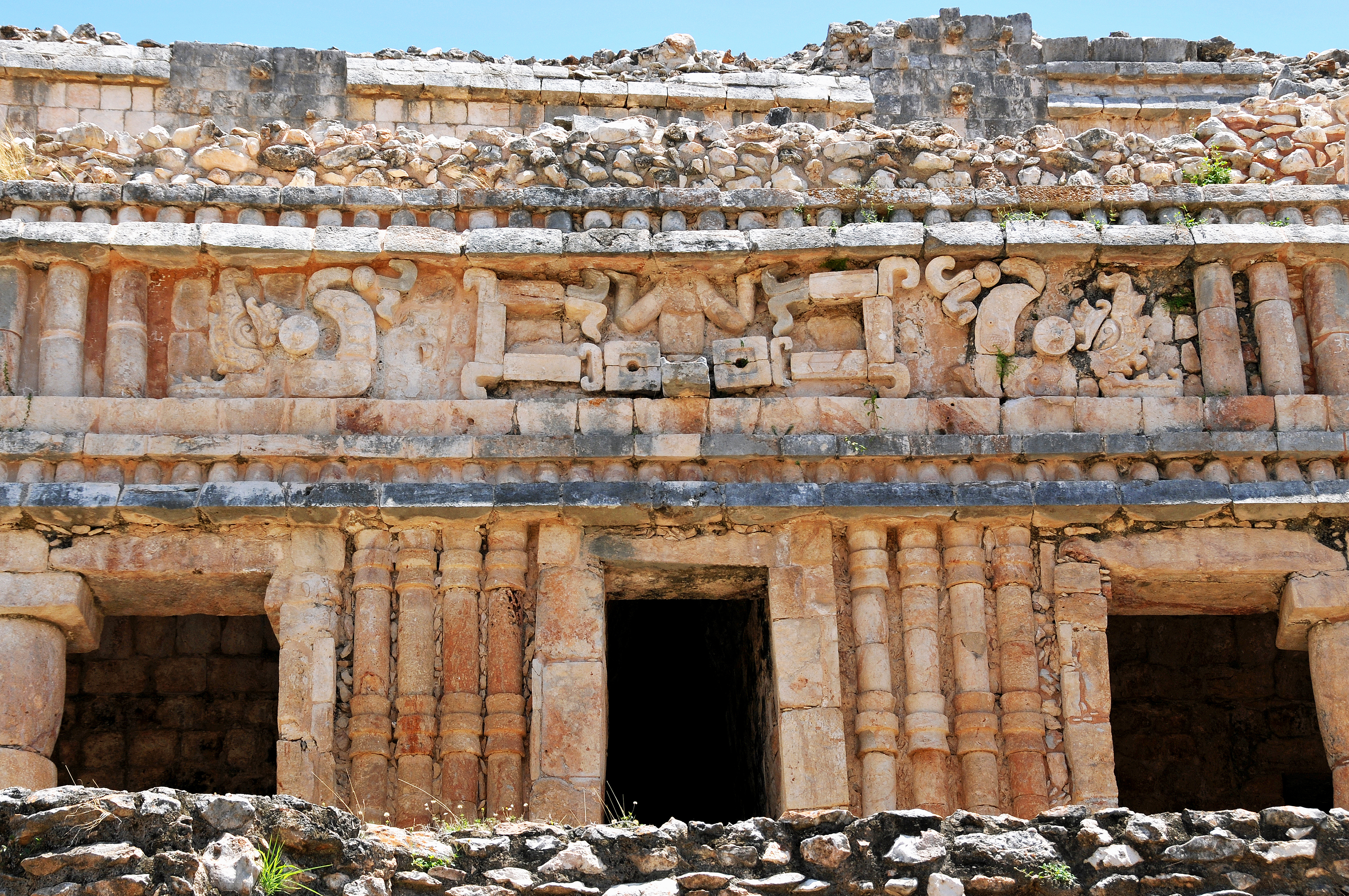
Palace façade on the second level, depicting Ah-Muzen-Cab on the doorway

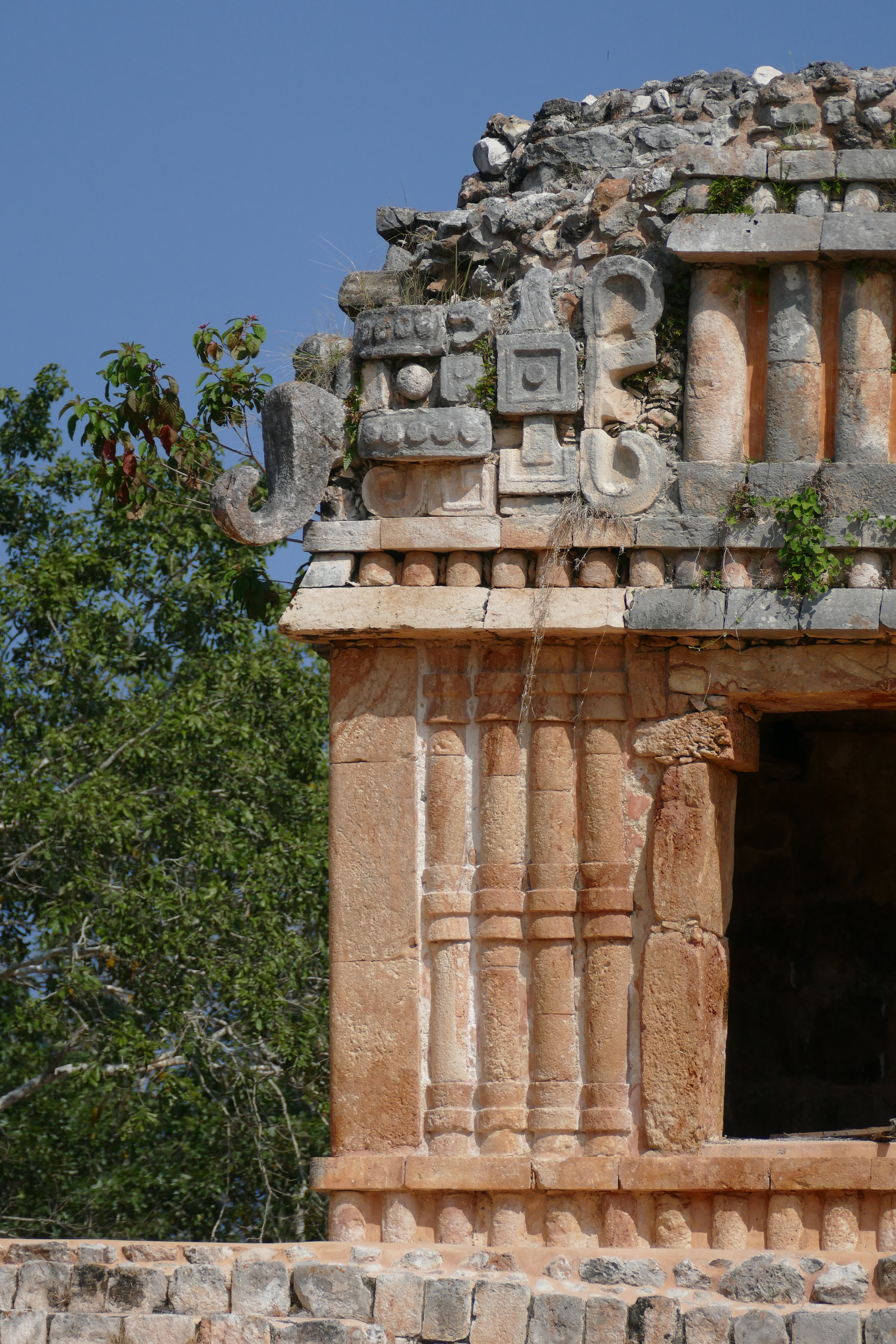
Palace façade detail - Chaac mask

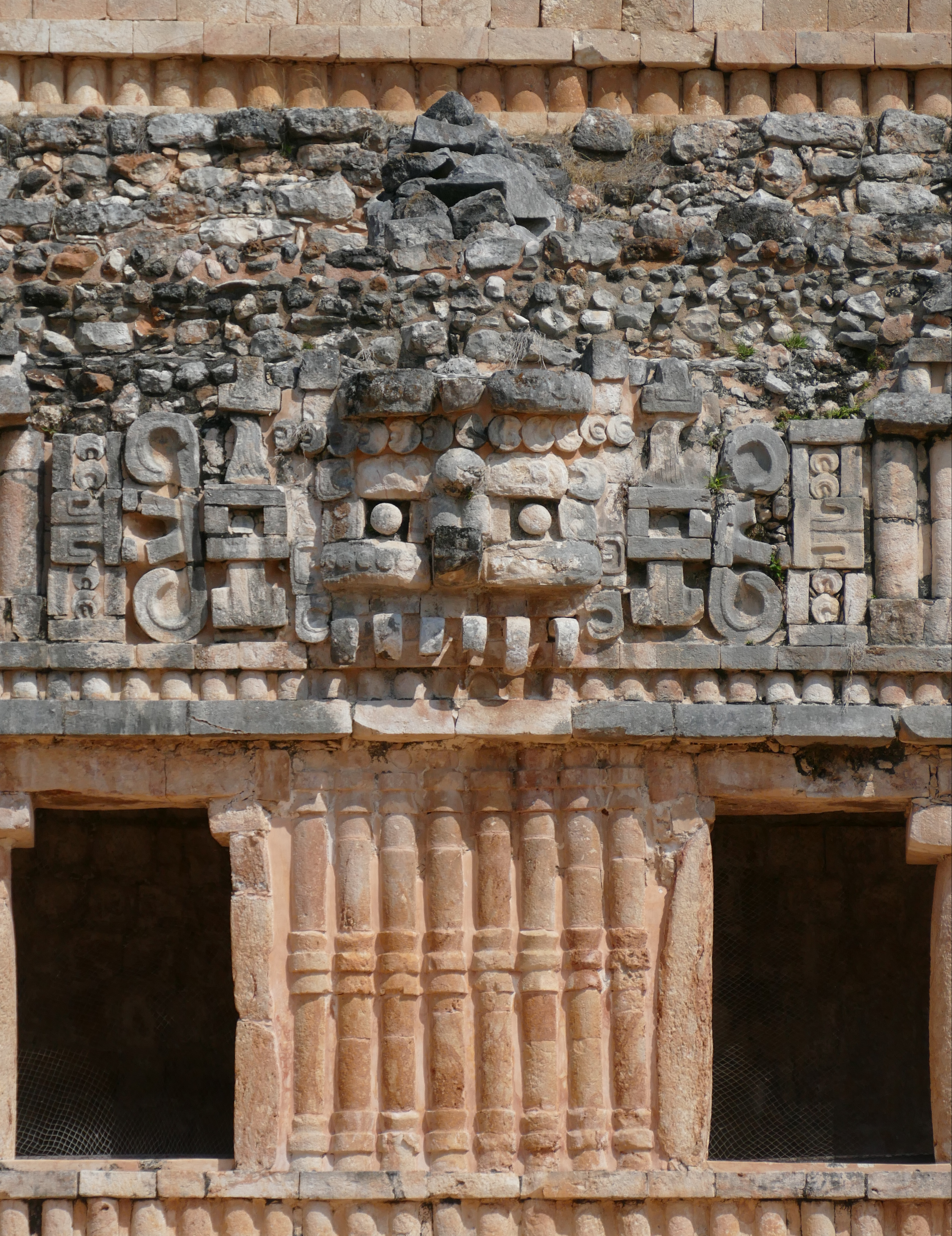

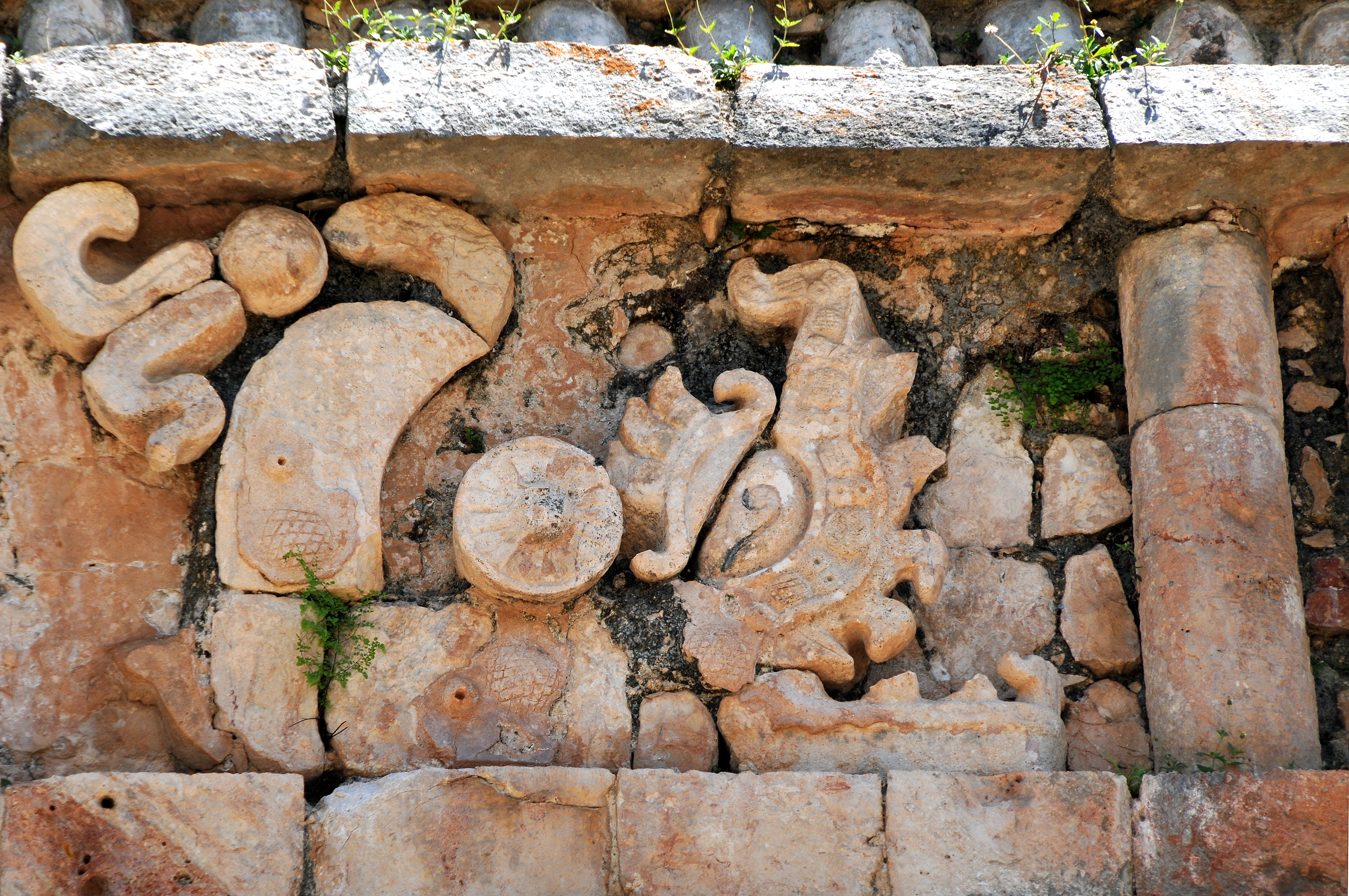
Palace façade detail - Sky Serpent

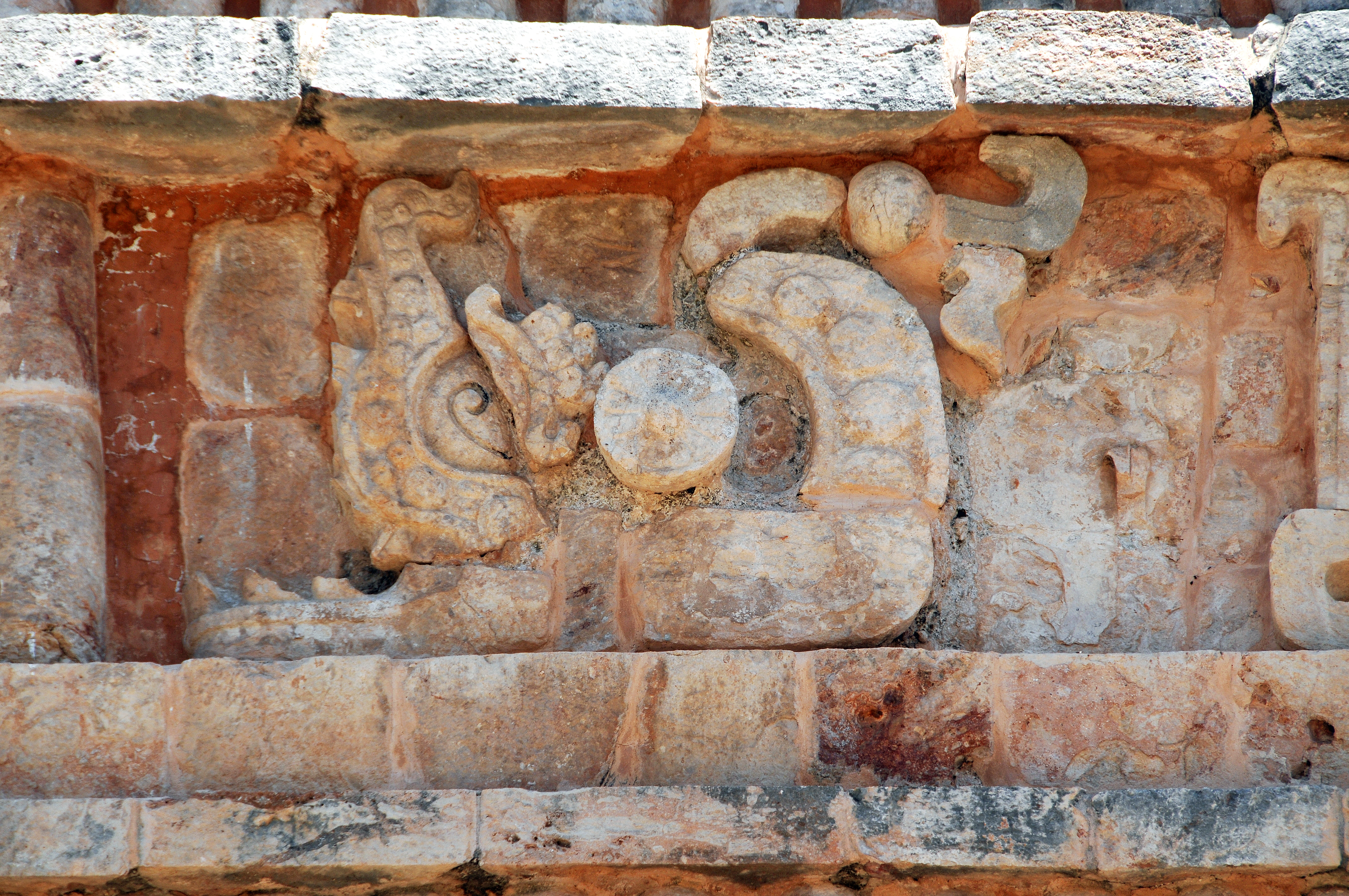

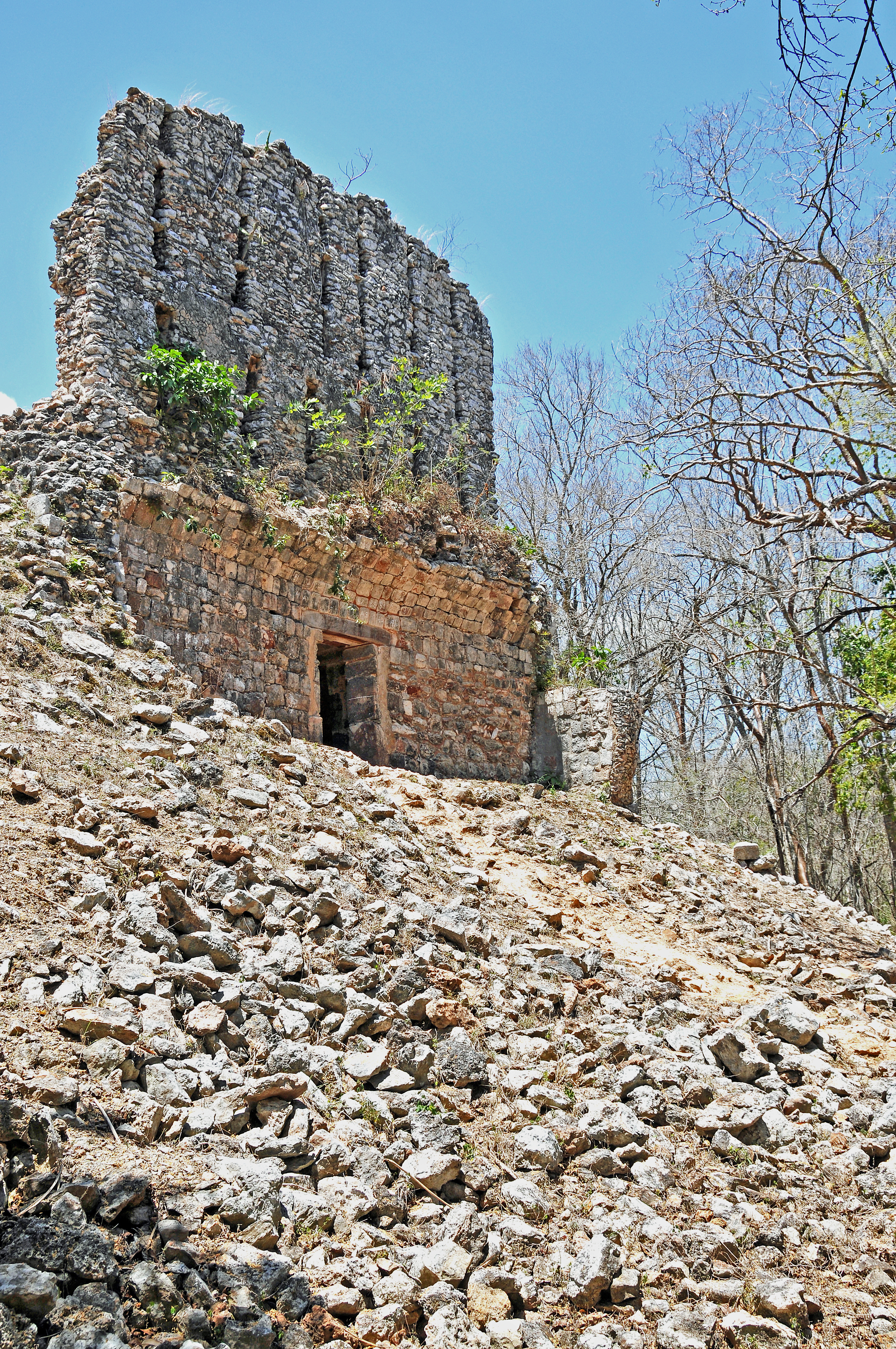
Remains of El Mirador Temple

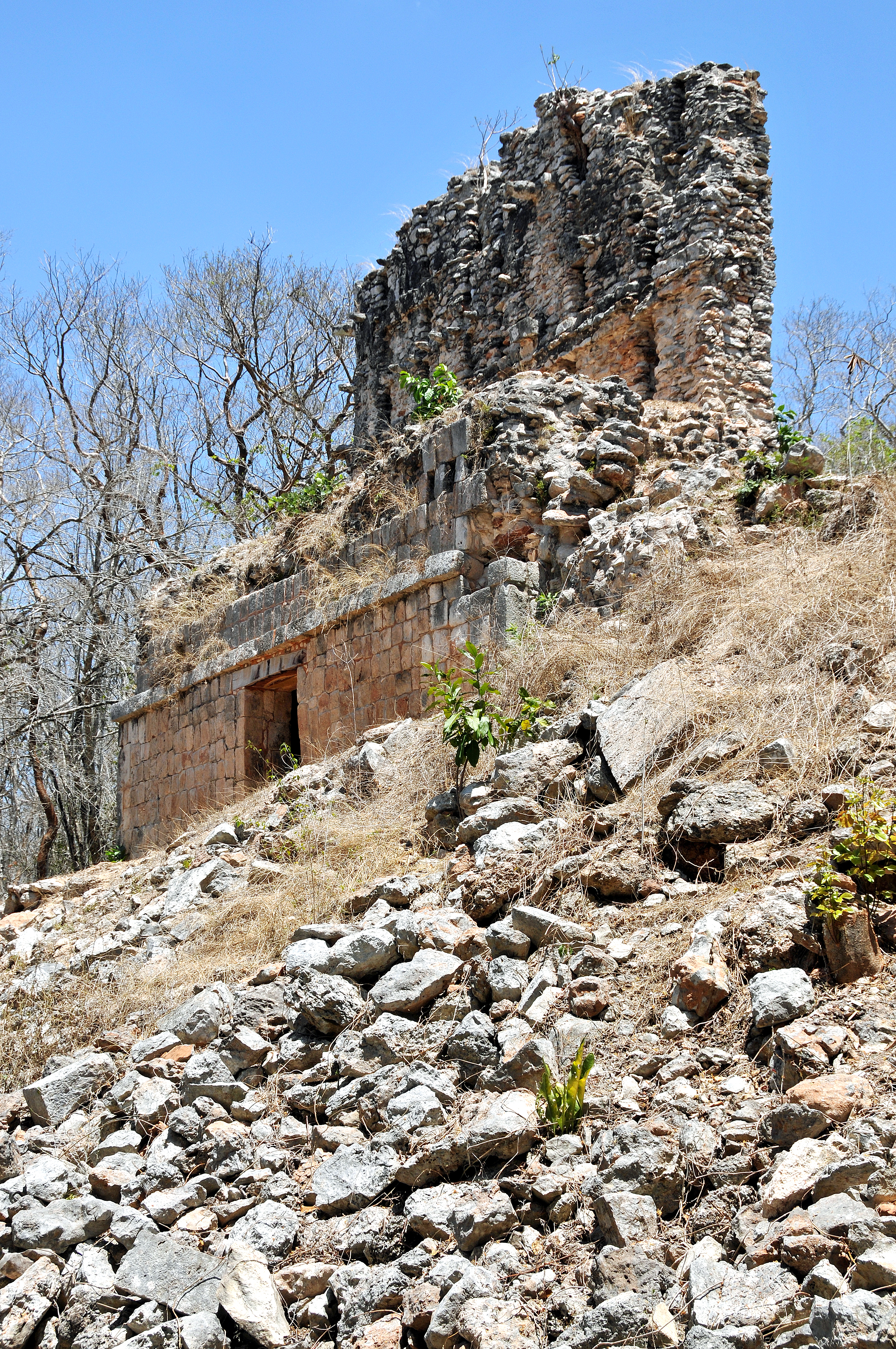

Ruins of Sayil, 1932

==== Chac II ====
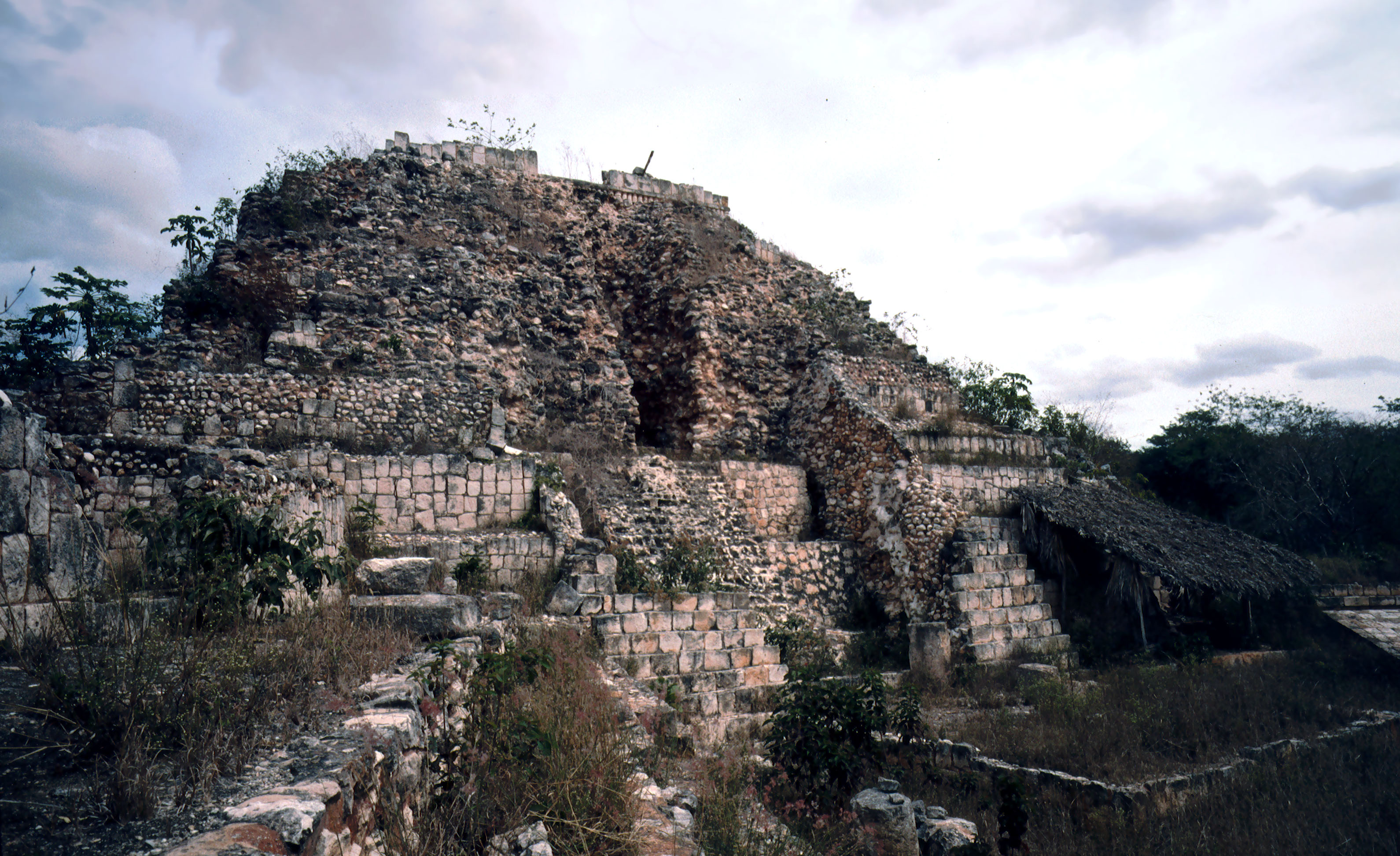
Pyramid of Chac II after excavation and partial restoration

Chac II is a small site located about 2 kilometres (1.2 mi) from the Great Palace, in the northwestern corner of the Sayil Valley. In the Terminal Classic, Chac II was a part of the greater Sayil urban area, however, Chac II predates the Terminal Classic occupation of Sayil with various dating methods (including radiocarbon, obsidian hydration, ceramic, and architectural dating) demonstrating that Chac II thrived in the Early to Middle Classic and participated in a trade network linked to the great metropolis of Teotihuacan in the distant Valley of Mexico. Chac II probably did not lose its dominance of the Sayil Valley until toward the end of the Late Classic and it is possible that Sayil was founded by the Chaac II elite, becoming a massive urban expansion of the earlier site.

=== Monuments ===
Several monuments have been dated by Tatiana Proskouriakoff based on their sculptural style, with Stela 6 dated to circa AD 810 and both Stela 3 and Stela 5 dated to a little later in the ninth century. The stelae of Sayil are Classic in style, depicting individual nobles who probably were rulers of the site, however, power in Sayil was likely to have been shared to some degree.

== See also ==
- Uxmal
