= Ancient American engineering =

Ancient American Engineering refers to early American applied scientific and mathematical knowledge used to design and build structures, machines, devices, systems and material prior to the arrival and influence of Western and Eastern Civilizations. This knowledge belonged to the Aztecs, Incas, Mayans, and Anasazi, and covered two continents.

== History ==
An analysis of Ancient American Engineering works shows that the engineers adhered strictly to two important principles: the efficient use of the resources available and the effectiveness of a project design. Of the resources available then, the tools were quite rudimentary: none of iron, some of copper and other metals, but mostly of wood and stone. Nor was there any sophisticated means of transportation - only animals for carrying cargo and, even these, only in certain regions. The manual labor, abundant when mobilized by a strong socio-political organization, produced the bulk of the work. Another abundant resource then, compared to now, was time. The construction of many ancient works seems to have been prolonged for decades, if not centuries.

=== Buildings ===
Adobe structures were constructed with bricks created from sand, clay, and water, with some fibrous or organic material, shaped using frames and dried in the sun. Stone houses, arranged in villages or towns, were built in caves or on sheer rock canyon walls. In response to the warm summer weather, they used the overhanging lip of the cliff to block off the high summer sun, so it was much cooler and more comfortable. They were built in places that were easily defensible.

The Mayan pyramids rise as high as twenty-story buildings. All of the buildings are aligned with the stars and the Solar System from precise survey points in the nearby mountain range, using an advanced understanding of mathematics, geometry and astronomy.

The City-state Tenochtitlan was connected to the mainland by causeways leading in and out of the city. These causeways were broken up by bridges that controlled the movement of foot traffic. The city was interlaced with a series of canals, so that all sections of the city could be visited either on foot or via canoe. Levees were used to control the flow of water surrounding the city. Two double aqueducts, similar to Roman aqueducts, provided the city with fresh water.

=== Irrigation ===
Ancient Americans built canals in order to irrigate crops and carry a steady supply of water to areas where water was not normally available. The canals used positioning in order to allow gravity to move the water from its source to the crops. The slopes allowed the water to travel easily and reliably to the crops in order to make sure they had the water they needed in order to flourish. The water that travelled along the canals was drawn from small streams. Crops had been planted in areas that were lower than the rivers although they were not naturally wet. This showed that the civilizations which utilized the canals were organized enough to notice their surroundings and use the geography to their advantage, rather than simply choosing random areas to plant their crops. Although the canals only date back by as much as 6,700 years, many scientists believe that there may have been an organized system of irrigation as much as 9,000 to 10,000 years ago although they feel that evidence of these very early canals will be hard to find.
