= Holmul =

Archaeological site

Coordinates: 17.300°N 89.256°W

Holmul is a pre-Columbian archaeological site of the Maya civilization located in the northeastern Petén Basin region in Guatemala near the modern-day border with Belize.

== Location ==
In spite of its relatively modest size, Holmul was important to both the Tikal and the Kaanul (Kan/"Snake") dynasties.

According to archaeologist Francisco Estrada-Belli, Holmul occupied a strategic position for both these kingdoms. Holmul lay along the best east-west route between Tikal and the coast. And it also lay on the north-south route between the Kaanul capital Dzibanche and the Guatemalan Highlands. The latter route did not pass through Tikal territory, and was very important for trade, because of the strategic materials that could be imported from there.

== Archaeological research ==
The site was first visited by an archaeological research team in 1911, led by Harvard University archaeologist Raymond Merwin. The initial work by Merwin at Holmul (later expanded by George Clapp Vaillant) produced the first stratigraphic ceramic sequence to be defined at a Maya region site. However, the results of this Peabody Museum expedition were not formally published until some twenty years afterwards, and subsequently the site remained relatively little-studied. Excavation and research at Holmul resumed only in the year 2000, as an archaeological group from Boston University, organized by Dr. Francisco Estrada Belli, began to explore the site. Shortly after its start, this archaeological project received funding from Vanderbilt University, until 2008, when Boston University took over the exploration's funding again.

== History ==
Holmul, as a city, began its existence around 800 BCE and was abandoned by 900 CE at around the time of the Classic Maya collapse. This made the city one of the longest occupied by the Maya. Holmul reached the height of its power at between 750 and 900 and may have had a considerable social influence over the many communities located in the compact area around it. The region likely influenced by Holmul is sometimes referred to as the "Holmul Domain".

One archaeological site located near Holmul, called La Sufricaya, includes painted murals which seem to suggest some degree of foreign involvement in the Holmul Domain. Foreigners in the region may have been from Teotihuacan, or possibly from Tikal. This could have drastic implications for traditional understanding of the relationship between the Maya and the people of Teotihuacan, especially between the years 300-550 CE.

In 2013, a building from about 600 CE was found with a large stucco frieze showing a central ruler and two flanking ones in repose. Below the frieze runs a long inscription from which it appears that the construction (which contains a staircase burial) was commissioned by king Ajwosaj of Naranjo, a city on the Holmul River. Naranjo was subordinated to the Kaan(ul/al) dynasty of Dzibanche and Calakmul. The latter kingdom was a main rival to Tikal.

Because of Holmul's status as one of the last Mayan cities to be abandoned, archaeologists are interested in walls built around the city during its last years of habitation. Walls also exist around another city in the Holmul Domain, called Cival, and could suggest the possibility of a final siege near the time of the collapse of the two cities, although the real implications of the structures are unknown.

== Holmul ceramic style ==
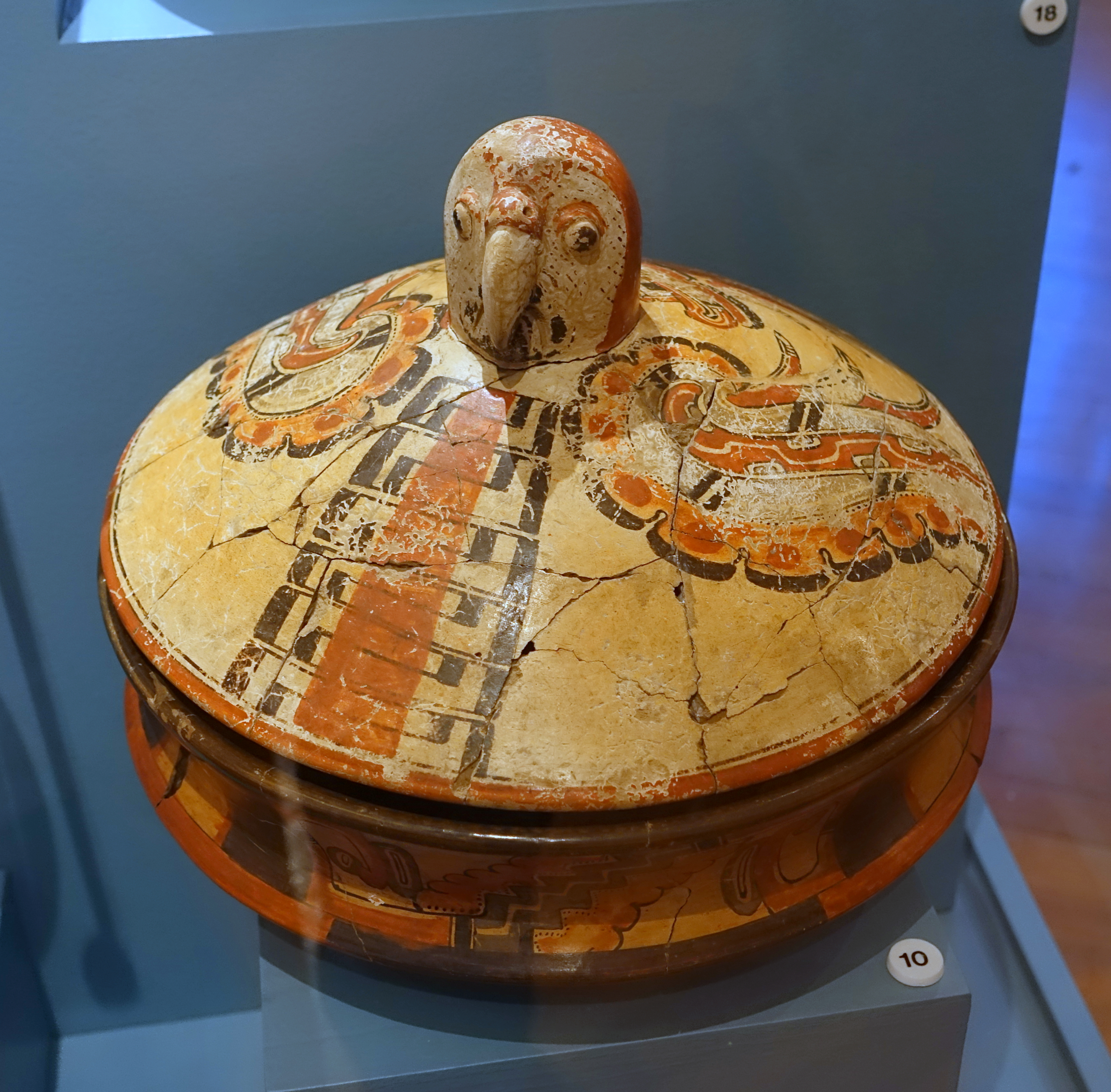
Dish with parrot effigy lid, Holmul, Group II, Building B, Early Classic

The name of Holmul is also attached to a Late-Classic ceramic art style associated with the wider Holmul-Naranjo region, and characterized by a red and orange palette on a cream background; its predominant theme is that of the so-called 'Holmul dancer', that is, the Tonsured Maize God, shown as a dancer with a ceremonial back rack.

== See also ==
- K'o
