= Naranjo =

Maya archaeological site

- Wak Kab'nal
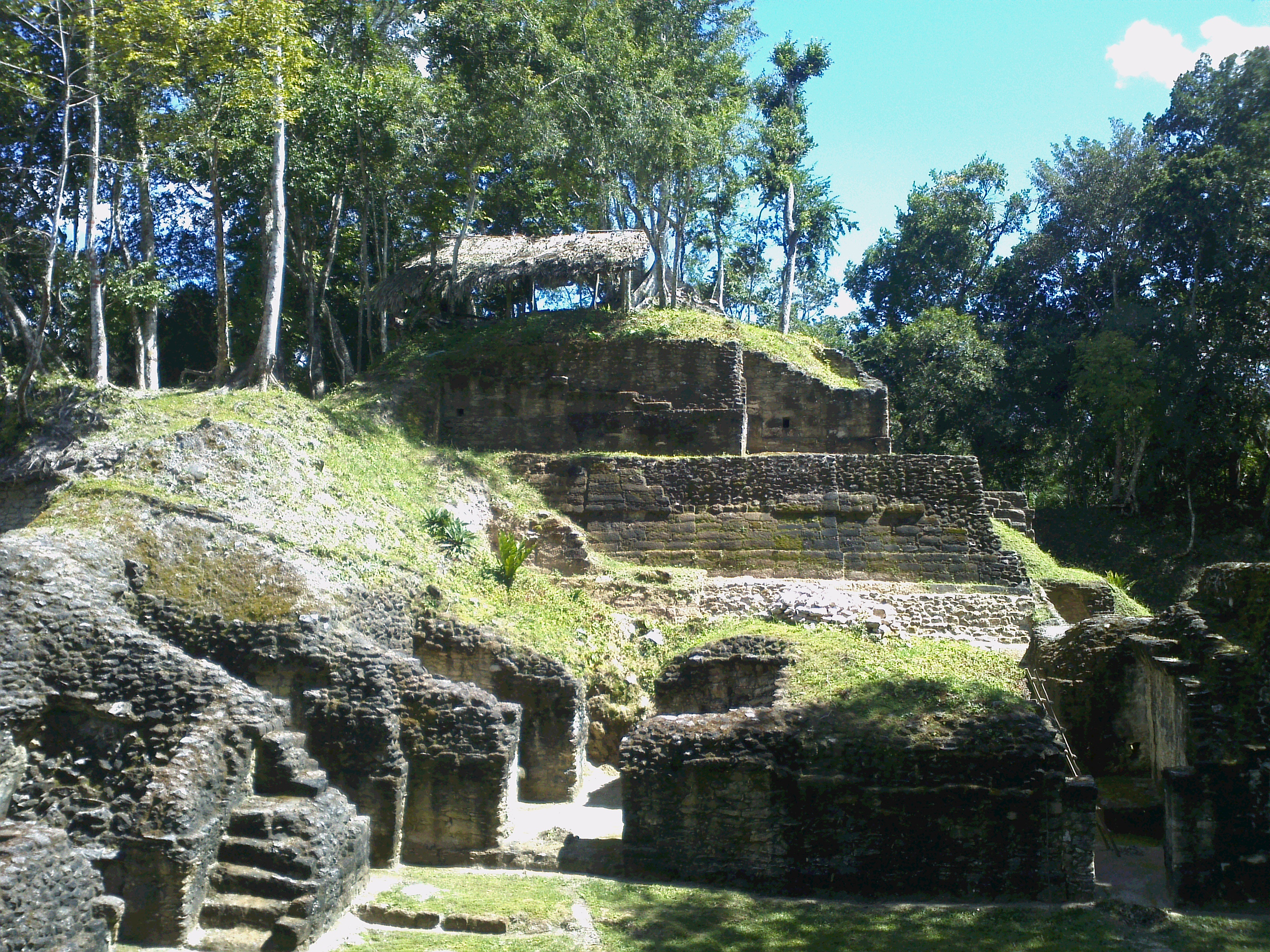
- View of Naranjo

- Location of the site Naranjo (Guatemala)
- 17°08′0.95″N 89°15′43.81″W
- Type: Settlement
- Periods: Middle Preclassic to Early Postclassic
- Cultures: Maya civilization
- Location: Petén Department, Guatemala
- Region: Petén Basin

Site notes
- Condition: In ruins

Naranjo (Wak Kab'nal in Mayan) is a Pre-Columbian Maya city in the Petén Basin region of Guatemala. It was occupied from about 500 BC to 950 AD, with its height in the Late Classic Period. The site is part of Yaxha-Nakum-Naranjo National Park. The city lies along the Mopan and Holmul rivers, and is about 50 km east of the site of Tikal. Naranjo has been the victim of severe looting. The site is known for its polychrome ceramic style.

The emblem glyph of the Naranjo is transliterated as Sa'aal “the place where (maize) gruel abounds.” The Naranjo dynastic rulers are said to be the "Holy Lords of Sa'aal."

== Layout of site ==
The area of Naranjo covers at least 8 km^{2} with the urban center covering about 2.25 km^{2}. There are currently 389 recorded buildings in the central area and over 900 around the center.

The epicenter consists of six triadic complexes, two ballcourts, two palace compounds, and one E-group. C-9 is the largest triadic complex in the city. Structure C-9 is the complexes main pyramid, and the Largest at the site. Because it occupies the top of a natural hill with a cave located inside, it is a perfect place to be categorized as a ‘sacred mountain’.

A hieroglyphic stairway, that is believed to have been taken from Caracol, was added to structure B-18 sometime in the seventh century AD.

== Hydrogeology and Lowland Seasonal Wetland Dynamics ==
The site core of Naranjo is strategically situated on an elevated karstic plateau flanked by the floodplains of the Mopan River and Holmul River drainage basins. Because the central core lacks direct perennial river access, urban sustainment relied on an integrated network of modified seasonal bajos, artificial water reservoirs (aguadas), and plastered masonry cisterns (chultunes) engineered to store monsoon runoff for the dry season.

- Holmul-Mopan Catchment Mechanics: The peripheral wetlands acted as a hydrologic buffer, absorbing riverine floods during the rainy season and creating fertile, self-enriching vertisol soils that supported intensive agriculture (reflecting the ancient toponym Sa'aal, "the place where maize gruel abounds").
- Karst Aquifer Mineralogy: Stratigraphic excavations in the central epicentral plazas and surrounding depressions reveal thick deposits of fine-grained clay siltation, recording topsoil wash caused by Middle and Late Classic urban expansion and terrace construction across the ridge.
- Terminal Classic Drought Hydrology: Isotopic and geoarchaeological analyses across the central Petén lowlands indicate prolonged rainfall deficits around 810 AD, which depleted the city's central reservoirs, severed agricultural production in the seasonally inundated bajos, and contributed to the ultimate abandonment of the epicentral royal compounds.

== Archaeological preservation work ==
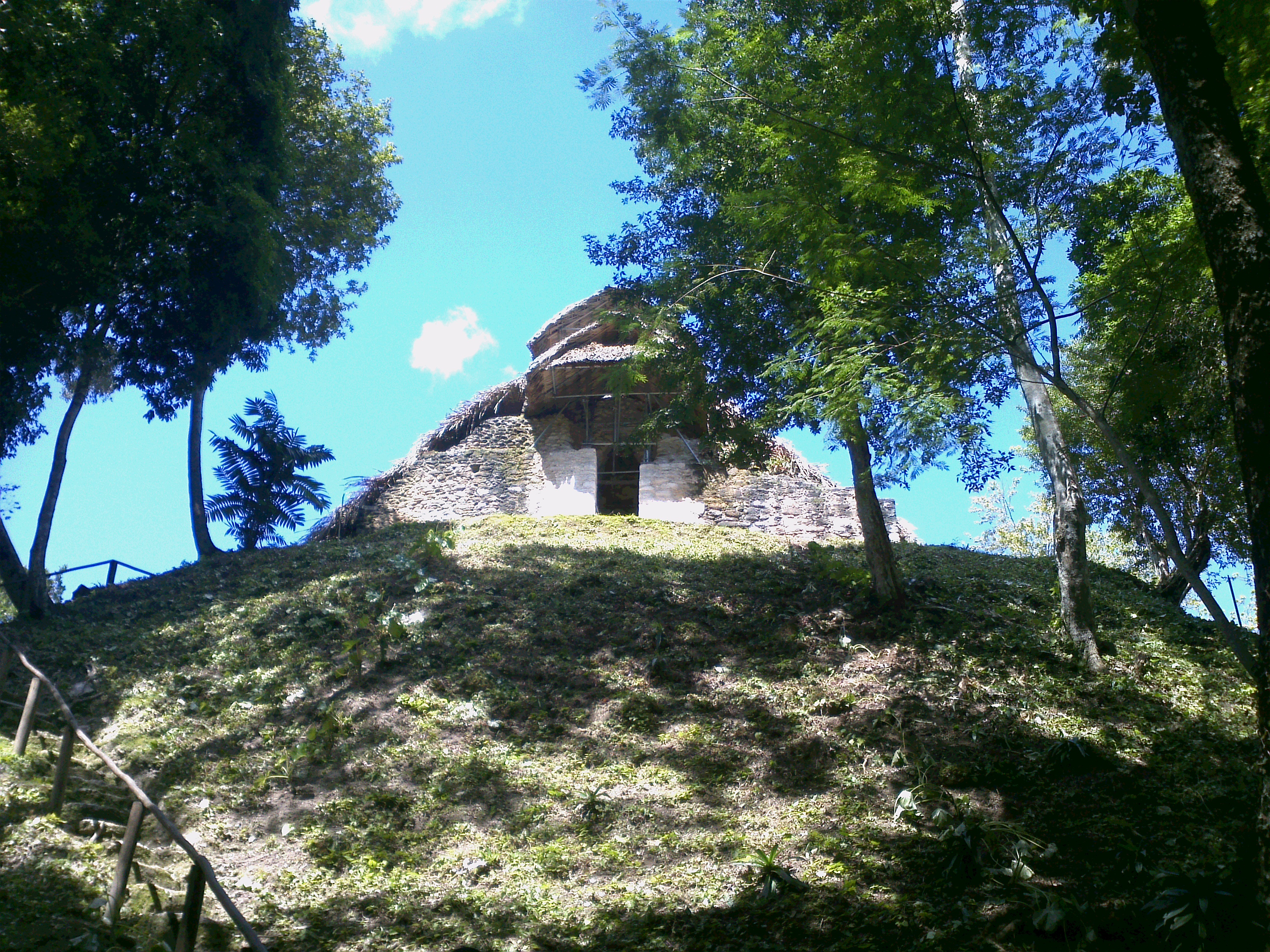
View of Naranjo

The site was first mapped and photographed by Teoberto Maler in 1905, who was sent by The Peabody Museum of Harvard University. In 1908 Maler excavated the hieroglyphic stairway from structure B-18, parts of which are now housed in the British Museum in London. In the 1910s, further investigations of the site were made by Sylvanus G. Morley and Oliver Ricketson.

Investigations of the site of Xunantunich suggests that it was part of Naranjo's realm.

By the 1920s, many of the ancient sculptures had already disappeared. The problem worsened in the 1960s, when many of the site's large sculptures were smashed into fragments by looters in order to sneak them out of the country.

In 1972-1973, 19 stela were taken from Naranjo by the Department of Prehispanic Monuments of the IDAEH to be protected from looters.

From 1997 to 2001 the site was controlled by looters. From 2002 to 2004, a project was undertaken to evaluate the extent of the looting which found about 270 tunnels and trenches. Archaeologist Vilma Fialko has been instrumental in this project.

A conservation project by the Ministry of Culture and Sport began in 2002. In 2006 Naranjo was added to the World Monuments Watch.

In 2013, a building from about 600 AD was found at nearby Holmul with a giant stucco frieze showing a central ruler and two flanking ones in repose. The frieze is very well preserved. Below it runs a long inscription from which it appears that the construction was commissioned by Aj Wosal of Naranjo. At the time, Naranjo was subordinated to the Kaanul dynasty of Dzibanche and Calakmul.

== History ==
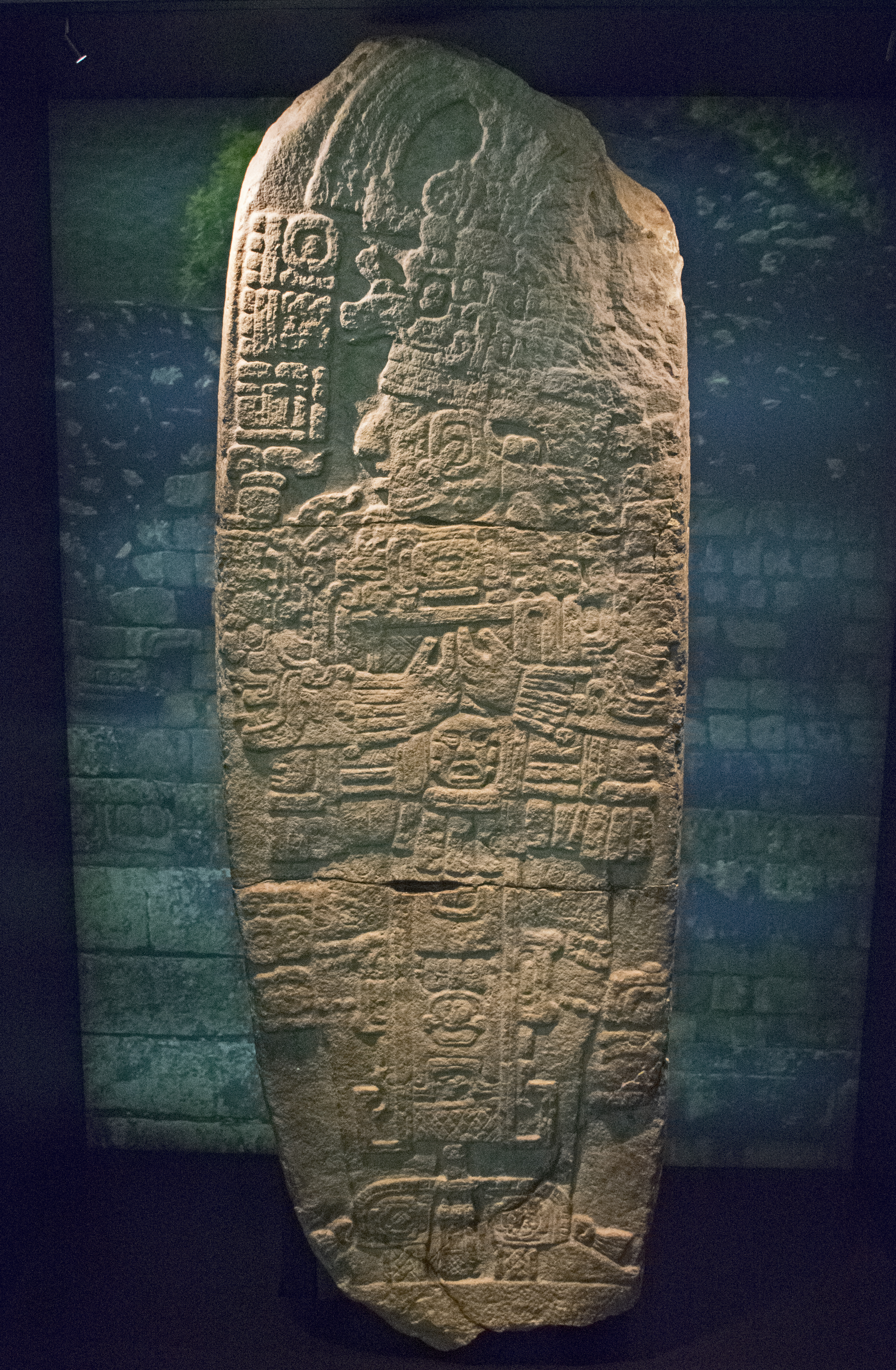
Stela 8, showing the inauguration of Kʼahkʼ Ukalaw Chan Chaahk in 755. MUNAE, Guatemala City.

The history of Naranjo includes several major disturbances in the dynastic rule when allegiances and identities of local kings were subject to change. Texts at the site record a mythical founding of the city by its patron god.

Not much is known about the site before the ruler Ah Wosaaj Chan Kʼinich who came to power in 546 AD. The sites of La Sufricaya and Holmul to the north of Naranjo were involved in the establishment of the new political order in Peten after the arrival of Sihyaj K’ahk' in AD 378. It is plausible to assume that Naranjo might also be under the sway of Sihyaj Kʼahk's hegemony and later Tikal rulers. If there were any monuments from that time, they were destroyed and/or cached.

In 546 AD Naranjo came under the control of Calakmul whose ruler Tuun Kab Hix appointed Ah Wosaaj Chan Kʼinich. This was a deliberate move by Calakmul to take allies away from Tikal. Ah Wosaaj was involved in infrastructure improvements to the city such as the paving of a road in July 559, according to Altar 2.

In 626 two attacks were made on Naranjo by Caracol. Naranjo was then retaken by Calakmul in 631. During the administration of K'ahk' Xiiw Chan Chaahk, Naranjo defeated Caracol in a "star war" sending Caracol into a hiatus period, but by 680 Caracol had apparently recovered and eliminated K'ahk' Xiiw.

In 682 AD, Calakmul sent Wak Chanil Ajaw (Lady Six Sky), possibly Ix Wak Chan Jalam Lem in ancient Maya, to reestablish the Naranjo dynasty. Her arrival is written on Stela 24 found in front of Structure C-7. Lady Six Sky was the daughter of the Dos Pilas ruler Bʼalaj Chan Kʼawiil. While never officially made a ruler, Lady Six Sky performed as a ruler, possibly as regent for her son Kʼakʼ Tiliw Chan Chaak who acceded in 693 AD at the age of five. This relationship is made explicit on Naranjo Stela 46. Between 693 and 698 AD Naranjo carried out a series of at least eight attacks, likely under the auspices of Lady Six Sky, defeating Tikal in 695 AD and Ucanal in 698 AD. K'ak' Tiliw Chan Chaak began another series of attacks in 706 AD including the defeat of Yaxha in 710 AD. Lady Six Sky died in 741 AD. She is depicted on stelae including 3, 18, 24, 29, and 31.

Naranjo was defeated by Tikal in 744 AD and the ruler, Yax Mayuy Chan Chaak, was taken captive and likely sacrificed during Tikal's victory celebrations. However, this wasn't the end of the city's written history. Later kings include Itzamnaaj? K'awiil, who fought against Yaxha and, in 790, repaved the road established by Ah Wosaaj, according to Altar 2.

Naranjo's final abandonment may have been the result of political turmoil and a severe drought dated to 810 AD.

== Known rulers ==
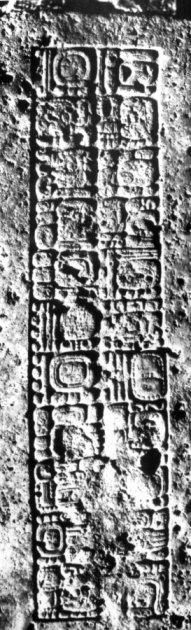
Inscription relating to the reign of king Itzamnaaj? K'awil, 784-810.

== References and sources ==
Sources

- Lothrop, S. K. (1941). "A Chronological Link Between Maya and Olmeca Art". American Anthropologist. 43 (3): 419–421. doi:10.1525/aa.1941.43.3.02a00050.
- Morley, Sylvanus G (1909). "The Inscriptions of Naranjo, Northern Guatemala". American Anthropologist. 11 (4): 543–562. doi:10.1525/aa.1909.11.4.02a00020.
- Rice, Don S.; Prudence, M. (1980). "The Northeast Peten Revisited". American Antiquity. 45 (3): 432–454. doi:10.2307/279858. JSTOR 279858. S2CID 164080107.
