= Holmul River (Guatemala) =

River in Guatemala

- Native name: Río Holmul (Spanish)

Location
- Country: Guatemala
- Department: El Petén

Physical characteristics
- Source
  - location: El Petén
  - coordinates: 17.015112°N 89.614878°W
  - elevation: 400 m (1,300 ft)
- Mouth
  - coordinates: 17.297805°N 89.213963°W
  - elevation: 200 m (660 ft)

The Holmul River (Spanish: Río Holmul) is a river in northeastern Guatemala that flows through the Petén Basin region in the departamento (department) of El Petén towards the border with Belize. A number of significant pre-Columbian Maya sites lie along or near the course of this waterway, including Tikal, Nakum, Holmul, Naranjo, Yaxha and Witzna.
