= List of kings of Dos Pilas =

This is a ʼʼʼlist of kings of Dos Pilasʼʼʼ, a Pre-Columbian site of the Maya civilization located in what is now Petén Department, Guatemala.

This is also a list of Dos Pilas consorts.

Name	Image	Parents	Consort(s)	Children
Bʼalaj Chan Kʼawiil		King and queen of Tikal	Lady of Itzan; Lady Buluʼ	Itzamnaaj Bʼalam; Itzamnaaj Kʼawiil; Wak Chanil Ajaw
Itzamnaaj Bʼalam		Bʼalaj Chan Kʼawiil; Lady of Itzan	?	?
Itzamnaaj Kʼawiil		Bʼalaj Chan Kʼawiil; Lady of Itzan	unknown	Kʼawiil Chan Kʼinich?
Uchaʼan Kʼin Bʼalam		unknown	GI-Kʼawiil of Cancuén	?
Kʼawiil Chan Kʼinich		Itzamnaaj Kʼawiil	?	?
