= 741 =

Calendar year

741 in various calendars
Gregorian calendar	741; DCCXLI
Ab urbe condita	1494
Armenian calendar	190; ԹՎ ՃՂ
Assyrian calendar	5491
Balinese saka calendar	662–663
Bengali calendar	147–148
Berber calendar	1691
Buddhist calendar	1285
Burmese calendar	103
Byzantine calendar	6249–6250
Chinese calendar	庚辰年 (Metal Dragon); 3438 or 3231 — to — 辛巳年 (Metal Snake); 3439 or 3232
Coptic calendar	457–458
Discordian calendar	1907
Ethiopian calendar	733–734
Hebrew calendar	4501–4502
- Hindu calendars
Vikram Samvat	797–798
Shaka Samvat	662–663
Kali Yuga	3841–3842
Holocene calendar	10741
Iranian calendar	119–120
Islamic calendar	123–124
Japanese calendar	Tenpyō 13 (天平１３年)
Javanese calendar	635–636
Julian calendar	741; DCCXLI
Korean calendar	3074
Minguo calendar	1171 before ROC 民前1171年
Nanakshahi calendar	−727
Seleucid era	1052/1053 AG
Thai solar calendar	1283–1284
Tibetan calendar	ལྕགས་ཕོ་འབྲུག་ལོ་ (male Iron-Dragon); 867 or 486 or −286 — to — ལྕགས་མོ་སྦྲུལ་ལོ་ (female Iron-Snake); 868 or 487 or −285

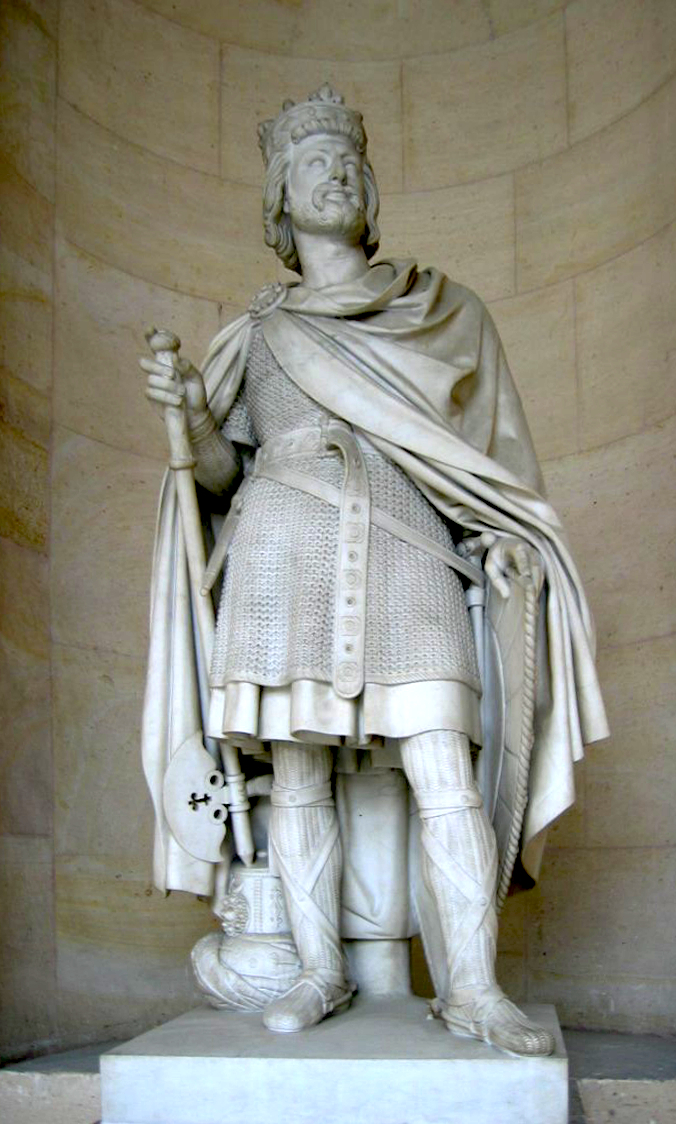
Statue of Charles Martel (c. 688–741)

Year 741 (DCCXLI) was a common year starting on Sunday of the Julian calendar. The denomination 741 for this year has been used since the early medieval period, when the Anno Domini calendar era became the prevalent method in Europe for naming years.

== Events ==
=== By place ===
==== Byzantine Empire ====
- June 18 – Emperor Leo III ("the Isaurian") dies of dropsy at Constantinople, after a 24-year reign that has saved the Byzantine Empire and delivered Eastern Europe from the threat of an Arab conquest. He is succeeded by his son Constantine V.
- Artabasdos, Byzantine general (strategos) of the Armeniac theme, defeats Constantine V and advances on Constantinople, where he is crowned emperor. He secures the support of the themes of Thrace and Opsikion, and abandons Leo's religious policy of iconoclasm. Constantine seeks the support of the Anatolic theme.

==== Central America ====
- February 11 – Wak Chanil Ajaw (Lady Six Sky), queen of the Mayan city state of Naranjo in Guatemala, dies after a reign of more than 47 years and is succeeded by her son, Yax Mayuy Chan Chaak, who reigns until his own death in 744.
- June 23 – Kʼawiil Chan Kʼinich becomes the new ruler of the Mayan city state at Dos Pilas in Guatemala after the death of Ucha'an K'in B'alam and reigns until 761 when he is forced to flee during an uprising by rebels from Tamarindito.

==== Europe ====
- October 22 – Charles Martel, Merovingian mayor of the palace, dies in his palace at Quirzy-sur-Oise (modern-day Picardy). His territories are divided between his adult sons Carloman and Pepin the Short, although the Frankish Kingdom has had no true king since the death of Theuderic IV (see 737). Lands to the east, including Austrasia and Alemannia (with Bavaria as a vassal) go to Carloman, while Pepin receives Neustria and Burgundy (with Aquitaine as a vassal). Grifo, youngest son of Charles, succeeds him as mayor of the palace, and probably receives a strip of land between Neustria and Austrasia.
- Pepin the Short marries Bertrada of Laon, daughter of Count Charibert of Laon.

==== Switzerland ====
- In 741 and 744, documents in the archives of St. Gallen Abbey describe the village of Kempraten as Centoprato, another document in 863 as Centiprata, inspired by the Latin name Centum Prata. ^{(Unclear significance)}
- A nunnery given by the Alamannic noblewoman Beata on Lützelau island is first mentioned. In 744, the nunnery is sold to Einsiedeln Abbey. ^{(Unclear significance)}
- Ufenau island in Switzerland is first mentioned in 741 as "Hupinauia", and in 744 as "Ubinauvia" — island of Huppan of Huphan. ^{(Unclear significance)}

==== Africa ====
- The Great Berber Revolt: Caliph Hisham ibn Abd al-Malik appoints Kulthum ibn Iyad al-Qasi as governor (wali) of Ifriqiya (North Africa). A fourth expedition is sent from Syria by the Umayyad Caliphate to crush the rebellion in the Atlas region, but is defeated at the Battle of Bagdoura, in the plain of the Ghrab (modern Morocco). The counter-attack of the Kharijite rebels to the East is successful, but fails to conquer Kairouan from the loyalists. A more radical branch of the Tunisian Kharijites, (the Sufrists) however, manages to take the city soon after.

=== By topic ===
==== Religion ====
- November 28 – Pope Gregory III dies at Rome, after a 10-year reign. He is succeeded by Zachary, as the 91st pope of the Catholic Church.
- April 23 – A fire destroys the English city of York Minster, including its Church. The church is later rebuilt as a more impressive structure, containing thirty altars.
- Japanese authorities decree that Buddhist temples should be established throughout the country (approximate date).

== Births ==
- Amalberga of Temse, Lotharingian nun and saint (d. 772)
- Sugano no Mamichi, Japanese nobleman (d. 814)
- Tassilo III, duke of Bavaria (approximate date)

== Deaths ==
- February 10 or 11 - Lady Six Sky, Maya queen of Naranjo
- March 28 – Hatsusebe, Japanese princess
- June 18 – Leo III, emperor of the Byzantine Empire
- October 22 – Charles Martel, Frankish statesman and founder of the Carolingian dynasty
- November 28 – Gregory III, pope of the Catholic Church
- Habib ibn Abi Obeida al-Fihri, Arab general
- Hedan II, duke of Thuringia (approximate date)
- Kulthum ibn Iyad al-Qasi, Arab governor
- Theodoald, mayor of the palace of Austrasia
