= Lady Buluʼ =

- Queen consort of Dos Pilas
- Spouse: King Bʼalaj Chan Kʼawiil
- House: Royal house of Dos Pilas (by marriage)
- Religion: Maya religion

Lady Buluʼ (7th-century) was a Queen consort of Dos Pilas. (Her name may have also been Lady B'uluka'l.) She was the wife of Bʼalaj Chan Kʼawiil, king of Dos Pilas. She was the mother of Naranjo queen Wak Chanil Ajaw and stepmother of Dos Pilas kings Itzamnaaj Bʼalam and Itzamnaaj Kʼawiil.

Despite not being the king's first wife, she likely carried a high level of political power; she is described on Naranjo Stela 24 as an ochk'in kalo'mte' (loosely, "western autocrat"). This term was typically only associated with high-ranking nobility.

It is also possible that she had one more daughter.

The main wife of Bʼalaj Chan Kʼawiil was Lady of Itzan.
