= 648 =

Calendar year

648 in various calendars
- Gregorian calendar: 648; DCXLVIII
- Ab urbe condita: 1401
- Armenian calendar: 97; ԹՎ ՂԷ
- Assyrian calendar: 5398
- Balinese saka calendar: 569–570
- Bengali calendar: 54–55
- Berber calendar: 1598
- Buddhist calendar: 1192
- Burmese calendar: 10
- Byzantine calendar: 6156–6157
- Chinese calendar: 丁未年 (Fire Goat); 3345 or 3138 — to — 戊申年 (Earth Monkey); 3346 or 3139
- Coptic calendar: 364–365
- Discordian calendar: 1814
- Ethiopian calendar: 640–641
- Hebrew calendar: 4408–4409
- Hindu calendars
- Vikram Samvat: 704–705
- Shaka Samvat: 569–570
- Kali Yuga: 3748–3749
- Holocene calendar: 10648
- Iranian calendar: 26–27
- Islamic calendar: 27–28
- Japanese calendar: Taika 4 (大化４年)
- Javanese calendar: 539–540
- Julian calendar: 648; DCXLVIII
- Korean calendar: 2981
- Minguo calendar: 1264 before ROC 民前1264年
- Nanakshahi calendar: −820
- Seleucid era: 959/960 AG
- Thai solar calendar: 1190–1191
- Tibetan calendar: མེ་མོ་ལུག་ལོ་ (female Fire-Sheep); 774 or 393 or −379 — to — ས་ཕོ་སྤྲེ་ལོ་ (male Earth-Monkey); 775 or 394 or −378

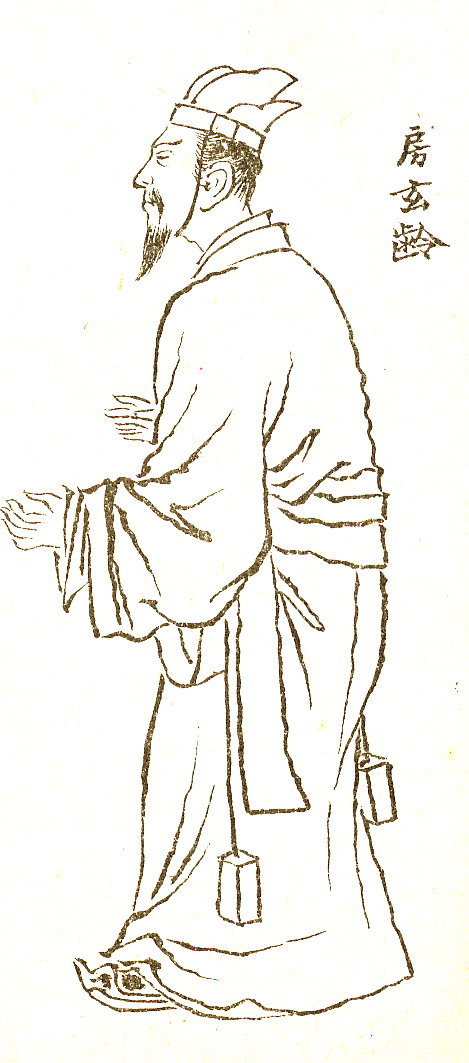
Fang Xuanling (579–648)

Year 648 (DCXLVIII) was a leap year starting on Tuesday of the Julian calendar. The denomination 648 for this year has been used since the early medieval period, when the Anno Domini calendar era became the prevalent method in Europe for naming years.

== Events ==
=== By place ===
==== Byzantine Empire ====
- Emperor Constans II issues an imperial edict forbidding Monothelitism to be discussed, to quiet the intense controversy caused by the Monothelete doctrine. This edict, distributed by patriarch Paul II in Constans' name, is known as the Typos.

==== Europe ====
- King Sigebert III of Austrasia is advised by Remaclus to establish a double-monastery, at Stavelot and Malmedy. As a missionary bishop, he founds an abbey on the River Amblève (modern Belgium).

==== Britain ====
- King Cenwalh of Wessex returns from a 3-year exile in East Anglia, to reclaim his kingdom. He gives 3,000 hides of land around Ashdown to his nephew Cuthred, possibly sub-king of Berkshire (England).
- Cenwahl invites bishop Birinus to establish under his direction the Old Minster in Winchester. Together they have a small stone church built.

==== Asia ====
- Tang general Ashina She'er re-establishes Tang control of Karasahr, and leads a military campaign against the Tarim Basin kingdom of Kucha in Xinjiang, a vassal of the Western Turkic Khaganate.

==== Americas ====
- In an early skirmish in the run up to the Second Tikal–Calakmul War, Bʼalaj Chan Kʼawiil scores a military victory, apparently over his half-brother, who had galled him by using the same royal emblem (or emblem glyph) as he did.
- Dos Pilas breaks away from Tikal and becomes a vassal state of Calakmul.

=== By topic ===
==== Literature ====
- The Book of Jin is compiled in China during the Tang dynasty. Its chief editor is the chancellor Fang Xuanling, who dies in this year as well.

==== Religion ====
- Pope Theodore I excommunicates Paul II of Constantinople.

== Births ==
- Kōbun, emperor of Japan (d. 672)
- Radbod, king of Frisia (d. 719)
- Tōchi, Japanese princess (d. 678)

== Deaths ==
- Fang Xuanling, chancellor of the Tang dynasty (b. 579)
- John III of the Sedre, Syriac Orthodox Patriarch of Antioch.
- Ma Zhou, chancellor of the Tang dynasty (b. 601)
- Xiao, empress of the Sui dynasty
