= 672 =

Calendar year

672 in various calendars
Gregorian calendar	672; DCLXXII
Ab urbe condita	1425
Armenian calendar	121; ԹՎ ՃԻԱ
Assyrian calendar	5422
Balinese saka calendar	593–594
Bengali calendar	78–79
Berber calendar	1622
Buddhist calendar	1216
Burmese calendar	34
Byzantine calendar	6180–6181
Chinese calendar	辛未年 (Metal Goat); 3369 or 3162 — to — 壬申年 (Water Monkey); 3370 or 3163
Coptic calendar	388–389
Discordian calendar	1838
Ethiopian calendar	664–665
Hebrew calendar	4432–4433
- Hindu calendars
Vikram Samvat	728–729
Shaka Samvat	593–594
Kali Yuga	3772–3773
Holocene calendar	10672
Iranian calendar	50–51
Islamic calendar	51–53
Japanese calendar	Hakuchi 23 (白雉２３年)
Javanese calendar	563–564
Julian calendar	672; DCLXXII
Korean calendar	3005
Minguo calendar	1240 before ROC 民前1240年
Nanakshahi calendar	−796
Seleucid era	983/984 AG
Thai solar calendar	1214–1215
Tibetan calendar	ལྕགས་མོ་ལུག་ལོ་ (female Iron-Sheep); 798 or 417 or −355 — to — ཆུ་ཕོ་སྤྲེ་ལོ་ (male Water-Monkey); 799 or 418 or −354

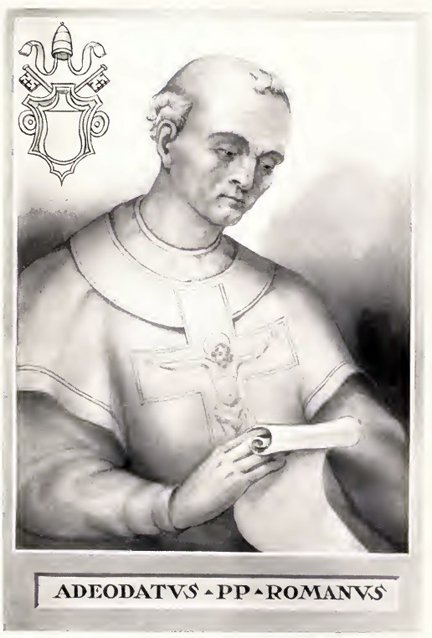
Pope Adeodatus II (672–676)

Year 672 (DCLXXII) was a leap year starting on Thursday of the Julian calendar. The denomination 672 for this year has been used since the early medieval period, when the Anno Domini calendar era became the prevalent method in Europe for naming years.

== Events ==
=== By place ===
==== Europe ====
- Wamba succeeds Recceswinth as king of the Visigoths. After ascending to the throne he faces a revolt from Hilderic, governor of Nîmes, who has himself aspired to the kingship. He is supported by Gumild, bishop of Maguelone. Wamba sends dux Paulus to Septimania (Southern France) to end the hostilities, but on his arrival at Narbonne, Paulus proclaims himself king.

==== Britain ====
- King Cenwalh of Wessex dies after a 31-year reign, in which he has lost much of his territory to Welsh and Mercian forces. He is succeeded by his widow Seaxburh. His sub-kings divide Wessex amongst themselves (approximate date).

==== Asia ====
- January 7 – Emperor Tenji dies after a 10-year reign, in which he has given the Fujiwara clan its name. Following his death, there ensues a succession dispute between Tenji's 14 children (many by different mothers). He is succeeded by his favorite son Kōbun, age 23, who was the first accorded with the title Daijō-daijin.
- August 21 – Kōbun is deposed after 8 months, during a brief but violent battle called the Jinshin War. He is succeeded by his uncle Ōama, who becomes the 40th emperor of Japan with support from the Fujiwara family. He takes the name Tenmu, and begins a reign that will continue until 686.

==== Americas ====
- As part of the Second Tikal–Calakmul War, Bʼalaj Chan Kʼawiil is again forced to abandon Dos Pilas, after it is attacked by an insurgency led by Nuun Ujol Chaak against Calakmul.

=== By topic ===
==== Literature ====
- Cædmon, Anglo-Saxon poet, writes a nine-line hymn on the Creation. A onetime illiterate herdsman, he becomes a monk under the rule of Hilda of Whitby, where he will turn various biblical themes into vernacular poetry (approximate date).

==== Religion ====
- January 27 – Pope Vitalian dies at Rome after a reign of more than 14 years. He is succeeded by Adeodatus II as the 77th pope.
- Máel Ruba, Irish abbot, founds one of the first Christian monasteries in Applecross (Scotland) located in hostile Pictish territory.
- Wilfrid, bishop of York, brings stonemasons, plasterers and glaziers from France and Italy to build Ripon Cathedral (England).

== Births ==
- Bede, Anglo-Saxon theologian and historian (approximate date)
- Chilperic II, king of the Franks (approximate date)
- Yazid ibn al-Muhallab, Muslim governor (d. 720)

== Deaths ==
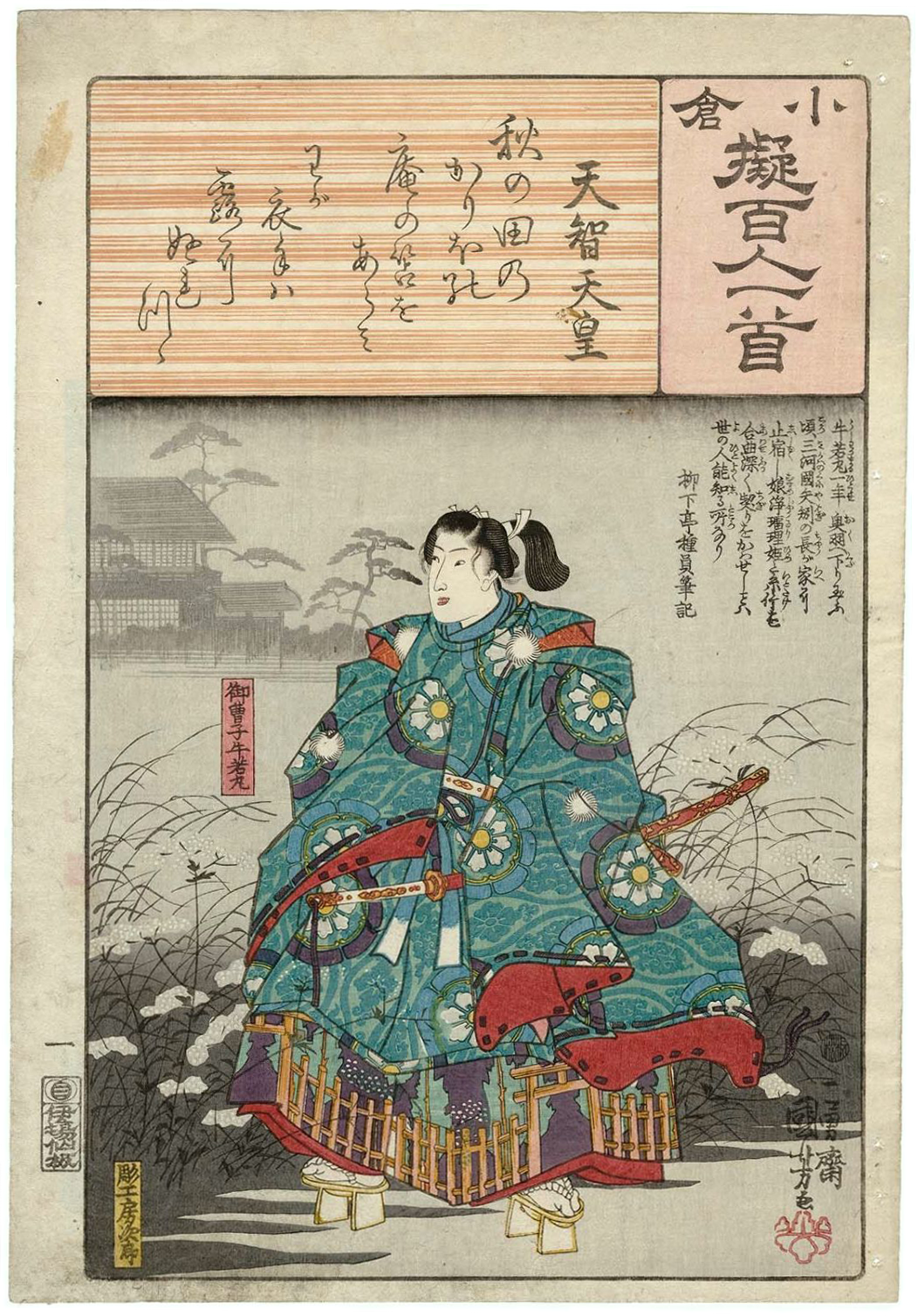
Emperor Tenji

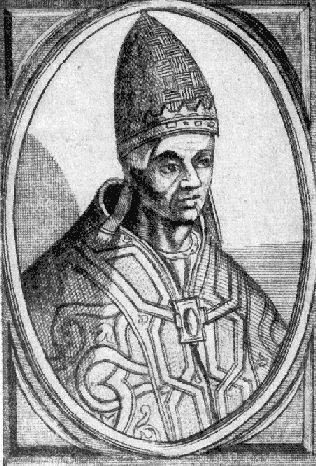
Pope Vitalian

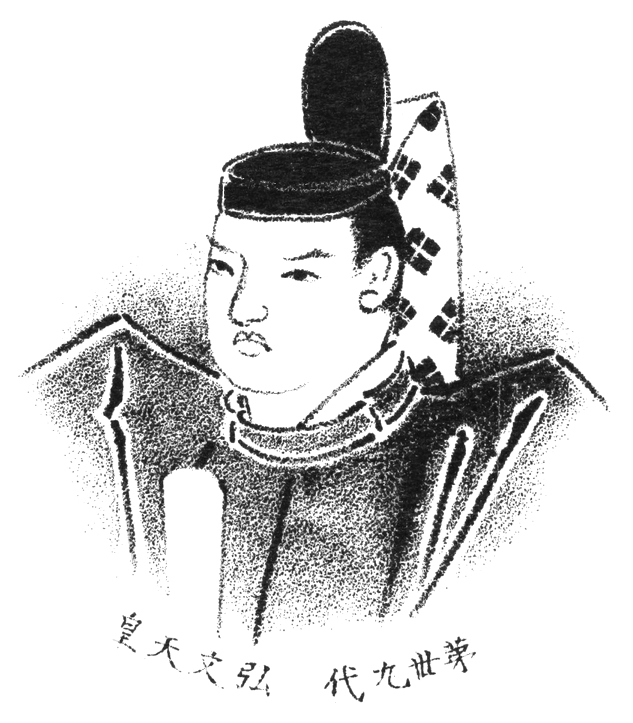
Emperor Kōbun

- January 7 – Tenji, emperor of Japan (b. 626)
- January 27 – Pope Vitalian
- March 2 – Chad of Mercia, Anglo-Saxon abbot
- August 21 – Kōbun, emperor of Japan (b. 648)

=== Date unknown ===
- Cenwalh, king of Wessex (approximate date)
- Jiang Ke, general of the Tang dynasty
- Recceswinth, king of the Visigoths
- Xu Jingzong, chancellor of the Tang dynasty (b. 592)
