= Itzan =

Archaeological site in Petén Department, Guatemala

Itzan is a Maya archaeological site located in the municipality of La Libertad in the Petén Department of Guatemala. Various small structures at the site were destroyed in the 1980s during oil exploration activities by Sonpetrol and Basic Resources Ltd, prompting rescue excavations by archaeologists. In spite of its small size, the site appears to have been the most politically important centre in its area, as evidenced by its unusually large quantity of monuments and the size of its major architecture.

The site was first occupied in the Middle Preclassic, with occupation continuing to the Late Classic.

== Location ==
The ruins are 25 kilometres (16 mi) northwest of the Dos Pilas archaeological site on the bank of a minor tributary of the Pasión River. The city was on a natural hilltop surrounded by ravines and seasonal swamps. The tributary of the Pasion River has its origin in Laguna Itzan, a small lake to the east of the site. A spring to the west of the site appears to have been a permanent watersource for the city. Itzan is situated roughly halfway between the Classic Period cities of Altar de Sacrificios and Seibal, and is located about 14 kilometres (8.7 mi) northeast of the former. The site is located approximately 50 kilometres (31 mi) west of the modern town of Sayaxché and 8 kilometres (5.0 mi) north of the Pasion River.

== History ==
Stanol evidence infers occupation of the Laguna Itzan catchment from the Early Preclassic. Itzan was continuously occupied from the Middle Preclassic through to the Late Classic, with much reduced activity during the Early Classic, with the latter period only being evidenced by a single burial accompanied by a ceramic plate.

Hieroglyphic Stairway 2 at the Late Classic period kingdom of Dos Pilas records that in 652 AD the powerful city of Calakmul seized control of Itzan, and Dos Pilas itself also won a major victory over the city. Itzan may also have gone to war against El Chorro.

A noblewoman from Itzan became the main wife of Bʼalaj Chan Kʼawiil, a king of Dos Pilas, and their son was Itzamnaaj Bʼalam. The collapse of the aggressive Dos Pilas kingdom in the late 8th century AD apparently benefited Itzan, which then experienced a period of renewed activity.

The site was discovered in February 1968 by Dennis and Louisa Wheeler, two Peace Corps volunteers. The ruins were then explored by archaeologists of the Ceibal Project in 1978, who only spent a few hours at the site.

== Site description ==
Itzan was a small city but was considered by archaeologists to have characteristics that made excavation worthwhile. Initial investigations recorded a number of carved monuments and large structures, some standing up to 7 metres (23 ft) high. The site core was mapped in 1986, when archaeologists noted that a number of carved monuments had been damaged by looters and that some of the buildings had been cut by looters' trenches. Various monument pieces that had been cut by looters were transferred to the departmental capital Flores with the intention of later moving them to Guatemala City.

The centre of the site is grouped around the North and South Plazas, both of which are open plazas, and the closed West and East Plazuelas which are completely enclosed by architecture.

The site core includes a formal acropolis, large plazas and a large amount of stelae and altars, totalling at least 25 monuments, all of which have been moved from their original locations by looters in order to excavate below them. Most of these monuments were originally positioned in open plazas in front of the largest structures. The remains of hieroglyphic texts were found associated with the North and South Stairways of the West Plaza. Much of the Late Classic period acropolis was built upon earlier Preclassic structures.

The site periphery between 3.6 to 4 kilometres (2.2 to 2.5 mi) south of the site core included at least three groups of simple perishable Late Classic residential structures laid out around central patios, without being built upon platforms, suggesting that the population of the site was greater than initially thought based on the site's monumental architecture. The entire settled area of Itzan occupies a ridge in a strip about 300 metres (980 ft) wide by 7 kilometres (4.3 mi) long, with the site core being situated near the centre of this zone. A modern road cuts through the area of settlement.

Stela 17 includes a hieroglyphic text that mentions lords of Itzan and of the nearby city of Altar de Sacrificios. It also contains a section of damaged text that may indicate warfare between Itzan and the site of El Chorro.

Stela 20 is fragmented. A large piece was found to the northwest of the acropolis.
