= Second Tikal–Calakmul War =

Central American war

- Part of Tikal–Calakmul wars
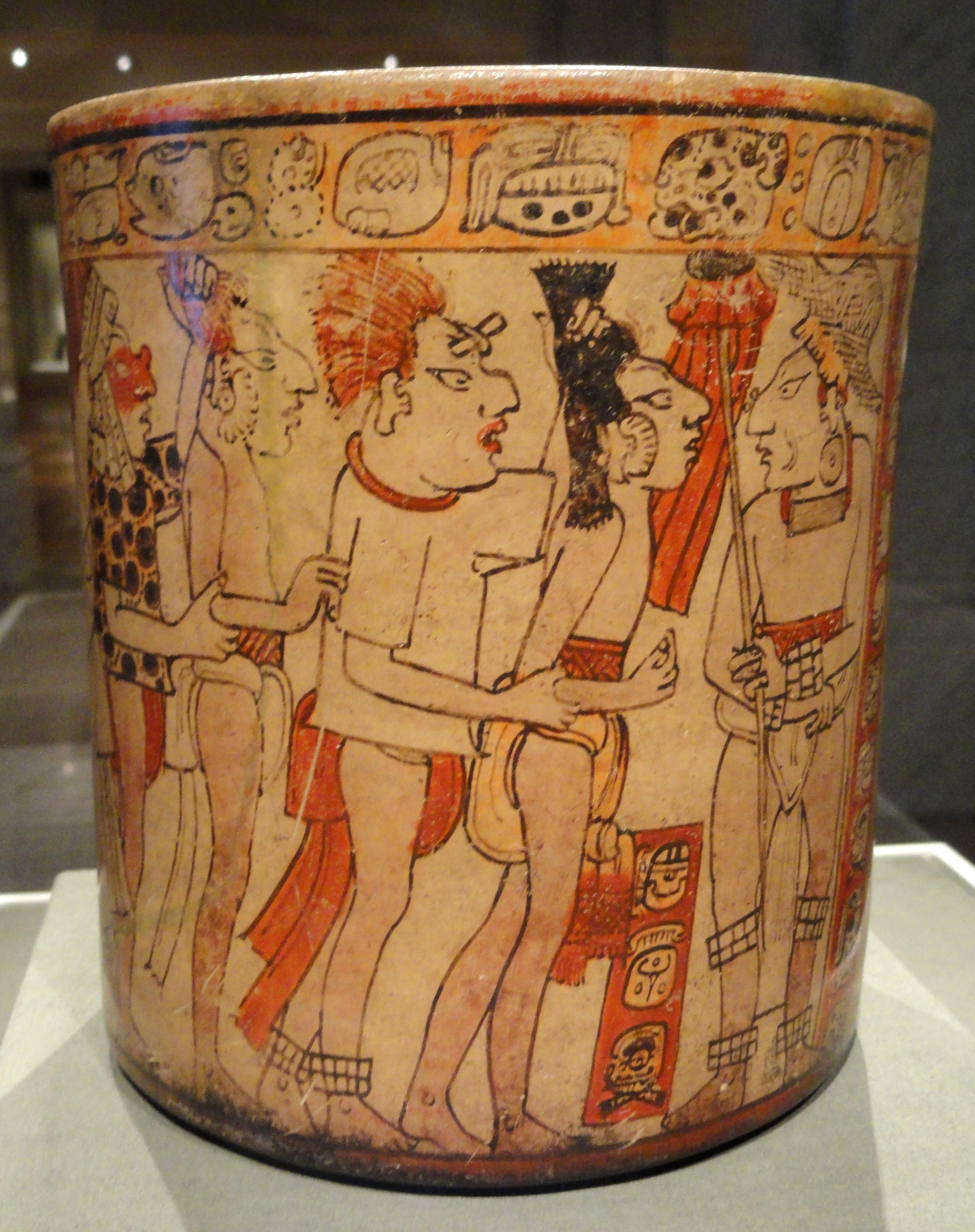
- Vase showing a battle scene between tikal and Calakmul
Date	648–695
Location	Modern Petén Department, Guatemala
Result	Tikal victory
Territorial changes	Dos Pilas secedes from Tikal and is vassalized by Calakmul; Calakmul conquers Tikal twice before being conquered by Tikal

Belligerents
Tikal	Calakmul; Naranjo	Dos Pilas

Commanders and leaders
Nuun Ujol Chaak†? Jasaw Chan Kʼawiil I	Yuknoom Chʼeen II; Yuknoom Yichʼaak Kʼahkʼ; Wak Chanil Ajaw	Bʼalaj Chan Kʼawiil

The Second Tikal–Calakmul War was the second in a series of wars between Tikal and Calakmul known as The Tikal–Calakmul wars. Tikal and Calakmul were two of the most prosperous cities in Peten during the classic period of Mesoamerican chronology. After the classic came the post classic which was characterized by a decline in Maya civilization. During that time both Tikal and Calakmul were abandoned.

== Dos Pilas ==
In 629 Ajaw Kʼinich Muwaan Jol II of Tikal made his son Bʼalaj Chan Kʼawiil ( in the Maya writing system) ruler of Dos Pilas, a newly founded vassal state of Tikal. B'alaj Chan K'awiil was a major protagonist in the bitter factional dispute between two lords carrying the same emblem glyph. The clash emerged from the obscurity of Tikal's 130-year Hiatus and coincided with the epic contest for political ascendency between Tikal and Calakmul. Bʼalaj Chan Kʼawiil's claim to the royal emblem of Mutal was evidently based on him being the son of K'inich Muwaan Jol II, as stated on Dos Pilas Panel 6. Nuun Ujol Chaak, the other bearer of the Tikal emblem, was probably his half-brother.

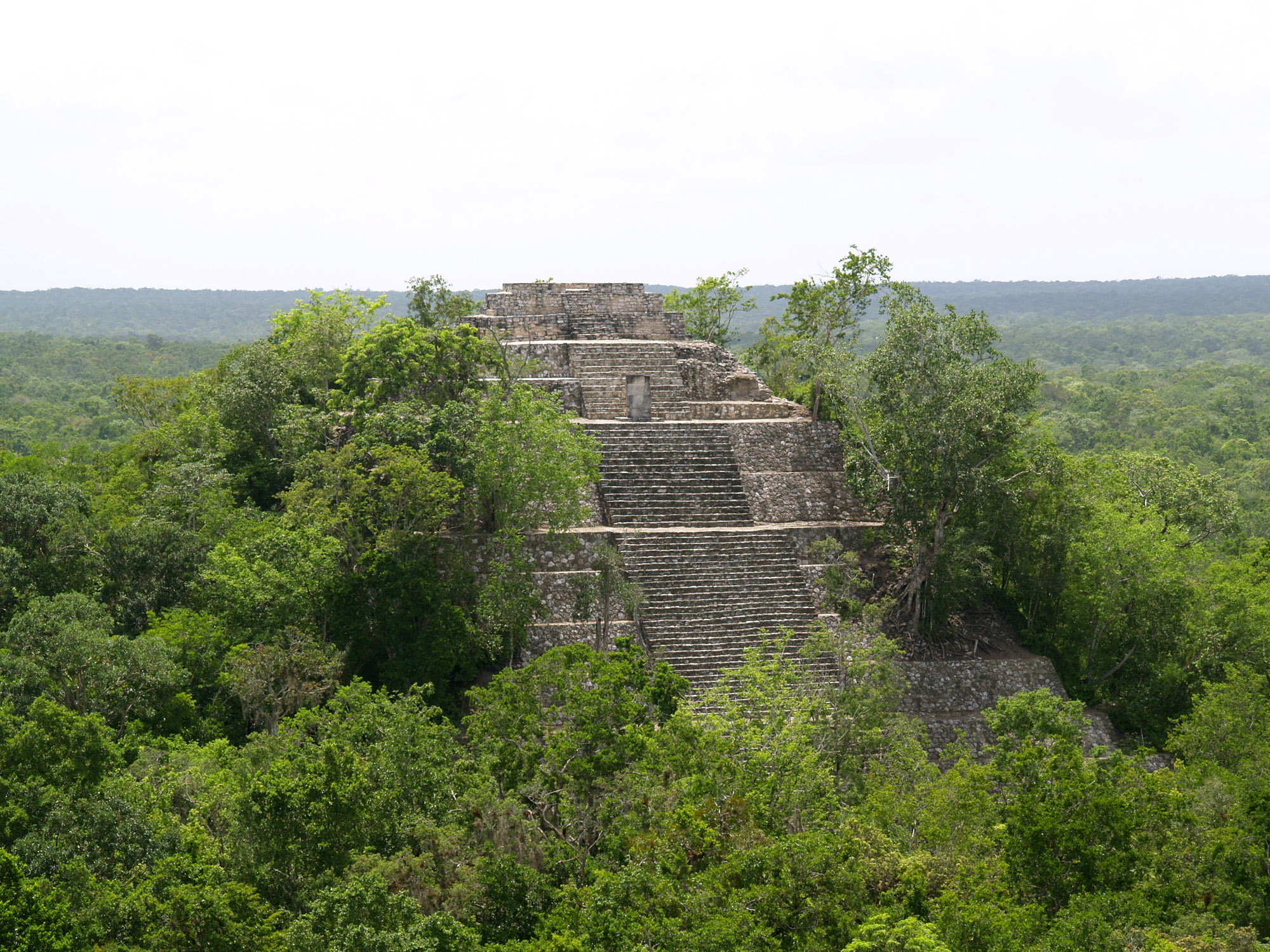
Calakmul

A recently exposed section of Hieroglyphic Stairway 2 in Dos Pilas might have thrown light on the timing and circumstances of a Tikal at the time, but erosion obscures most of the details of B'alaj Chan K'awiil's early life. The text does reveal that in 648 he scored a military victory while the same day saw the death of a lord bearing the Mutal emblem. It is unclear, but these events appear to serve as preamble to what came next. In 650 Yuknoom the Great, the Snake Lord, of Calakmul attacked Dos Pilas and forced Bʼalaj Chan Kʼawiil to take refuge at Aguateca. Then in 657 the Snake Lord attacked Tikal itself and drove Nuun Ujol Chaak from his city, establishing Calakmul as the supreme power in the entire region. B'alaj Chan K'awiil accepted Yuknoom Ch'een as his overlord, and Nuun Ujol Chaak was probably compelled to pledge fealty as well, for both lords carrying the Mutal emblem witnessed a ritual performed by Calakmul prince Yuknoom Yich'aak K'ahk' at some point in the years leading up to 662.

== Civil War ==
In 672, Nuun Ujol Chaak attacked Dos Pilas and forced Bʼalaj Chan Kʼawiil to abandon the city, this time fleeing to a place named Chaak Naah. The following year Chaak Naah was set burned by Nuun, and B'alaj Chan K'awiil was compelled to take flight again. He traveled to the kingdom of Hix Witz. It was not until Calakmul vanquished Nuun Ujol Chaak at Pulil in 677, that B'alaj Chan K'awiil is able to return to Dos Pilas. The final showdown came in 677 when B'alaj Chan K'awiil defeated Nuun Ujol Chaak and captured a Tikal lord named Nuun Bahlam.

== Tikal's return to power ==
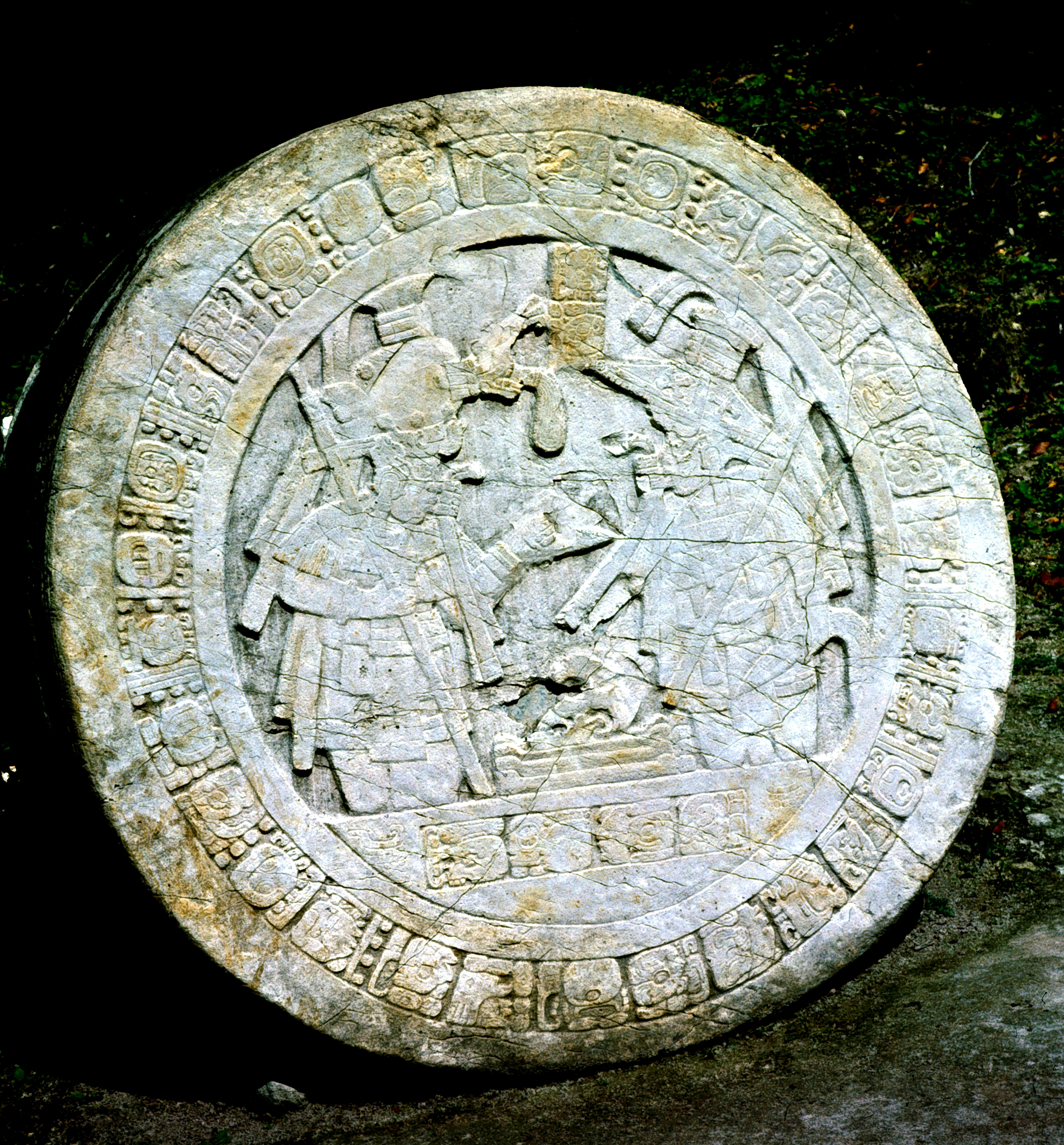
Jasaw Chan K'awiil I was Ajaw of Tikal in 695

Balaj Chan K'awiil began a program of monumental inscriptions in 682, recording his travails and ultimate victory, as well as his debt of fealty to Calakmul. He stated that he celebrated the 9.12.10.0.0 period ending at Calakmul in a ceremony with his overlord Yuknoom the Great, and he returned to Calakmul four years later for the accession of Yuknoom Yichʼaak Kʼahkʼ.

B'alaj Chan K'awiil's daughter Lady Six Sky re-founded the dynasty of Naranjo, while another daughter (or perhaps a sister) married into the royal lineage of Arroyo de Piedra, which together with Tamarindito had been one of the principal powers in the Petexbatun region before the founding of Dos Pilas. Bʼalaj Chan Kʼawiil's marriage to the Lady of Itzan (a nearby kingdom) produced at least one son and heir.

B'alaj died in 692 and three years later in 695 during a large battle Tikal turned the tables on Calakmul, ending the second war. After this the balance of power shifted heavily from Calakmul to Tikal.
