= GI-Kʼawiil of Cancuén =

G1-Kʼawiil of Cancuén
- Ajaw

Queen consort of Dos Pilas
- Spouse: King Uchaʼan Kʼin Bʼalam
- House: Royal house of Dos Pilas (by marriage)
- Religion: Maya religion

GI-Kʼawiil (G1-Kʼawiil) was a Queen consort of Dos Pilas. She is also known as the Lady of Cancuén.

== Biography ==
She was born in Cancuén. She married Uchaʼan Kʼin Bʼalam, king of Dos Pilas. It is likely that they had no son, because the successor of her husband was not her son.

Dos Pilas Panel 19 depicts Uchaʼan Kʼin Bʼalam and GI-Kʼawiil presiding over a ritual featuring a young boy.

The Hieroglyphic Bench of GI-Kʼawiil labels her husband as "He of Five Captives".
