= K'ahk' Xiiw Chan Chaahk =

K'ahk' Xiiw Chan Chaak
- Ajaw

King of Naranjo
- Reign: c.644-680
- Predecessor: K'uxaj
- Successor: Lady Six Sky (from 682)
- Born: Naranjo
- Died: c.680 Naranjo
- Father: K'uxaj (possibly)
- Religion: Maya religion

K'ahk' Xiiw Chan Chaahk (ruled c. 644 CE to c. 680 CE) was a Maya ruler of Naranjo who suffered a defeat by Caracol, probably in 680 CE. He is sometimes known as K'ahk' Skull Chan Chaak, a nickname bestowed by archaeologists before they could read the word "Xiiw." He was the 37th ruler of Naranjo according to inscriptions at the site, and succeeded the little-known K'uxaj.

His reign occurred during the first hiatus period at Naranjo, and his rule produced no known surviving monuments. However, some elements of his life have been reconstructed. He was probably in power by 644 CE, and he fought a successful star war against Caracol, even dragging a stairway listing Caracol's accomplishments back to the city of Naranjo. Yet a stucco text from Caracol, which is badly eroded, suggests Caracol retaliated. The record at Naranjo goes silent until the arrival of Lady Six Sky from Dos Pilas, who took over the dynasty. She was not related to K'ahk' Xiiw Chan Chaahk, but her husband K'ahk' U ? Chan Chaahk may have been a cousin.
