= Ordo annorum mundi =

Medieval Iberian text

The Ordo annorum mundi is a brief anonymous text written between the mid-5th century and the beginning of the 7th century. It enumerates the years from Adam to Jesus Christ by summing several stages of biblical history. The text, translated into English, reads as follow:

A calculation of the years of the world in brief. From Adam to the Flood: 2,242 years; from the Flood to Abraham: 942 years; from Abraham to Moses: 505 years; from the Exodus of the Children of Israel from Egypt until their entry into the Promised Land: 40 years; from the entry into the Promised Land until Saul, the first king of Israel, there were 355 years; Saul ruled for 40 years; from David until the start of construction of the Temple: 43 years; from the start of construction of the Temple until the deportation to Babylon, kings ruled for 443 years; the captivity of the people and the desolation of the Temple lasted 70 years; the restoration by Zerubabbel took 4 years; after the restoration, until the incarnation of Christ: 515 years; added together, the entire time from Adam until Christ totals 5,199 years.

Five different Latin versions are known, along with translations into Romance languages. The original version consists of eleven entries, concludes with the incarnation of Christ, and dates it to the year 5199 from creation.

All surviving testimonies are of Hispanic origin. Some attribute the authorship to Julian Pomerius, a cleric of African origin who lived in the 5th century and settled in Gaul after the arrival of the Vandals. In other manuscriptssuch as the Códice de Roda, the text extends to the year 672, corresponding to the reign of Wamba, leading some to consider it a synthesis of Julian of Toledo's treatise De comprobatione sextae aetatis libri tres. These hypotheses have been discarded, and it has been established that it is a composition based on Jerome of Stridon's Latin translation of Eusebius of Caesarea's Canons.
