= Yax Mayuy Chan Chaak =

Maya ruler

- Ajaw

King of Naranjo
- Reign: c. 728 - 4 February 744
- Predecessor: Kʼakʼ Tiliw Chan Chaak
- Successor: Kʼakʼ Yipiy Chan Chaak (brother)
- Regent: Lady Wak Chanil Ajaw (c.728-741) (possibly)
- Born: Naranjo
- Died: 4 February 744; Naranjo
- Father: K'ak' U ? Chan Chaak or Kʼakʼ Tiliw Chan Chaak
- Mother: Lady Wak Chanil Ajaw or Lady Unen Bahlam of Tuub'al
- Religion: Maya religion

Yax Mayuy Chan Chaak (died 744?) was a ruler of the Maya city of Naranjo who is mentioned on Naranjo stelae 18 and 46. He was the king after K'ak' Tiliw Chan Chaak, who was possibly his older brother or his father. On August 15, 725 CE, he participated in a poorly-understood ritual at Naranjo with the otherwise-unknown Yax Bajlaj Chan Chaak, according to Stela 46; this ritual may have been a type of recognition of the heirship to the throne.

He played a role in a successful military conquest of the Komkom people in 726 CE, when he was a young man or teenager, according to Stela 18.

Because of the scarcity of monuments from his administration, his rule is considered to take place during the "Second Hiatus Period" at Naranjo. During his time in office, Naranjo suffered a series of military losses at the hands of Tikal, possibly as fallout from Naranjo's support for Tikal's enemy Dos Pilas. Tikal burned ritual buildings, burned an effigy of Naranjo's god, and sacked the cave at which the people of Naranjo performed important rituals.

During these attacks, Yax Mayuy was apparently captured and taken to Tikal, where he is shown portrayed in ropes on Tikal Stela 5. He was possibly executed on February 4, 744 CE, the date of the stela's erection, or shortly after.
