= Yichʼaak Bʼalam =

Yichʼaak Bahlam
- Ajaw
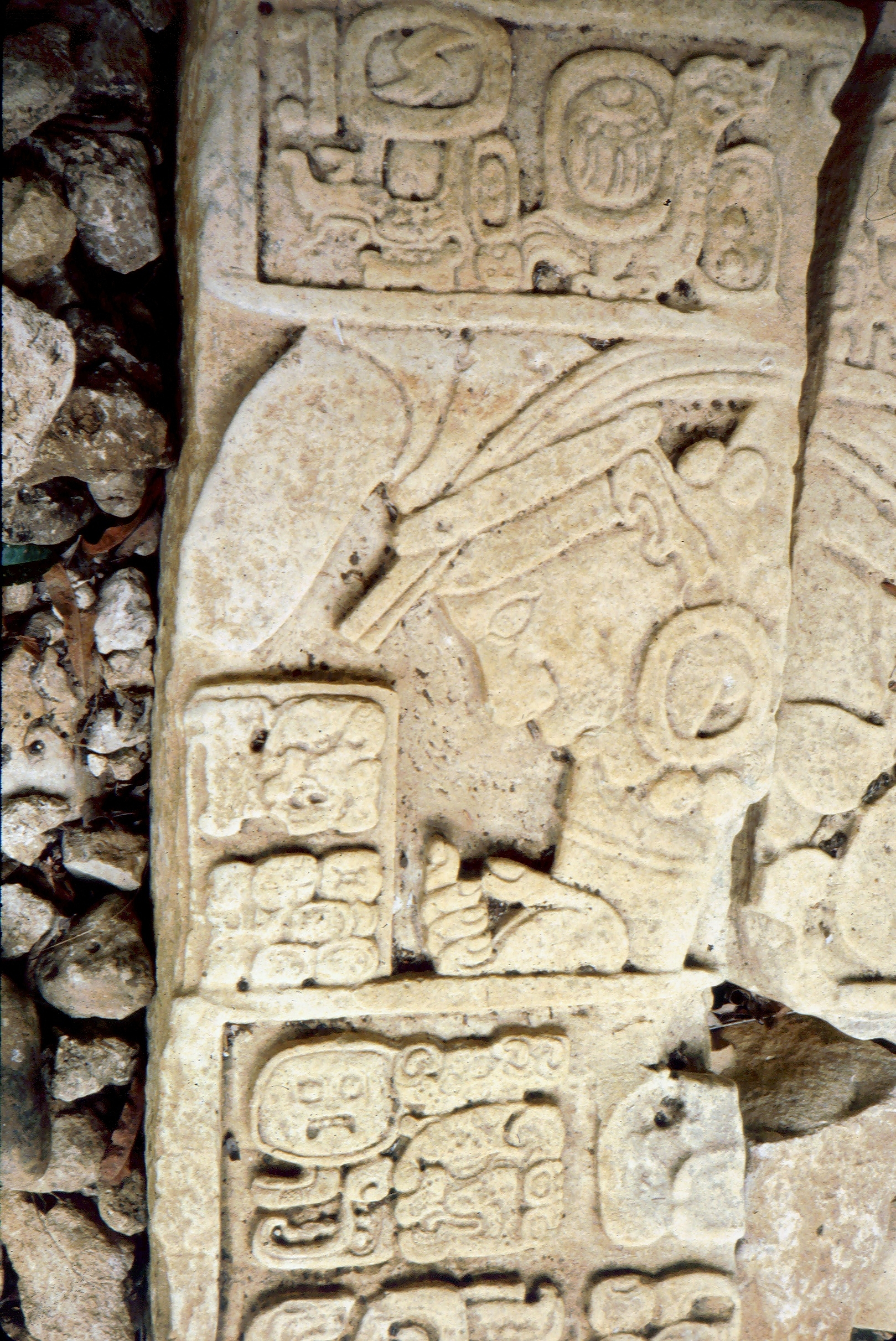
- Stela 16 from Dos Pilas depicts the defeated king Yichʼaak Bʼalam.

King of Seibal
- Reign: c.735-c.750?
- Religion: Maya religion

Yichʼaak Bʼalam was a Maya king of Seibal.

In AD 735 Uchaʼan Kʼin Bʼalam - the fourth king of Dos Pilas kingdom - attacked Seibal, capturing Yichʼaak Bʼalam. The captive king was not executed but rather became a vassal of his more powerful neighbour. Yichʼaak Bʼalam is shown under the feet of Uchaʼan Kʼin Bʼalam on Aguateca Stela 2.

Yichʼaak Bʼalam continued as a vassal under the next king of Dos Pilas, Kʼawiil Chan Kʼinich, who presided over rituals at Seibal in 745 and 747.
