= Lady of Itzan =

- Queen consort of Dos Pilas
- Spouse: King Bʼalaj Chan Kʼawiil
- Issue: King Itzamnaaj Bʼalam; King Itzamnaaj Kʼawiil
- House: Royal house of Dos Pilas (by marriage)
- Religion: Maya religion

Lady of Itzan (7th-century) was a queen of Dos Pilas.

== Biography ==
She was born in Itzan. She married Bʼalaj Chan Kʼawiil, the king of Dos Pilas. She was the mother of the kings Itzamnaaj Bʼalam and Itzamnaaj Kʼawiil.

It is possible that her daughter was Wak Chanil Ajaw. It is also possible that she had one more daughter.

Another wife of Bʼalaj Chan Kʼawiil was Lady Buluʼ.
