= Kʼakʼ Tiliw Chan Chaak =

K'ak' Tiliw Chan Chaak
- Ajaw

King of Naranjo
- Reign: 31 May 693 - c. 728
- Predecessor: Lady Wak Chanil Ajaw
- Successor: Yax Mayuy Chan Chaak
- Regent: Lady Wak Chanil Ajaw
- Born: 4 January 688; Naranjo
- Died: c. 728; Naranjo
- Spouse: Lady Unen Bahlam of Tuub'al
- Issue: Yax Mayuy Chan Chaak (possibly); K'ahk' Yipiy Chan Chaak (possibly); K'ahk' Ukalaw Chan Chaak
- Father: K'ak' U ? Chan Chaak
- Mother: Lady Wak Chanil Ajaw
- Religion: Maya religion

Kʼakʼ Tiliw Chan Chaak (born 4 January 688 CE), alternatively known by the nickname Smoking Squirrel bestowed before his name glyph was deciphered, was a Maya ruler of Naranjo. He led the city during an extensive military campaign against Yaxha; however, because of his young age at the time, it is presumed that his mother organized much of the campaign.

His grandfather, B'alaj Chan K'awiil of Dos Pilas, sent K'ak' Tiliw's mother Lady Six Sky (sometimes called Lady Wak Chanil Ajaw but probably actually Wak Chan Jalam Lem?) to Naranjo to reestablish a royal dynasty there after the defeat of Naranjo under Ruler I by Caracol. The first sacred rituals for her arrival began on 30 August 682.

K'ak' Tiliw Chan Chaak became ruler of Naranjo on 31 May 693. Shortly after, Naranjo fought and won a series of victories against polities, some of whom may have been rebelling against K'ak' Tiliw's mother. While most of these were smaller polities, Yaxha, Tikal, and Ucanal all suffered defeats at the hands of Naranjo during this time. However, as he was quite young during these battles, it is assumed that his mother was the chief architect of the wars.

Once of age, he built many monuments in the city he ruled. He was apparently a patron of the arts, especially ceramic, and he is referred to as Sak Chuwen, Pure (or White) Artisan, on Stela 18. His wife was Ix Unen B'ahlam. Though she was from the city of Tuubal, a small polity Naranjo defeated in 693 CE, the similarity between her name and a former ruler of Tikal, Lady Unen Bahlam, has led some scholars to suggest she was at least distantly related to the Tikal lineage.

He may have had a contentious relationship with his mother Lady 6 Sky, who built stelae noting her important contributions to the city during his time in office. His father is rarely mentioned in public murals, with Naranjo Stela 46 being the only currently-known example. There, his father is named as K'ak' U ? Chan Chaak. It is possible his father was relatively unimportant in city politics before the arrival of Lady Six Sky, but his use of the Holy Naranjo Lord emblem glyph suggests he was at least a member of the royal family.

He died of unknown causes in his forties, setting off an interregnum in Naranjo that ended when Yax Mayuy Chan Chaak, possibly his younger brother or son, took the throne.
