= Itzamnaaj Kʼawiil =

Mayan king of Dos Pilas (673–726)

- Ajaw
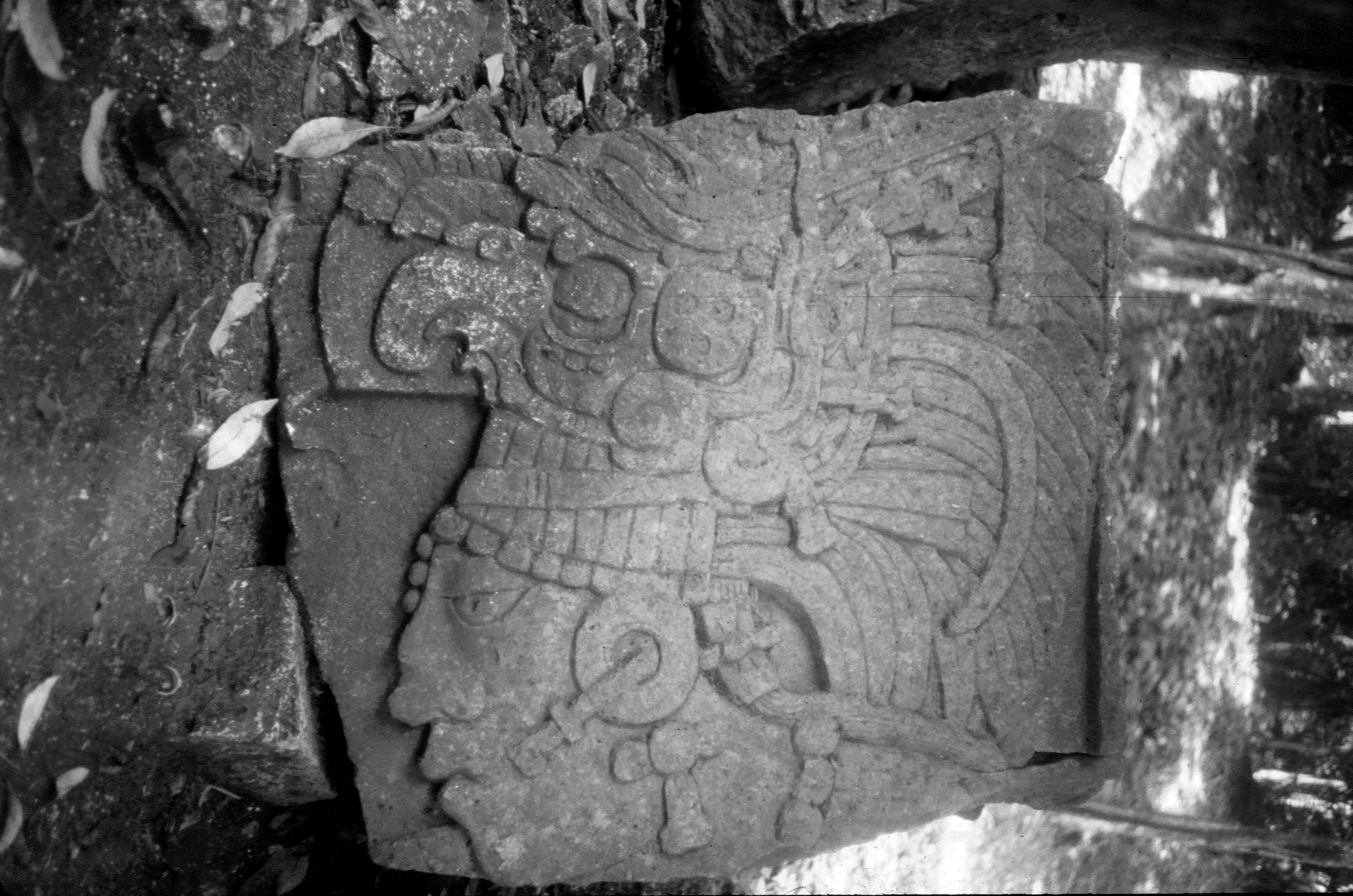
- Itzamnaaj Kʼawiil on stela

King of Dos Pilas
- Reign: 24 March 698 – 22 October 726
- Predecessor: Itzamnaaj Bahlam
- Successor: Uchaʼan Kʼin Bahlam
- Born: 25 January 673; Dos Pilas
- Died: 22 October 726 (aged 53); Dos Pilas
- Issue: Kʼawiil Chan Kʼinich
- Father: Bʼalaj Chan Kʼawiil
- Mother: Lady of Itzan
- Religion: Maya religion

Itzamnaaj Kʼawiil (January 673? – 22 October 726) was a Mayan king of Dos Pilas. He was the third known ruler of that place. He is also known as the Ruler 2 and Shield God K.

== Biography ==
He was a son of the king Bʼalaj Chan Kʼawiil and Lady of Itzan. He is recorded as having been born on 25 January 673, although it is possible that this is a scribal error. It could also have been an intentional glossing over of the fact that he was born in exile during the protracted warfare.

He was the brother and successor of Itzamnaaj Bʼalam. He also had a sister, Wak Chanil Ajaw, and was an uncle of Kʼakʼ Tiliw Chan Chaak.

His successor was Uchaʼan Kʼin Bʼalam. It is possible that his son was Kʼawiil Chan Kʼinich.

He reigned from 24 March 698 to his death on 22 October 726. He made at least one ritual circuit.
