= Itzamnaaj Bʼalam =

Itzamnaaj Bahlam
- Ajaw

King of Dos Pilas
- Reign: 692-698
- Predecessor: Bʼalaj Chan Kʼawiil
- Successor: Itzamnaaj Kʼawiil
- Born: Dos Pilas
- Died: c.698? Dos Pilas
- Father: Bʼalaj Chan Kʼawiil
- Mother: Lady of Itzan
- Religion: Maya religion

Itzamnaaj Bʼalam was a king of Dos Pilas. His reign was short.

== Family ==
He was the son and successor of Bʼalaj Chan Kʼawiil, and brother and predecessor of Itzamnaaj Kʼawiil. He was also a brother of Wak Chanil Ajaw and uncle of Kʼakʼ Tiliw Chan Chaak.

His mother was the Lady of Itzan.
