= Kʼawiil Chan Kʼinich =

- Ajaw

King of Dos Pilas
- Reign: 27 June 741- 761
- Predecessor: Uchaʼan Kʼin Bahlam
- Successor: None
- Born: Dos Pilas
- Died: 761; Dos Pilas
- Father: Itzamnaaj Kʼawiil
- Religion: Maya religion

Kʼawiil Chan Kʼinich was the last Maya king of Dos Pilas. He is also known as the Ruler 4 and God K Sky Mahkʼina.

He reigned from 23 June 741 until c. 761. Dates of his birth and death are unknown.

== Biography ==
It is likely that he was a son of the king Itzamnaaj Kʼawiil. He was a successor of Uchaʼan Kʼin Bʼalam, who was likely his regent.

It appears that Kʼawiil Chan Kʼinich repaid his debt to his probable guardian and regent by recording his death and that of his wife on Hieroglyphic Bench 1. His accession followed the death of his predecessor within days, and it is possible that he was still young enough that the kingdom's enemies saw this as an opportunity to attack. The other possibility is that Kʼawill Chan Kʼinich set out to establish a military reputation for himself; even before his accession he had captured a lord from Ahkul and thereafter styled himself "Master of the Ahkul Lord", while Hieroglyphic Stairway 3 records captures from El Chorro, Yaxchilan and Motul de San José.

Yichʼaak Bʼalam, king of Seibal, performed rituals overseen by Kʼawiil Chan Kʼinich.

A hieroglyphic stairway at Tamarindito records Kʼawiil Chan Kʼinich's "going out", a verb which often has the sense of "fleeing".

It is not known when and where did he died.
