= Uchaʼan Kʼin Bʼalam =

Uchaʼan Kʼin Bahlam
- Ajaw
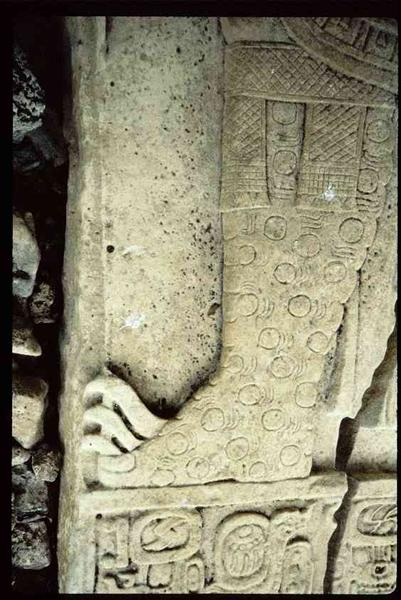
- Stela 5 of Dos Pilas is Uchaʼan Kʼin Bʼalam's monument.

King of Dos Pilas
- Reign: 8 January 727 - 28 May 741
- Predecessor: Itzamnaaj Kʼawiil
- Successor: Kʼawiil Chan Kʼinich
- Died: 28 May 741; Dos Pilas
- Spouse: Lady GI-Kʼawiil of Cancuén
- Religion: Maya religion

Uchaʼan Kʼin Bʼalam (died on May 28, 741) was the fourth Mayan king of Dos Pilas. He is also known as the Ruler 3, Master of Sun Jaguar, Scroll-head God K, Spangle-head and Jewelled-head. His title was "He of Five Captives".

He reigned from 727 to 741.

== Biography ==
His parents are not known. He was a successor of the king Itzamnaaj Kʼawiil.

The fact that Uchaʼan Kʼin Bʼalam followed Itzamnaaj Kʼawiil on the throne even though the latter probably had a son, can be explained in this way: the royal prince was too young to assume the rulership on his own, so there was a need for his regent.

One depiction shows us Uchaʼan Kʼin Bʼalam presiding over a ritual featuring a young boy, presumably the prince and his successor Kʼawiil Chan Kʼinich.

Uchaʼan Kʼin Bʼalam is famous for capturing Yichʼaak Bʼalam, king of Seibal.

He erected victory monuments at both Dos Pilas and Aguateca.

He died on May 28, 741.

== Marriage ==
Uchaʼan Kʼin Bʼalam married GI-Kʼawiil, Lady of Cancuén. It seems that they had no children.
