= Bʼalaj Chan Kʼawiil =

- Ajaw

King of Dos Pilas
- Reign: 648-692
- Predecessor: None
- Successor: Itzamnaaj Bahlam
- Born: 15 October 625; Tikal
- Died: 692 (aged 66–67); Dos Pilas
- Spouse: Lady of Itzan; Lady Buluʼ
- Issue: Itzamnaaj Bʼalam, King of Dos Pilas; Itzamnaaj K'awiil, King of Dos Pilas; Lady Wak Chanil, Queen of Naranjo
- Father: K'inich Muwaan Jol II, King of Tikal
- Religion: Maya religion

Bʼalaj Chan Kʼawiil (15 October 625 – ??) was a Maya king of Dos Pilas. He is also known as Ruler 1, Flint Sky God K and Malah Chan Kʼawil.

== Early years ==
He was born in Tikal on 15 October 625 A.D. His father was K'inich Muwaan Jol II, who was either the 23rd or 24th king of the Tikal dynasty; Nuun Ujol Chaak, future king of Tikal, was either his brother or half-brother. At the age of 6, he carried out a pre-accession ritual. At the age of 9 or 10, he carried out another pre-accession ritual where a royal insignia was imposed that consisted of a wide ribbon on the forehead knotted behind, occurred in Tikal. During his childhood years an event of escape or exile is unclearly narrated, but years later he returned to Tikal; other authors suggest that it is another pre-accession event. At the age of 16, a ceremony takes place where the royal scepter is publicly displayed in Dos Pilas, which would be considered as still very young if not because his father resides in the distant Tikal. In conclusion, he is sent to direct the city of Dos Pilas under the auspices of the king of Tikal.

== Reign in Dos Pilas ==
The reasons are unclear, but Dos Pilas and Tikal's relationship eventually deteriorated, culminating in a long war. In 648 A.D., the "Civil War of Tikal" began when B'ajlaj Chan K'awiil, at the age of 21, defeated the armed forces of Tikal led by an important nobleman named Lam Naah K'awiil. The battle took place in eastern Petén, at a still unidentified site called Sakha'al , possibly near the modern Sacnab lake.

At the time, the kingdom of Tikal was divided into two: the remaining kingdom with its capital under the control of Nuun Ujol Chaak, and the rebel area to the southwest under the control of B'ajlaj Chan K'awiil. The king of Calakmul, staunch enemy of Tikal, Yuknoom Ch'een II took advantage of the circumstances to "divide and conquer"; he chose the smaller and presumably weaker of the two sides first. On 20 December 650 A.D., Calakmul attacks Dos Pilas and B'ajlaj, then 25 years old, had to flee to the city of Aguateca. Apparently, Calakmul consolidated its victory over Dos Pilas by subjugating the entire region of La Pasión River, northwest of Dos Pilas. Six years later, in 657 A.D., Calakmul invades Tikal. Nuun Ujol Chaahk was forced to flee to an yet unidentified place called Sakpa...n, and the nobility of Tikal was persecuted. Finally, between 657 and 662 A.D., a pre-accession event of the heir to the Snake Kingdom occurred, Yuknoom Yich’aak K’ahk', who was then between 8 and 13 years old; this event was witnessed by Nuun Ujol Chaak and B'ajlaj Chan K'awiil, which Guenter (2002) interprets as the "Yaxhá Agreement", which occurred in this city, in which both kings declared themselves as vassals of Yuknoom Yich'aak K'ahk'.

After the Yaxhá Agreement, B'ajlaj returned to Dos Pilas, now as vassal of the Snake Kingdom. In 662 d.C., together with the king of a place called B'ahlam, he attacked a nobleman from Kob'an , a site that some authors interpret to be in the modern city of Cobán, in the Maya highlands, much further south of Dos Pilas. In 664 d.C. he captured Tajal Mo ' from Machaquilá, one of his most important captures, and possibly also conquered that city . Around this time, he married a princess from the city of Itzán, to the northwest of Dos Pilas. On 8 December 672 A.D. Nuun Ujol Chaak's army attacked and conquered Dos Pilas, for which B'ajlaj Chan K'awiil was forced into exile in a city still not archaeologically identified, called Chaahk Naah , but it is deduced that it is to the north of Dos Pilas. Nuun Ujol Chaak continued the persecution of his brother, in May 673 he invaded and burned two cities allied to Dos Pilas, and in June of the same year he invaded Chaahk Naah, forcing B'ajlaj to withdraw to Hiix Witz , another important site not yet identified, but which was tributary to Piedras Negras, that during that time he was in alliance or even possibly in vassalage of Calakmul.

On 13 December 677 A.D., Yuknoom Ch'een's army, along with B'ajlaj, at the age of 52, finally counterattacked the forces of Tikal, invaded and burned the city of Puluul, still not identified, but found in southwestern Petén, adjacent to central Petén; Nuun Ujol Chaak was forced to flee to Paptuun , in eastern Petén, after this attack. Seven days after this attack, B'ajlaj Chan K'awiil finally returned to Dos Pilas after 5 years in exile. On 30 April 679, the last event of the Mutul Civil War took place; on that day the forces of B'ajlaj, supported by the forces of Calakmul, entered Tikal where they defeated the army of his brother and carried out a massacre against the people of central Petén. Although the fate of his brother is not mentioned, it is deductible that he died during or as a result of this event. This was followed by an interreign in Tikal under the control of B'ajlaj until 3 years later the son of Nuun Ujol Chaahk, Jasaw Chan K'awiil ascended the throne of Tikal . In 682 AD he travelled to Calakmul where he accompanied Yuhknoom Ch'een in dance ceremonies and celebrated the victory against Tikal; in that year he also commissioned the creation of the hieroglyphic staircase 2 of Dos Pilas; and he also sent his daughter Lady Wak Chanil Ajaw to the city of Naranjo to restore the dynasty of that kingdom under the auspices of Calakmul . By 686, B'alaj Chan K'awiil was 60, and on 3 April attended the accession of Yuknoom Yich'aak K'ahk' in Calakmul, as Snake King. Little else is known of B'ajlaj Chan K'awiil's last years; the last record we have is that he performed a dance ceremony in Aguateca in 692. His son, Itzamnaaj K'awiil, ascended to the throne of the kingdom of Petexbatún in 698, so the death of B'alaj must have occurred between 692 and 698. It is still unclear whether Itzamnaaj B'ahlam is a synonymous name with Itzamnaaj K'awiil or is another son of B'ajlaj Chan K'awiil; if so, his reign occurred before Itzamnaaj K'awiil and the death of his father must have occurred closer to 692.

== Family ==
Bʼalaj Chan Kʼawiil had two wives: Lady of Itzan and Lady Buluʼ.

A daughter of Bʼalaj Chan Kʼawiil and Lady Bulu', Wak Chanil Ajaw, left Dos Pilas to found a dynasty at Naranjo. Another daughter (or perhaps a sister) married into the royal lineage of Arroyo de Piedra.

With the Lady of Itzan, Bʼalaj Chan Kʼawiil was a father of Itzamnaaj Bʼalam and Itzamnaaj Kʼawiil and he was a grandfather to a king of Naranjo, Kʼakʼ Tiliw Chan Chaak, with Lady Bulu'

== In art ==
Dos Pilas Stela 9, dated to AD 682, bears the only known portrait of this king.
