= Lady Six Sky =

Female Maya ruler

Lady Wak Chan Jalam Ajaw Lem Lady Six Sky
- Ajaw
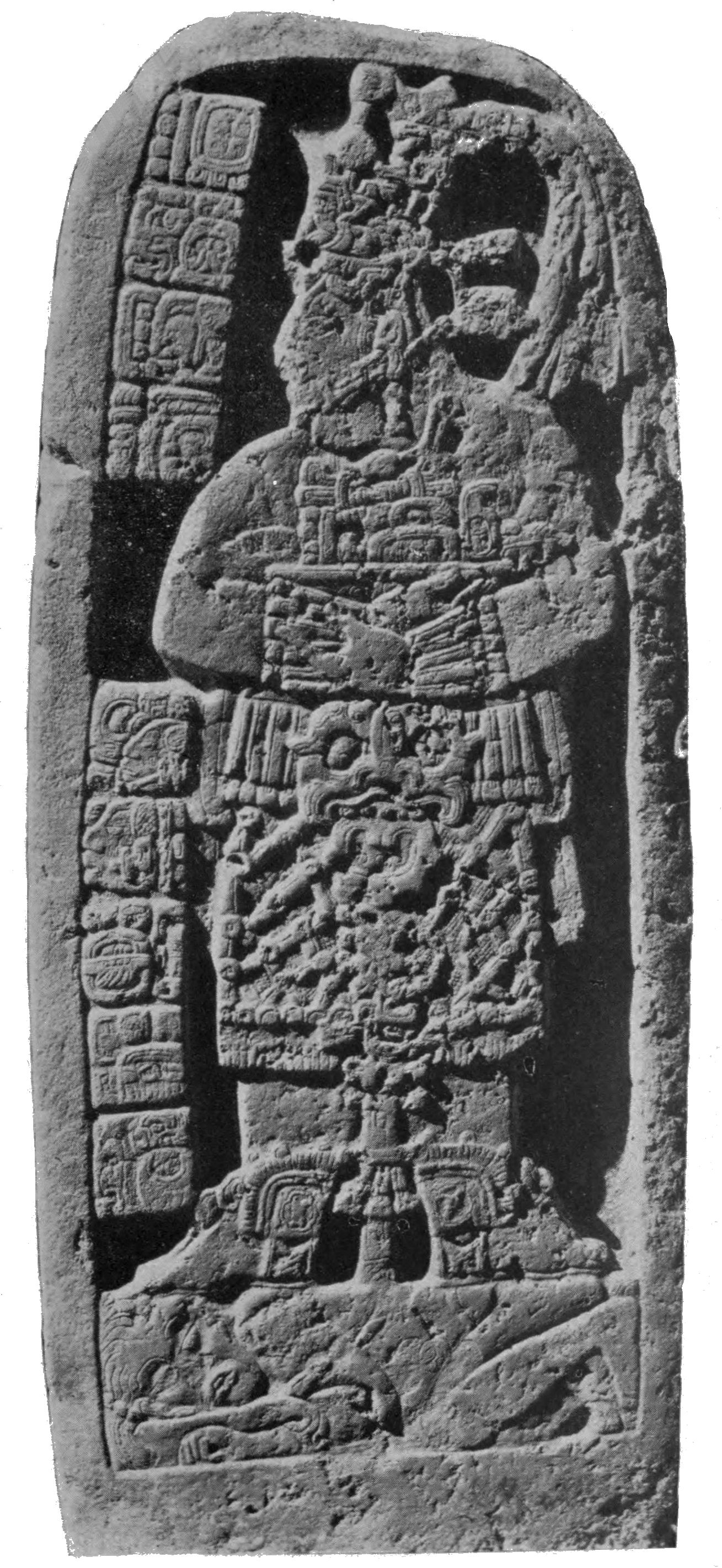
- Lady Six Sky's portrait in Stela 24, standing atop a captive from K'inichkaab and dressed in maize god and moon goddess regalia.

Queen of Naranjo
- Reign: 682–693 (as de facto queen)
- Predecessor: K'ahk' Xiiw Chan Chaahk
- Successor: Kʼakʼ Tiliw Chan Chaak

Regent of Naranjo
- Regency: 693–741
- Monarch: Kʼakʼ Tiliw Chan Chaak (693 – c. 728); Yax Mayuy Chan Chaak (c. 728 – 741)
- Born: Date of birth unknown Dos Pilas
- Died: February 10 or 11, 741; Naranjo
- Spouse: K'ak' U ? Chan Chaak [of Naranjo]
- Issue: Kʼakʼ Tiliw Chan Chaak; Yax Mayuy Chan Chaak
Names
- Possibly Ix Wak Chanjalam Ajaw Lem/Win?
- Father: Bʼalaj Chan Kʼawiil, King of Dos Pilas
- Mother: Lady Buluʼ
- Religion: Maya religion
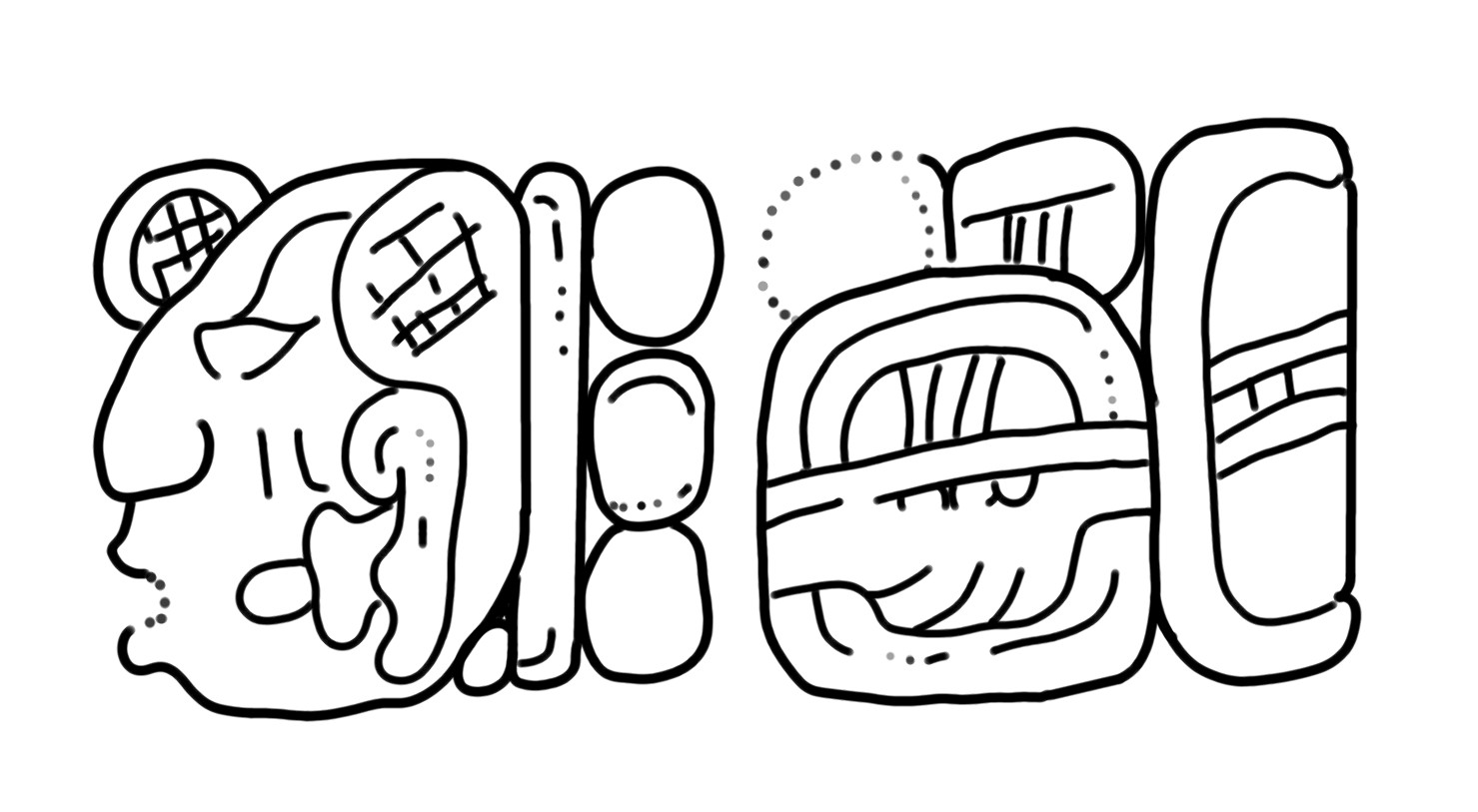
- Signature

Lady Six Sky (possibly Ix Wak Chan Jalam Ajaw Lem? in ancient Mayan), also known as Lady Wac Chanil Ahau or Wak Chanil Ajaw (d. 741 CE), was a Maya queen of Naranjo who was born in Dos Pilas. She lived in Naranjo from 682 to her death (or shortly before her death) in 741. During that time, she likely served as the ruler of the city; however, monuments such as Stela 24 suggest she was never formally recognized as such, since she continued to use the emblem glyph of Dos Pilas throughout her life.

Because the reading of her name is currently contested, scholars typically refer to her as Lady Six Sky, which is the English translation of a readable portion of her name (Wak Chan meaning Six Sky).

Monuments that refer to Lady Six Sky include Naranjo stelae 3, 18, 24, 29, 31, and 46.

== Personal life ==
Lady Six Sky was the daughter of B'alaj Chan K'awiil of Dos Pilas and a woman who may have been named Lady B'ulu ? or Lady B'uluka'l. Though Lady B'ulu was not B'alaj Chan K'awiil's first wife, she carried the prestigious title ochk'in kalo'mte (loosely, "western autocrat") on Stela 24, suggesting a high level of political power.

In 682 CE, Lady Six Sky arrived in Naranjo to establish a new dynasty at the behest of her father. She was part of an arranged marriage between the Maya cities of Dos Pilas and Naranjo (in modern Guatemala) to bring Naranjo into the Calakmul–Dos Pilas alliance. This may have been a direct response to Tikal's recent defeat of Calakmul.

Little is known about her husband, though he may have been a low-status cousin of the previous king, K’ahk’ Xiiw Chan Chaahk. This king had been defeated two years earlier by Caracol, leaving a power vacuum. Her husband's name appears on Naranjo Stela 46. Though the reading is not yet fully deciphered, it was something like K'ak' U ? Chan Chaak.

During her time in Naranjo, Lady Six Sky presumably served as ruler of the city, though in text (such as on stelae 24 and 29), she still carried the title of Holy Lady of Dos Pilas. A little more than five years after her arrival, on January 6, 688, she gave birth to a son, the future king of Naranjo Kʼakʼ Tiliw Chan Chaak. His birth is commemorated among other high points of the queen's life on stelae 24 and 29.

For many years, scholars debated if K'ak' Tiliw was her son or not, but the more recently discovered Stela 46, which was discovered in 2017, includes a definitive relationship statement between the two. He became a five-year-old king, and his mother Lady Six Sky ruled as his regent.

Their relationship may have been an uneasy one; Christophe Helmke notes that the queen erected monuments that centered herself as ruler well into K'ak' Tiliw Chan Chaak's adulthood, suggesting that she competed with him for power and influence. K'ak' Tiliw Chan Chaak died of unknown causes in his early forties, and Lady Six Sky seems to have promoted a new ruler, Yax Mayuy Chan Chaak. This ruler appears on Naranjo Stela 18 in text that was probably a late addition to the monument; here, his presence at important events, including a star war with Komkom, are used to imply his fitness to rule. He may have been a younger brother of K'ak' Tiliw Chan Chaak.

A name that is probably hers appears in reference to a scattering ritual at Dos Pilas on February 10 or 11, 741; this may be the date of her death, though this fact is contested.

== Daykeeper and Warrior-Queen ==
Despite never receiving the title Holy Lady of Naranjo, Lady Six Sky commissioned monuments in Naranjo that note she performed important rituals, some shortly after her arrival. For example, Stela 29 describes a burning ritual on August 31, 682, just three days after her arrival in Naranjo. But her early days in Naranjo may have been beset by rival claims to the throne, and she did not begin seriously commissioning monuments until almost two decades into her rule.

That said, she may have been responsible for a method of counting moon phases that spread during the Period of Uniformity; during this time, Glyph C values across the Maya area remained consistent. She had a penchant for celebrating the rare "Tikal Cycle" period endings which happened on #.#.3.0.0 days of the Maya Long Count calendar; she celebrated 9.13.3.0.0 (March 1, 695) and 9.14.3.0.0 (November 17, 714), both memorialized on Stela 29.

She also supervised the production of high-quality pottery, a trend which continued during the rule of her son, who became known as Pure (or White) Artisan for his patronage of the arts.

Additionally, she is shown on monuments taking on the role of a warrior-king by standing over a trampled captive, an unusual representation for a woman. Naranjo Stela 24 from April 17, 699, is one such depiction; there, she stands on a captive from the small polity of K'inichil Kab. Stela 29 from November 17, 714, also shows her standing on a captive, though it is too eroded to make out the captive's name or place of origin. Besides K'inichil Kab, she was involved in the sacking of at least nine other polities, and she waged a victorious war against the Komkom polity in April 726, according to Stela 18. Her son K'ak' Tiliw Chan Chaak and future Naranjo leader Yax Mayuy Chan Chaak were also both involved.

On Stela 24, she also appears dressed in the net skirt of the maize god, another uncommon trait for women. She may have taken the name "Six" because of its association with the maize god, though she also emphasized her relationship with the moon goddess. The combination of maize god and moon goddess symbolism may have been a deliberate message that the ruler was capable of both masculine and feminine roles.

For example, on Stela 24, she is described as ub'aah (short for ub'aahila'n) ti yax k'uh, "she is portrayed as the first god," meaning she was seen as literally serving as a vessel for this god. On the side of Stela 24, this ritual is described in more detail; here the god is referred to as the moon goddess despite the net skirt which was worn mostly by men. This ritual took place on April 17, 699. According to Stela 47, she also impersonated the moon goddess on February 9, 726, which was the Maya new year, following the 260-day sacred calendar.

When K'ahk' Tiliw Chan Chaak was about 13, his mother was the one who publicly celebrated the half-k'atun anniversary of 9.14.10.0.0 (October 11, 721) with the erection of Stela 24, suggesting she was serving as his regent at that time. However, she may never have been the formal head of government; Stela 24 described K’ak’ Tiliw Chan Chaak as the 38th head of Naranjo's government, whereas it should count him as the 39th if Six Sky were included.

== Rediscovery in the 20th century ==
Tatiana Proskouriakoff first recognized the name of the queen in the 1960s during her pioneering studies of the historical side of Maya inscriptions. She nicknamed the queen "Lady of Tikal" because of the use of the Mutal emblem glyph; it was not until later that scholars realized more than one city used the same glyph.

== In popular culture ==
- Lady Six Sky leads the Mayan civilization in the New Frontier season pass of the 4X video game Civilization VI.
- She appears in the game Heroes of History by InnoGames.
- She is the subject of the 2012 historical fiction Lady Six Sky by Elaine Lowe and has been depicted in contemporary art by Miguel Omaña.
