= Dos Pilas =

Maya settlement site in Petén, Guatemala

- Mutul
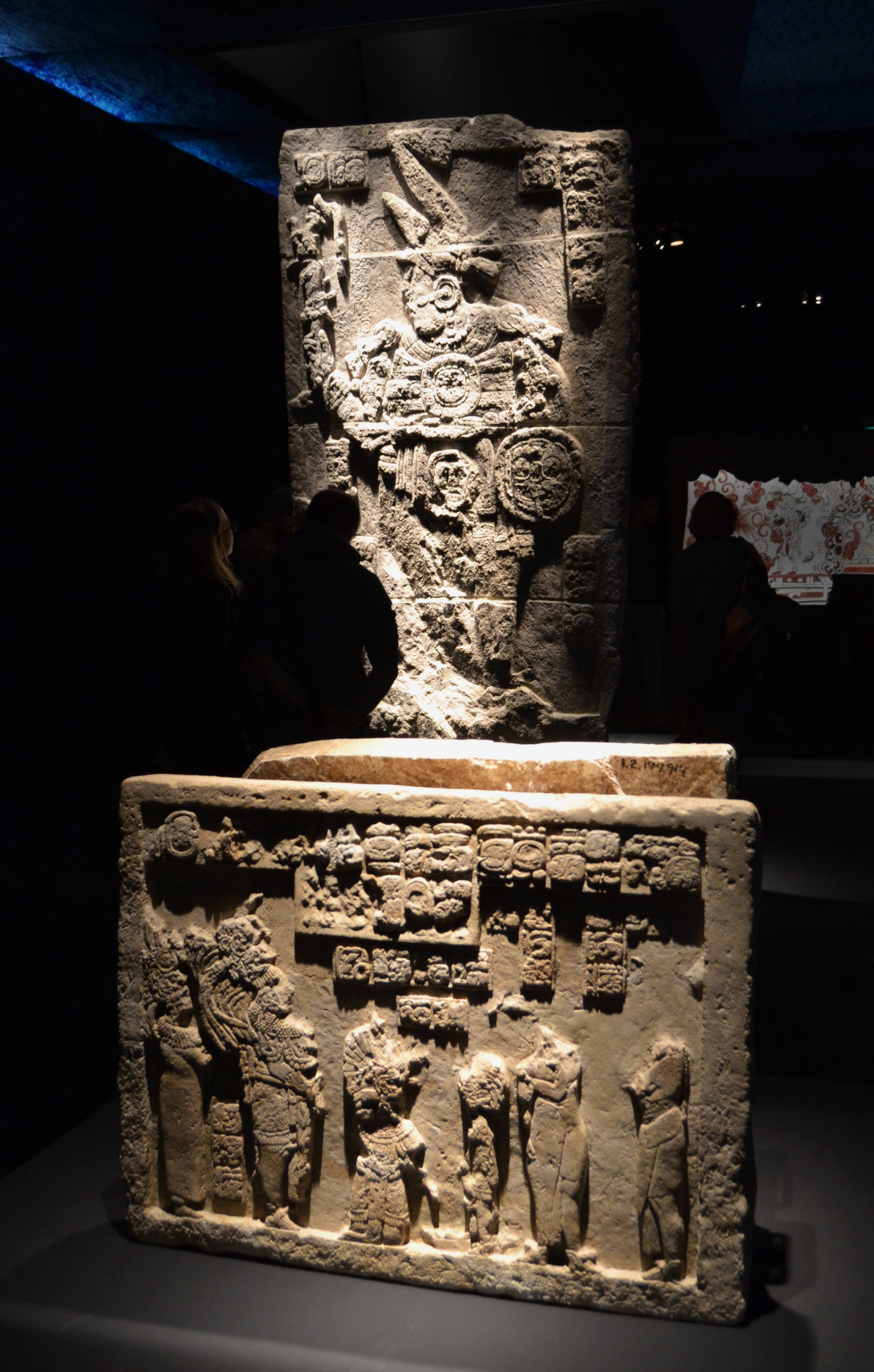
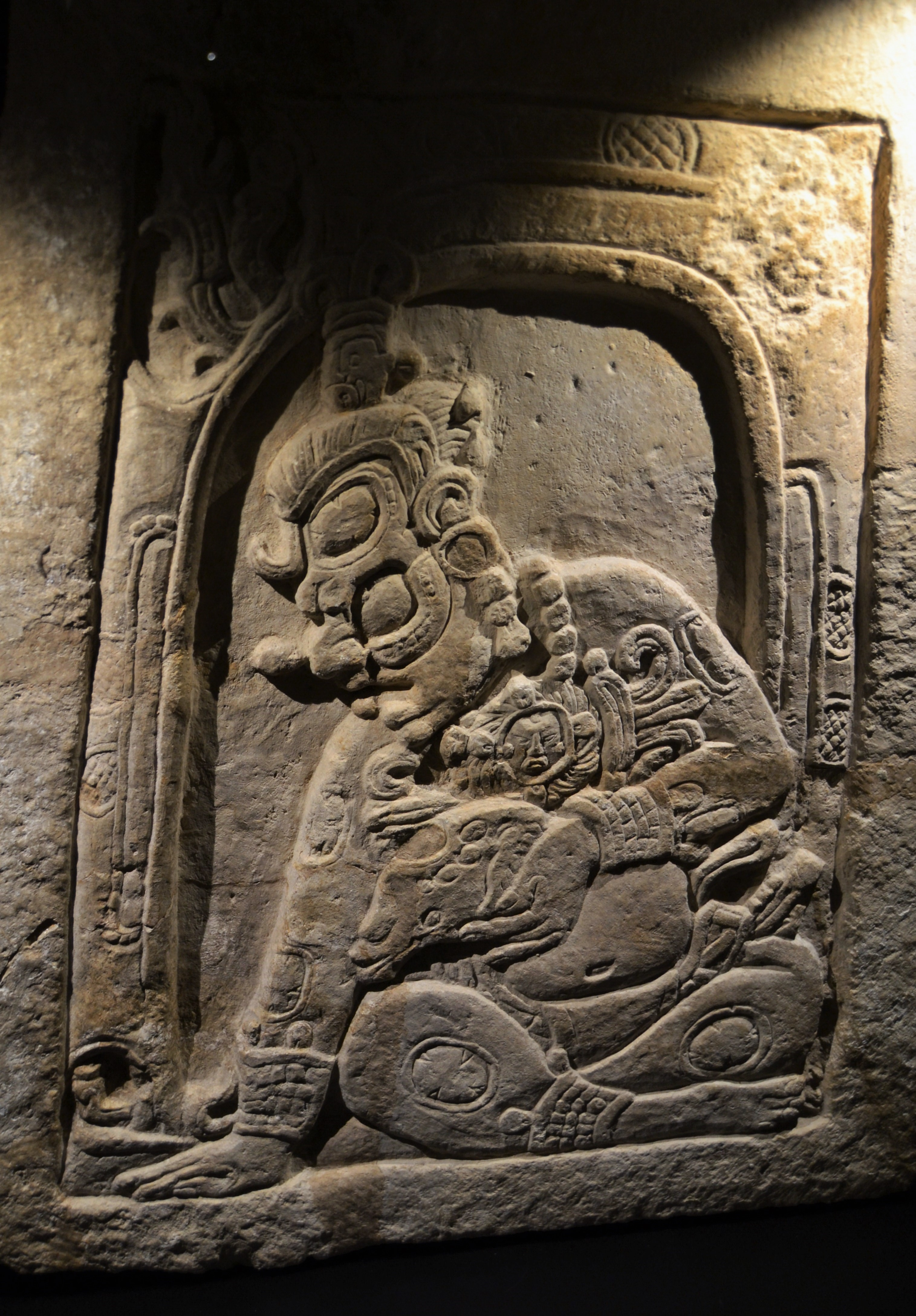
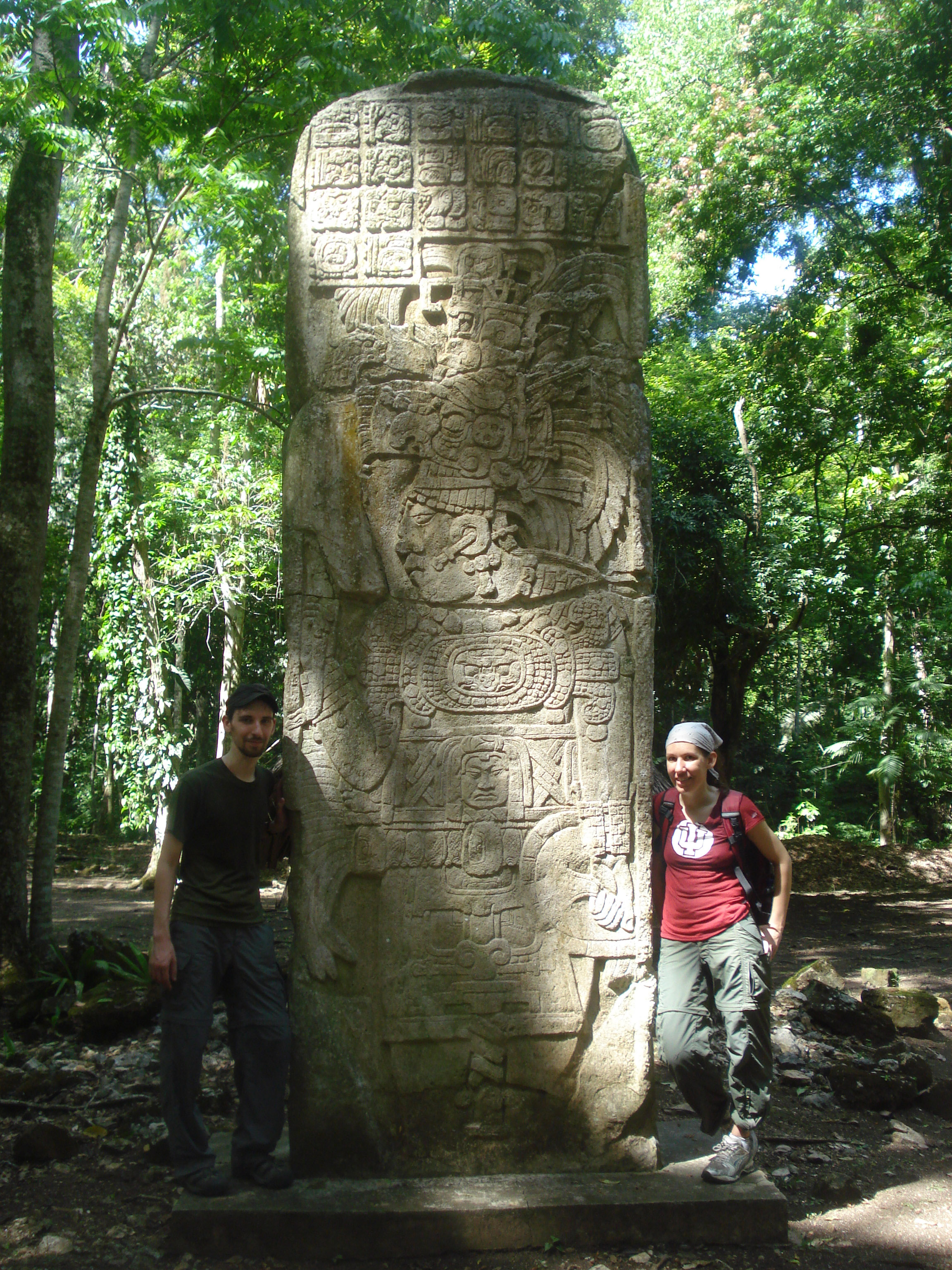
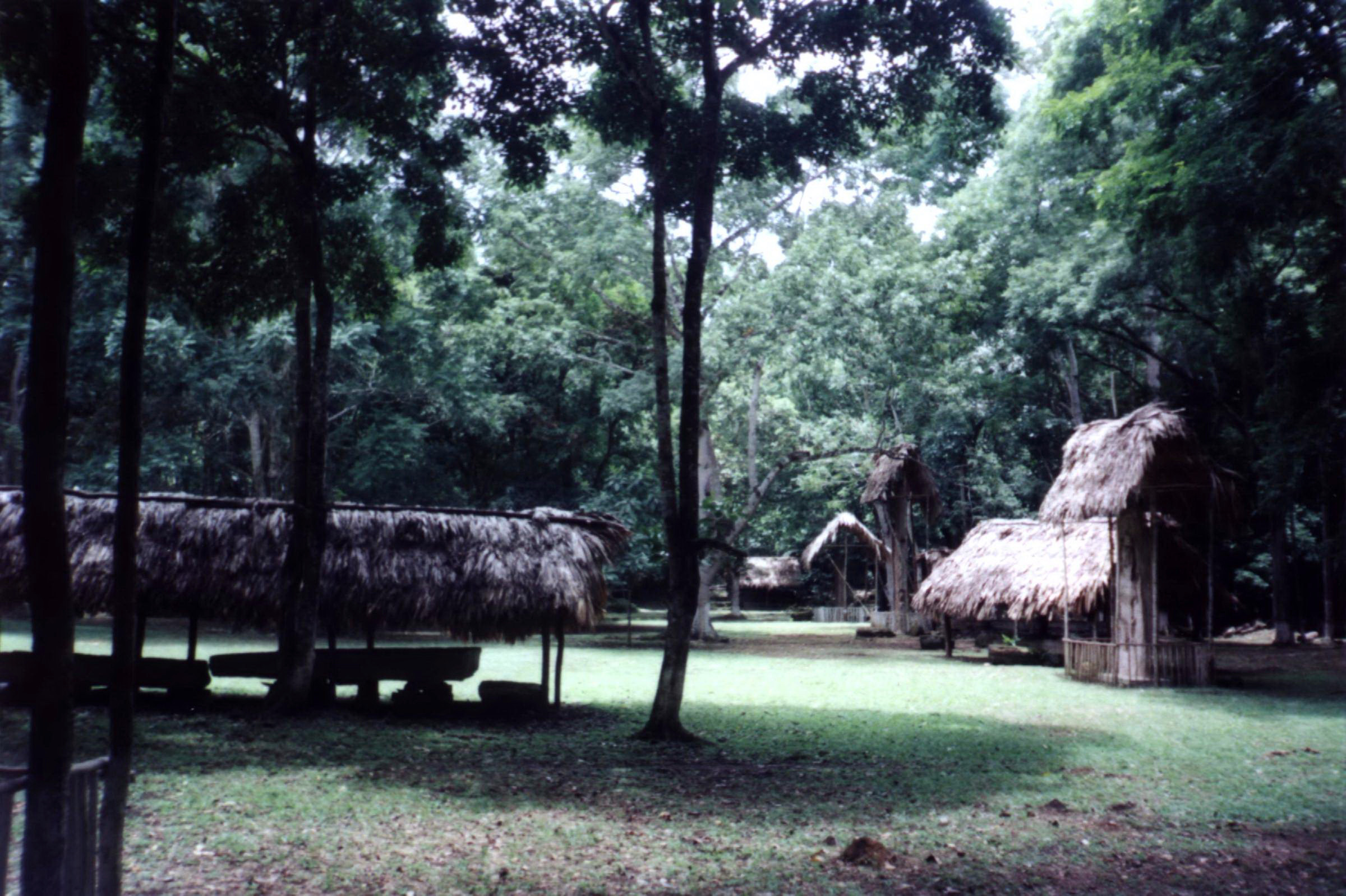
- K'awiil Chan K'inich in his first blood sacrifice ritual The sun god, Kinich Ahau Stele where King K'awiil Chan K'inich appears Archaeological site of Dos Pilas

- Location within Mesoamerica Location within Guatemala
- 16°26′45″N 90°17′45″W
- Periods: Classic Periods
- Cultures: Maya
- Location: Sayaxché
- Region: Petén Department, Guatemala

History
- Built: Early Classic (629 A.D.)
- Abandoned: Terminal Classic (761 A.D.)

Site notes
- Architectural styles: Preclassic and Classic Maya
- Excavation dates: 1989–1994
- Responsible body: IDAEH

Dos Pilas is a Pre-Columbian site of the Maya civilization located in what is now the department of Petén, Guatemala. It dates to the Late Classic Period, and was founded by an offshoot of the dynasty of the great city of Tikal in AD 629 in order to control trade routes in the Petexbatún region, particularly the Pasión River. In AD 648 Dos Pilas broke away from Tikal and became a vassal state of Calakmul, although the first two kings of Dos Pilas continued to use the same emblem glyph that Tikal did. It was a predator state from the beginning, conquering Itzan, Arroyo de Piedra and Tamarindito. Dos Pilas and a nearby city, Aguateca, eventually became the twin capitals of a single ruling dynasty. The kingdom as a whole has been named as the Petexbatun Kingdom, after Petexbatún Lake, a body of water draining into the Pasión River.

Dos Pilas gives an important glimpse into the great rivalries and political strife that characterised the Late Classic. Much of the history of Dos Pilas can now be reconstructed, with a level of detail which is almost unparalleled in the Maya area.

On June 12, 1970, the site was declared a National Monument according to Article 1210 of the Guatemalan Ministry of Education.

== Etymology ==
Dos Pilas is Guatemalan Spanish for two wells (or water containers), and this is the generally accepted meaning of the name, even though early investigator Pierre Ivanoff stated that it meant two stelae. The emblem for the site and/or the polity of Dos Pilas is the same as that of Tikal, Mutul. Its exact meaning is obscure but the drawing suggests a hair knot.

== Location ==
Dos Pilas is located in the Petexbatún region of the Petén Basin, in the southwest of the department of Petén, in northern Guatemala. It lies between the Pasión and the Salinas rivers. The site has an elevation of 160 metres (525 ft) above mean sea level. Dos Pilas falls within the municipality of Sayaxché, a town on the banks of the Pasión River. Dos Pilas lies about 8 kilometres (5.0 mi) east of the border with Mexico, 120 kilometres (75 mi) to the southwest of the Maya ruins of Tikal, and 10 kilometres (6.2 mi) west of Tamarindito. Lake Petexbatún and the Pasión River form a part of the drainage of the Usumacinta River.

At the height of its power the kingdom covered an area of some 1,500 square miles (3,885 square km).

The local landscape consists of heavily forested ridges interspersed with low lying wetlands, rivers and lakes. The area is subject to high annual rainfall, averaging 2,500 mm (98.4 in).

== Known rulers ==
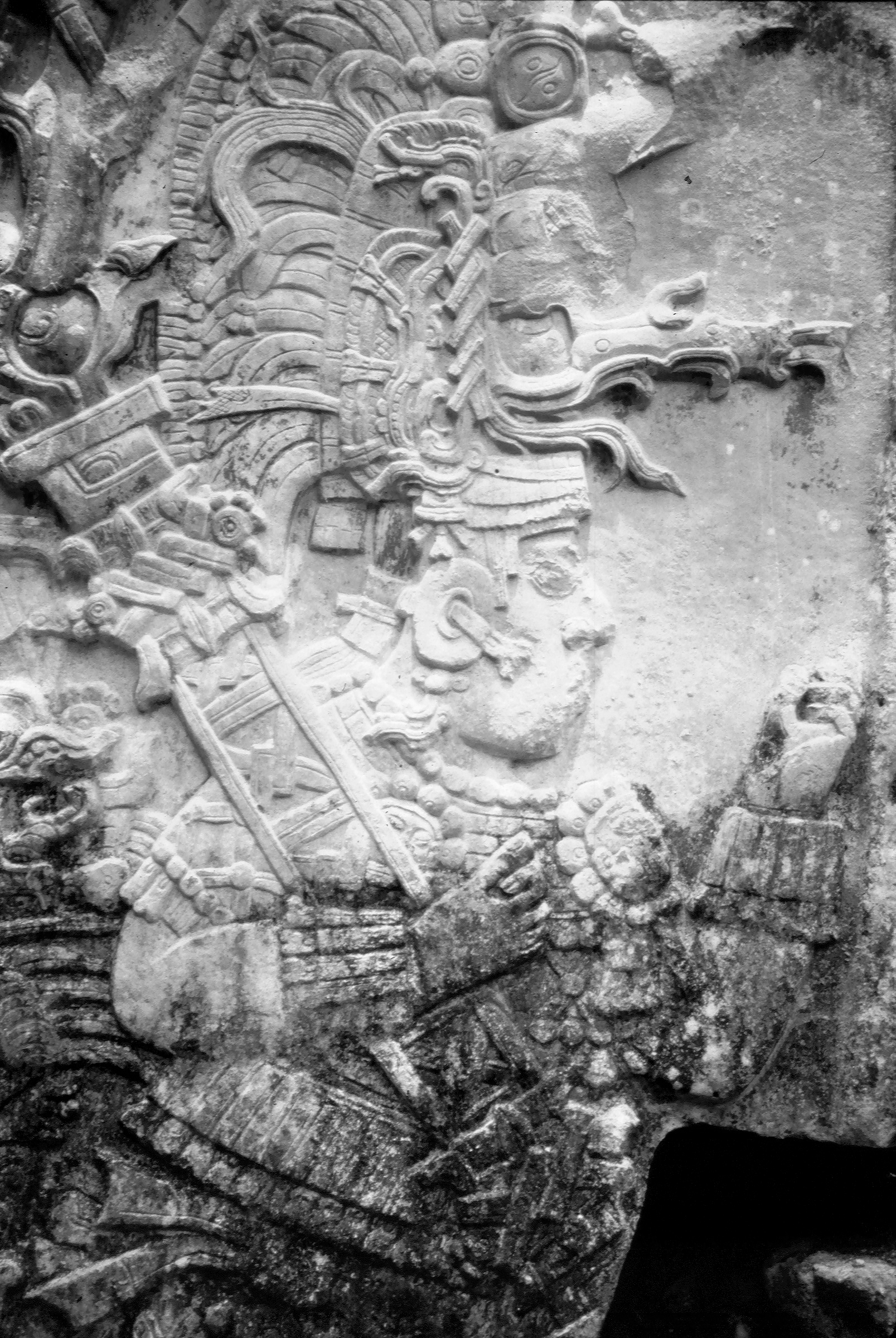
Panel 10 from Dos Pilas was originally a stela from neighbouring Arroyo de Piedra that was moved to Dos Pilas and re-erected after Dos Pilas conquered that city.

Name (or nickname)	Ruled	Alternative Names
Bʼalaj Chan Kʼawiil	c. 648–695	Ruler 1, Flint Sky, Flint Sky God K, Lightning Sky, Malah Chan Kʼawil
Itzamnaaj Bʼalam	c. 695	Shield Jaguar
Itzamnaaj Kʼawiil	24 March 698 – 22 October 726	Ruler 2, Shield God K
Uchaʼan Kʼin Bʼalam	6 January 727 – 28 May 741	Master of Sun Jaguar, Ruler 3, Scroll-head God K, Spangle-head, Jewelled Head
Kʼawiil Chan Kʼinich	23 June 741 – 761	Ruler 4, God K Sky, Mahkʼina

Bʼalaj Chan Kʼawiil (Ruler 1) (c. 648–692+) was born on 15 October AD 625. He claimed to be a member of the Tikal royal line. On Dos Pilas Panel 6 he names a king of Tikal as his father. He probably saw himself as the legitimate heir to the Tikal throne and defected from Tikal in AD 648 to found Dos Pilas as a rival kingdom under the overlordship of Calakmul. Bʼalaj Chan Kʼawiil is known to have taken two wives, one of them from the nearby Petexbatún kingdom of Itzan. His father was Kʼinich Muwaan Jol II, who was either the 23rd or 24th ruler in Tikalʼs dynastic line. A daughter of Bʼalaj Chan Kʼawiil, Wak Chanil Ajaw, left Dos Pilas to found a dynasty at Naranjo.

Itzamnaaj Bʼalam (c. 697) had a short reign. He was the son of Bʼalaj Chan Kʼawiil and his wife from Itzan.

Itzamnaaj Kʼawiil (Ruler 2) (698–726), another son of Bʼalaj Chan Kawiil, was born in AD 673, probably in Calakmul during his familyʼs exile after Dos Pilas was defeated by Tikal. His birth abroad seems to have been cause for embarrassment, with discrepancies in the calendar dates recorded on monuments likely to be the result of attempts to show that he was born in Dos Pilas itself. He reigned for 28 years. He died on October 726. A stele erected by his successor records that he was buried four days later, at night and within Dos Pilas. A tomb believed to be that of this king was found under Structure L5-1 in the site core.

Uchaʼan Kʼin Bʼalam (Ruler 3, "Master of Sun Jaguar") (727–741) seems not to have been a direct heir to the throne but rather a regent providing strong leadership while the heir was still a child. Twenty years before his rise to the throne he was already a prominent figure in Dos Pilas, responsible for the capture of the lord of Tikal in AD 705 and being closely involved in rituals performed by the previous king. Uchaʼan Kʼin Bʼalam took a wife from Cancuén, a city that controlled the upper reaches of the Pasión River. "Master of Sun Jaguar" died in May 741, his death is recorded on Stela 1 at his twin capital of Aguateca where it is believed that he was buried, although his tomb has not yet been found.

Kʼawiil Chan Kʼinich (Ruler 4) (741–761+) was installed on the throne of Dos Pilas in June of AD 741, 26 days after the death of "Master of Sun Jaguar". It is not known when he died but he was forced to flee Dos Pilas in AD 761 and was never mentioned again after that.

== History ==
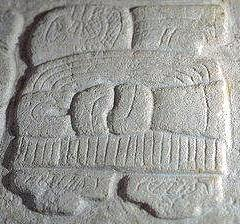
The Mutal emblem glyph shared by Dos Pilas and Tikal.

=== Early history (pre-A.D. 629) ===
The early history of the Dos Pilas site is unclear; there are traces of an earlier indigenous dynasty predating the arrival of Bʼalaj Chan Kʼawiil from Tikal. From the Early Classic the Petexbatún region had been dominated by a Maya kingdom centred on the sites of Tamarindito and Arroyo de Piedra. Bʼalaj Chan Kʼawiil founded Dos Pilas within the territory of this pre-existing kingdom and the new city quickly came to dominate the region.

=== Founding and consolidation ===
The interactions between Classic Period Maya city-states were deeply linked to the long-running power struggle between the two Maya "superpowers", Tikal and Calakmul, and the history of Dos Pilas is no exception.

==== 629: Aligned to Tikal ====
In AD 629, the Tikal king Kʼinich Muwaan Jol II installed his son Balaj Chan K'awiil, aged four, as ruler of Dos Pilas. With the establishment of the new kingdom, Dos Pilas advertised its origin by adopting the emblem glyph of Tikal as its own. For the next two decades he fought loyally for his brother and overlord at Tikal.

==== 648: Aligned to Calakmul ====
In AD 648, king Yuknoom Chʼeen II ("Yuknoom the Great") of Calakmul attacked and defeated Dos Pilas, capturing Balaj Chan K'awiil. At about the same time, the king of Tikal was killed. Yuknoom Cheʼen II then reinstated Balaj Chan Kʼawiil upon the throne of Dos Pilas as his vassal. In an extraordinary act of treachery for someone claiming to be of the Tikal royal family, he thereafter served as a loyal ally of Calakmul, Tikalʼs sworn enemy. The exact methods used by Calakmul to induce Balaj Chan Kʼawiil to switch sides are unknown.

==== 672: Recovered by Tikal ====
King Nuun Ujol Chaak of Tikal attacked and captured Dos Pilas in AD 672, driving Bʼalaj Chan Kʼawiil into a five-year exile, probably in Calakmul.

==== 677: Restored to Calakmul ====
This exile was only ended in AD 677, on the same day that Calakmul celebrated a success over Tikal, revealing Bʼalaj Chan Kʼawiilʼs obvious dependency on his foreign overlord.

Tikal and Dos Pilas went to battle again in AD 679 and Tikal suffered a humiliating defeat by its smaller rival. Although Dos Pilas celebrated this as the victorious conclusion of the war, neither side had gained any real advantage over the other. For Dos Pilas, this battle represented the consolidation of its kingdom and the failure of Tikal to crush its splinter state before it gained a foothold. The hieroglyphic texts at Dos Pilas describe the victory in graphic terms, recording "pools of blood" and "piles of heads" as the result of a major battle between the two cities, with Dos Pilas very likely having received military aid from Calakmul. Bʼalaj Chan Kʼawiil consolidated his power with marriage alliances. He took at least two wives; his main wife was a noblewoman from Itzan, another city in the Pasión drainage. Their marriage produced Balaj Chan Kʼawiilʼs heirs, Itzamnaaj Balam and Itzamnaaj Kʼawiil. Balaj Chan Kʼawiil had a famous daughter with a second wife, this daughter was Lady Six Sky who was despatched to Naranjo to refound its obliterated dynasty. Balaj Chan Kʼawiil is known to have made several further visits to Calakmul; in 682 he celebrated a period ending ceremony there under Yuknoom the Great and in 686 he attended the enthroning of his successor, Yuknoom Yichʼaak Kʼakʼ.

==== 695: Victory of Tikal over Calakmul ====
Calakmul and its allies suffered after the defeat of Calakmul by Tikal in 695, shifting the balance of power in the Maya lowlands. Around this time Balaj Chan Kʼawiil died and was succeeded by one of his sons, Itzamnaaj Balam, although the exact year is not clear from the hieroglyphic texts. Itzamnaaj Balam did not reign for long and he was replaced by his brother Itzamnaaj Kʼawiil in 698.

==== 705: Tikal defeated ====
The war with Tikal continued under the new king and in AD 705 Tikal was again defeated and its lord captured. This victory was overseen by Itzamnaaj Kʼaawiilʼs general Uchaʼan Kʼin Bʼalam, who would later become king himself. After this victory Dos Pilas benefitted from tribute in the form of labour and wealth, resulting in the rapid expansion of the city. At this time Itzamnaaj Kʼawiil ordered the building of the El Duende group centred on a sizeable temple on a hilltop east of the Main Group. Victories over unknown, presumably minor, enemies are recorded to have taken place in AD 717 and 721. Itzamnaaj Kʼawiil raised five stelae in the El Duende group to celebrate his military victories. Itzamnaaj Kʼawiilʼs died in 726 and was buried four days later, as recorded on Stela 8. A royal tomb excavated under Structure 5-1 is probably that of this ruler.

== Campaigns of aggression ==
Uchaʼan Kʼin Bʼalam was enthroned in 727, probably as regent for Kʼawiil Chan Kʼinich, Itzamnaaj Kʼawiilʼs young son and heir. By the 8th century AD, Dos Pilas was powerful enough to attack the much larger city of Seibal on the Pasión River. In AD 735 the Lord of Dos Pilas (Ruler 3, "Master of Sun Jaguar") attacked the city, capturing Yichʼaak Bʼalam, its king. The captive king was not executed but rather became a vassal under the lord of Dos Pilas. At about this time, the nearby site at Aguateca became a twin capital of the Dos Pilas kingdom, with victory monuments being erected simultaneously in both cities.

In AD 743 Kʼawiil Chan Kʼinich, went to war against the sites of Ahkul and El Chorro. Two years later, in AD 745, he went to war against the distant cities of Yaxchilán, on the Usumacinta River, and Motul de San José on Lake Petén Itzá. The capture of the lords of both cities, and also the lord of El Chorro, is depicted on Hieroglyphic Stairway 3.

Dos Pilas continued to exert control over Seibal even after the death of "Master of Sun Jaguar", with his successor Kʼawiil Chan Kinich presiding over rituals performed at the vassal site in AD 745–7.

== Collapse and abandonment ==
Ongoing conflict in the Maya region soon destabilised the whole area following the defeat of Dos Pilasʼ patron Calakmul and in 761 the city was dramatically abandoned after Tamarindito and other Petexbatún centres rebelled against their Dos Pilas overlord. A hieroglyphic stairway at Tamarindito mentions the enforced flight of Kʼawiil Chan Kʼinich, who was never mentioned again. The Dos Pilas royal family probably transported itself to the more defensible Aguateca, which lies only 10 km to the southeast. The violent end of Dos Pilas is evident from the smashed remains of a royal throne recovered from the Bat Palace. The entire Petexbatún region was engulfed by warfare in the late 8th century AD until almost all the settlements of the former Dos Pilas kingdom were abandoned. The monuments of Ixlú in the central Petén lakes region bear some hieroglyphic texts that closely resemble texts from Dos Pilas, suggesting that the lords of Ixlú may have been refugees from the collapse of the Petexbatún region.

A small group of refugees occupied Dos Pilas after its abandonment, throwing up hastily built defensive walls constructed from stone stripped from the deserted temples and palaces. These palisaded walls formed concentric patterns with no regard for the pre-existing architecture at the site. This village was overrun and itself abandoned in the early years of the 9th century AD, at which point the history of Dos Pilas as a settlement ends.

The collapse of the Dos Pilas state seems to have benefited other sites in the region, such as Itzan, Cancuén and Machaquila, which all demonstrate renewed strength coincident with the fall of the city.

Comprehensive excavations across the Petexbatún region have defined the core architectural sectors, subterranean karst networks, and emergency defensive modifications at Dos Pilas:

Architectural, Subterranean, and Defensive Profile of Dos Pilas
Sector / Subterranean Feature	Spatial Location & Topography	Primary Architectural & Cave Characteristics	Archaeological Evidence of Warfare & Abandonment
Main Group & LD-49 Pyramid	Site core on an east–west monumental axis	20-meter-high pyramid topped with three sanctuaries; includes Hieroglyphic Stairways 1 and 2	Concentric rubble and palisade walls hastily built over plaza floors using stripped facing stones from elite palaces.
Bat Palace (Murciélagos Group)	Midway between Main Group and El Duende (0.5 km east)	Exclusive elite residential compound enclosing a natural cave spring outlet marked by a shrine	Smashed royal throne indicating violent conquest and rapid evacuation of the ruling elite circa AD 761.
El Duende Complex & Cave Network	1 km east of the site core on a modified natural hill	Massive terraced hill with 5 stela-altar pairs; overlies the 1.5 km long Cueva de Río El Duende	Cave entrances deliberately blocked with architectural rubble and sterile clay as part of enemy termination rituals.
Cueva de Sangre (Cave of Blood)	2 km east of El Duende group	Subterranean cave system over 3 km long with four fortified surface entrances	Walled entry structures, heavy Preclassic ceramic offerings, and blocked tunnels marking sacred landscape destruction.

== Rediscovery and exploration ==
The ruins of Dos Pilas were first reported in 1953–4 by two brothers from Sayaxché, José and Lisandro Flores, but local residents probably already knew of their existence. Pierre Ivanoff lead an expedition to the site in 1960. He described the ruins, which he called Dos Pozos (two wells in Spanish) in his 1973 book Monuments of a Civilization: Maya, in which he claimed to have discovered the ruins.

Archaeologist Arthur Demarest of Vanderbilt University and Juan Antonio Valdés of the University of San Carlos of Guatemala started excavations at Dos Pilas in 1989. Hieroglyphic Stairway 4 was discovered in 1990 and a year later the tomb of Itzamnaaj Kʼawiil was excavated. The project continued through to 1994, supported by the National Geographic Society, the Instituto de Antropología e Historia (IDAEH - Institute of Anthropology and History), Vanderbilt University and several other organisations.

== The site ==
Dos Pilas is a modest sized site, covering about 1 square kilometre (0.39 sq mi). It was founded in an area with little previous occupation at a distance of only 4 km from the pre-existing settlement at Arroyo de Piedra. The general preservation of the site is poor due to the desperate stripping of stone from the principal buildings in order to build defensive walls immediately prior to the complete abandonment of the site. Hieroglyphic inscriptions at the site have been identified as belonging to the Chʼolan Maya language.

The site is laid out around three monumental complexes aligned upon an east–west axis, in a form that is reminiscent of the Preclassic layouts at El Mirador and Nakbe in the far north of Petén. The Main Group is the westernmost of the monumental complexes, while the El Duende group is the easternmost.

A series of concentric rubble walls were built immediately before the cityʼs abandonment, surrounding the Main Group and the El Duende Group. These hastily built fortifications were topped with a wooden palisade.

=== Main Group ===
The Main Group was laid out around a central plaza by Bʼalaj Chan Kʼawiil. Stelae 1 and 2 are located in the centre of the plaza. Stela 1 depicts an elaborately attired Itzamnaaj Kʼawiil and dates to AD 706. It records the defeat of a Tikal lord and contains the last known reference to that city so far recovered from inscriptions at Dos Pilas. Stela 2 is badly damaged and depicts the defeat of Yichʼaak Bʼalam of Seibal by "Master of Sun Jaguar". The plaza is enclosed on all four sides by structures; at least two of the surrounding structures were accessed via hieroglyphic stairways. South of the main plaza are a series of smaller elevated plazas with more restricted access, bordered by multi-roomed buildings. A further two hieroglyphic stairways have been found in this area.

- L4-35 is a structure located on the west side of the plaza. At its base is Hieroglyphic Stairway 1, which records events during the life of Itzamnaaj Kʼawiil.

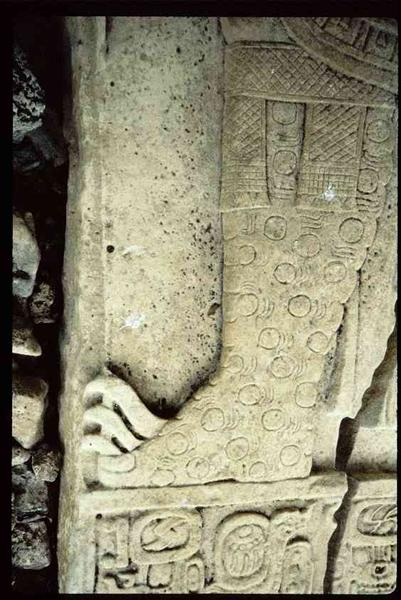
Stela 5, Detail showing a jaguar skin

- LD-49 (also referred to as L5-49) is a large pyramid to the south of the plaza and is topped by three temple sanctuaries. The pyramid is the largest structure in the site core and rises about 20 meters over the plaza. This pyramid's main stairway (known as Hieroglyphic Stairway 2) contains at least eighteen hieroglyphic steps, describing the arrival and life of Bʼalaj Chan Kʼawiil. The discovery of eight new hieroglyphic steps in 2001–2002 and their interpretation lead to a complete reevaluation of the early history of the site, throwing light upon the wider Maya politics involved with the break from Tikal, formerly seen as an internal affair. The steps currently in situ are replicas put in place after looters stole a section of Step 6 containing four glyphs in January 2003. The original steps were removed to a secure location. Flanking the stairway at the east and west ends are Panel 6 and Panel 7, both bearing hieroglyphic inscriptions. The well-preserved Panel 10 is located part of the way up the east side of the pyramid. Panel 10 was originally a stela at Arroyo de Piedra, it was moved and re-erected here after Dos Pilas conquered its neighbour.
- LD-25 is a temple pyramid built by Kʼawiil Chan Kʼinich. Hieroglyphic Stairway 3 is located 120 meters south of the southeast corner of the plaza, it is a part of this structure and describes some of this kingʼs victories in AD 743 and 745.
- Structure L5-1 is a ruined building on the east side of the plaza containing a vaulted crypt 9 meters beneath its summit. Inside were found the remains of an individual wearing a heavy jade collar and wristlets accompanied by offerings of fine painted ceramics and almost 400 pieces of shell mosaic that once formed a headdress. Due to the nearby Stela 8, positioned in front of this structure and containing a text relating the life, death and burial of king Itzamnaaj Kʼawiil, the tomb is presumed to be that of this king.
- The palace of Bʼalaj Chan K'awiil was torn down by the last inhabitants of Dos Pilas in order to build defensive walls immediately prior to the abandonment of the city. It lies about 100 meters south of the plaza, behind Structure LD-49. Hieroglyphic Stairway 4 is located on the east side of the destroyed palace and was discovered when the defensive wall that crosses it was being excavated. Hieroglyphic Stairway 4 details the history of Bʼalaj Chan K'awiil and the founding of the Dos Pilas dynasty.
- A ball court lies at the northeast corner of the plaza. The structures forming its sides are designated as L4-16 and L4-17. These structures bear the heavily eroded Panel 11 and Panel 12, both of which show a standing lord wielding a spear.

=== El Duende group ===
The El Duende group lies about 1 km to the east of the site core. This group was built by Itzamnaaj Kʼawiil after his victory over Tikal in 705. El Duende is the largest pyramid in the city, built by enlarging and terracing a natural hill some way from the site core, giving the impression of a single massive structure. The terraces supported five stelae and altar pairs, commissioned by Itzamnaaj Kʼawiil in the early 8th century AD. During excavations in 1991, a sinkhole near the western limit of the El Duende complex discovered a 1.5 km long cave that passes directly under the temple, which was named Cueva de Río El Duende (River Cave of El Duende) by archaeologists. Within the cave were found abundant artifacts and human bones. Smaller buildings flank the main platform.

=== Bat Palace ===
The Bat Palace (also known as the Murciélagos Group, from murciélago, Spanish for "bat") lies halfway between the site core and the El Duende group, being 0.5 km to the east of the main plaza and 0.5 km to the west of the El Duende pyramid. The Bat Palace was the political centre of Dos Pilas from AD 725 until the city was abandoned in AD 761. Excavations of the Bat Palace revealed that it was an exclusive, closed elite compound with ritual significance, with a cave entrance emerging within the palace and being marked by a shrine with offerings over the buried entrance. The Bat Palace is believed to have been the most important elite area of Dos Pilas during the reigns of the last two rulers of the city. The entrance to the palace complex was flanked by two small temples built of masonry, leading to two courtyards. The courtyards were enclosed by masonry buildings with perishable roofs. A smashed royal throne was found in the Bat Palace, evidence of the violent conquest of the city in the Late Classic.

=== Monuments ===
Stela 8 was raised in front of Structure L5-1. Its text describes the principal events of king Itzamnaaj Kʼawiilʼs life, and mentions his death and burial in AD 726.

=== Caves ===
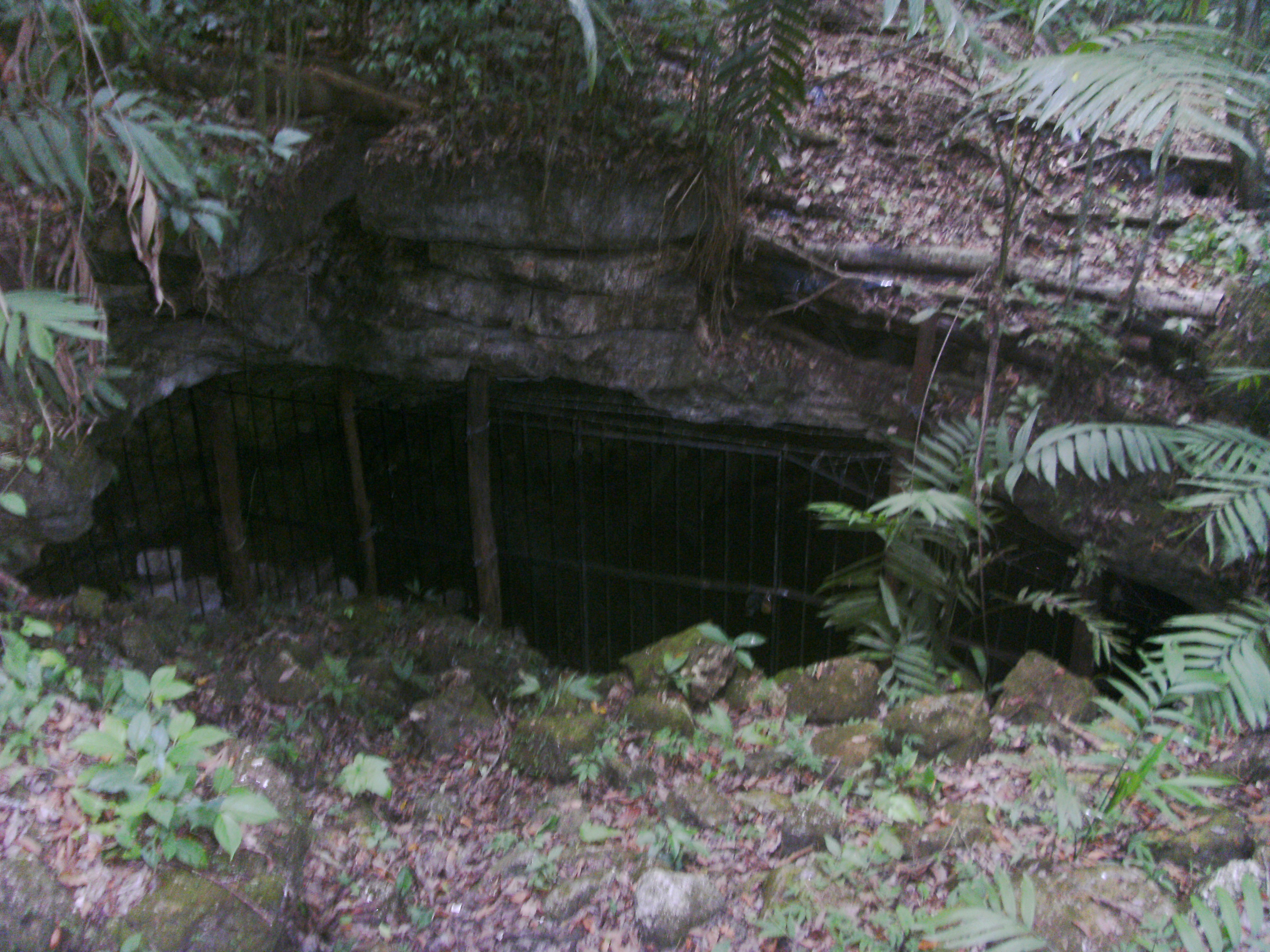
Cave entrance near El Duende

During excavations, a total of 22 caves were located in the immediate vicinity of the Dos Pilas, totaling over 11 km in length. There are five major caves; Cueva de El Duende, Cueva de Río El Duende, Cueva de Río Murciélagos, Cueva de Sangre and Cueva de Kaxon Pec. Only these major caves were excavated and the offerings recovered from these caves included a sizeable amount of Preclassic pottery. The strong Preclassic traces found in the caves would imply that the caves were important long before the warlike Dos Pilas state was founded in the Late Classic. All the major architecture at Dos Pilas dates from the Late Classic and is aligned with important cave systems, showing that the builders of the city incorporated a thousand-year-old sacred landscape into the design of their city.

On the hill forming the base of the El Duende group were erected several stelae containing toponym glyphs. One of these glyphs refers to water and the cave contains an underground lake directly underneath the hill, making it likely that the toponym is referring to this particular body of water. The fact that the El Duende group were originally named after this subterranean water source demonstrates how important this cave was to the ancient inhabitants of Dos Pilas.

The entrance to the Cave of Bats (Cueva de Río Murciélagos) lies 75 meters to the northwest of the Bat Palace. Although relatively dry in the dry season, after rainfall water can pour out through the cave mouth at a rate of 8m³/second, creating enough noise to be heard in the main plaza 500 meters away. Although the seasonal flow of water has washed away almost all archaeological remains from the cave, archaeologists consider that the Cave of Bats was of ceremonial importance to the inhabitants of Dos Pilas due to the dramatic torrent that flows through it in the wet season.

Investigation of the various caves at Dos Pilas revealed that all of the larger caves were part of a single drainage system and that the Cave of Bats is the drainage outlet for the system, this cave therefore being connected to the Cueva de Río El Duende. A continuation of the Cave of Bats was found to emerge inside the Bat Palace, where it was marked by a shrine.

A plaza group directly overlies the principal chamber of the Cueva de El Duende (not to be confused with the similarly named Cueva de Río El Duende), which lies just southwest of the El Duende pyramid. A 2 metres (6 ft 7 in) deep midden was discovered in this cave showing heavy use during the Preclassic and Classic periods. A ceramic vessel bearing the earliest dynastic text yet recovered from Dos Pilas was found in this midden. A thick cap of sterile yellow clay covers much of the floor of the main chamber, it appears to have been deliberately deposited in order to cover the entrance to the caveʼs longest tunnel, which passes underneath the El Duende pyramid and connects with the Cueva de Río El Duende. In the entrance of the cave were found large quantities of rubble, much of it consisting of finely dressed stone that had been stripped from nearby buildings and used to block the cave entrance. James E. Brady believes that the blocking of this sacred cave was a part of a termination ritual carried out by the conquerors of Dos Pilas, who also blocked the entrances of the Cueva de Sangre (Cave of Blood) and possibly the western entrance of the Cueva de Río El Duende, suggesting that the caves were enormously important.

The Cueva de Sangre (Cave of Blood) is located about 2 km east of the El Duende group, it has more than 3 kilometres (1.9 mi) of tunnel running underneath a small hill. The cave has four entrances, two of which had been blocked with rubble as at Cueva de El Duende. The west entrance appears to have been the principal entrance used by the ancient inhabitants of Dos Pilas. A small building was built above this entrance, the function of this building must have been linked to the use of the cave itself. A stone wall enclosed both the cave entrance and the building itself. Preclassic ceramic fragments were found inside the Cueva de Sangre.

== See also ==
- List of Mesoamerican pyramids
