= List of rivers of Guatemala =

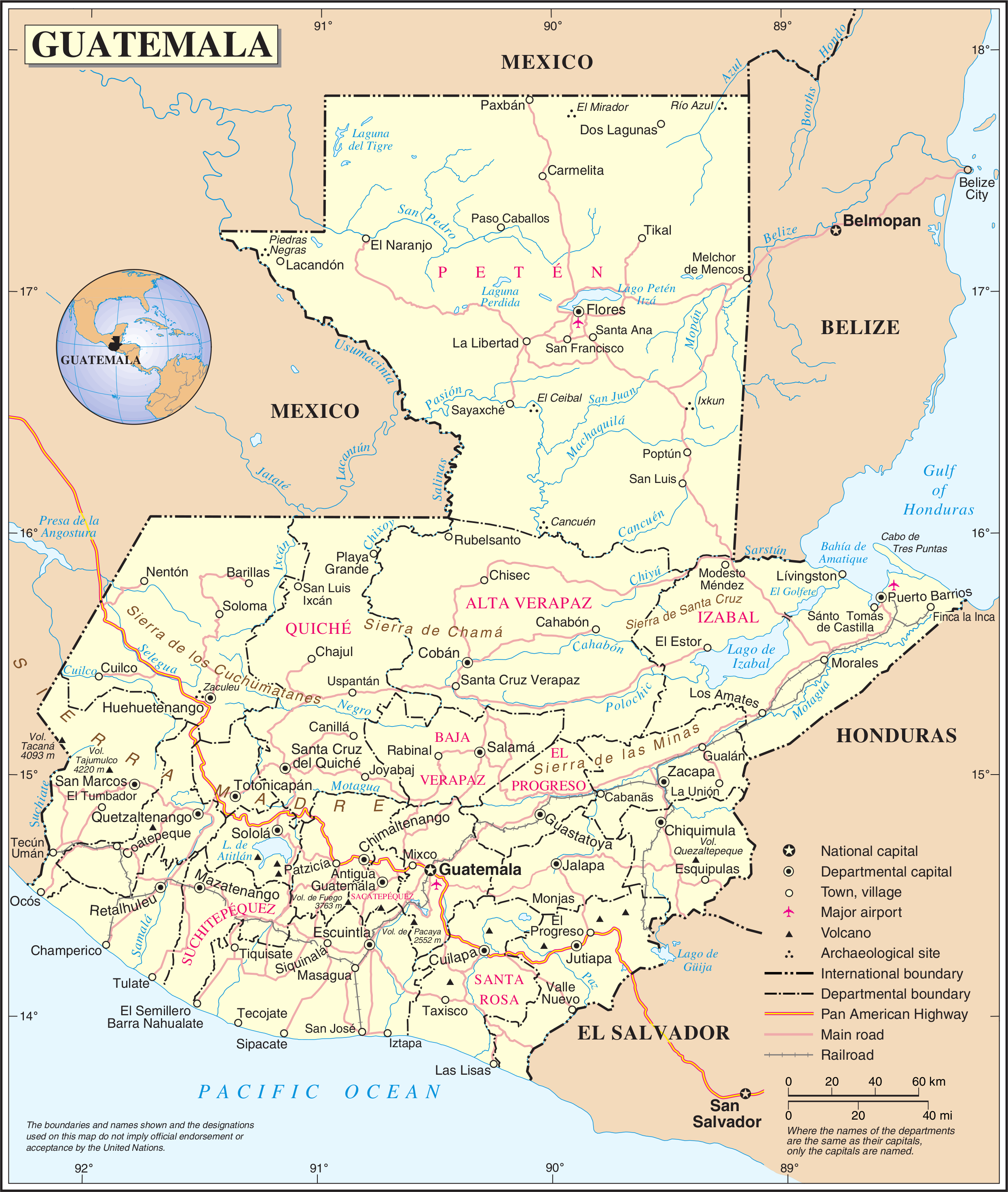
Map of Guatemala

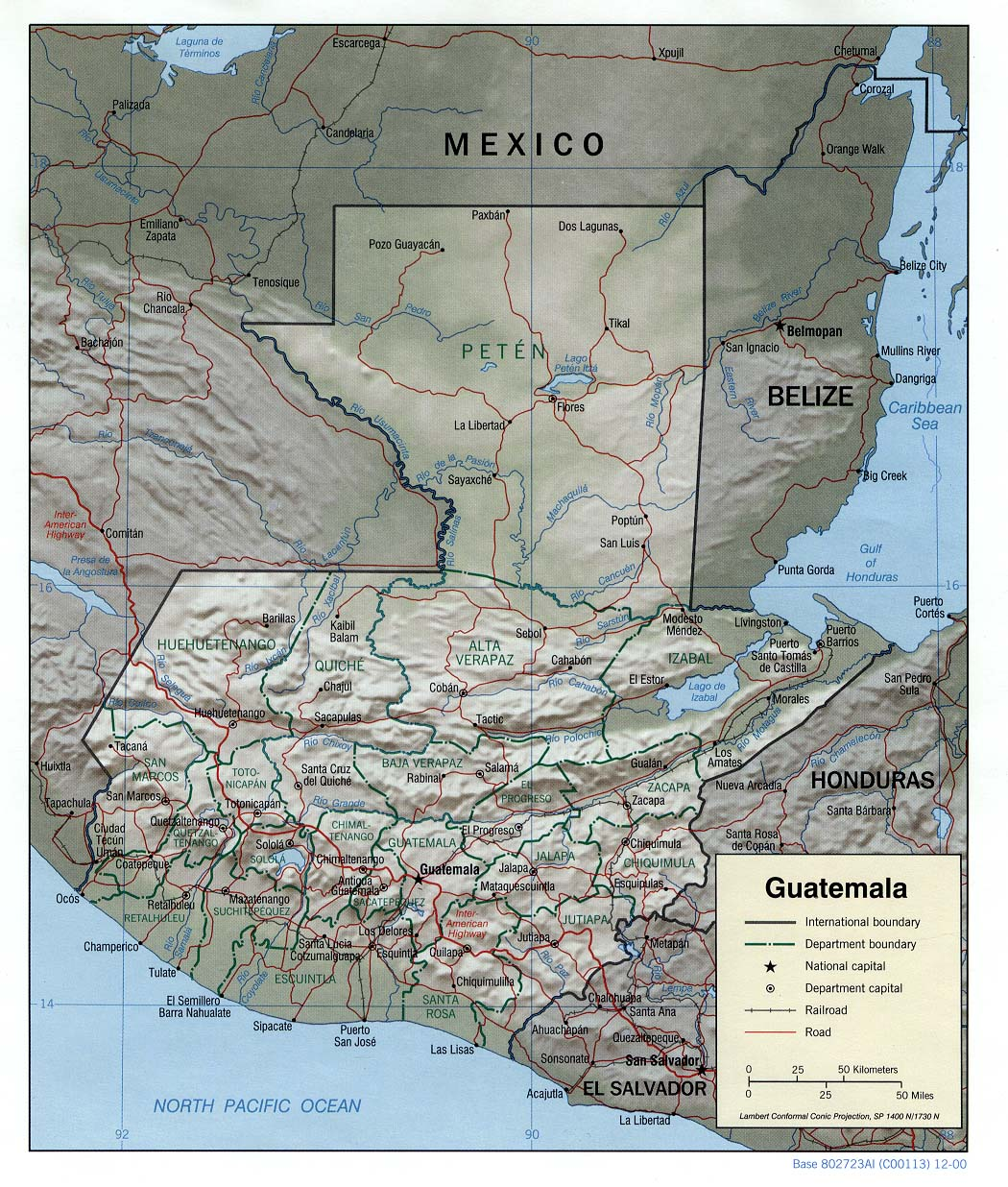
CIA Map of Guatemala

This is a list of rivers in Guatemala arranged by drainage basin. This list is arranged by drainage basin, with respective tributaries indented under their larger stream's name.

== Gulf of Mexico ==
The following rivers flow into the Grijalva River in Mexico and are part of the Gulf of Mexico drainage basin.

- Grijalva River (Mexico)
  - Usumacinta River (Guatemala and Mexico)
    - San Pedro River (Guatemala and Mexico)
    - Lacantún River (Mexico)
      - Xalbal River (Xaclbal River)
      - Ixcán River
    - Pasión River (Río de la Pasión)
      - San Juan River
        - Poxte River
      - Machaquila River
      - Cancuén River
    - Salinas River
      - Chixoy River (Río Negro)
        - Salamá River
      - San Román River
  - Seleguá River (Guatemala and Mexico)
    - Nentón River (Guatemala and Mexico)
  - Cuilco River (Guatemala and Mexico)
    - Cabajchum River
      - Tzalá River
    - Las Manzanas River
      - Blanco River (San Marcos)

== Gulf of Honduras ==
The following rivers are in the Gulf of Honduras drainage basin, which connects to he Gulf of Mexico.

- Hondo River (Río Azul) (Belize and Mexico)
- Belize River (Belize)
  - Mopan River (Guatemala and Belize)
- Moho River (Guatemala and Belize)
- Sarstoon River (Sarstún River) (Guatemala and Belize)
  - Gracias a Dios River
    - Chiyu River
    - Chahal River
  - Franco River
    - Chocón River
- Dulce River
  - Chocón Machacas River
  - Lake Izabal
    - Polochic River
      - Matanzas River
      - Cahabón River
        - Lanquin River
- Motagua River (Guatemala and Honduras)
  - Las Animas River
  - Bobos River
  - Pasabien River
  - Río Grande de Zacapa
    - Jupilingo River
  - Las Vacas River
  - Jalapa River

== Pacific Ocean ==
The following rivers are in the Pacific Ocean drainage basin:

- Suchiate River (Guatemala and Mexico)
  - Cabúz River
    - Cutzulchimá River
  - Ixben River
  - Nica River
  - Petacalapa River
  - Sibinal River
- Naranjo River
  - Chisna River
    - Mujulia River
- Ocosito River
  - Nil River
    - Nima River
- Samalá River
  - El Tambor River
    - Nima I River
    - Nima II River
  - Oc River
- Icán River
  - Sís River
- Nahualate River
  - Ixtacapa River
  - Siguacán River
- Madre Vieja River
- Coyolate River
  - Xaya River
  - San Cristobal River
    - Pantaleón River
- Acomé River
- Achiguate River
- María Linda River
  - Aguacapa River
  - Michatoya River
    - Lake Amatitlán
      - Villalobos River
- Paso Hondo River
- Los Esclavos River
- Paz River (Guatemala, El Salvador)
- Lempa River (Guatemala, El Salvador, Honduras)
  - Ostúa River

== See also ==
- List of rivers of the Americas by coastline
