= San José La Máquina =

- Municipality
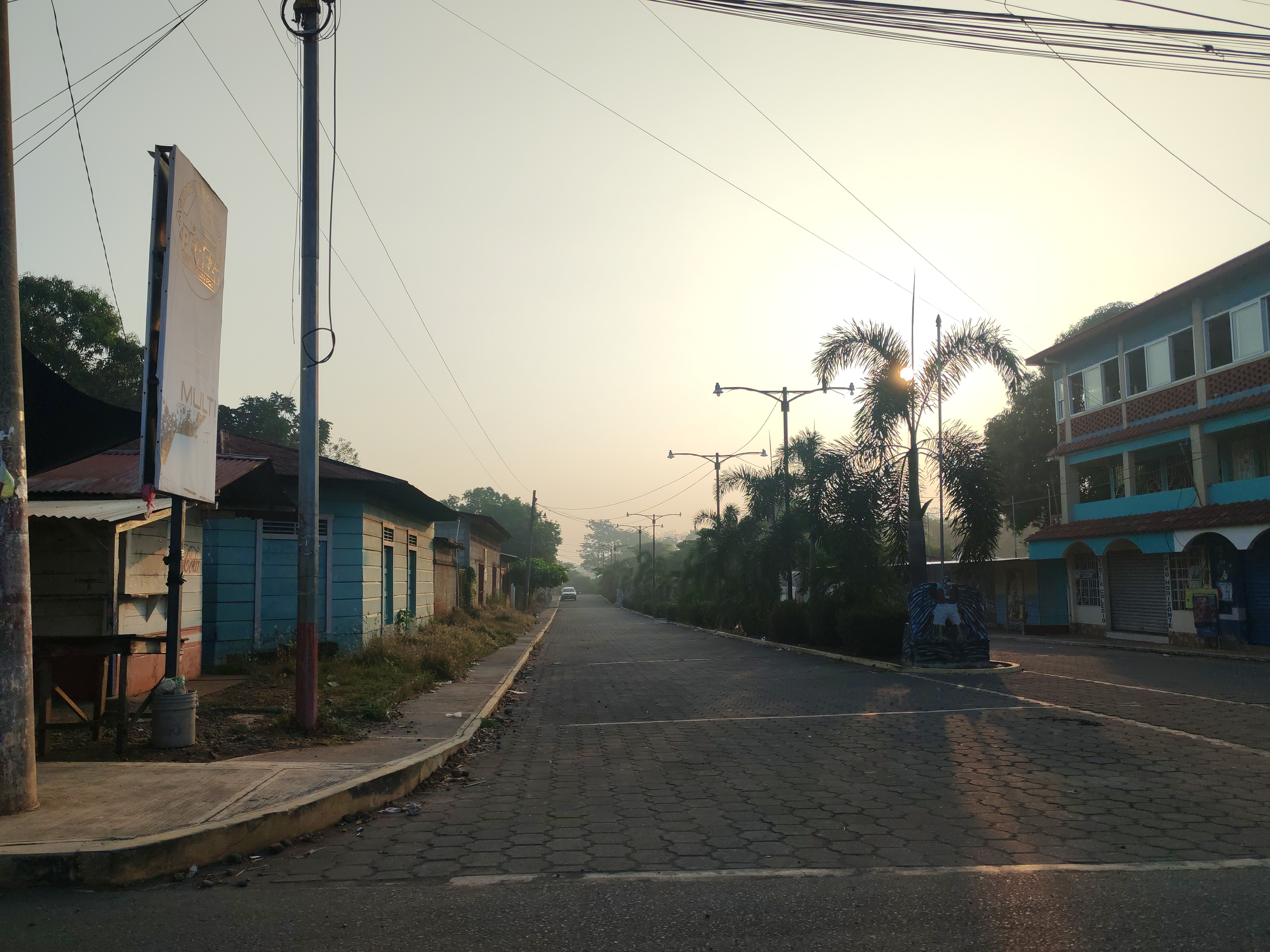
- Main Street of the City

- Location of San José La Máquina
- Coordinates: 14°18′N 91°34′W
- Country: Guatemala
- Department: Suchitepéquez
- Gazetted: 3 March 2014
- Seat: San José La Máquina

Government
  - Type: Mayor–council
  - Mayor: Alberto Martínez López

Area
  - Total: 147 km^{2} (57 sq mi)

Population (2018 Census)
  - Total: 23,062
  - Estimate (2018): 24,969
  - Density: 157/km^{2} (406/sq mi)
  - Seat: 2,646 (2015 projection)
- Time zone: UTC-6 (Central)
- Website: Official website

San José La Máquina is a municipality in the Guatemalan department of Suchitepéquez, located approximately 26 kilometres (16 mi) south of the departmental capital of Mazatenango.

== Geography ==
San José La Máquina is located on the Pacific coastal plain of southern Guatemala. It borders the Suchitepéquez municipalities of Cuyotenango to the north, San Lorenzo to the northeast, and Mazatenango to the southeast, and the municipality of San Andrés Villa Seca in Retalhuleu Department to the west. The municipality covers an area of 147 square kilometres (57 sq mi).

The terrain of San José La Máquina is flat, with an elevation ranging from 51 to 95 metres (167 to 312 ft) above sea level, and has been almost completely deforested for use as agricultural land.

San José La Máquina is irrigated by the Icán and Sís Rivers which form its eastern and western borders respectively. Both rivers have their source in the slopes of the Santo Tomás volcano, and are highly polluted from sewage and refuse.

San José La Máquina has a tropical savanna climate. The temperature varies from 21–24 °C (70–75 °F) in the wet season from May to October to 31–38 °C (88–100 °F) in the dry season from November to April. Annual precipitation is about 2,400 millimetres (94 in).

== History ==
San José La Máquina stands on land that was previously part of a guayacán-producing hacienda called "Trapiche Grande" which was owned by Queen Wilhelmina of the Netherlands. The land from this hacienda was expropriated from 1950 to 1955 as part of the Decree 900 land reforms, and divided between the departments of Suchitepéquez and Retalhuleu. The subdivision located in Suchitepéquez was given the name La Máquina ("the machine"), after a belt conveyor was found abandoned there on the road between Cuyotenango and Tulate. The machine was repaired by the locals and used to build access roads in the area.

From 1980 onwards, the local inhabitants made repeated efforts to elevate San José La Máquina to the level of a municipality. They finally succeeded on 12 February 2014, when the Congress of the Republic of Guatemala decreed its separation from the municipality of Cuyotenango. The decree was gazetted in the Diario de Centro América on 3 March 2014.

== Government ==
Alberto Martínez López has served as mayor of San José La Máquina since its establishment in 2014. He was reelected in 2016 and 2020.

== Demographics ==
In the 2018 Guatemalan Census, which had an estimated underenumeration rate of 9.0%, San José La Máquina recorded a total population of 23,062 inhabitants. The National Institute of Statistics subsequently estimated the population of San José La Máquina in 2018 to be 24,969.

The largest inhabited locality in the municipality is the municipal seat, also called San José La Máquina, with a projected population of 4396 in 2015.

Spanish is spoken by over 95% of the population.

== Culture ==
The most important festival in San José La Máquina is the feast day of Saint Joseph, which has been celebrated there since 1951.

== Economy and infrastructure ==
San José La Máquina's economy relies heavily on agriculture. The main cash crop is corn, followed by sesame and tobacco. Other crops of local significance include watermelons, bananas and peanuts. Cattle farming is also a major contributor to the municipal economy.

The road network of San José La Máquina is in poor condition. Departmental road SCH-7, the main thoroughfare in the municipality, is only partially paved. It connects Cuyotenango with the beach town of Tulate in San Andrés Villa Seca.
