= Poxte River =

Coordinates: 16°20′N 89°46′W

Location
- Country: Guatemala

Physical characteristics
- Source
  - location: Dolores Plateau

Basin features
- River system: Usumacinta

Poxte is a river and valley of the Maya Mountains in Guatemala. The valley is noted for numerous Maya sites such as Ixtutz and the Petén Caves. The river is located southwest of the Dolores plateau and northwest of Poptún, in the Guatemalan department of Petén. The source of the river is on the same plateau, near the villages of Boca del Monte and Santo Domingo. The river flows westwards through the similarly named hamlet of Poxte, it then disappears amongst the karst topography and resumes its course 7 kilometres (4.3 mi) to the west. It continues westwards into the San Juan River, a tributary of the Machaquila River. The Machaquila River feeds into the Pasión River, which flows into the Usumacinta River and the Gulf of Mexico. The upper reaches of the Poxte River shares its drainage with the Mopan River, which flows eastwards into the Caribbean Sea.

The Poxte River Basin measures 20 kilometres (12 mi) long and is 5 kilometres (3.1 mi) wide. The river valley drainage is broken and confused, and the land has been largely cleared of forest to graze cattle. The Poxte valley includes modern settlements of Las Nuevas Delicias, La Lucha, Santo Domingo and Boca del Monte. The valley encompasses the Maya archaeological sites of Chaquix, Curucuitz, El Eden 2, Ixcoxol 1, 2 and 3, Ixtutz, La Lucha, Machaca 2, Nocsos, Nuevas Delicias 1,2 and 3, Poxte 1 and 2, San Luis Pueblito and Tesik. It also includes the cave systems of Balam Na (also known as Sebanal).
