= Museo Regional del Sureste de Petén =

Archaeological museum in Dolores, Petén, Guatemala

Southeastern Petén Regional Museum
- Museo Regional del Sureste de Petén
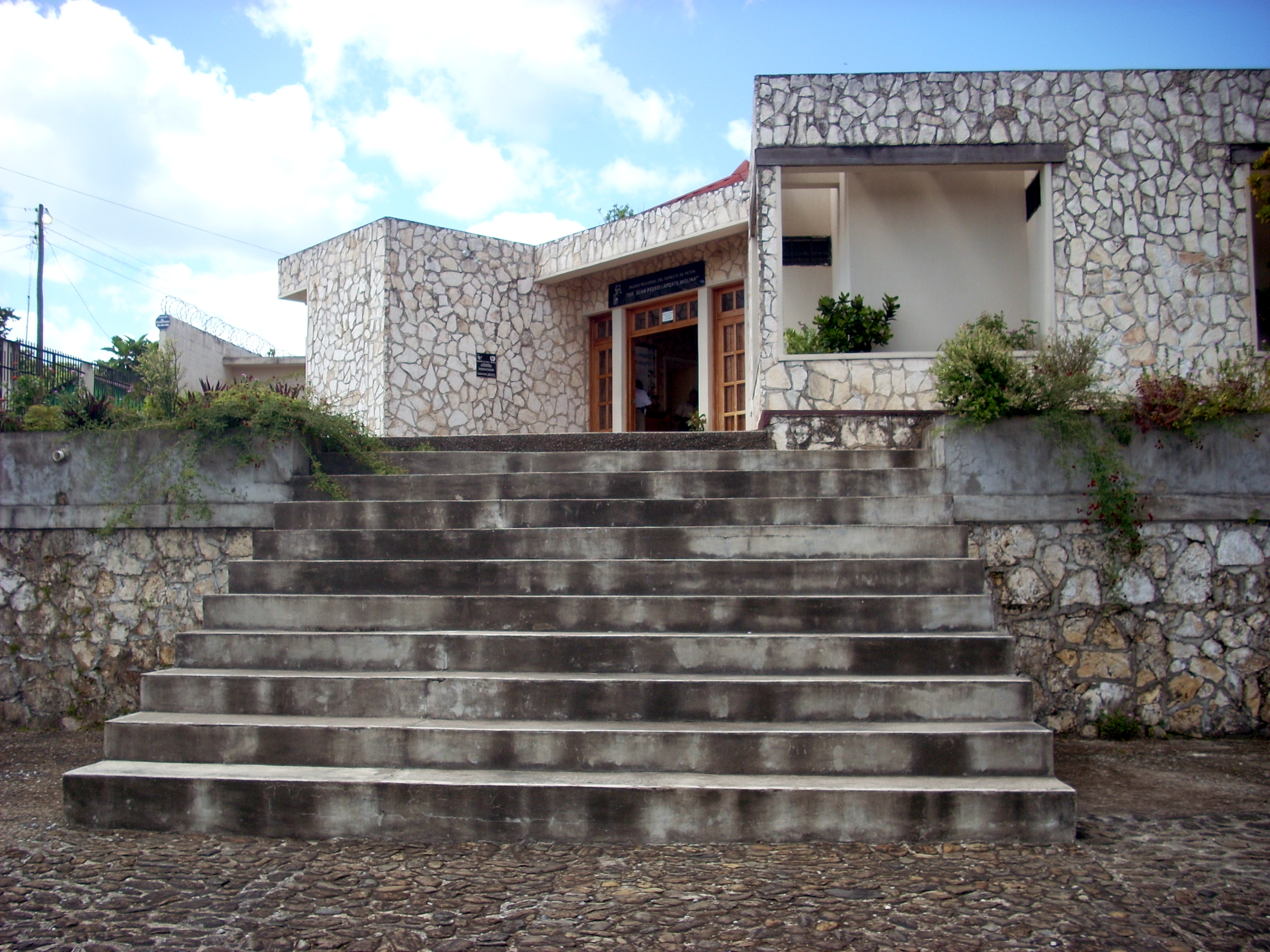
- Entrance to the museum
- Location: Dolores, El Petén, Guatemala
- Coordinates: 16°30′56.66″N 89°24′53.74″W
- Owner: Atlas Arqueológico de Guatemala

The Museo Regional del Sureste de Petén ("Southeastern Petén Regional Museum") is an archaeological museum in the town of Dolores in the Petén Department of Guatemala. The museum is located 82 kilometres (51 mi) from Flores, the departmental capital, among the Maya Mountains in an area rich in archaeological sites. It is open daily from 8am to 5pm.

The museum is operated by the Atlas Arqueológico de Guatemala ("Archaeological Atlas of Guatemala"), a part of the Dirección General del Patrimonio Cultural y Natural ("Department of Cultural and Natural Heritage"), under the Ministerio de Cultura y Deportes ("Ministry of Culture and Sports"). The collection consists of artefacts belonging to the ancient Maya civilization.

== Development ==
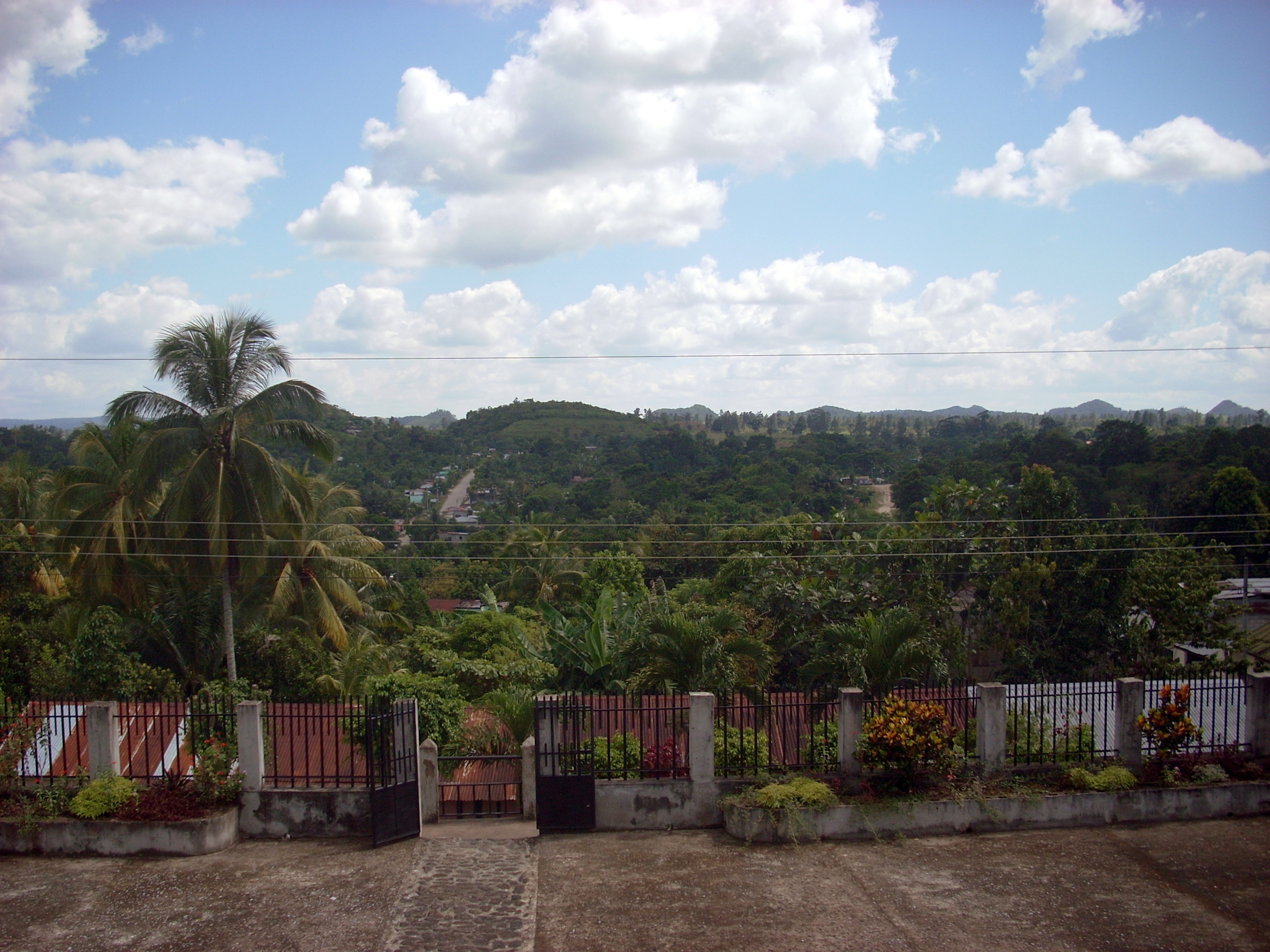
View across the museum courtyard over the town of Dolores

Construction of the museum was first proposed by the Dirección General de Caminos ("Highways Department") in 1998 as part of its plans to build a highway from San Luis to Flores in order to offset any damage to Guatemala's cultural heritage caused by the construction project. The land upon which the museum was built was donated in 1998, and had originally been used for the first seat of the municipal council. Construction began in December 1999, with the fabric of the building being completed in November 2000. In 2001, the Dirección General de Caminos officially handed the building over to the Ministerio de Cultura y Deportes.

In 2000, the Atlas Arqueológico de Guatemala petitioned the Agencia Española de Cooperación International ("Spanish Agency for International Cooperation") for funding to restore excavated artefacts ready for display in the museum. The agency responded positively and the Atlas Arqueológica was able to contract archaeologists from the Tikal National Park to carry out the restoration work. This restoration process lasted two years. The museum was officially opened on 17 March 2005 and is administered by staff of the Atlas Arqueológico de Guatemala.

== Facilities ==
The building consists of the exhibition halls, administrative facilities, a warehouse, guardroom, sanitary services and a community hall.

== Collection ==
The museum is dedicated to the display of objects excavated by the Atlas Arqueológico de Guatemala within the southeastern Petén region. It displays approximately 125 ceramic pieces and eight stone sculptures. The display of artefacts is divided into periods, ranging from the Late Preclassic through to the Postclassic, covering a span from 900 BC through to 1524 AD. The collection is not limited to the municipality of Dolores, it also includes pieces from the municipalities of La Libertad, Melchor de Mencos, Poptún, San Luis, Santa Ana and San Francisco. Twenty-two archaeological sites are represented at the museum, they include Calzada Mopan, Copoja, Curucuitz, El Chal, El Ocote, El Reinado, Itzimte, Ix Ak, Ixcoxol, Ix Ek', Ixkun, Ixtonton, Ixtutz, La Gloria-Sacul, Limones, Machaquila, Maringa, Pueblito, Sacul, Suk Che', Ucanal and Yaltutu. There are also pieces recovered from the caves of Aktun Ak'ab, Balam Na and El Chapayal.

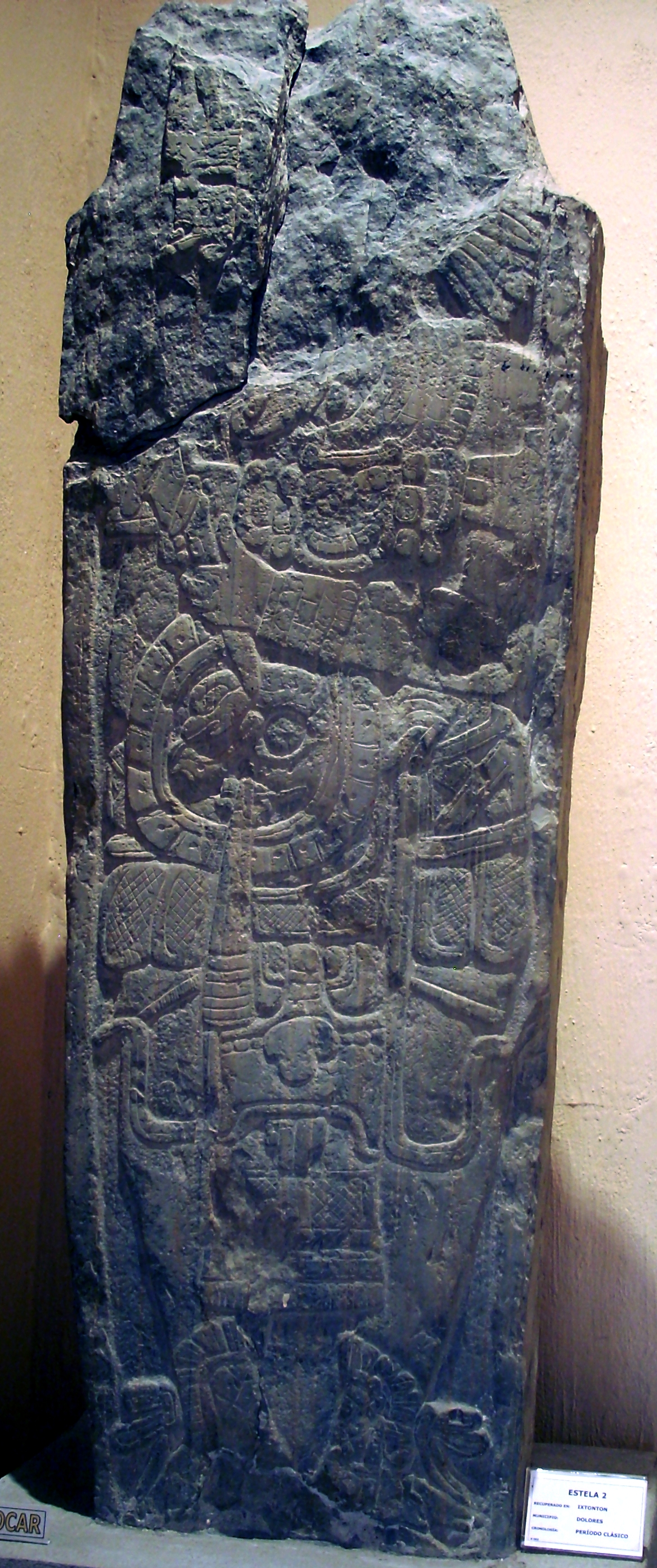
Stela 2 from Ixtonton

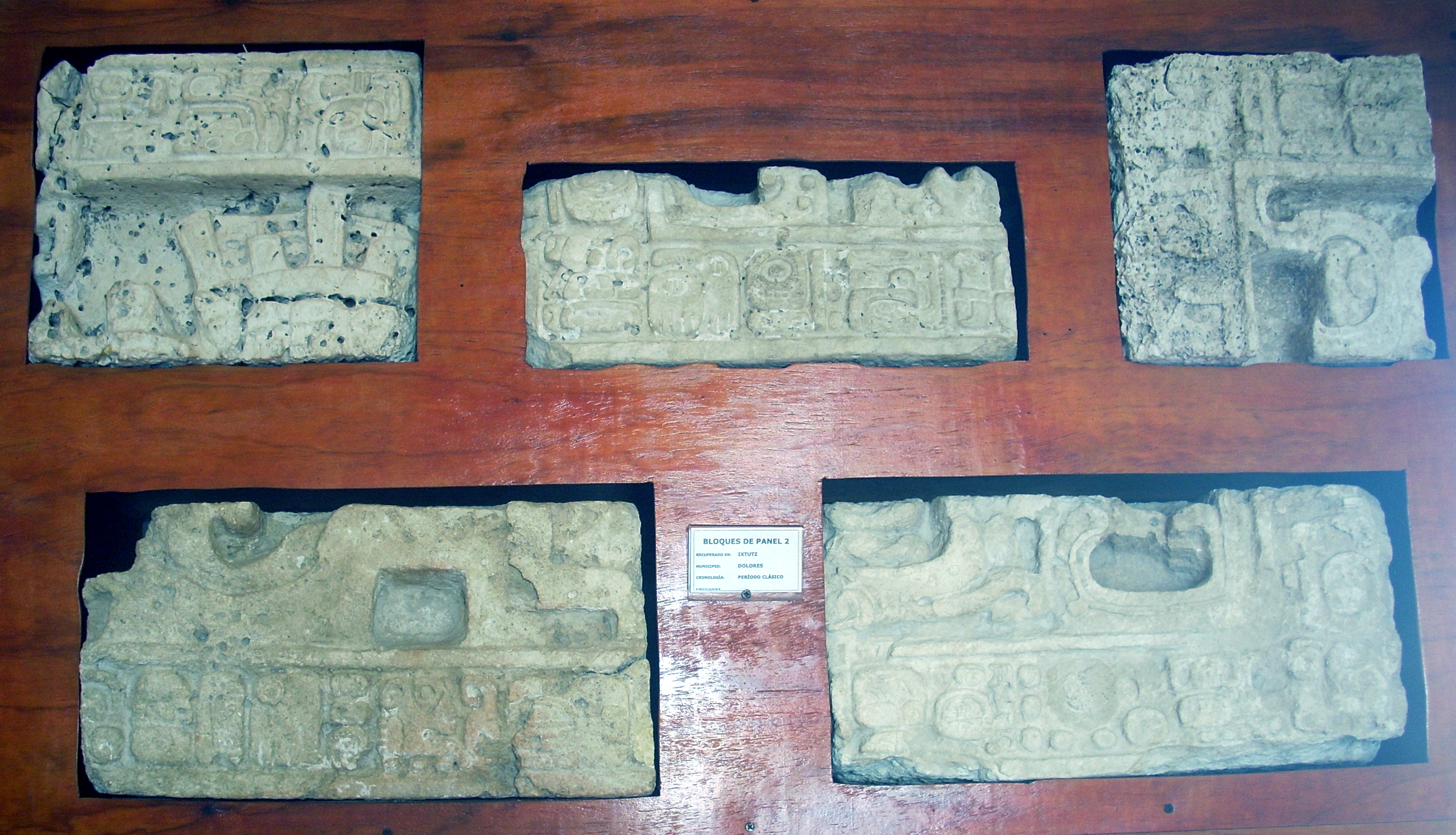
Fragments of Panel 2 from Ixtutz

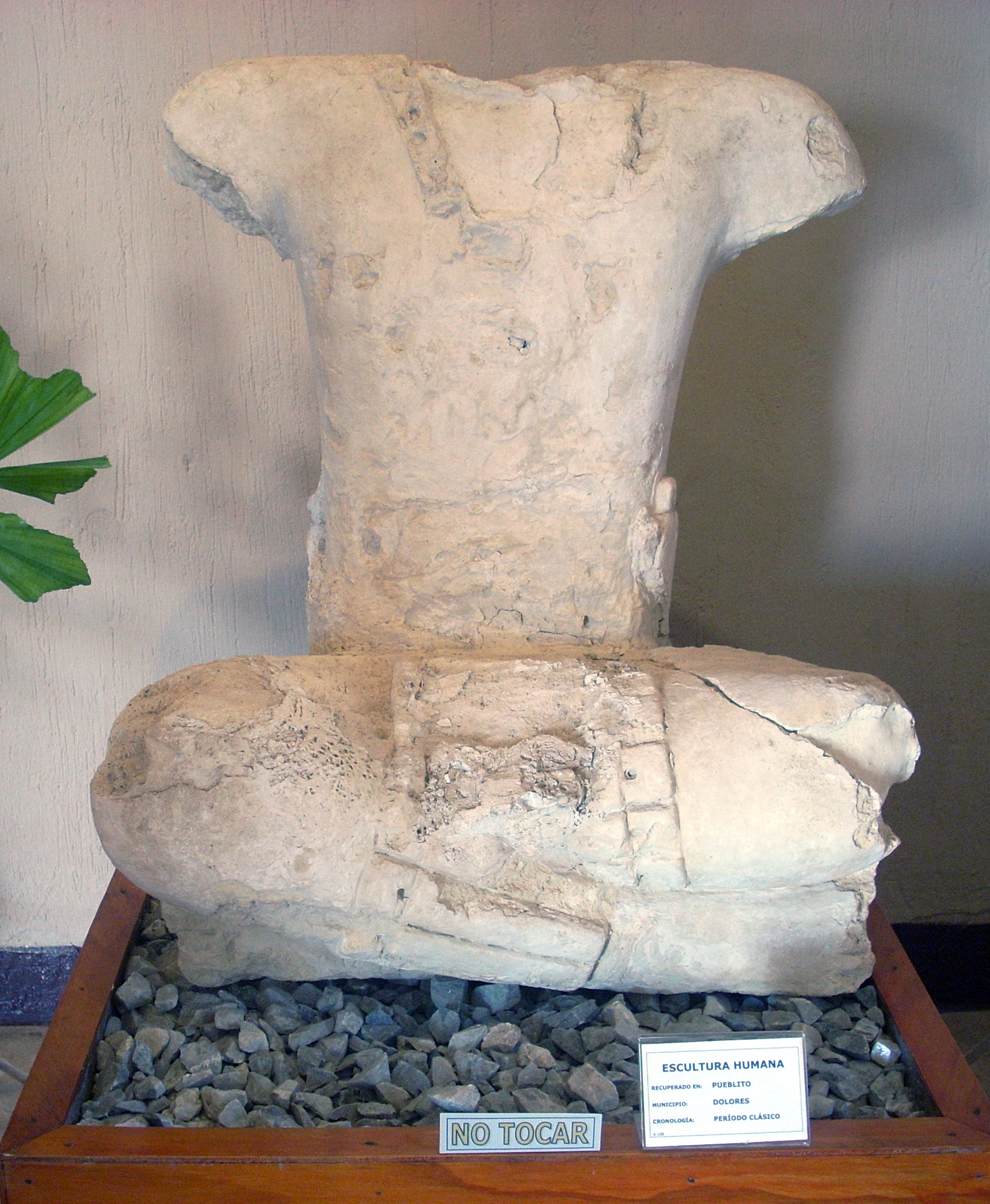
Sculpture from Pueblito

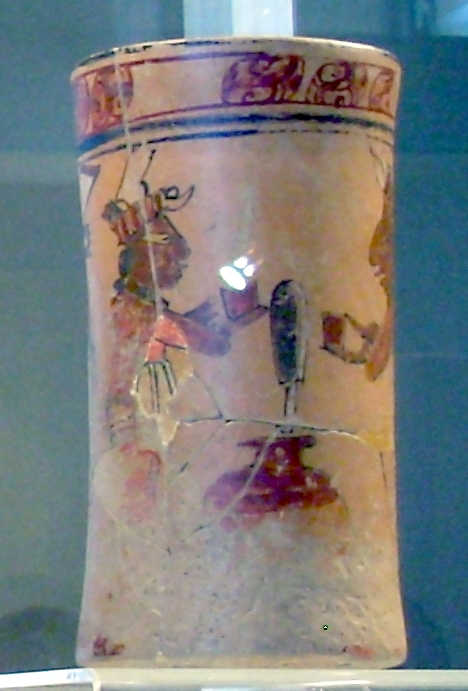
Late Classic vase from Ixtutz

=== Bowl from Suk Che' ===
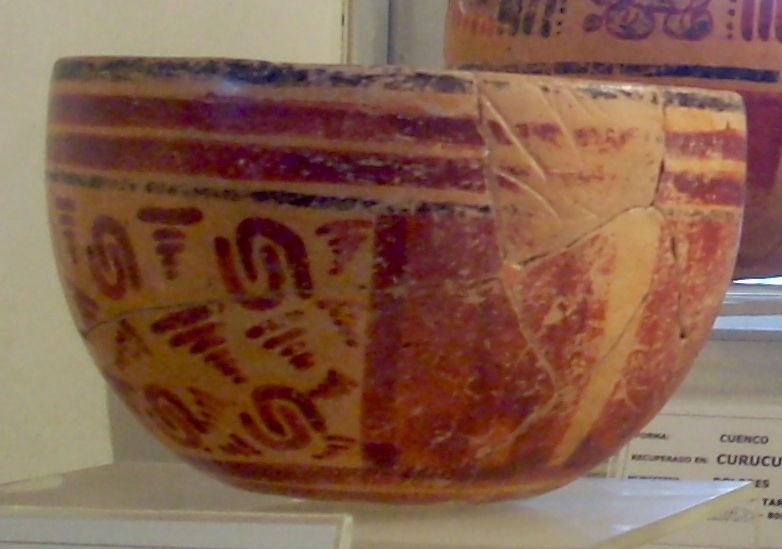

This artefact (catalogue number PSPA-507) is a flat based ceramic bowl of the Saxche variety of the Saxche Naranja Polychrome type, belonging to the Palmar-Danta ceramic group. It was excavated from Group 9 at Suk Che' and was associated with a burial. The bowl has been dated to the Late Classic Period.

=== Vase from Curucuitz ===
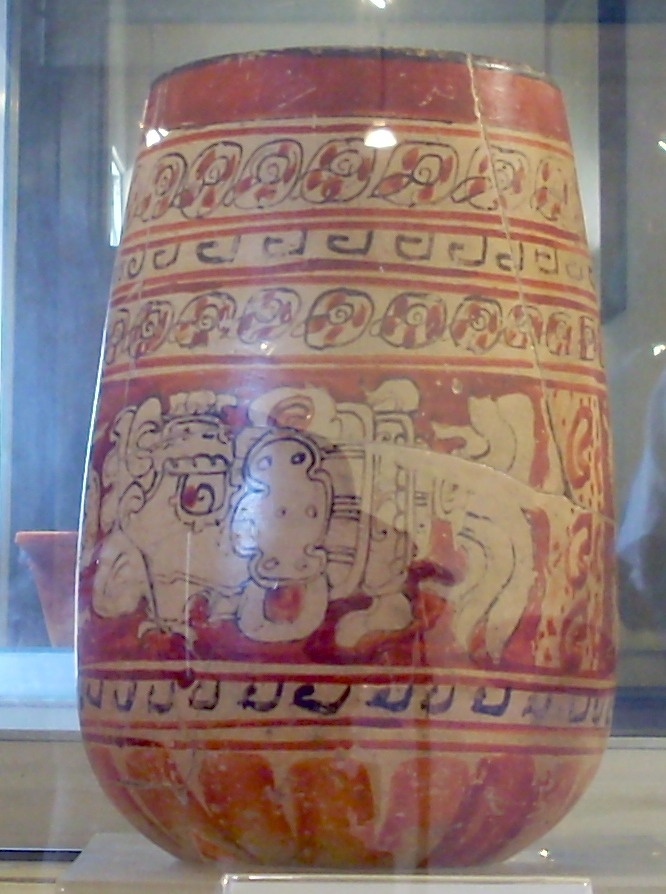

This item (catalogue number PSPA-625) is a ceramic vase excavated from the ruins of Curucuitz. It was found buried in the North Structure of Group 24, where it was associated with a burial. the vase has been dated to the Late Classic and is of the Paixban variety of the Paixban Ante Polychrome ceramic type, belonging to the Zacatal-Joyac ceramic group.

=== Vase from Sacul ===
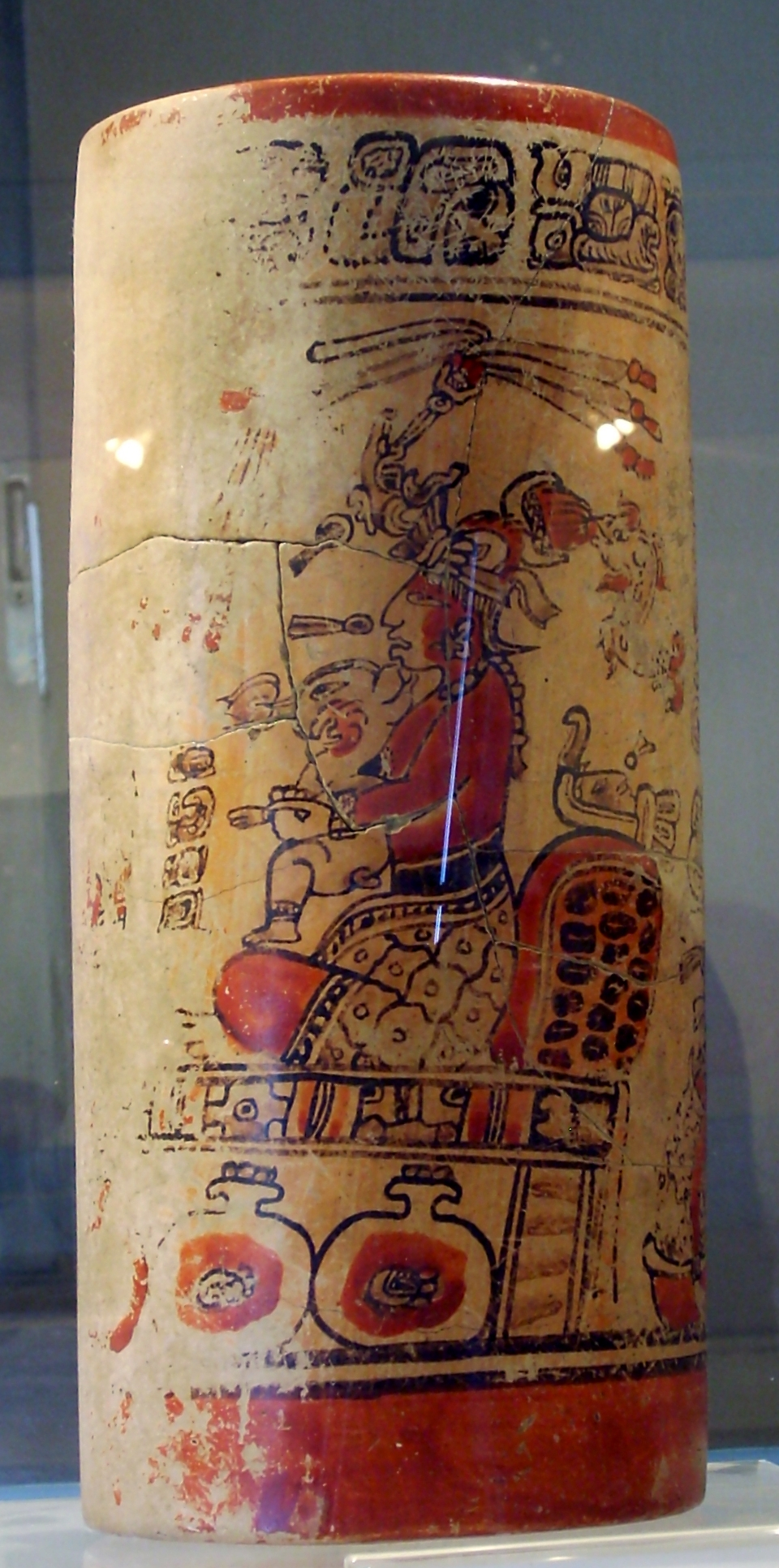

This ceramic vase (catalogue number PSPA-708) was excavated from the ruins of Sacul. The piece is of the Palmar variety of the Palmar-Naranja Polychrome type, belonging to the Palmar-Danta ceramic group. It has been dated to the Late Classic Period. It was a funerary offering accompanying Burial 193 at Sacul, it was interred in front of Structure 1 of Group 26 of that city.

The vase was a drinking vessel for chocolate and depicts a mythological scene featuring what looks like the moon goddess, but is more likely the tonsured maize god, who, functioning as a lunar deity, carries a rabbit in his arms. The god is seated upon a throne, which is decorated with a celestial band. Below him are three jars of pulque. Only about half of the original scene has survived, and the text next to the maize god is illegible. Only slight traces remain of a second person seated upon the same throne, to the left of the maize god. Two rows of supernatural beings are seated on the floor before the throne, indicating that they are visiting the enthroned principal figures. Three of these visitors can be identified, including two versions of God N, represented as separate individuals, and a being that is a man-bird hybrid. These figures are also accompanied by hieroglyphs, although they are also illegible. The vase includes a dedicatory hieroglyphic text around the rim that identifies it as the drinking vessel of a lord of the city of Naranjo.
