= Aj Yaxjal Bʼaak =

- Ajaw

King of Ixtutz
- Reign: c.780
- Born: Ixtutz
- Died: Ixtutz
- Religion: Maya religion

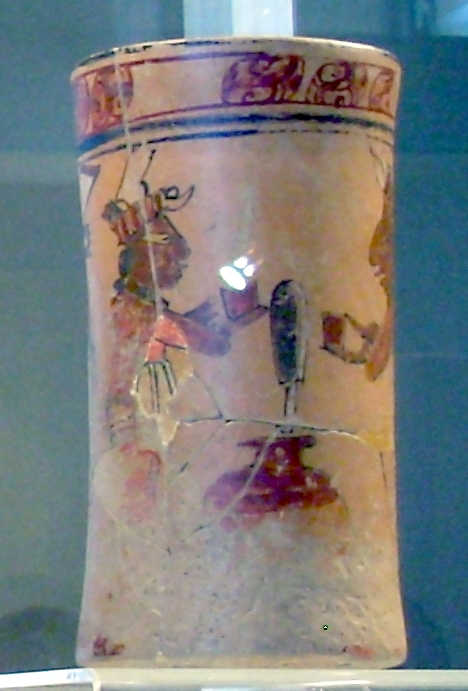
Late Classic ceramic vessel from the Maya ruins of Ixtutz, from where Aj Yaxjal Bʼaak ruled. Now in the Museo Regional del Sureste de Petén in Dolores.

Aj Yaxjal Bʼaak (ruled c. 780) was the only known ruler of the Maya city of Ixtutz, which was the most important city in the Dolores region.

A stela dated to AD 780 records a ceremony performed by Aj Yaxjal Bʼaak and attended by his overlord from the Petexbatún, most likely to have been Tan Teʼ Kʼinich of Aguateca, and 28 other lords from both within the Dolores valley and further afield.
