= Ixtutz =

Archaeological Maya site in Guatemala

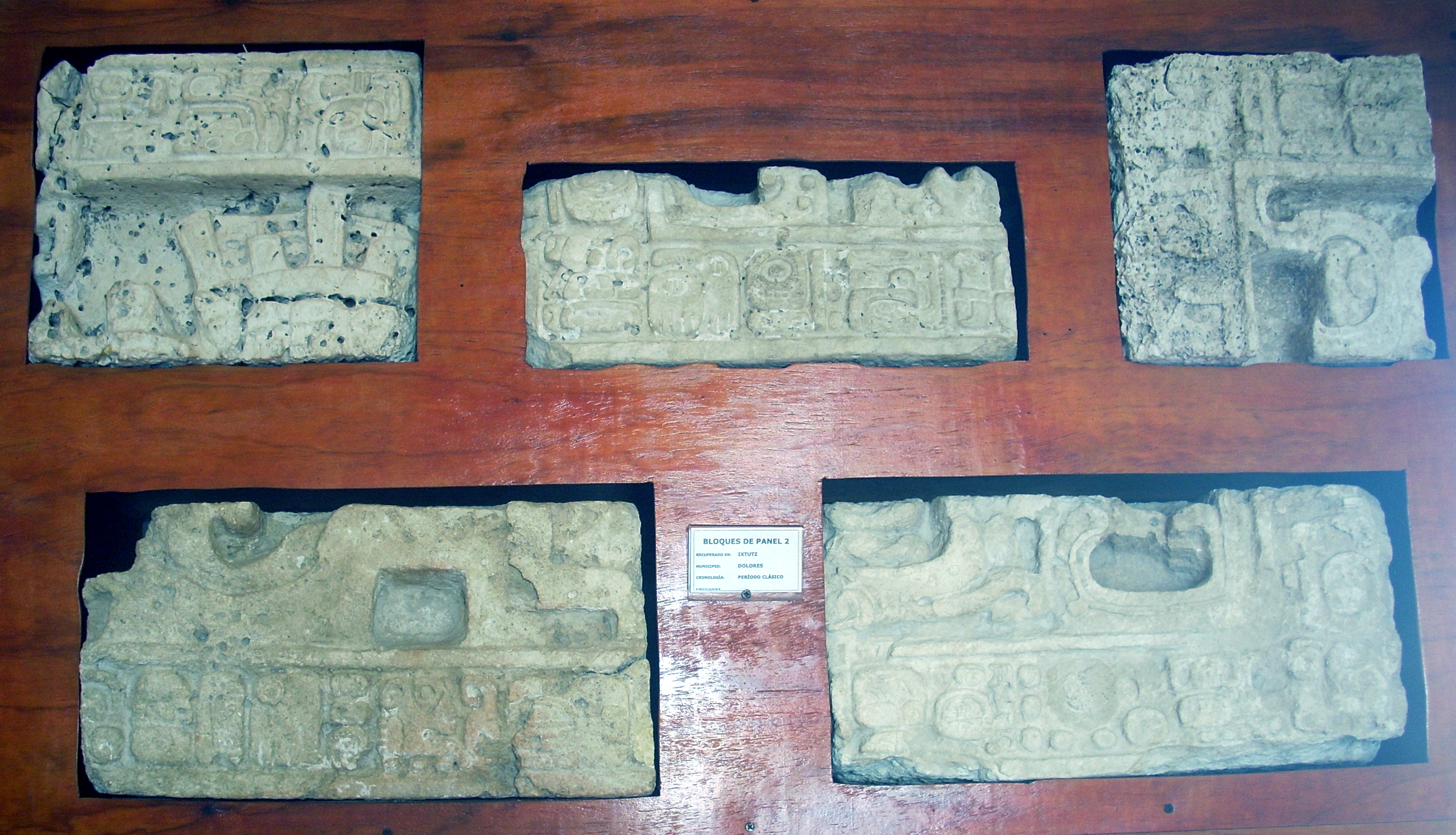
- Fragments of Panel 2
- Interactive map of Ixtutz
- Periods: Classic Period
- Cultures: Maya civilization
- Location: Dolores
- Region: Petén Department, Guatemala

History
- Built: Late Preclassic Period
- Abandoned: Terminal Classic Period

Site notes
- Architectural style: Classic Maya
- Archaeologists: Juan Pedro Laporte, Merle Greene Robertson IDAEH

Ixtutz ([iʃˈtuːts]) was an important Classic Period Maya city located south of Ixkun in southeastern Petén, Guatemala. Ixtutz is situated in the valley of the Poxte River in the western portion of the Maya Mountains. The site was inhabited during the Preclassic Period to the end of the Terminal Classic Period of Mesoamerican chronology and dominated the western portion of the Dolores valley.

In the Late Classic Ixtutz was one of the most important centres in the Dolores region, competing fiercely with other sites in the area, and maintained strong political relations with the cities of the southwestern Petén such as Dos Pilas and Machaquila.

== Location ==
Ixtutz is located in the municipality of Dolores, 8 kilometres (5.0 mi) southwest of that town, in the Petén Department of northern Guatemala. The site is situated at an altitude of 400 metres (1,300 ft) above mean sea level in the valley of the Poxte River, surrounded by hilly terrain. The river itself flows westwards of the site.

An area of 1 square kilometre (0.39 sq mi) is protected by the Guatemalan Institute of Anthropology and History. This area is covered by primary rainforest, although the surrounding countryside has been cleared for agriculture.

Other Maya archaeological sites in the Ixtutz area include Ixtonton at 8.7 kilometres (5.4 mi), Ixkun at 12 kilometres (7.5 mi), Ixcol at 8.2 kilometres (5.1 mi), Moquena at 8.8 kilometres (5.5 mi), El Tzic at 9.4 kilometres (5.8 mi), Sukche at 5.7 kilometres (3.5 mi), Ixcoxol at 4.7 kilometres (2.9 mi), Nocsos at 5.8 kilometres (3.6 mi), Curucuitz at 2.9 kilometres (1.8 mi), Mopan 2 at 10 kilometres (6.2 mi), Tesik at 2.9 kilometres (1.8 mi), Ixec at 4 kilometres (2.5 mi) and Ixac at 7 kilometres (4.3 mi).

== History ==
Known rulers of Ixtutz
Name	Ruled
Aj Yaxjal B’aak	c.780

Ixtutz was first occupied in the Late Preclassic and occupation continued through the Classic Period. The city appears to have already been important before it started erecting sculpted monuments in the Late Classic.

During the Late Classic Ixtutz was one of the five most important Maya cities in the northwestern portion of the Maya Mountains, along with Sacul, Ixtonton, Ixkun and Curucuitz. Around 760 AD the political organization of the region appears to have changed and the rulers of Ixtutz and neighbouring Sacul began to erect sculpted monuments with hieroglyphic texts and to use their own Emblem Glyphs.

In the late 8th century AD Ixtutz was subordinate to one of the Petexbatún cities to the west. A text on Stela 4 mentions that Ixtutz's overlord came from the city of Mutuul and this was likely to have been either the kingdom of Seibal-La Amelia or Aguateca, although at this time four different kingdoms in the region were claiming the Mutuul title of the fallen Dos Pilas kingdom.

A stela dated to AD 780 records a ceremony performed by king Aj Yaxjal B’aak and attended by his overlord from the Petexbatún, most likely to have been Tan Te' K'inich of Aguateca, and 28 other lords from both within the Dolores valley and further afield. Ixtutz experienced a decrease in activity during the Terminal Classic period, after AD 825 all sites in the region ceased to erect further monuments although occupation continued. Ixtutz and other centres in the Dolores region were finally abandoned at the end of the Terminal Classic.

=== Modern history ===
The site was first discovered in 1852 by Colonel Modesto Mendez (then Governor of Petén) and Eusebio Lara before being lost for more than a century. American archaeologist Merle Greene Robertson visited the site in 1970–1971. She recorded its monuments and published a site map. Eric Von Euw and Ian Graham visited Ixtutz in 1972, and published a new map and illustrations of stelae 1–4 together with the fragments of Panel 1. In 1985 archaeologists of the Tikal Project visited the site, carried out limited test excavations, and moved some monument pieces to Dolores. The Atlas Arqueológico de Guatemala has carried out limited excavations at the site since 1987, including the excavation of four structures located on the Main Plaza.

The ruins have suffered only limited damage from looters.

== Site description ==
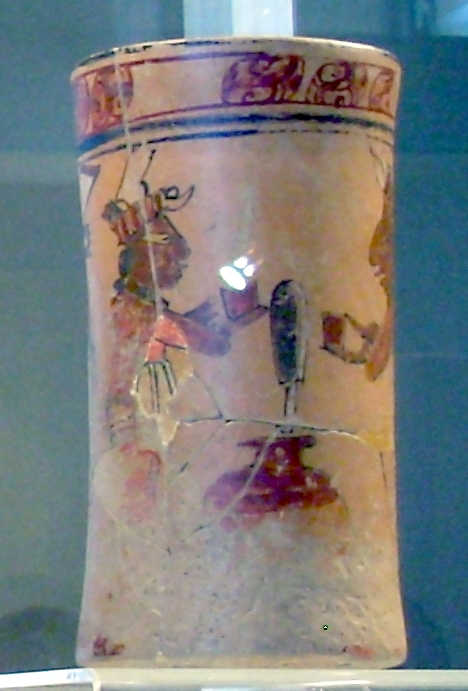
Late Classic ceramic vessel from Ixtutz

Ixtutz includes several plazas and temple pyramids, a ballcourt and two acropolis complexes with vaulted palaces. Monuments at the site include 12 stelae and 4 Altars.

The site contains 9 architectural groups in the site; in the periphery there are 30 groups with 122 mapped structures. The groups in the site core include a ceremonial group and three groups that could be elite residencial complexes. The site lacks a Mesoamerican ballcourt. A large enclosure within the ceremonial group may have been dedicated to the cultivation of a high-value crop such as cacao although this has not been confirmed. Although the site was occupied during the Preclassic period, the majority of the architecture is believed to date to the Late Classic. The ceremonial city of the centre, in spite of the simplicity of its layout, possesses traits that distinguish it as an important regional site. Among these traits the most unusual is the presence of an E-Group complex, the only such complex in the entire Dolores region. Ixtutz has stylistic similarities with Machaquila in southwest Petén.

A hieroglyphic text on a stela at the site mentions the Late Classic city of Dos Pilas in the Petexbatún region. At least one monument from the site depicts a war captive.

=== Group A ===
Plaza A is the largest plaza in Ixtutz, with a total area of 2,925 square metres (31,480 sq ft). The plaza includes 11 structures, including the only E-group complex in the region. The structures around the plaza have been dated to the Late Classic.

Structure 1 is on the north side of Plaza A. The structure has two levels and a south-facing stairway where the treads are much wider than the height of the risers. The summit of the upper level of the structure was flat, possessing no superstructure.

Structure 2 is the West Pyramid of the E-Group. It is very poorly preserved with various part of the building having collapsed and with no surviving trace of any access stairway. It supported a bench on the summit. The remains of Stela 5 were found in front of this building.

Structure 3 is at the southern extreme of the west side of Plaza A and is in a poor state of preservation. It was built from large blocks that measured up to 0.8 metres (2.6 ft) high by 0.6 metres (2.0 ft) thick. The steps start wider than their height, with the treads 0.92 metres (3.0 ft) wide until the sixth step, after which they decrease to a width 0.6 metres (2.0 ft). A raised bench is set into the upper platform.

Structures 4, 5 and 6 together form the South Platform, enclosing the south side of Plaza A. They were built with thin, flat stones without much mortar between. The platform's access stairway climbs the central section (Structure 5).

Structure 4 is a small structure set upon the lowest section of the platform on the west side. The platform is only 1.2 metres (3.9 ft) high on this side.

Structure 5 is 4 metres (13 ft) high and comprises the centre section of the south platform. The facade of the structure supports the platforms access stairway while the rear descends in two terraces. Two benches are upon the upper part of the structure.

Structure 6 is very similar to Structure 4 and forms the east section of the South Platform.

The East Platform of the E-Group supports Structures 9, 10 and 11. The platform is 65 metres (213 ft) long and 2 metres (6.6 ft) high.

Structure 9 is upon the southern part of the East Platform. It is 1.2 metres (3.9 ft) high.

Structure 10 is the central structure of the E-Group East Platform. The structure had no superstructure but supported a 1.5-metre (4.9 ft) high platform. The stub of Stela 7 was found in front of this platform.

Structure 11 stands upon the northern part of the East Platform. It is 1.2 metres (3.9 ft) high.

=== Group B ===
This group is located to the northeast of Group A. It is a secondary ceremonial centre dating to the Late Classic and possesses 5 structures laid out around a 650-square-metre (7,000 sq ft) patio.

Structure 12 is a basal platform on the west side of the patio. It supports two platforms.

Structure 15 is a platform with a wide access stairway located on the east side of the patio.

=== Group C ===
Group C is situated on a 45-metre (148 ft) high limestone hill to the west of Group A. The group consists of 7 low platforms laid out around a 670-square-metre (7,200 sq ft) plaza, leaving the patio open on the east side.

=== Group J ===
Group J is located northeast of Group A, to the north of Group B. There are 3 structures arranged around a 450-square-metre (4,800 sq ft) patio. The largest structure is on the north side while the south side was left open. Investigations revealed three layers of occupation, with the final layer dating to the Late Classic and the earlier levels to the Preclassic.

=== Monuments ===
The plaza in Group A contained a number of sculpted monuments that were likely to have been erected by king Aj Yaxjal B’aak in the 8th century AD.

Panel 1 was originally set into Structure 1 on the north side of Plaza A.

Panel 2 is fragmented, the pieces have been moved to Dolores and are now in the Museo Regional del Sureste de Petén (Southeastern Petén Regional Museum). It was originally set into Structure 1 with Panel 1.

Stelae 1 through to 4 were all erected at the east end of the main plaza and were served by a single altar. All five monuments were likely to have been erected by Aj Yaxjal B’aak.

Stelae 1, 2 and 3 all remain in situ at Ixtutz, protected by palm-leaf canopies.

Stela 4 was originally located at the base of the platform that supported Structures 9, 10 and 11 in Group A. The monument carved from limestone and is sculpted on one face only and contains a hieroglyphic text without any accompanying portrait. The text is largely well-preserved due to the monument having fallen face down in ancient times. This text records that the stela was dedicated on 28 November in AD 780.

Stela 5 was a limestone monument erected in front of Structure 2 (the West Pyramid). The stela was badly fragmented and may have been plain.

Stela 7 was placed on the summit of Structure 10, in front of its summit platform. Only the base of the stela remains in place.
