= Tzalá River =

Coordinates: 14.7435°N 91.1793°W

Location
- Country: Guatemala

The Tzalá River (Spanish pronunciation: [tsaˈla]) is a river in Guatemala. The Tzalá joins the Cuilco River through its tributary the Cabajchum River.

== See also ==
- List of rivers of Guatemala
