= Nimá I River =

River in Guatemala

Location
- Country: Guatemala

The Nimá I River is a river in Guatemala. It flows into the El Tambor River, which in turn is a tributary of the Samalá River.

== See also ==
- List of rivers of Guatemala
