= Blanco River (San Marcos) =

Location
- Country: Guatemala

The Blanco River is a river of Guatemala. It is located in the department of San Marcos. The Blanco joins the Cuilco River through its tributary the Las Manzanas River.

== See also ==
- List of rivers of Guatemala
