= Nima II River =

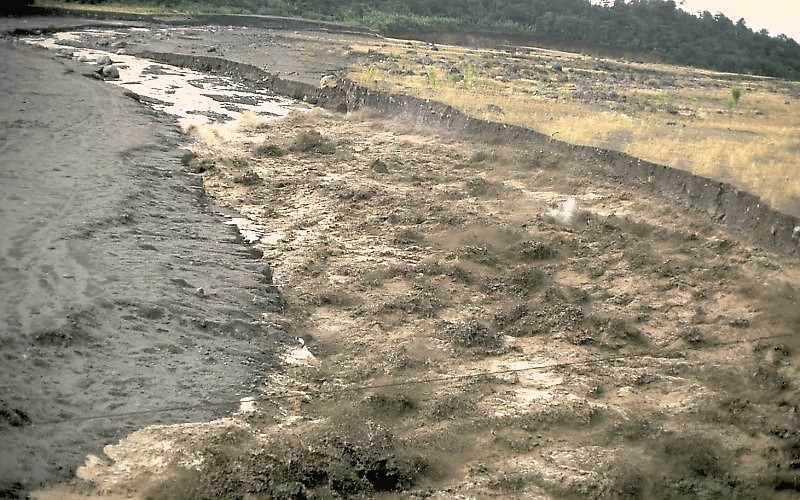
- Hot lahar rushing down the Nima II river, near El Palmar, Guatemala, 1989

Location
- Country: Guatemala

The Nima II River is a river of Guatemala. It joins the El Tambor River, which later becomes a tributary of the Samalá River.

== See also ==
- List of rivers of Guatemala
