= Ixtonton =

Archaeological Maya site in Guatemala

Coordinates: 16°30′15.73″N 89°23′24.89″W

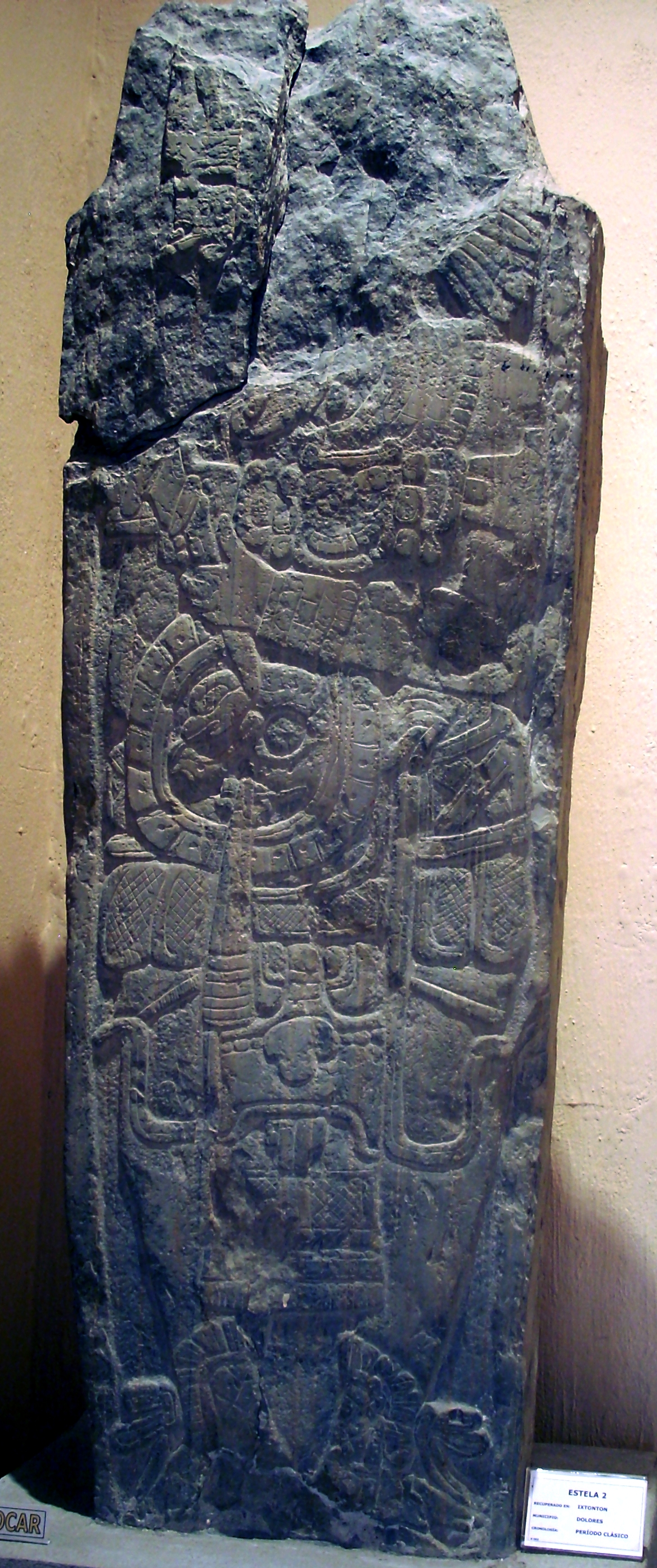
Stela 2 from Ixtonton, now in the Museo Regional del Sureste de Petén ("Southeastern Peten Regional Museum")

Ixtonton is a Maya archaeological site in the department of Petén in northern Guatemala. It is located in the northwestern portion of the Maya Mountains in the municipality of Dolores. The ruins are situated approximately 2 kilometres (1.2 mi) east of the town of Dolores itself. Ixtonton was the capital city of one of the four Maya kingdoms in the upper Mopan Valley. The site was occupied from the Late Preclassic period (c. 400 BC – AD 200) through to the Terminal Classic (c. AD 800-900), with some evidence of continued activity into the Postclassic (c. 900–1521). For the majority of its history Ixtonton was the most important city in the upper Mopan Valley, with its only rivals emerging in the Late Classic (c. 600-900). The acropolis at Ixtonton is laid out around two plazas on top of an artificially modified karstic hill.

Ixtonton was first described by the Atlas Arqueológico de Guatemala project in 1985. The ruins have been set aside as a protected archaeological park by the Dirección General del Patrimonio Cultural y Natural ("Department of Cultural and Natural Heritage").

== Location ==
The site is bordered to the north and the east by the Mopan River, while to the south the terrain is characterised by savanna and pine forest (of the species Pinus caribaea). To the west are karstic limestone hills very similar in nature to those that the site itself occupies. Ixtonton is located close to a number of other Maya archaeological sites, the most important of which are Ixtutz, 8.7 kilometres (5.4 mi) distant, and Ixkun at a distance of 7.5 kilometres (4.7 mi).

== History ==
Ceramic finds suggest that the site was first occupied at the beginning of the Late Preclassic period, possibly with the E-Group astronomical complex in the site core being built at around that time. From that time onwards Ixtonton was the most important city in the Dolores Valley and a large portion of the Maya Mountains, and it had no serious challenger throughout the Early Classic period. The site was heavily occupied in the Late Classic and large quantities of finds have been recovered that date to the Terminal Classic, with evidence that occupation continued into the Postclassic. During the Late Classic, Ixkun and Ixtutz both developed sufficiently to rival Ixtonton, but this did not last and Ixtonton continued as the most prominent site in the region.

Ixtonton was first reported to the Guatemalan authorities in 1985, by which time most of its stelae had already been looted.

== Site description ==
The site covers an approximate area of 6 square kilometres (2.3 sq mi), with its borders not clearly demarked but rather a gradual phasing into neighbouring centres. The site includes all the features commonly associated with a principal city in the Maya lowlands, including plazas, temples, ballcourts, palaces and causeways.

=== Site core ===
The principal architecture is grouped around two plazas upon a massive basal platform, itself set upon a karstic hill. The East Plaza was dominated by an E-Group astronomical complex, while the principal structure of the West Plaza was a pyramid on its south side. There are three smaller plazas; the North Plaza, Northwest Plaza, Southeast Plaza. Ixtonton is one of only two cities in the central Dolores plateau that possess two ballcourts instead of only one, the other city being Ix Ak. Both ballcourts are located within the site core. They are small in size and are both oriented north-south. The various groups in the site core are linked by three causeways, denominated the North Causeway, the South Causeway and the West Causeway.

Ballcourt I is located to the northwest of the E-Group complex near to the North Causeway and dates to the Late Classic. It measures 11 by 11 metres (36 by 36 ft). The eastern structure of the ballcourt has been heavily damaged by looters, with four major looters' pits. The western structure is in somewhat better condition, with two major looters' pits, but is also badly damaged and heavily eroded.

Ballcourt II also dates to the Late Classic but was built later than Ballcourt I. It measures 20 by 5 metres (66 by 16 ft). The East and West Structures were built of well-cut stone, with the sides of the playing area rising vertically for two courses of stone, then continuing as a slope.

The E-Group consists of an East Platform supporting a central temple and flanked by two smaller shrines. The complex has been damaged by looters, with the greater damage being caused to the flanking shrines. Ceramic fragments recovered from the north shrine date to the Late Classic. The central temple was accessed via a 7.4-metre (24 ft) long recessed stairway. The stairway was built from stone blocks measuring 50 by 30 centimetres (20 by 12 in) by 10 centimetres (3.9 in) high. The steps have a tread of 40 centimetres (16 in) and risers measuring 37 centimetres (15 in). Two stelae were situated at the base of the central stairway, they are both very poorly preserved. Stela 2 was situated on the north side of the stairway. The badly fragmented remains of a plain stela were found in a symmetrical position on the south side of the base of the central stairway.

==== West Plaza ====
The Northwest Structure of the West Plaza is a small platform measuring 5 metres (16 ft) north-south by 6 metres (20 ft) east-west.

=== Causeways ===
The North Causeway is the longest causeway at Ixtonton. It measures 550 metres (1,800 ft) long and averages 15 metres (49 ft) wide. It was built from broken stone, maintaining it level in spite of the hilly terrain, with the more elevated portions of causeway being contained by reinforced walls. It ends in a low platform at the north end and joins the site core to the various architectural groups located to the north.

The South Causeway is 150 metres (490 ft) long and 20 metres (66 ft) wide. It leads to a group of structures situated upon a raised basal platform, near a group of hills supporting further architectural groups.

The West Causeway is 470 metres (1,540 ft) long and 20 metres (66 ft) wide, running west from a junction with the South Causeway. Its construction is very similar to that of the North Causeway. It joins the ceremonial core of the site to Group 2.

=== Other groups ===
The site included 120 residential groups separated by uninhabited areas that may have been used for agriculture. The site periphery includes 79 archaeological groups located on 64 hills. The hills vary in height from minor elevations of 2 metres (6.6 ft) through to hills that stand over 20 metres (66 ft) high. The site has been heavily looted, with 75% of the archaeological groups exhibiting damage, with the damage being concentrated on the larger mounds.

==== Group 2 ====
Group 2 is located to the northwest of the ceremonial core of the site, upon a hill that may have been artificially modified. It supports a number of mounds enclosing a raised plaza, in some cases parts of the walls are visible. Narrow pieces of fallen stone lintel are visible on the north structure. Group 2 is the most important architectural group outside of the ceremonial core of the city. It was accessed from the West Causeway via a stairway and included the tallest architecture among the peripheral groups of the site, with one structure standing over 8.5 metres (28 ft) tall.

==== Group 28 ====
Group 28 is situated upon a limestone hill in the southwestern portion of the site. It was excavated in 1995 by the Escuela de Historia ("School of History") of the Universidad de San Carlos de Guatemala. It consists of 29 residential structures, most of which are situated upon the summit, although a cluster of structures were built upon a terrace upon the northwest side of the hill. Group 28 has suffered extensive damage as a result of the activities of looters, with further damage caused by modern agricultural activity. The excavated structures were all built in a single construction period during the Late Classic, and continued in use through to the Terminal Classic. The group probably continued to be inhabited into the Postclassic period. Excavations of the patio of Group 28 revealed rubble infill dating to the Late Preclassic, although no structures were found to date to this far back. The excavators believed that older structures were demolished to make way for later construction. Relatively abundant finds associated with Group 28 included ceramics, stone artefacts, worked bone and antler tools.

Structure 1 in this group is distinguished from the other structures by its size, and served a political-administrative function. It measures 7.8 by 11.3 metres (26 by 37 ft).

=== Monuments ===
Ixtonton had various stelae, but the majority of them were looted before the site had been reported, leaving only 2 in place. There are also a number of plain altars, some circular in shape and others with a flattened form.

Stela 1 is badly damaged. It was located in the centre of the West Plaza. It was fashioned from limestone and sculpted on one side only, with four columns of poorly preserved hieroglyphic script.

Stela 2 was found at the north side of the base of central stairway of the E-Group. It was found in a fallen position and was fashioned from slate and measured 1.5 metres (4.9 ft) long, 20 centimetres (7.9 in) thick and 40 to 50 centimetres (16 to 20 in) wide. When erect, the sculpted personage would have faced to the south, with the chest facing forwards. The figure grips a mannequin sceptre in the right hand. The sculpture is badly damaged, with the faced destroyed. Various fragments were found nearby but the stela butt is missing so the stela's original location is not known for certain. It is estimated to weigh 455 to 540 kilograms (1,003 to 1,190 lb).

=== Burials ===
Burial 138 through to Burial 145 were all found in Group 28. Most of these were too disturbed to provide much information, although the majority were adults.

Burial 142 was excavated from the main axis of Structure 13 in Group 28. The remains were those of an adult male deposited upon his back in a cist measuring 1.8 by 0.42 metres (5.9 by 1.4 ft). It was accompanied by an offering consisting of a ceramic bowl and a polychrome vase. The burial has been dated to the Late Classic period.

Burial 145 was found upon the axis of Structure 11 in Group 28. The remains were deposited lying curled on their left side in a cist measuring 0.95 by 0.55 metres (3.1 by 1.8 ft). The remains were oriented north-south with the head towards the north. A ceramic bowl was deposited by the head, there was also a flint arrowhead deposited as part of the offering. The burial has been dated to the Late Classic.
