= Tres Islas =

Archaeological site in Guatemala

Coordinates: 16°12′N 90°03′W

Tres Islas (Spanish for "Three Islands") is a small pre-Columbian Maya archaeological site 20 kilometres (12 mi) north of Cancuen in Petén Department, northern Guatemala. The site has been dated to the Late Preclassic (c.400 BC - 250 AD) and Late Classic (c.600-900 AD) periods of Mesoamerican chronology. The main feature of the site is a group of three Maya stelae and an altar, arranged in a way that mimics an E-Group Maya astronomical complex.

Tres Islas is one of only a few Maya cities that erected dated monuments in the Early Classic period (c. AD 250 - 600).

== Location ==
Tres Islas is situated on the west bank of the Pasión River in the municipality of Sayaxché in Guatemala's northern department of Petén. It is approximately 20 kilometres (12 mi) west of the ruins of Machaquila and about the same distance north of Cancuén. It is about 20 kilometres (12 mi) south of Seibal.

== History ==
The early presence of the Emblem glyph that was later associated with the Late Classic Cancuen-Machaquila kingdom indicates that Tres Islas was the Early Classic capital of the kingdom, with its functions as a capital city later being transferred to Cancuen. This period, represented by the sculpted monuments, was a time when the great metropolis of Teotihuacan in the Valley of Mexico was exerting a strong influence across the Maya region.

== Discovery ==
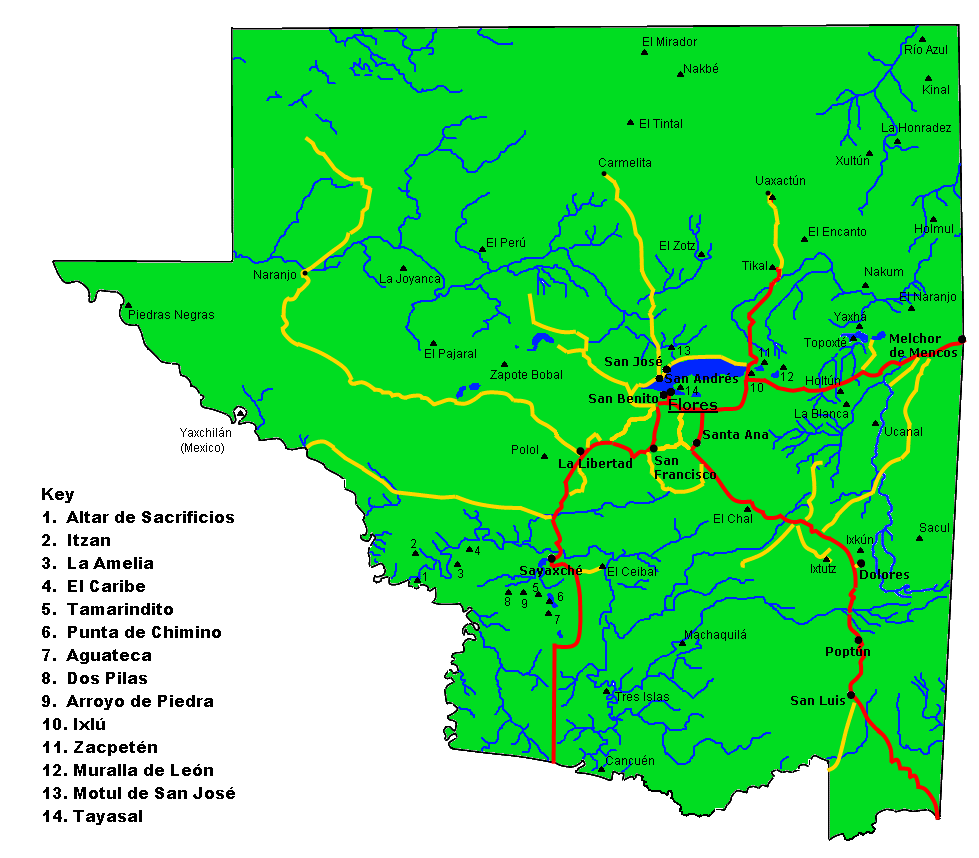
Map of Petén, showing the location of Tres Islas with relation to other archaeological sites in the department. Click to enlarge.

Although both Teobert Maler and Sylvanus Morley visited the nearby sites of Cancuen and La Reforma III in the early years of the 20th century, neither of them explored Tres Islas, a few kilometers upriver from La Reforma III. Maler's 1905 map mentions Tres Islas, but places it on the wrong side of the river. Ian Graham visited Tres Islas in 1965, 1966 and 1970 and reported three fallen Maya stelae. In 2003, the Cancuen Project initiated archaeological exploration of the site. Preliminary investigations in the area of Tres Islas and Cancuen revealed evidence of inhabitation from the Late Preclassic period (c.400 BC - 250 AD) through to the Late Classic (c.600-900 AD).

== Site ==
The site consists of a group of 3 stelae and an altar 200 metres (660 ft) north of three small structures, each 1.5 metres (4.9 ft) high. These two groups are located on the edge of a scarp overlooking the Pasión River.

The low platform supporting the three stelae measures 8.5 by 5 metres (28 by 16 ft) (north-south by east-west).

=== Monuments ===
The three stelae were aligned in a north-south row, facing to the west. The stelae originally stood on a long, low platform bordered with worked stone. An altar was placed directly west of the central stela. The arrangement of the stelae and altar precisely mimics the orientation and relationships of the E-Group astronomical complex at Uaxactun, suggesting that the monument group served a similar purpose. The siting of the stela-altar complex on the edge of an east-facing scarp offers a perfect location for observing the sunrise. Ceramic finds from the southern portion of the stela platform have been dated to the Late Preclassic and the Late Classic periods.

The combined hieroglyphic texts of the three stelae contain 137 glyphs and 12 Maya calendrical dates. All three stelae were dedicated in AD 475, although they refer to events in AD 400 and 416.

Stela 1 is badly damaged. Fragments of the monument were excavated in 2003 and were moved to the town of Santa Elena.

Stela 2 is the central stela of the three. It was associated with an offering consisting of two ceramic vessels placed rim to rim; these contained 9 jade figurines including representations of shells, a tortoise and a human head in profile, as well as pieces of coral and shells that included a cowry. Also found were nine obsidian cores and over 300 pieces of worked flint.

Stela 3 is the smallest of the three stelae. It is broken diagonally in two fragments. The stela depicts a personage dressed in the war-garb of Teotihuacan and bearing three feathered darts in his left hand. The figure wears an elaborate feathered headdress with cheek guards, and a fan-shaped tail piece formed of feathers and the tails of three coyotes. The image of the warrior is very similar to the portrait of Tikal king Yax Nuun Ayiin I as depicted on Stela 31 of that city. Above the figure there is the image of a flying bird of a type commonly found on the monuments of the Pacific Coast, and the figure stands upon an image of a scarlet macaw, believed to be an identifying symbol of Tres Islas. The text of the stela is badly eroded, consisting of an introductory glyph and two columns of eight glyphs. The date recorded on the stela appears to equate to a date in AD 400.
