= Nil River (Guatemala) =

Location
- Country: Guatemala

The Nil River is a river of Guatemala. It is a tributary of the Ocosito River.

== See also ==
- List of rivers of Guatemala
