= Pantaleón River =

- Native name: Río Pantaleón (Spanish)

Location
- Country: Guatemala

Physical characteristics
- Source
  - location: Guatemala (Chimaltenango, Escuintla)
  - coordinates: 14.454379°N 90.972633°W
  - elevation: 2,400 m (7,900 ft)
- Mouth
  - location: Tributary of the San Crostobal River
  - coordinates: 14.204399°N 91.134338°W
  - elevation: 80 m (260 ft)

The Río Pantaleón is a river in the south of Guatemala. Its sources are located in the Sierra Madre mountain range, on the western slopes of the Volcán de Fuego in the departments of Chimaltenango and Escuintla. The river flows in a south-westerly direction through the coastal lowlands of Escuintla where it joins the San Cristobal River, a tributary of the Coyolate River.

The Pantaleón's proximity to the active Fuego volcano increases the risks of inundations and mudflows.
