= Chisna River =

River in Guatemala

Location
- Country: Guatemala

The Chisna River is a river of Guatemala in the San Marcos Department. It is a tributary of the Río Naranjo.

== See also ==
- List of rivers of Guatemala
