= Siguacán River =

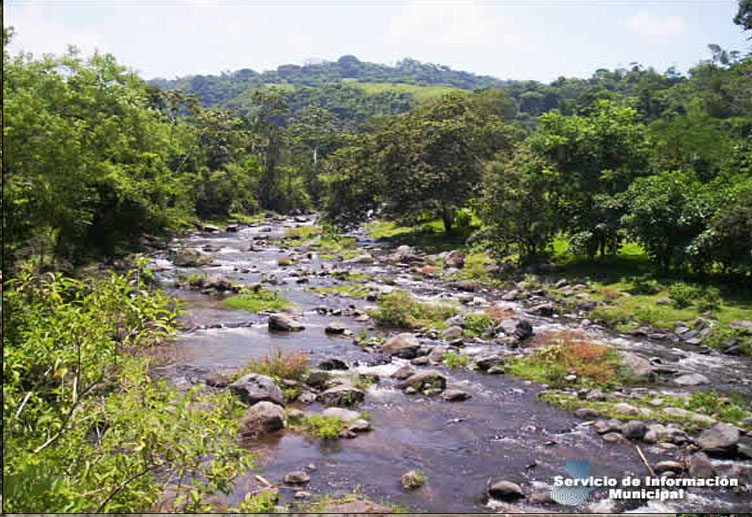
- Photo showing the river

Location
- Country: Guatemala

The Siguacán River (Spanish pronunciation: [siɣwaˈkan]) is a river of Guatemala. It is a tributary of the Río Nahualate.

== See also ==
- List of rivers of Guatemala
