= Xaya River =

Coordinates: 14.453°N 91.101°W

Xayá River

Location
- Country: Guatemala

The Xayá River (Spanish pronunciation: [ʃaˈʝa]) is a river of Guatemala. It is a tributary of the Coyolate River.

== See also ==
- List of rivers of Guatemala
