= Ixtacapa River =

Location
- Country: Guatemala

The Ixtacapa River is a river of Guatemala. It is a tributary of the Río Nahualate.

== See also ==
- List of rivers of Guatemala
