= Jupilingo River =

Location
- Country: Guatemala

The Jupilingo River is a river of Guatemala. The Jupilingo is a tributary of the Río Grande de Zacapa.

== See also ==
- List of rivers of Guatemala
