= Oc River =

Coordinates: 14.3411°N 91.6821°W

Location
- Country: Guatemala

The Oc River is a river of Guatemala and a tributary of the Samalá River.

== See also ==
- List of rivers of Guatemala
