= San Román River =

Location
- Country: Guatemala

The San Román River is a river of Guatemala. It is a tributary of the Salinas River.

== See also ==
- List of rivers of Guatemala
