= Sís River =

- Native name: Río Sís (Spanish)

Location
- Country: Guatemala

Physical characteristics
- Source
  - location: Guatemala (Suchitepéquez, Retalhuleu
  - coordinates: 14.663063°N 91.533837°W
  - elevation: 1,200 m (3,900 ft)
- Mouth
  - location: Tributary of the Icán River
  - elevation: 0 m (0 ft)

The Río Sis is a river in southwest Guatemala. Its sources are in the Sierra Madre range, on the slopes of the Santo Tomás and Zunil volcanoes in the department of Suchitepéquez. It flows southwards through the municipalities of San Francisco Zapotitlán, Cuyotenango, San Lorenzo and Mazatenango and joins the Icán River, which flows into the Pacific Ocean.

The Sís–Icán river basin covers an area of 919 km² (355 sq ml).
