= Petacalapa River =

River in Guatemala

Location
- Country: Guatemala

The Petacalapa River is a river of Guatemala. It is a tributary of the Suchiate River.

== See also ==
- List of rivers of Guatemala
