= San Cristobal River (Guatemala) =

Location
- Country: Guatemala

The San Cristobal River or Cristobal River is a river in Escuintla Department, Guatemala. The Cristobal is a tributary of the Coyolate River.

== See also ==
- List of rivers of Guatemala
