= Icán River =

River in Guatemala

- Location of mouth
- Native name: Río Icán (Spanish)

Location
- Country: Guatemala

Physical characteristics
- Source
  - location: Guatemala (Suchitepéquez
  - coordinates: 14.663063°N 91.533837°W
  - elevation: 1,200 m (3,900 ft)
- Mouth
  - location: Pacific Ocean
  - coordinates: 14.125006°N 91.665201°W
  - elevation: 0 m (0 ft)
- Length: 53 km (33 mi)
- Discharge
  - average: 34 m^{3}/s (1,200 cu ft/s) (at Bracitos)

The Río ícán is a river in southwest Guatemala. Its sources are in the Sierra Madre range, on the slopes of the Santo Tomás volcano in the department of Suchitepéquez. It flows southwards through the coastal lowlands of Suchitepequez to the Pacific Ocean.

The river runs more or less parallel to its main tributary, the Sís River. The Sís–Icán river basin covers an area of 919 km² (355 sq ml).

== See also ==
- List of rivers of Guatemala
