= Machaquila River =

Location
- Country: Guatemala

Physical characteristics
- Mouth: Pasión River
  - coordinates: 16°12′46″N 90°02′05″W

The Machaquila River is a river of Guatemala.

In addition to the San Juan and Cancuén rivers, the Machaquila is one of the three main tributaries of the Pasión River.

== See also ==
- List of rivers of Guatemala
