= Machaquila =

Mayan ruined city in El Peten, Guatemala

Coordinates: 16.32°N 89.86°W

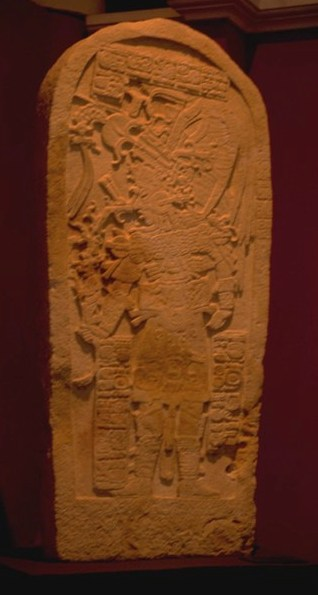
A stela from Machaquila, in the Museo Nacional de Arqueología y Etnología in Guatemala City

Machaquila (or Machaquilá, using Spanish orthography) is a major ruined city of the Maya civilization in what is now the El Peten department of Guatemala.

== Location ==
The ruins of Machaquila fall within the municipality of Poptún, in the Petén department of Guatemala. It is approximately 90 kilometres (56 mi) west of the town of Poptún, and 80 kilometres (50 mi) southeast of Sayaxché. Machaquila is situated on the banks of the lower Machaquila River, which is a major tributary of the Pasión River. The site is in a relatively isolated region. During the Classic period, the city's location would have placed it upon a trade route running from the Maya Mountains in the east to the Pasión River in the west, and ultimately to the Usumacinta River. Machaquila is 30 kilometres (19 mi) southeast of the contemporary Maya site of Seibal.

The site core containing the city's monumental architecture is protected, but under threat from occupation by landless peasants. The surrounding area, where the majority of the residential architecture is located, falls within privately owned farmland.

== Polity ==
Machaquila shared a pared Emblem Glyph with Cancuen, probably suggesting some form of joint rule and participation in a larger polity that included both cities. A proposal that Machaquila, Cancuen, and Tres Islas participated in a form of government that involved the transference of the status of capital from one city to the next has not been universally accepted.

== History ==
Machaquila flourished in the Late to Terminal Classic periods, reaching the height of its power in approximately the ninth century. The rise in activity at Machaquila appears to have been a side effect of the collapse of the power of Dos Pilas over the Petexbatún kingdom.

In 2004, archaeologists announced that they had uncovered a hieroglyphic panel at Cancuen that depicts Tajal Chan Ahk, the 8th-century king of that city. The high relief sculpture shows him installing subordinate rulers at Machaquila.

=== Modern history ===
The site was excavated in the early 21st century by the Atlas Arqueológico de Guatemala in collaboration with the Universidad Complutense de Madrid.

== Site description ==
The principal architecture at Machaquila has been dated to the Late Classic period, and includes temples and palace complexes. By 1984, nineteen stelae had been found at the site. Machaquila is unusual in the local region in lacking both an E-Group astronomical complex, and a ballcourt, which are both architectural arrangements that are often found in neighbouring cities. Machaquila is not particularly notable for its architecture or size, rather for its abundant sculpted monuments.

=== Plaza A ===
This architectural group is a ceremonial complex that includes various pyramids (Structures 16 to 20, and 22). Stelae and altars are associated with each of the pyramids. The investigating archaeologists also assume that this complex includes the tombs of city's rulers. The group was closed off from the rest of the city by Structure 45, which was probably residential in nature.

=== Plaza C ===
This complex is the largest group at Machaquila, and had a primarily residential function.

== Monuments ==
Although many sculpted monuments were noted when the site was discovered, none remain at Machaquila. A few were moved in order to protect them, but the majority were looted and their whereabouts is unknown. Sculpted monuments from Machaquila included 18 stelae and 6 altars, and a series of sculpted blocks. Those stelae that were rescued are now in the Museo Nacional de Arqueología in Guatemala City. The remaining monuments at the site include broken stela butts, and featureless stelae where the sculpted portions have been cut away by looters.
