= Las Manzanas River =

Location
- Country: Guatemala

The Las Manzanas River (Spanish pronunciation: [las manˈsanas]) is a river of Guatemala. It is a tributary of the Cuilco River which flows in Guatemala and Mexico.

== See also ==
- List of rivers of Guatemala
