= Cabajchum River =

Location
- Country: Guatemala

The Cabajchum River (Spanish pronunciation: [kaβaxˈtʃum]) is a river of Guatemala. It is a tributary of the Cuilco River which flows in Guatemala and Mexico.

== See also ==
- List of rivers of Guatemala
