= Cancuén River =

Location
- Country: Guatemala

Physical characteristics
- Discharge
  - average: e =

The Cancuén River is a river that flows through Guatemala. It is one of the principal tributaries of the Pasión River.

== See also ==
- List of rivers of Guatemala
