= Museo Nacional de Arqueología y Etnología =

Museum in Guatemala City, Guatemala

Coordinates: 14.59761°N 90.52956°W

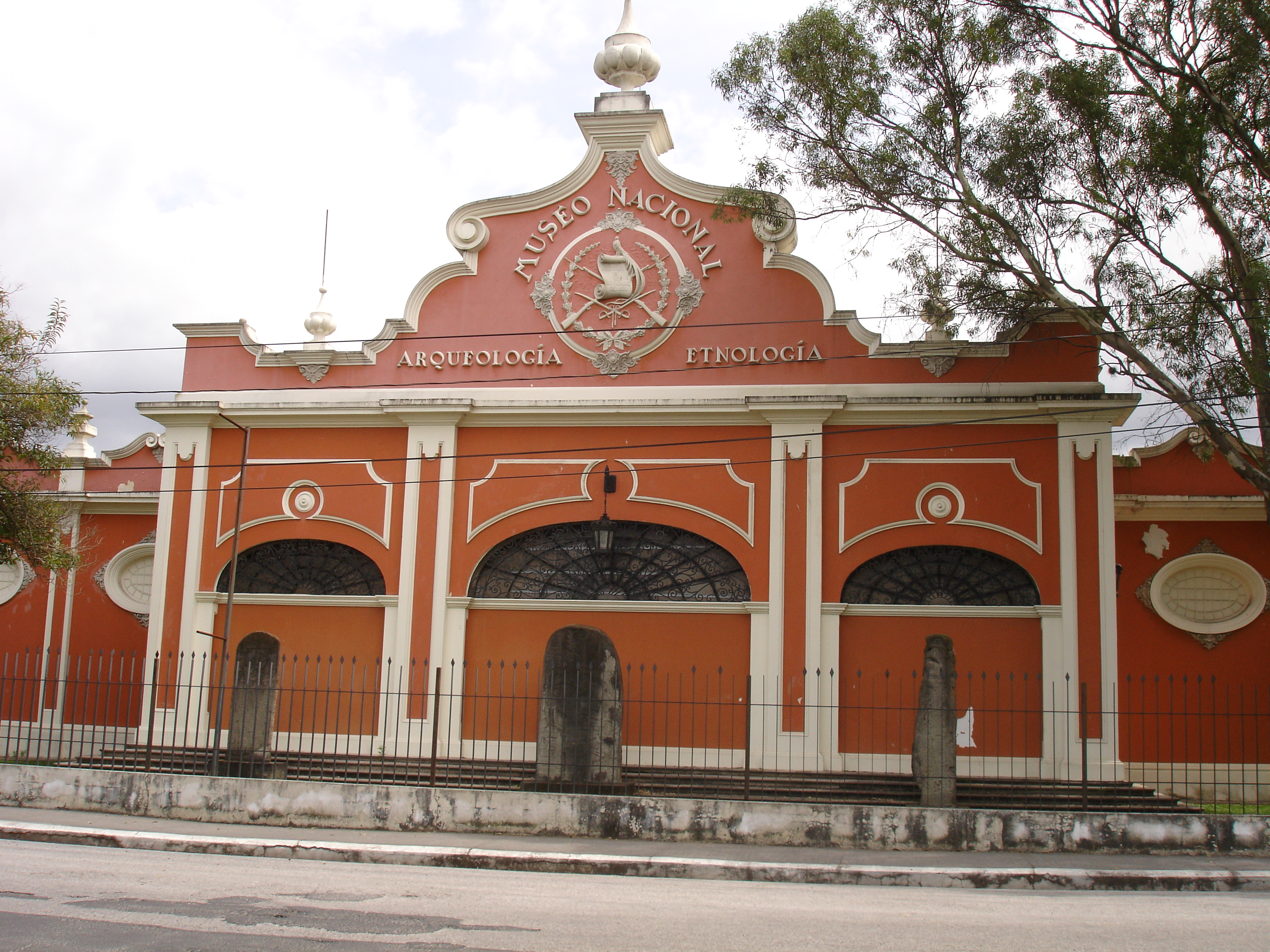
- Established: 30 June 1898
- Location: 6a. calle 7a. Avenida, Salón No.5; Finca La Aurora Zona 13; Guatemala City, Guatemala
- Type: national museum of pre-Columbian art and Mesoamerican archaeology and ethnology
- Website: www.munae.gob.gt

The Museo Nacional de Arqueología y Etnología (MUNAE; National Museum of Archaeology and Ethnology) is a national museum of Guatemala, dedicated to the conservation of archaeological and ethnological artifacts and research into Guatemala's history and cultural heritage. The museum is located in Guatemala City, at Finca La Aurora.

== History and collections ==
First created by a governmental decree on 30 June 1898, the institution and collections of MUNAE relocated premises several times subsequently, until they were established in its present building in 1946. The museum has some 3000 square meters of exhibition space, and 1500 sq.m. devoted to restorative and research purposes. MUNAE's collections amount to some 20 thousand archaeological artifacts and 5 thousand ethnological items.

== Donations ==
In October 2021, a fragment of stela 9 of Piedras Negras was returned to the museum by a private collector in France. Stolen from the site in the 1960s, it had reappeared in Paris on a 2019 auction.
