= San Francisco, Petén =

San Francisco
- Municipality
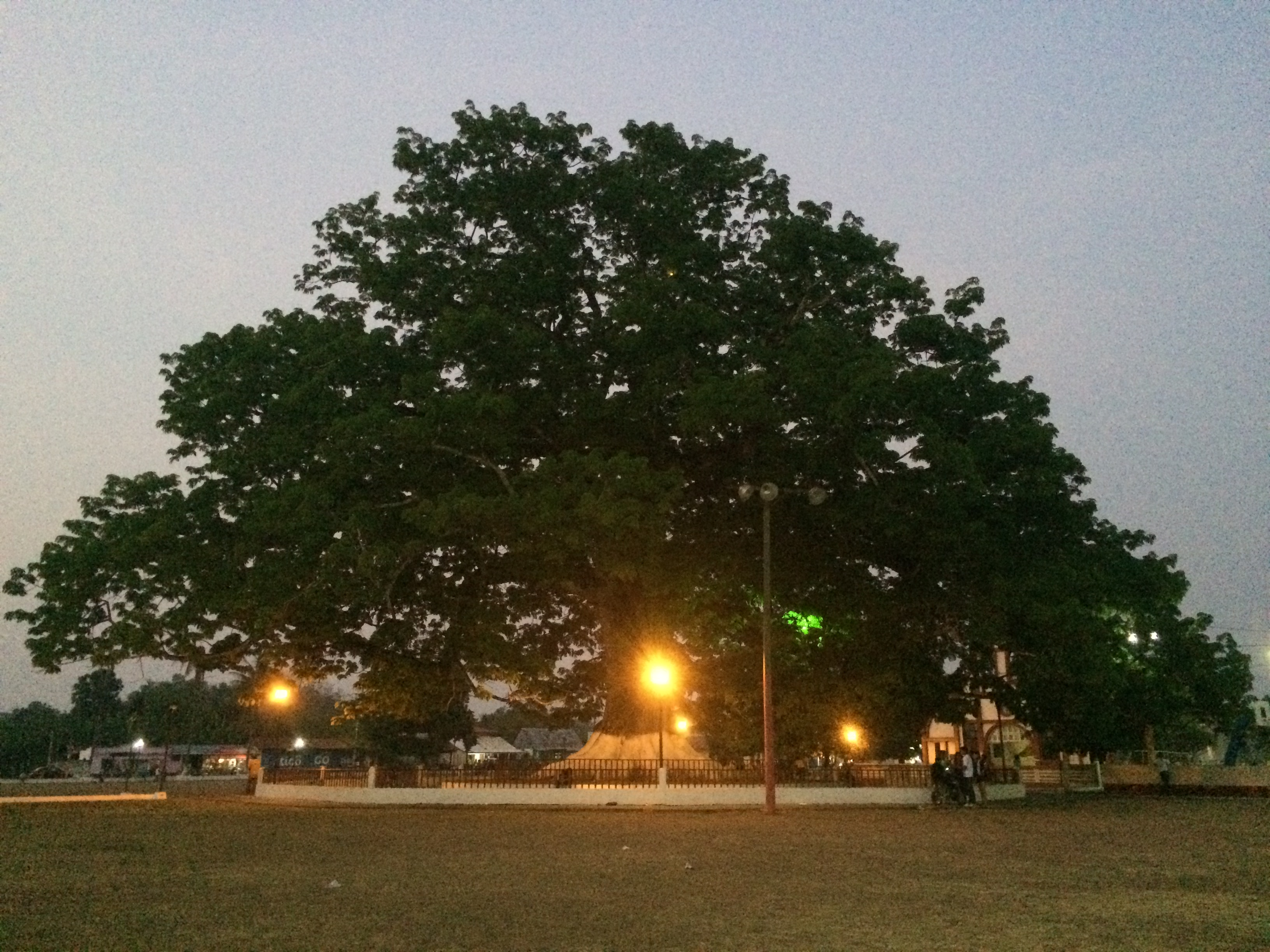

- Location within Guatemala
- Coordinates: 16°47′N 89°56′W
- Country: Guatemala
- Department: El Petén

Government
  - Mayor: José Luis Pérez Lara (PP)

Population (2000)
  - Total: 8,066
- Climate: Am
- Website: Website

San Francisco (Spanish pronunciation: [saɱ fɾanˈsisko]) is a municipality in the El Petén department of Guatemala. The municipality has a population of 8,066 people.

The San Francisco municipal government is led by mayor José Luis Pérez Lara (PP).

The municipality includes 11 communities:

- San Francisco (pop. 2713)
- San Juan de Dios (pop. 1118)
- Santa Cruz (pop. 246)
- Eben Ezer (pop. 229)
- San José Pinares (pop. 203)
- Nuevo San Francisco (pop. 144)
- San Valentín las Flores (pop. 1007)
- Santa Teresa (pop. 101)
- San Martín (pop. 347)
- Laguna El Zapotal (pop. 183)
- Nueva Guatemala (pop. 515)

== See also ==
- Feast of Saint Francis
