= San Lorenzo, Suchitepéquez =

Coordinates: 14.4833°N 91.5167°W

San Lorenzo (Spanish pronunciation: [san loˈɾenso]) is a municipality in the Suchitepéquez department of Guatemala. It is situated at 220 m above sea level. It contains 7,753 people. It covers a terrain of 60 km². The annual festival is on February 2.
