= Santa Ana, Guatemala =

Coordinates: 16.8069°N 89.8272°W

Santa Ana is a municipality in the El Petén department of Guatemala. It contains 7,792 people.
