= El Tambor River =

River in Guatemala

El Tambor River Rio Concepción
- Location of mouth

Location
- Country: Guatemala

Physical characteristics
- Mouth
  - coordinates: 14°36′58″N 91°36′53″W

The El Tambor River is a river of Guatemala. It is a tributary of the Samalá River.

== See also ==
- List of rivers of Guatemala
