= San Juan River (Guatemala) =

Location
- Country: Guatemala

The San Juan River is a river of Guatemala. It is one of the main tributaries of the Pasión River.

== See also ==
- List of rivers of Guatemala
