= Ocosito River =

River in Guatemala

- Location of mouth
- Native name: Río Ocosito (Spanish)

Location
- Country: Guatemala
- Departments: Quetzaltenango and Retalhuleu

Physical characteristics
- Source
  - location: Guatemala (Quetzaltenango)
  - coordinates: 14.812309°N 91.598339°W
  - elevation: 2,600 m (8,500 ft)
- Mouth
  - location: Pacific Ocean
  - coordinates: 14.43580°N 92.09369°W
- Length: 107 km (66 mi)
- Discharge
  - average: 30.2 m^{3}/s (1,070 cu ft/s) (at Caballo Blanco)

The río Ocosito (Spanish pronunciation: [okoˈsito]) is a river in Guatemala. The river's sources are located in the Sierra Madre mountain range in Quetzaltenango. It flows southwards to Retalhuleu and then west to the Pacific Ocean. The river is 107 kilometres (66 mi) long. The Ocosito river basin covers an area of 2,035 square kilometres (786 mi^{2}).
