= Río Naranjo (Guatemala) =

River in Guatemala

Location
- Country: Guatemala

Physical characteristics
- Source
  - location: Guatemala (San Marcos)
  - coordinates: 14.96933°N 91.76700°W
  - elevation: 2,300 m (7,500 ft)
- Mouth
  - location: Pacific Ocean
  - coordinates: 14.508563°N 92.185335°W
  - elevation: 0 m (0 ft)
- Length: 105 km (65 mi)
- Discharge
  - average: 20.7 m^{3}/s (730 cu ft/s) (Coatepeque)

The Río Naranjo is a river in south-west Guatemala. Its sources are located in the Sierra Madre mountain range in the western department of San Marcos. From there, it flows past the town of Coatepeque in the department of Quetzaltenango through the coastal plains of Retalhuleu into the Pacific Ocean.

The Naranjo river basin covers an area of 1,273 square kilometres (492 sq mi) with a population of approximately 272,611 people.
