= Río Grande de Zacapa =

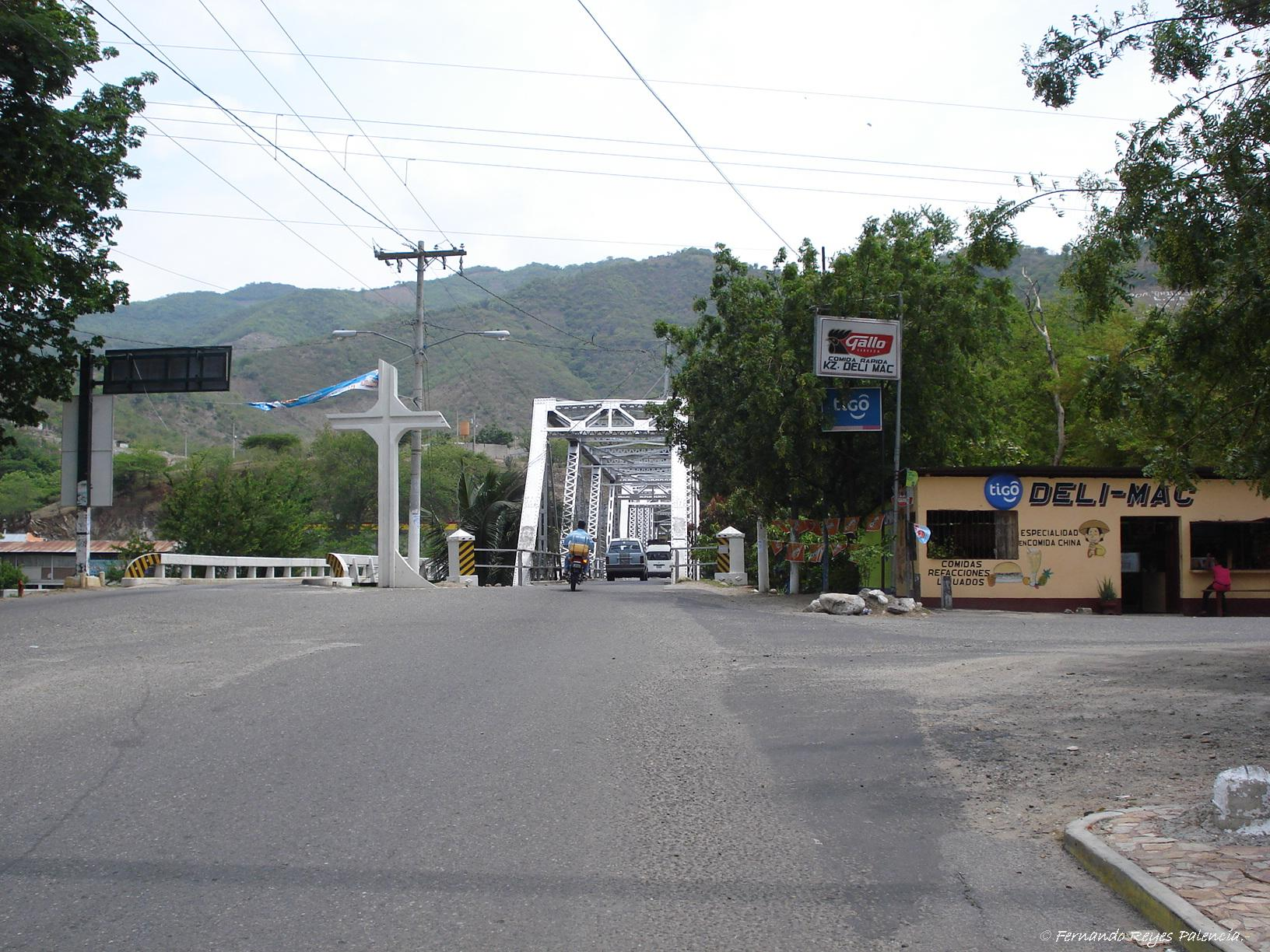

Location
- Country: Guatemala

Physical characteristics
- Source
  - location: Guatemala (Zacapa, Chiquimula)
- Mouth
  - location: Tributary of the Motagua River
- Length: 87 km (54 mi)
- Basin size: 2,462 km^{2} (951 sq mi)
- Discharge
  - average: 28.5 m^{3}/s (1,010 cu ft/s) (Camotán)

The Río Grande de Zacapa is a river in Guatemala. From its sources in the southern mountain range in the departments of Zacapa and Chiquimula, the river flows northwards until it reaches the Motagua River at 15.032048°N 89.555826°W. The Río Grande de Zacapa is 87 kilometres (54 mi) long and its river basin covers an area of 2,462 km² (951 sq ml).
