= Dolores, Guatemala =

Dolores
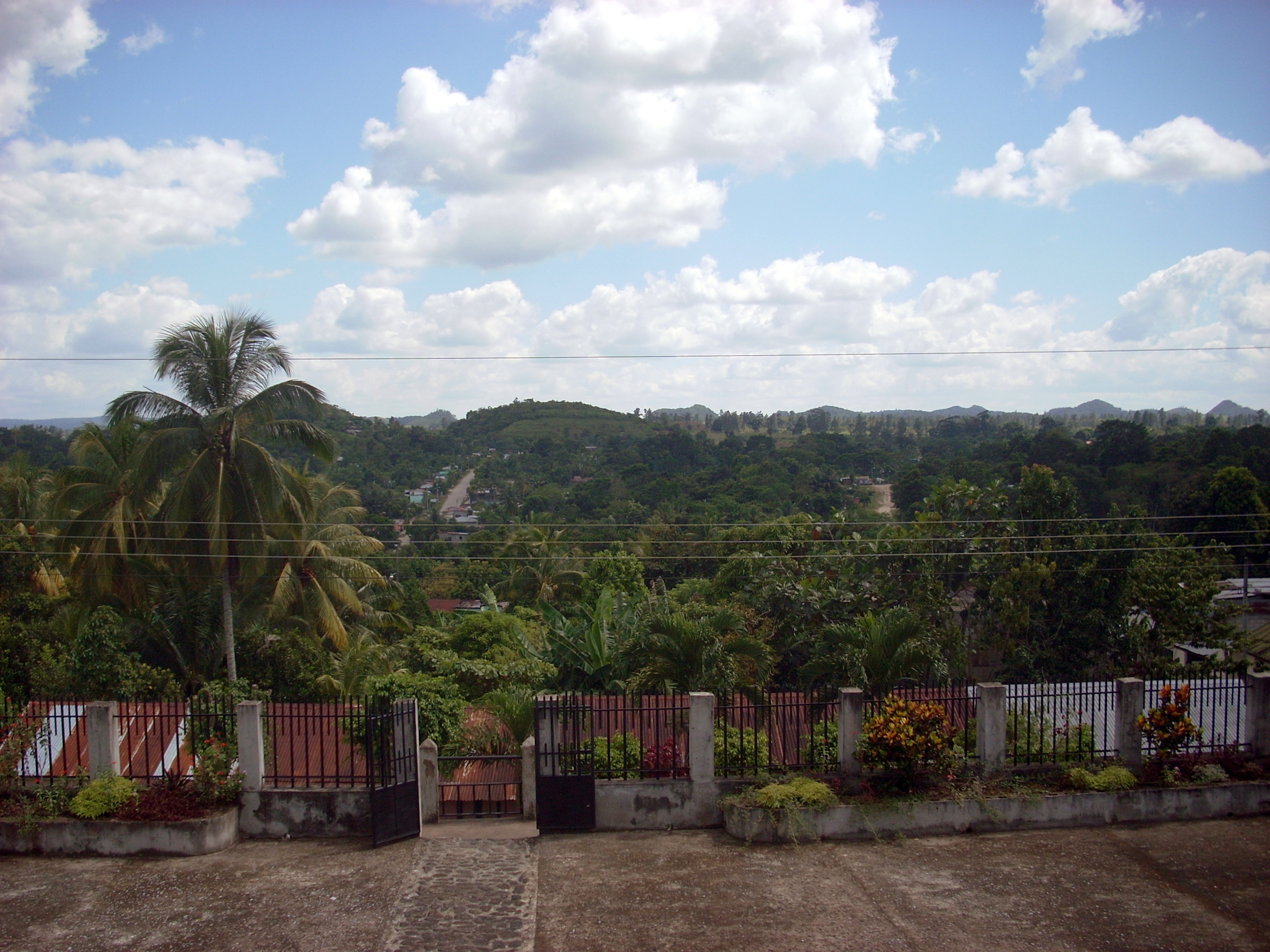

- Location in Guatemala
- Coordinates: 16°30′51″N 89°24′56″W
- Country: Guatemala
- Department: El Petén

Area
  - Total: 1,374 km^{2} (531 sq mi)

Population (2023)
  - Total: 30,546
  - Density: 22.23/km^{2} (57.58/sq mi)
- Climate: Am

Dolores is a city and a municipality in the Petén Department of Guatemala. It covers an area of approximately 1,374 km^{2} (531 sq mi). As per 2023 estimates, it has a population of about 30,546 inhabitants.

== History ==
Archaeological evidence from the area suggests that the region was once part of the Mayan civilization of Mopán, and was known as "Ixtanché" in the Mayan language meaning "wooden bank to rest". In 1695, the Spanish military expedition, led by Juan Díaz de Velasco, established a military presence in the area. A small garrison was left in the area under the command Nicolás Cuevas, which marked the arrival of the first Europeans and Mestizos. Later, this, Franciscan missionaries carried out evangelization of the local population. The name "Dolores" first appears in 1708, when Juan Antonio Ruiz y Bustamante organized the population in the settlement.

After the Guatemalan independence, Dolores appears in administrative records during the early 19th century. It was included administrative divisions during the subsequent reorganization of the territory by the constitution of 1825. In 1836, the settlement was attached to the Santa Ana circuit.

== Geography ==
Dolores is a municipality in the Petén Department in Guatemala. It is spread over an area of 1,374 km^{2} (531 sq mi). It is located in the southeastern part of the department, lying approximately 78 km (48 mi) from the departmental capital of Flores and about 401 km (249 mi) from the national capital of Guatemala City. The municipality borders the municipalities of Melchor de Mencos, Santa Ana, and San Francisco to the east, Poptún to the south, and Sayaxché to the west. It shares land border with Belize to the south-east.

Located at an elevation of 138.11 m (453.1 ft) above sea level, Dolores has a tropical monsoon climate (Köppen climate classification: Am). The municipality has an average annual temperature of 26.77 °C (80.19 °F) and receives about 77.09 mm (3.035 in) of rainfall annually.

== Demographics ==
The municipality had an estimated population of 30,546 inhabitants in 2023. The population consisted of 15,652 males and 14,894 females. About 34.8% of the population was below the age of fourteen, and 6.3% was over the age of 65 years. Majority of the population (71.8%) was classified as urban, while 28.2% lived in rural areas. About 35.1% of the inhabitants were born in the same municipality. Ladinos (90.3%) formed the major ethnic group, with Maya (about 9.7%) forming a minority. The municipality had a literacy rate of 79.9%, and Spanish (91.5%) was the most spoken language.
