= Cuilco River =

- Native name: Río Cuilco (Spanish)

Location
- Countries: Guatemala and Mexico

Physical characteristics
- Source
  - location: Guatemala (Quetzaltenango, San Marcos, Huehuetenango)
  - coordinates: 15.434156°N 92.106800°W
  - elevation: 3,000 m (9,800 ft)
- Mouth
  - location: Presa de La Angostura in Chiapas

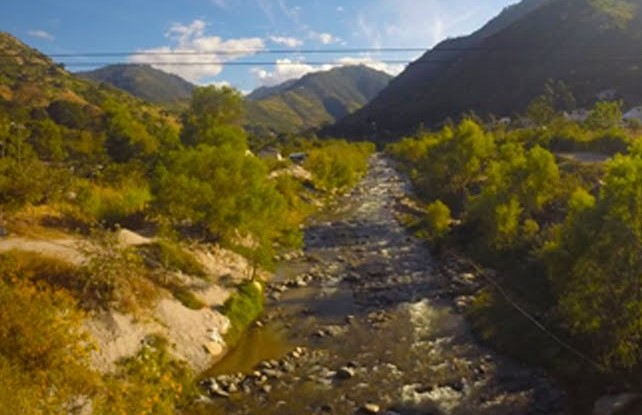
Río Cuilco

The Río Cuilco is a river in Guatemala. The river's sources are located in the Sierra Madre just north of Cajolá where it is called Río Blanco. The Río Blanco joins the Las Manzanas River which in turn joins the San Isidro River to form the Cuilco river. The Cuilco follows its largely northward course through San Marcos, and Huehuetenango, crossing the border with Mexico at 15.434156°N 92.106800°W, continuing its course northwards into the Presa de La Angostura, one of Mexico's largest artificial lakes. The Cuilco river basin covers an area of 2,274 square kilometres (878 mi^{2}) in Guatemala.
