= Volcán Santo Tomás =

Volcano in Guatemala

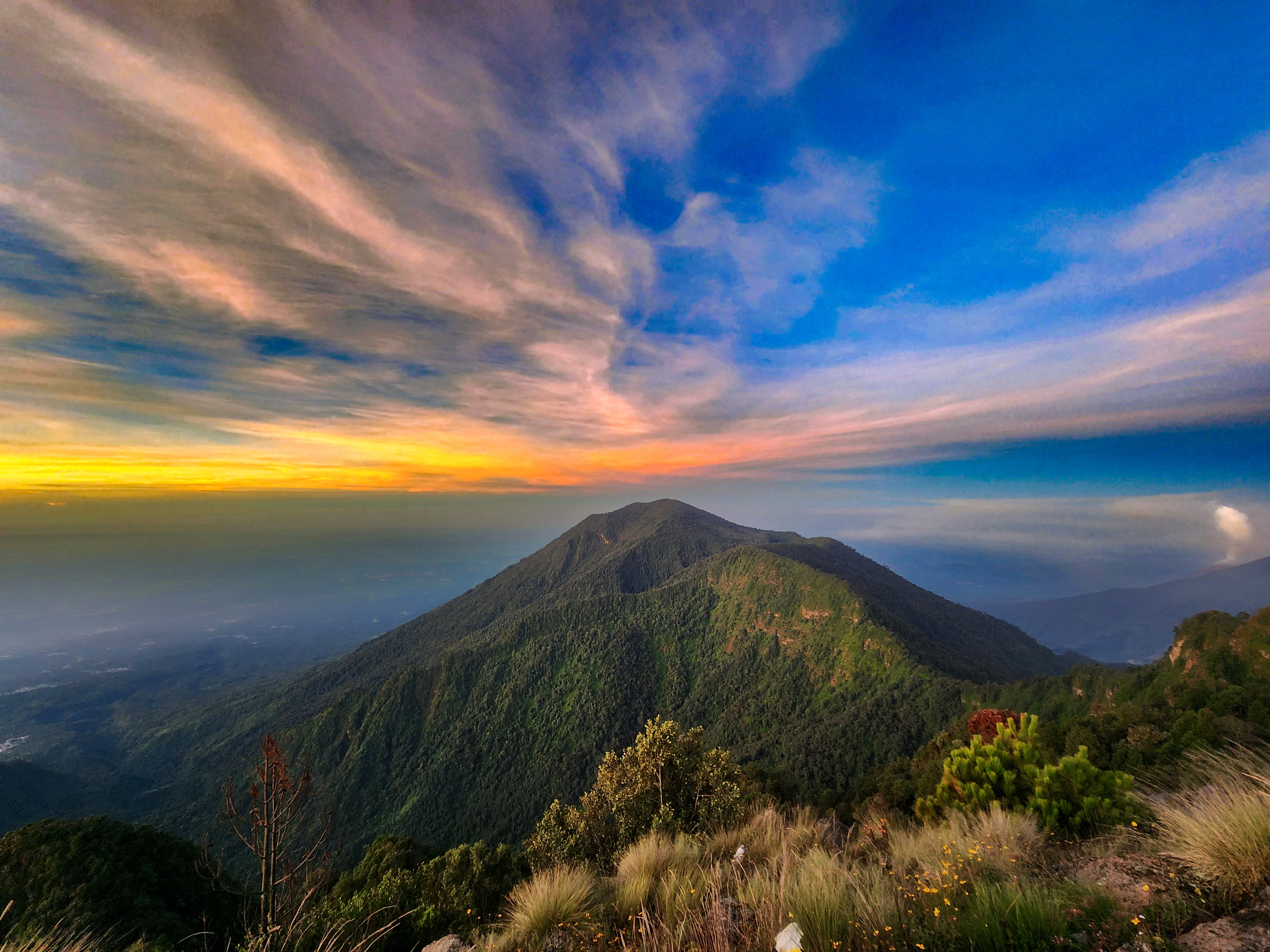
- Santo Tomás viewed from Zunil

Highest point
- Elevation: 3,542 m (11,621 ft)
- Coordinates: 14°42′36″N 91°28′44″W

Geography
- Location within Guatemala
- Location: Guatemala
- Parent range: Sierra Madre

Geology
- Mountain type: Stratovolcano
- Volcanic arc: Central America Volcanic Arc
- Last eruption: Unknown

Volcán Santo Tomás (original indigenous name Qaqpekul) is a stratovolcano in southern Guatemala. Its highest point lies at an altitude of 3,542 m (11,621 ft) above sea level.

It is also known as "Volcán Pecul", or as "Cerro Zunil", the name of its youngest and most prominent dome which was last active approximately 84,000 years ago (K-Ar dating).

Geothermal activity can be observed in the form of Solfataras and thermal springs which are located on the west of the ridge between Santo Tomás and Zunil.

== See also ==
- List of volcanoes in Guatemala
