= Pasión River =

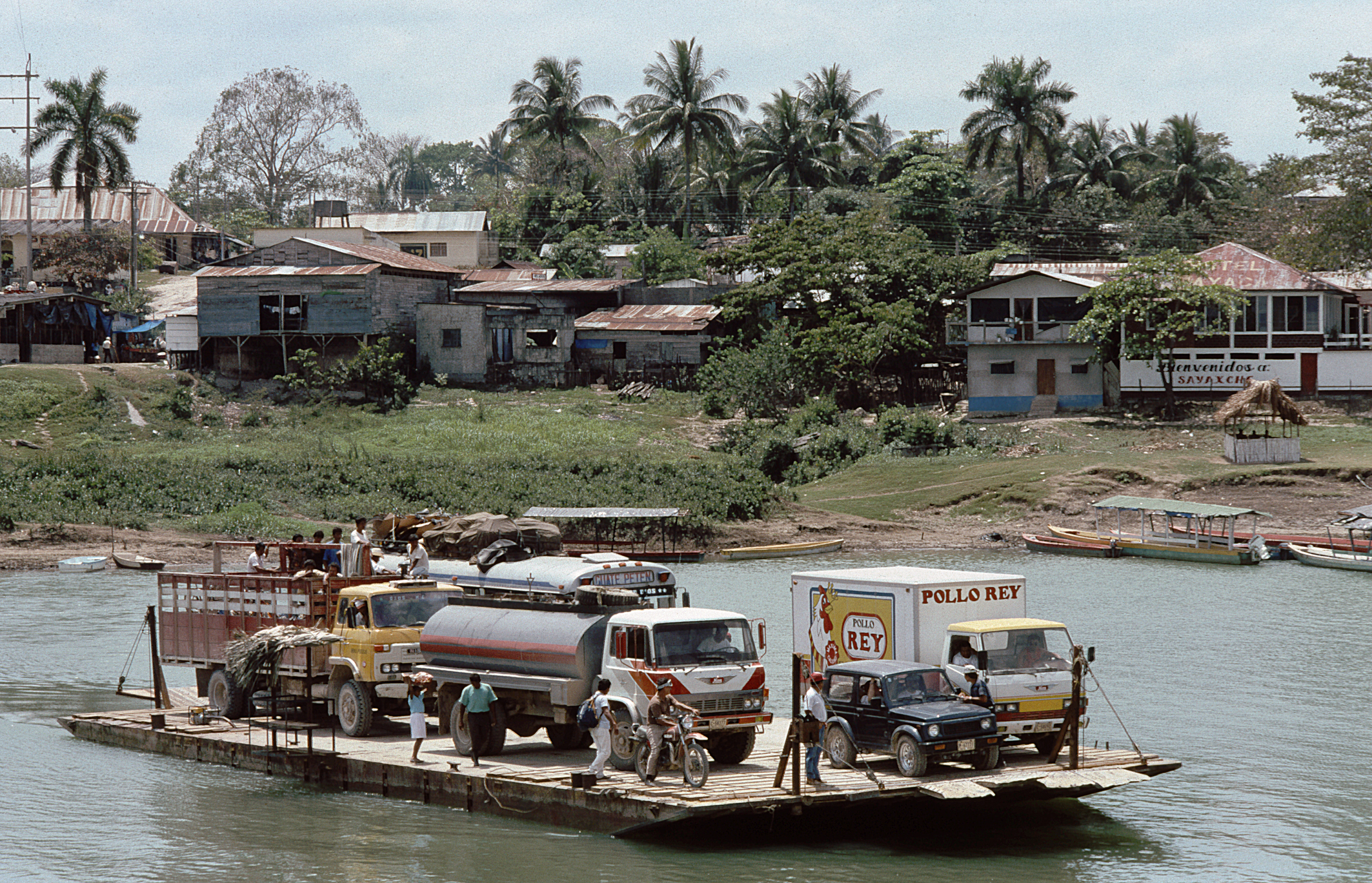
- Car ferry crossing Río la Pasión at Sayaxché (1994)
- Native name: Río de la Pasión (Spanish)

Location
- Country: Guatemala

Physical characteristics
- Source: Río Santa Isabel o Cancuen
  - location: Petén Department, Guatemala
  - coordinates: 15.990152°N 89.981320°W
  - elevation: 200 m (660 ft)
- Mouth: Usumacinta River
  - location: Esperanza
  - coordinates: 16.480881°N 90.543095°W
- Length: 353.9 km (219.9 mi)
- Basin size: 12,156 km^{2} (4,693 sq mi)
- Discharge
  - average: 322.8 m^{3}/s (11,400 cu ft/s)

The Pasión River (Spanish: Río de la Pasión, Spanish pronunciation: [ˈri.o ðe la paˈsjon]) is a river located in the northern lowlands region of Guatemala. The 353.9-kilometre-long (219.9 mi) river is fed by a number of upstream tributaries whose sources lie in the hills of Alta Verapaz. These flow in a general northerly direction to form the Pasión, which then tends westwards to meet up with the Salinas River at 16°28′52″N 90°32′39″W. At this confluence, the greater Usumacinta River is formed, which runs northward to its eventual outlet in the Gulf of Mexico. The Pasión River's principal tributaries are the San Juan River, the Machaquila River, and the Cancuén River.

The riverine drainage system of the Pasión and its tributaries covers an area of over 5,000 square kilometres (1,900 mi^{2}) and forms a watershed for a substantial portion of the present-day Guatemalan department of Petén's western half. (Note: INSIVUMEH data suggest the river basin covers a territory of 12,156 square kilometres (4,693 mi^{2}).)

The Pasión river basin is recognized as an archaeological region or zone, and contains a number of archaeological sites of the pre-Columbian Maya civilization, which to an extent shared some commonalities in Maya architectural style, political history and glyphic conventions. Maya ceremonial and urban centers located within the region include Dos Pilas, Tamarindito, Altar de Sacrificios, Aguateca, Seibal and Machaquila.

== Pollution ==
On June 6, 2015, residents around La Pasión River reported finding of a high count of dead fish floating in the river. On June 11, 2015, Guatemala's authorities inspected palm oil company "Reforestadora de Palmas de Petén, S.A." (REPSA), located in Sayaxché, and found traces of Malathion, a pesticide, in the company's tributaries leading to La Pasión River. Tranquilino Xojalaj, administrator of REPSA, declared that heavy rain caused the treatment wells to flood into the river, however the company denied responsibility, stating that they do not use Malathion as a pesticide.

By June 15, 2015, dead fish had been found over 105 kilometres (65 mi) downstream. The pollution might have entered the Usumacinta River, which travels all the way to México.

== See also ==
- Petexbatún

== Notes and references ==
=== Bibliography ===
- Houston, Stephen D. (1993). Hieroglyphs and History at Dos Pilas: Dynastic Politics of the Classic Maya. Austin: University of Texas Press. pp. 4 and 10. ISBN 0-292-73855-2.
