= Nahualate River =

River in Guatemala

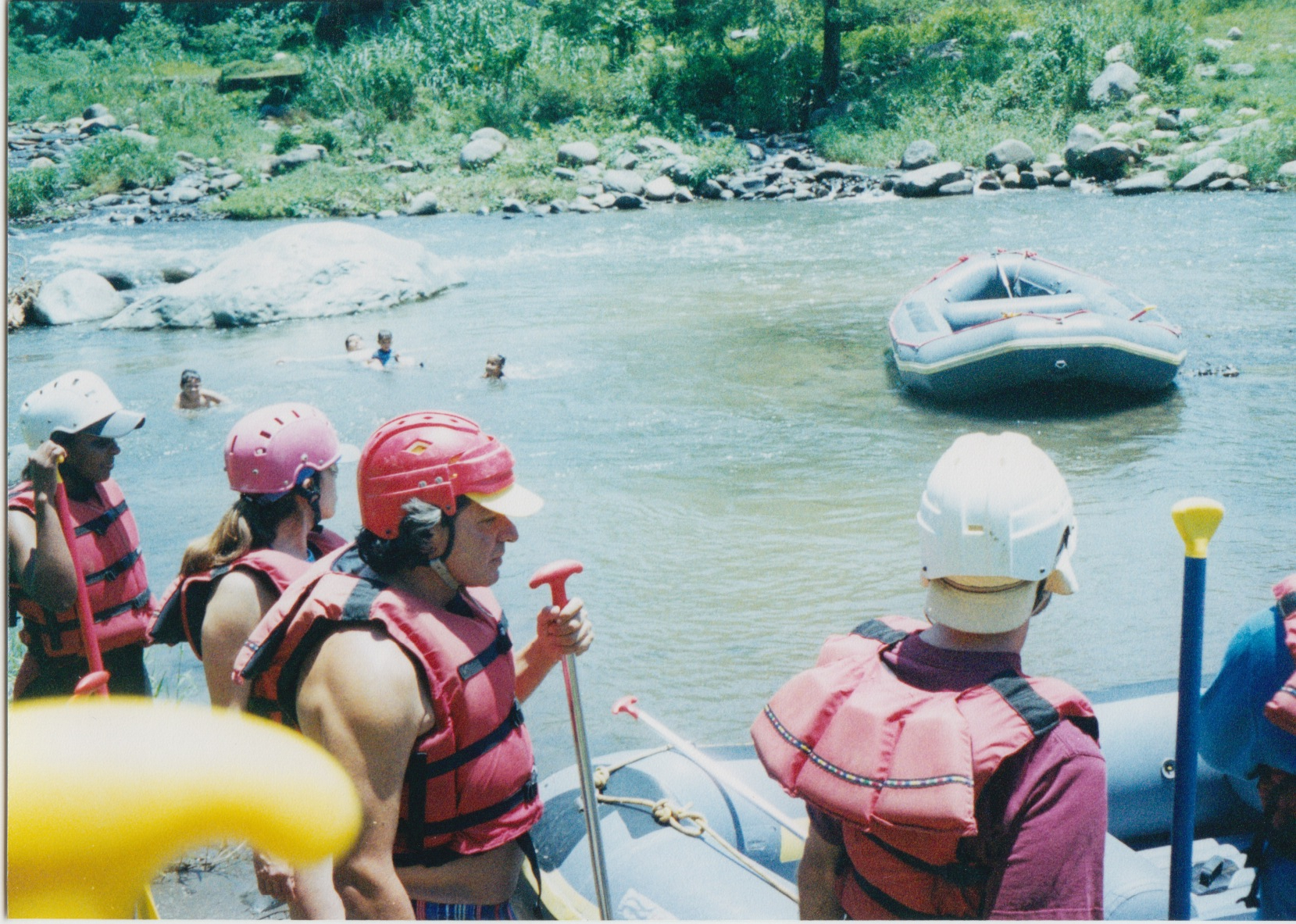

- Location of mouth
- Native name: Río Nahualate (Spanish)

Location
- Country: Guatemala

Physical characteristics
- Source
  - location: Guatemala (Sololá, Suchitepéquez)
  - coordinates: 14.881253°N 91.287546°W
  - elevation: 3,000 m (9,800 ft); Santa Catarina Ixtahuacán
- Mouth
  - location: Pacific Ocean
  - coordinates: 14.045877°N 91.538343°W
  - elevation: 0 m (0 ft)
- Length: 130 km (81 mi)
- Basin size: 1,941 km^{2} (749 sq mi)
- Discharge
  - average: 60.8 m^{3}/s (2,150 cu ft/s) at San Mauricio

The Río Nahualate (Spanish pronunciation: [nawaˈlate]) is a river in southwest Guatemala, originating in the Sierra Madre range, in the vicinity of Santa Catarina Ixtahuacán and Nahualá (Sololá). From there it flows southwards through the coastal lowlands of Suchitepéquez and Escuintla to the Pacific Ocean.

The Nahualate river basin covers a territory of 1,941 square kilometres (749 sq mi).
