= Coyolate River =

River in Guatemala

Coyolatea River
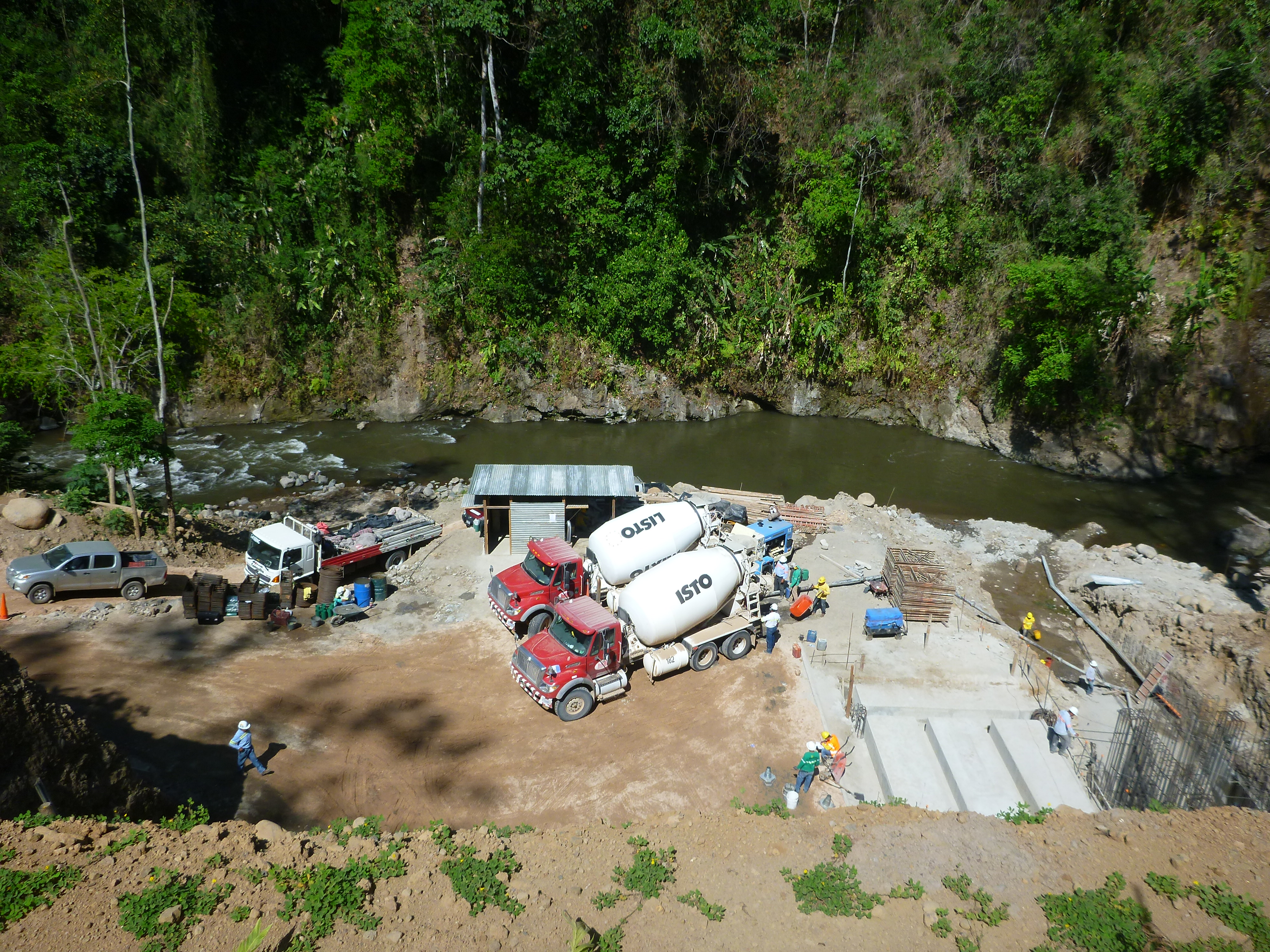

- Location of mouth
- Native name: Río Coyolate (Spanish)

Location
- Country: Guatemala

Physical characteristics
- Source
  - location: Guatemala (Chimaltenango, Suchitepéquez)
  - coordinates: 14.454712°N 91.095457°W
  - elevation: 2,400 m (7,900 ft)
- Mouth
  - location: Pacific Ocean
  - coordinates: 13.953976°N 91.311493°W
  - elevation: 0 m (0 ft)
- Length: 155 km (96 mi)
- Discharge
  - average: 15.6 m^{3}/s (550 cu ft/s) (at Puente Coyolate)

The Río Coyolate is a river in southwest Guatemala. Its sources are located in the Sierra Madre mountain range, in the department of Chimaltenango. It flows southwards through the coastal lowlands of Suchitepéquez and Escuintla to the Pacific Ocean.

The Coyolate river basin covers a territory of 1,648 square kilometres (636 mi^{2}). It has a length of 155 km (96 ml).
