= Maya warfare =

Warfare of the Mesoamerican civilization

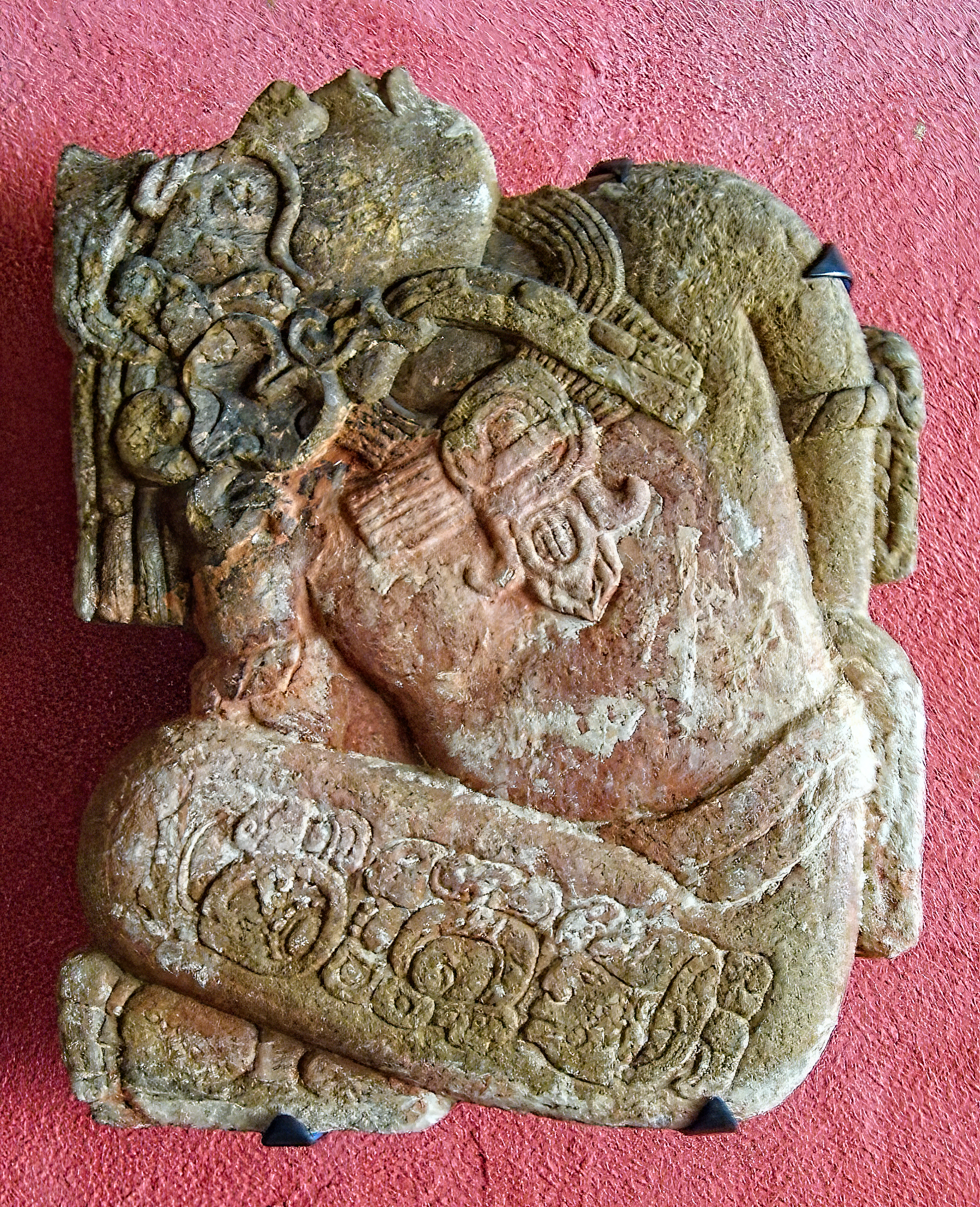
Sculpture of a Maya prisoner of war in the site museum of Toniná

Although the Maya were once thought to have been peaceful, current theories emphasize the role of inter-polity warfare as a factor in the development and perpetuation of Maya society. The goals and motives of warfare in Maya culture are not thoroughly understood, but scholars have developed models for Maya warfare based on several lines of evidence, including fortified defenses around structure complexes, artistic and epigraphic depictions of war, and the presence of weapons such as obsidian blades and projectile points in the archaeological record. Warfare can also be identified from archaeological remains that suggest a rapid and drastic break in a fundamental pattern due to violence.

Maya polities engaged in violent warfare for political control of people and resources. Recent scholarship argues that Maya warfare was not primarily aimed at territorial expansion but instead focused on the capture of prisoners and imposing tributary relationships. Along with this, the Mayan would take control of much territory for resources. Among the most critical resources were water and agricultural land. Economic control of resources such as obsidian also increased competition among polities. As polities became more successful, they also became more complex. This led to improved efficiency in acquiring and holding valued resources, especially through military force. Population growth increased the competition between polities, resulting in increased levels of violence.

== Ideological roots, tactics, organization, and weaponry ==
=== Ideology ===
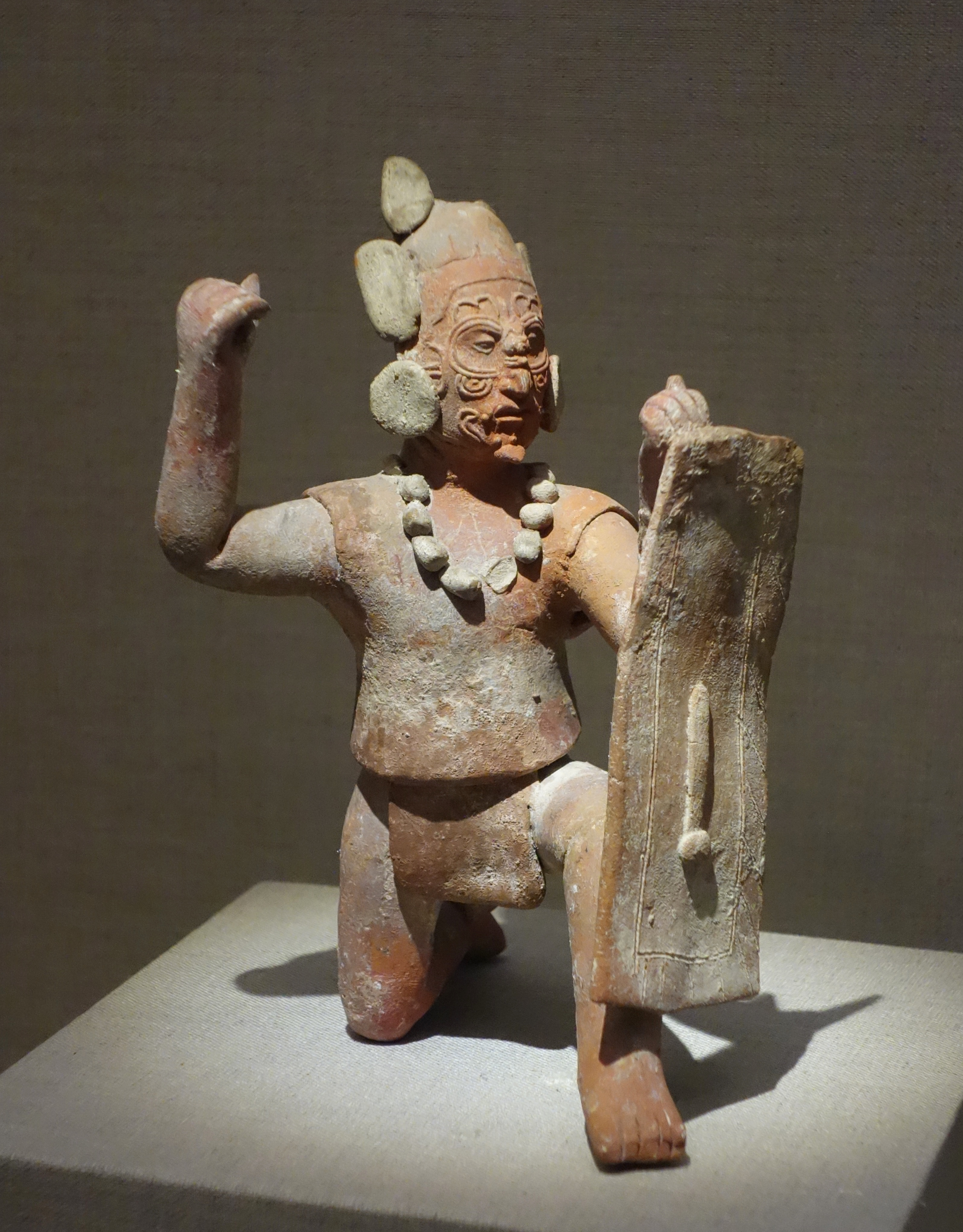
A figurine of Maya warrior with facial scarification, 600–800 AD

Warfare was likely a driving force of cultural change. Although warring leaders undoubtedly benefited materially, one of the main goals may have been to acquire sacrificial victims. Sacrifice not only legitimized the ruler by intimidating rivals and awing the citizens, but was also associated with concepts of sacred fluids and the passage of time. Sacrificial captives were deemed a part of the flesh and blood of the captor, showing the great respect for the prisoners of war. Warfare is alluded to in the mythology of the Popol Vuh, which describes sacrifice through decapitation. Certain events such as the death of a leader or birth of an heir may have required sacrifice.

Another possible goal in warfare was to seize sacred objects and impose tributary relations. The possession of religious objects would signify the religious defeat of rival neighbors. Scholars believe that, instead of taking complete control of neighboring lands, the Maya imposed tribute on the defeated. This would inherently increase economic growth and society without having complete control.

=== Tactics and organization ===
Little can be known about how the ancient Maya planned and coordinated their attacks. However, it has been noted that the Maya cities kept some distance between themselves and their enemies with an estimated mean distance of 55 km (about two to eight day's travel) between major settlements.

This may support the theory that war was fought by and for elites; that is, the Maya and non-Maya nobility. This may be because of the long distances that had to be traveled between cities. One estimate puts about 500-1000 men on the battlefield on each side of the conflict at maximum based on estimates about the logistics of the journey, such as amount of weight carried and how much food was needed on the journey.

Some Maya raids were deliberately timed to coincide with major religious festivals, maximizing surprise. In the 744 AD attack on Naranjo, the Maya chose to attack during the New Year ceremony when defenses were lowered. Maya war theory relied on surprise and deliberate planning.

Military organization is somewhat unclear. Leadership seems to have been embodied mostly in the Halach Uinik, the ajaw or lord of each geopolitical unit, known as a batab.

Although the Maya had projectile technology, such as the atlatl and spear, much of the actual fighting was done at close range with "thrusting, stabbing, and crushing". Weapons were crafted mostly from obsidian and chert, obsidian being the sharpest (but more brittle). Knapping chert or obsidian into bifacial projectile points and attaching them to atlatl darts, spears, and arrows was the dominant technology. Although bows and arrows were used, spears and Macuahuitl remained much more common. As well, chipped flint was common in close range combat knives.

Scholars believe that raiding constituted a distinct and widespread form of Maya warfare. These were meant to be small-scale, fast, and targeted. Small raiding parties sought to strike before defenders could mobilize, a pattern consistent with archaeological records. A major part of Maya Warfare included what followed a battle. The capture and sacrifice of high valued targets was the main reason and prospect for war. Sacrifices were made in an attempt for them to communicate with their gods and keep them in their good graces. These statues where they're war sacrificing elites become deeply rooted into the culture, where they idolize becoming a warrior. Having and maintaining this culture of warriorhood is vital to building the culture into the future warriors of the city.

== Archaeological sites with evidence of warfare ==
=== Mayapan ===
Located in the Mexican state of Yucatán, Mayapan is considered to be one of the last major Pre-Columbian Maya settlements. The site had a defensive wall surrounding the structure, and a violent fire was the cause of downfall as evidenced by burnt remains. Mayapan had a sophisticated defensive gate structures, some of which contained defensive watch towers that allowed for them to have viewpoints over the city walls. These viewpoints would allow them to attack intruders using projectiles or melee weapons. The city contains sacrificial sites that were used for war captives, this includes skull racks and glyphs that include floating sacrificial knives around skulls.

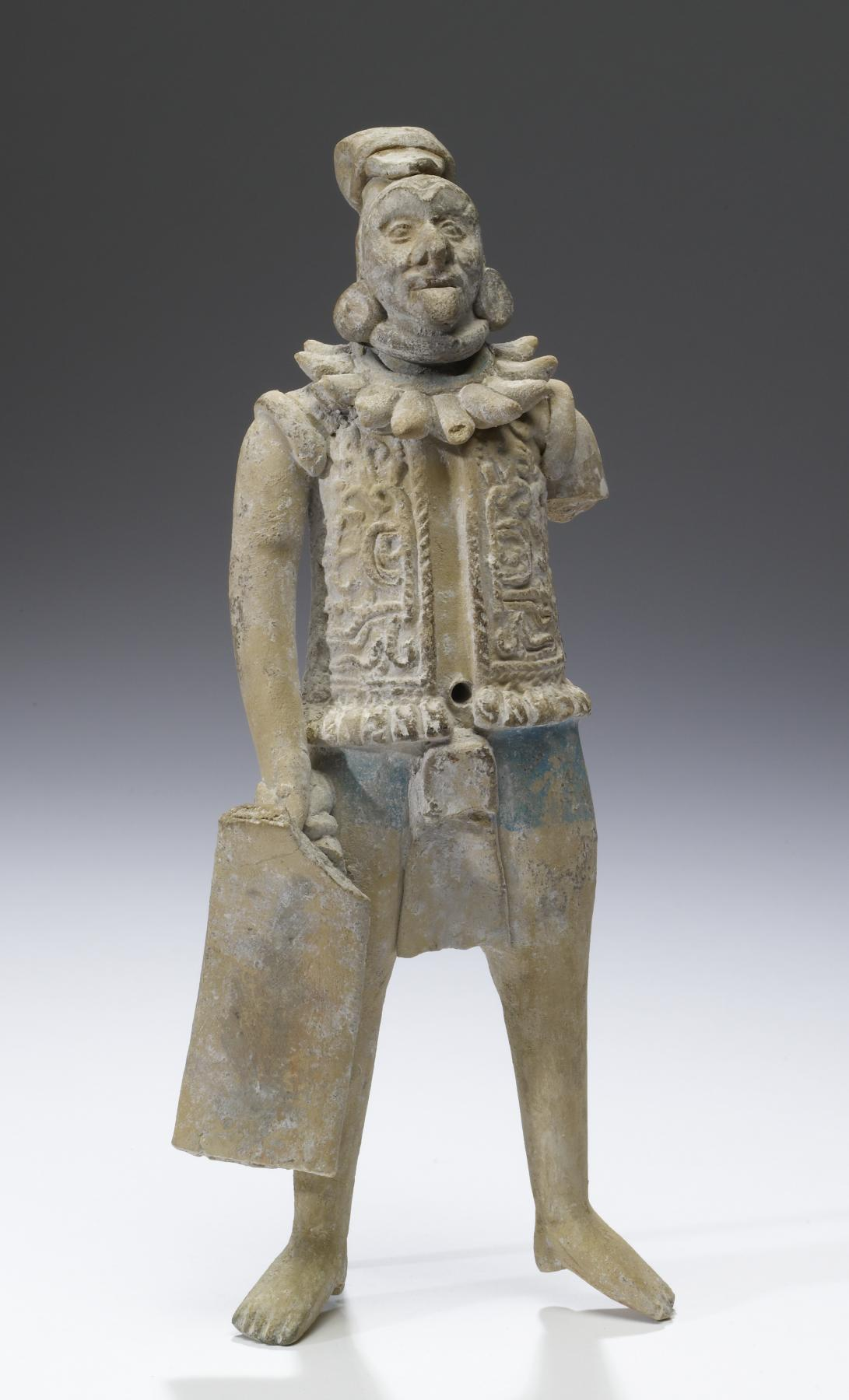
An sculpture of a Maya warrior figurine

=== Aguateca ===
Aguateca is a Classic Maya site located in the south-western Petén department of Guatemala. Aguateca was a member of the Petexbatún States among which included such polities as Seibal, Itzan, Dos Pilas, Cancuén, Tamarindito, Punta de Chimino, and Nacimiento.

The city was built on a 90 m escarpment with defensive fortifications surrounding the city. Archaeological remains, along with epigraphy and iconography at the site reveal an expansion of power and military influence from Aguateca by the ruling dynasty during the 8th century, a period noted for endemic warfare in the region. During this time, 4 km. of defensive walls were hastily constructed concentrically around the site.

Among the weapons found at the site are chert and obsidian bi-facial points, and chert small points which were probably used as arrowheads. Obsidian spear tips, which were found extensively throughout the site, were the primary weapon used based on the number found at the site. Other weapons included darts and atlatl darts.

The site reveals a key feature of Mayan war - that being the involvement of the royal elites in the manufacture and execution of warfare. For example, 30-40 broken chert bifacial points were found in the royal residences of Aguateca, along with small bifacial thinning flakes which were the result of failed bifacial point manufacturing. All obsidian bifacial thinning flakes were found in a royal or elite context. This serves as evidence for the hypothesis that rulers, scribes, and artisans at Aguateca served as warriors.

The city was captured and destroyed approximately 810 AD. The capture led to mass evacuations of the city, as marked by the plethora of remains left at the site. It appears that the goal of the capture was to terminate the influence of Aguateca, not to occupy the city or its power.

=== Colha ===
Colha is located in north-central Belize, about 52 km. north of Belize City in a chert-rich area, Colha offers an in depth look at Maya warfare and collapsed polities during the Terminal Classic. Colha is associated with extensive lithic production ranging in time from the early Classic and into the Post Classic. A huge chert quarry is near Colha, facilitating the production of many chert lithics. In addition, the chert artifacts made in Colha spread to other regions such as Pulltrouser Swamp. These artifacts were then refurbished and reused in each region. The site was captured and later abandoned during the Terminal Classic. The site's demise contains insights into the material motivations for Maya warfare and military strategy. Among the archaeological remains is the Colha Skull Pit, which contained the remains of 30 human skulls. The skull pit is particularly unusual because the faces of the individuals were flayed prior to decapitation. The skin was cut around the skull vault, around the orbital rims and external nasal aperture, inside the mandibular ramus, and along the lower edge of the mandible. Although this pattern is found around the world, it is unusual in Maya ritual.

Another mass grave at Colha was found to have unusual characteristics for a Maya grave site. This suggests that it was not a ritual or sacrificial grave, but was dug during the capture of Colha. Although the site was already an important site of lithic production, archaeological remains show an exponential increase in the volume of stemmed blades produced, which served as the primary weapon in the area. This, along with the large volume of human remains found inside the defensive walls, suggests that perhaps the inhabitants were prepared for an invasion. These remains indicate that the capture of Colha was a strategic move to cut off supply of weapons production for the area by an invader.

=== La Blanca ===
The acropolis of the Classic period site at La Blanca in Petén has produced evidence suggestive of warfare. During the Late Classic there appears to have been greater public access to the acropolis, with stairways communicating between the various terraces leading up to the south range. During the Terminal Classic, these stairways were filled in, as were many of the access doorways to the acropolis itself, with some buildings being sealed completely. This closing of public access to the palace reflects the greater political instability engulfing the entire Petén region at this time. The acropolis complex was abandoned by the city's elite in the Terminal Classic, a time when most of the city centre was also deserted by its residents. Many flint projectile points were recovered from the south terraces of the acropolis, this combined with the remains of two individuals very near the surface indicates that a violent confrontation took place around the time that the city was abandoned.

=== Caracol ===
Caracol, located on the Vaca Plateau of western Belize has been studied by Diane and Arlen Chase since the 1980s. They have identified at least 33 individual war events involving Caracol based on the epigraphy of the site. From the Late Classic period starting around A.D. 550 until the Terminal Classic after A.D. 790, Caracol engaged in a series of wars with neighboring polities such as Tikal, Palenque, Naranjo, and Ucanal. In its early wars with Tikal, Caracol was victorious, ceasing the production of inscribed monuments and constricting settlement patterns at Tikal for 120 years while Caracol expanded. According to Chase and Chase, Naranjo was also defeated by Caracol- the monuments appear to show Caracol kings at Naranjo itself. Based on the distances between the polities (Naranjo is exactly halfway between Tikal and Caracol, 42 kilometers in either direction), the Chases suggest that the takeover of Naranjo is what allowed Caracol to defeat and dominate Tikal for such a long period of time.

=== Becan ===
David L. Webster's work at Becan in the central Yucatán found a ditch with the remains of an embankment on the inner bank surrounding the ceremonial center. Webster noted that even though the population at Becan was probably much smaller than that of Mayapan, the material moved for its wall was much greater in volume.

=== Tikal ===
The 1966 discovery of a 9.5 kilometer long earthwork north of Tikal's center did much to dispel the notion that the Maya were peaceful. Later reevaluation of the evidence suggested that the earthworks, which were constructed sometime between A.D. 400 and 550, may not have ever been a functional defensive system. However, epigraphic data shows that Tikal participated in violent interactions with other polities, including Caracol (see above).

== Depictions in Maya epigraphy ==
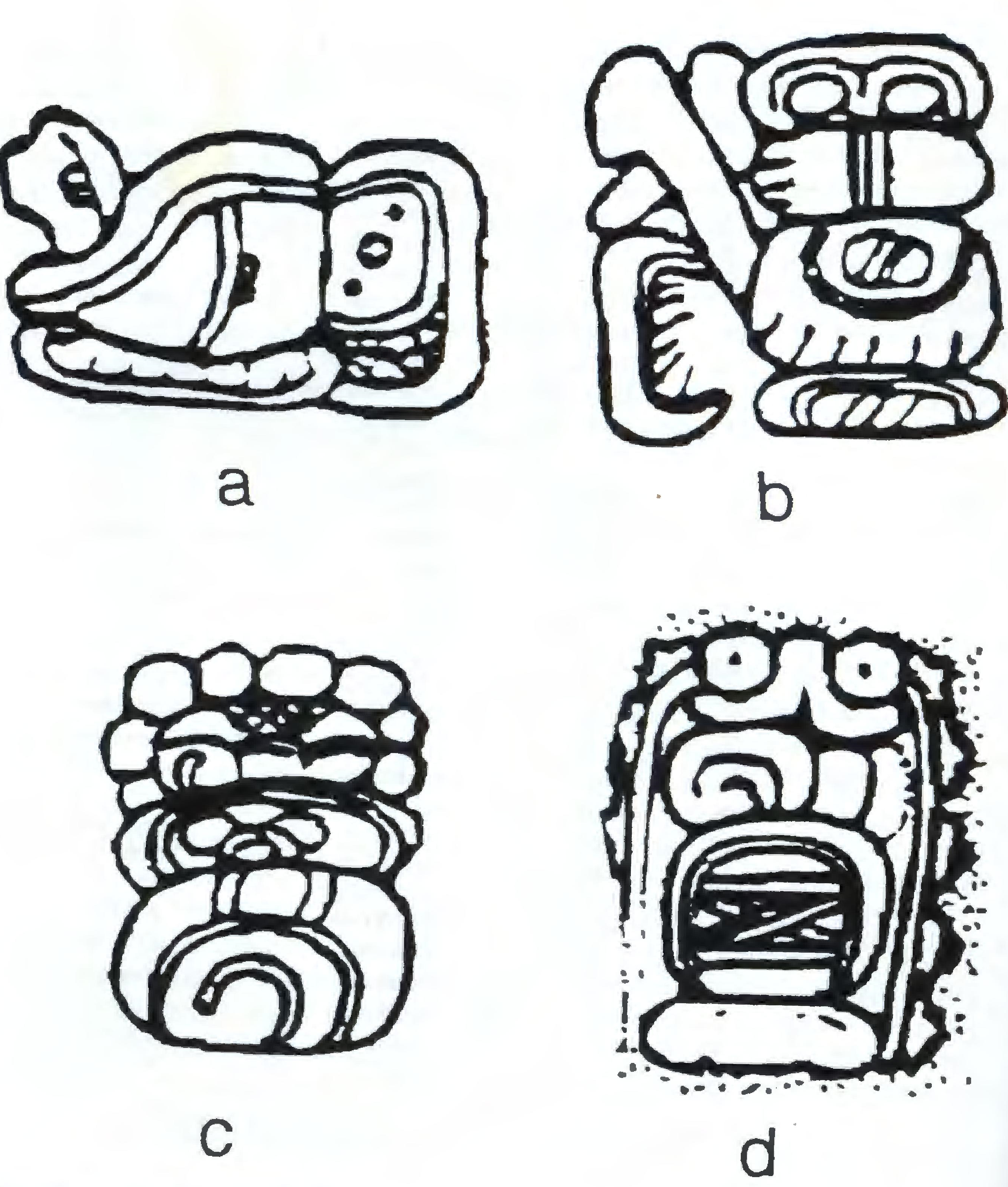
a. chucʼah b. chʼak c. hubi d. star-war From Ancient Mesoamerican Warfare, p 174.

Scholars have identified four examples of Maya hieroglyphs that refer to different kinds of Maya warfare. There is considerable variation and other glyphs also relate to violence, but these are the most generally identifiable.

=== Chucʼah (Capture) ===
Tatiana Proskouriakoff first identified this glyph in 1960. It generally depicts a bound individual or individuals. There is some debate over whether the figures represent the capture of specific people or symbolize towns or polities.

=== Chʼak (Decapitation or "axe event") ===
The Chʼak glyph is interpreted as a decapitation (presumably of an important individual) or a major battle. They seem to be important to the victor but do not refer to the complete destruction of the loser and in most cases may have not affected the defeated polity much at all.

=== Hubi (Destruction) ===
This glyph seems to refer to the "attainment of specific goals and objectives in warfare". It is frequently used in reference to the wars between Naranjo and Caracol.

=== "Star-war" or "shell-star" event ===
The star-war is interpreted to be the most important kind of warfare event represented in the iconographic record. It represents a major war resulting in the defeat of one site by another. This represents the installation of a new dynastic line of rulers at a site, complete dominion of one site over another, or a successful war of independence by a formerly dominated site.

== Warfare as a cause of Maya collapse ==
Endemic warfare is often cited as the cause of the collapse or disappearance of the Maya civilization and abandonment of what are now ruins. Although warfare certainly played a role in the transition to the Terminal or Postclassic, overpopulation, environmental degradation, and drought all played a role in the change of Maya society. The most detailed archaeological information on this phenomenon comes from sites of the Petexbatún state and more recent investigations at the Río Pasión site of Cancuén.

== Misconceptions ==
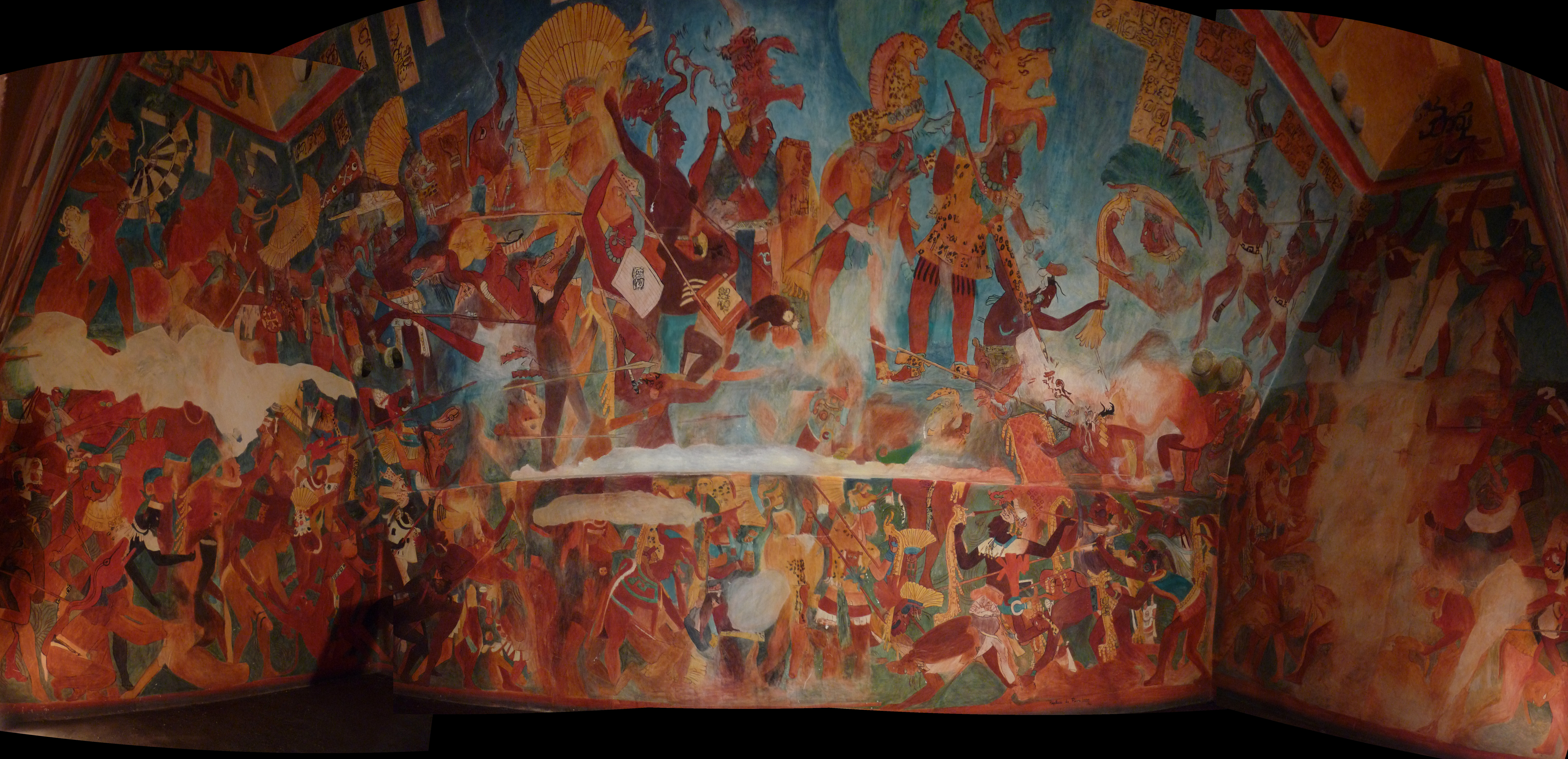
The discovery of the Bonampak murals, representing war scenes, contradicted ancient pacifist theories that idealized ancient Maya (reproduction exhibited at Museo Nacional de Antropología, Mexico City).

The prevalent theory on the ancient Maya at the beginning of the 20th century held on to the notion that they had a predominantly peaceful society, idealizing the indigenous culture much like a noble savage. This view erroneously shifted as the result of poorly documented analysis of iconography and the content of Maya script.

== Ancient Maya warfare in popular culture ==
Maya warfare is present in the 2006 film Apocalypto, directed by Mel Gibson. The film depicts an attack on a small village by warriors from a larger polity for the purpose of capturing men to be sacrificed atop a pyramid during a solar eclipse.

The 1963 film Kings of the Sun starts with the conflict between Chichén Itzá warriors using obsidian weapons and invaders led by Hunac Ceel using "ahistorical" metal swords. Also ahistorical are catapults and probably fire trenches.

== See also ==
- Aztec warfare
- Muisca warfare
- Inca warfare

== Bibliography ==
- Aoyama, Kazuo (2005). "Classic Maya Warfare and Weapons spear, dart, and arrow points of Aguateca and Copan". Ancient Mesoamerica. 16 (2). Cambridge University Press: 291–304. doi:10.1017/s0956536105050248. ISSN 0956-5361. OCLC 359655652. S2CID 162394344.
- Barrett, Jason W.; Andrew K. Scherer (2005). "Stones Bones and Crowded Plazas Evidence for Terminal Classic Maya warfare at Colha, Belize". Ancient Mesoamerica. 16 (1). Cambridge University Press: 101–18. doi:10.1017/s0956536105050091. ISSN 0956-5361. OCLC 364883700. S2CID 162998916.
- Chacon, Richard J.; David H. Dye (2007). The Taking and Displaying of Human Body Parts as Trophies by Amerindians. New York: Springer. pp. 733–799. OCLC 318298644.
- Sharer, Robert J.; Loa P. Traxler (2006). The Ancient Maya (6th (fully revised) ed.). Stanford, CA: Stanford University Press. ISBN 0-8047-4817-9. OCLC 57577446.
- Vidal Lorenzo, Cristina; Juan Antonio Valdés; Gaspar Muñoz Cosme (2007). "El Clásico Terminal y el abandono de los palacios de La Blanca, Petén" (PDF). XX Simposio de Investigaciones Arqueológicas en Guatemala, 2006 (edited by J.P. Laporte, B. Arroyo and H. Mejía) (in Spanish). Museo Nacional de Arqueología y Etnología, Guatemala. pp. 561–576. Archived from the original (PDF online publication) on 2011-09-14.
- Vidal Lorenzo, Cristina; Gaspar Muñoz Cosme (n.d.). Guatemala: La ciudad Maya de La Blanca (in Spanish). Madrid, Spain: Museo Nacional Centro de Arte Reina Sofía. pp. 45–50.
- Webster, David (2000). "The Not So Peaceful Civilization: A Review of Maya War". Journal of World Prehistory. 14 (1). New York: Plenum Press: 65–119. doi:10.1023/A:1007813518630. ISSN 0892-7537. OCLC 15255571. S2CID 159563593.
