= La Amelia =

Archaeological site in Sayaxché, Guatemala

- Location within Guatemala
- 16°31′35″N 90°25′22″W
- Periods: Late Classic
- Cultures: Maya
- Location: Sayaxché
- Region: Petén Department, Guatemala

History
- Abandoned: mid-9th century AD
- Event(s): Conquered by: Dos Pilas

Site notes
- Architectural style: Classic Maya
- Excavation dates: 1937, 1984–1986, 1997
- Archaeologists: Edwin Shook, Antonia Foias

La Amelia is a Pre-Columbian Maya archaeological site near Itzan, in the lower Pasión River region of the Petén Department of Guatemala. It formed a polity in the Late Classic (AD 600 to 830), and was involved in the war between Tikal and Calakmul followed, in 650, by La Amelia's takeover by Dos Pilas. Two centuries of intermittent warfare followed until the area's population was so diminished by about 830, that this is considered the beginning of abandonment of Classic sites in the region.

== Location ==
La Amelia is located on a series of low hills in the municipality of Sayaxché, 4 kilometres (2.5 mi) south of La Florida and the Pasión River. The site sits at a level of 150 to 160 metres (490 to 520 ft) above mean sea level. The low-lying areas around the hills are prone to flooding. The main site area is maintained as a forest park by the nearby village of San Francisco El Tumbo. More than 90 percent of the mounds at the site have been looted.

== History ==
La Amelia was a subordinate site in the Classic Period Petexbatún kingdom of Mutal that was first ruled from Dos Pilas and then from Aguateca. The site is located to the northwest of Dos Pilas, and may have originally been called B'ahlam. The rapidly expanding Dos Pilas kingdom conquered La Amelia in the early 8th century. The occupational history of La Amelia appears to have been brief and limited to the Late Classic.

In AD 802 the last known ruler of the kingdom, Tan Te' K'inich, supervised a ritual conducted by the ruler of La Amelia, Lachan K'awiil Ajaw Bot, the last reference anywhere to Tan Te' K'inich. Lachan K'awiil Ajaw Bot, the local La Amelia king, is depicted on La Amelia Panel 2, dated to AD 804 and continued to raise monuments at the site, the last of which that can be dated was erected in 807 and contains the last reference to the Petexbatún kingdom of Mutal. Lachan K'awiil Ajaw Bot is also mentioned on Panel 1 and Hieroglyphic Stairway 1 at the site. He is known to have been born on 25 June 760 and to have been enthroned on 1 May 802.

La Amelia was abandoned some time in the middle of the 9th century AD.

=== Modern history ===
The Carnegie Institution carried out investigations at the site in 1937. That project documented several carved stone monuments, and created a partial site map which was published by Sylvanus Morley in his 1938 volume The Inscriptions of Peten. Yale University carried out further investigations from 1984 to 1986.

A mapping and excavation project was conducted at the site by the La Amelia Archaeological Project in 1997. That work was directed by Dr. Antonia Foias of Williams College. During the summer 1997 field season, the La Amelia Archaeological Project completed mapping of the central site area and excavated several test units.

== The site ==
La Amelia is a small site covering an area of approximately 0.74 square kilometres (0.29 sq mi). The site is divided into four groups, two of which have monumental architecture, and a further 13 smaller residential groups. The 1997 mapping project recorded a total of 71 structures at the site. The central plaza area appears to have been focused around the "Group of the Three Pyramids" in the southern portion of the site. That group included three pyramids of between 3 and 8 metres (9.8 and 26.2 ft) in height, all of which have been severely damaged by looter trenches.

The "Group of the Hieroglyphic Stairway" is situated 0.5 kilometres (0.31 mi)north of the main plaza, in the northwest quadrant of the site, and was constructed principally by terracing and flattening the summit of a natural hill. This group exhibits three frontal terraces, and an interior courtyard on the summit which is surrounded by six narrow range structures. Access to the lowest terrace is achieved via a 5-step monolithic stairway featuring limestone blocks carved with glyphs and scenes. Two carved panels (called alternately Stela 1 and Panel 2) originally decorated the front of the structure to either side of the stairway.

=== Monuments ===
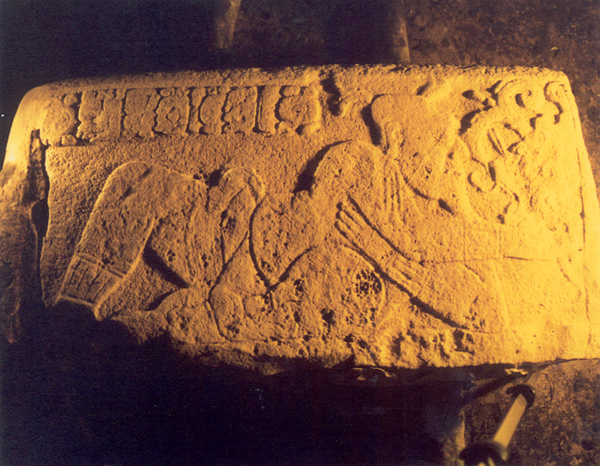
Step 7 from the Hieroglyphic Stairway

When Edwin M. Shook of the Carnegie Institution first documented the site of La Amelia in 1937, he noted the presence of six hieroglyphic blocks which functioned as risers along the uppermost level of the monolithic stairway. This led him to identify the Hieroglyphic Stairway at the site, and to name the associated architectural group accordingly. A seventh carved block was recovered in 1997 from a test unit excavated on the plaza immediately southwest of the staircase.

Three of the carved stones from the Hieroglyphic Stairway were entirely glyphic, while the four remaining stones (including the one recovered in 1997) feature reclining male figures along with short texts. Stephen Houston documented one of the three glyphic stones, although no record exists of the other two. Shook sketched the three steps he saw that depicted human figures, but did not include any details regarding the glyphic texts on those stones. None of the six steps recorded by Shook remained in situ by 1997, and their ultimate disposition is unknown.

The four carved steps featuring human figures from the Hieroglyphic Stairway at La Amelia all display images of simply-dressed males, who were likely ancestors of the site's ruler. All four of these figures hold heads or masks of God K. The panel discovered in 1997 included a Calendar Round date of 2 Caban 2 Muan, and an associated text describing a ritual involving God K which took place on that date. The emblem glyph for the figure on this panel may be that of Tamarindito.

The carved panels which originally flanked the Hieroglyphic Stairway at La Amelia depict dancing rulers in full ceremonial costume, as well as glyphic texts. A lower register on each monument depicts a reclining jaguar which looks up at the dancing ruler. Panel 2 records a date of AD 804 and depicts the ruler Lachan K'awiil Ajaw Bot dressed as a ballplayer. Panel 2 now resides in front of the Mayor's building in Sayaxché. Stela 1 was originally located west of the Hieroglyphic Stairway and records a date of AD 807. Stela 1 now resides at the National Museum of Anthropology and Ethnology in Guatemala City.
