= Chanal Balam =

King of Tamarindito, Guatemala

Chanal Balam was the only known king of Maya city-state Tamarindito in Guatemala. The sculptures at Tamarindito indicate a long dynastic history with more than 25 rulers, although only a few can be named, and one of them is Chanal Balam.

He ruled c.760–761.

He was enthroned in 760 and on 26 January 761 Tamarindito defeated the city of Dos Pilas, and Chanal Balam either captured K'awiil Chan K'inich, the last king of Dos Pilas, or sent him into exile. This rebellion of Tamarindito and its allies against Dos Pilas left the defeated city all but abandoned and destabilised the entire Petexbatún region.

The salvage excavation of a looters' tunnel in Structure 44, a poorly constructed 8th-century temple, revealed that the loose rubble infill of the temple had collapsed the tunnel before it reached a royal tomb, which was left intact. The tomb was excavated by Juan Antonio Valdés and was discovered to be that of Chanal Balam. The funerary temple containing the tomb possesses inscriptions celebrating Chanal Balam's great victory over his former overlord.
