= Arroyo de Piedra =

Maya archaeological site in Guatemala

Coordinates: 16.46°N 90.26°W

Arroyo de Piedra is a pre-Columbian Maya archaeological site in Guatemala located approximately 2-3 km east/northeast of Dos Pilas and 3 km west of Tamarindito. The site dates to the middle half of the Classic period. While initially a center of some regional importance, with the rise of Dos Pilas, Arroyo de Piedra was subsumed as a secondary center within the Petexbatun region.

The architecture of Arroyo de Piedra is different from that of Dos Pilas and nearby Aguateca, but bears similarities to Tamarindito. Hieroglyphic data shows that together Arroyo de Piedra and Tamarindito formed an independent polity prior to the establishment of Dos Pilas by Tikal. It appears that Arroyo de Piedra was abandoned during the 8th century following the collapse of Dos Pilas and the disintegration of the polity centered there.

== See also ==
- List of Maya sites
