= Uchaʼan Kʼan Bʼalam =

- Ajaw

King of Aguateca
- Reign: ?-770
- Successor: Tan Teʼ Kʼinich
- Died: c.770
- Issue: Tan Teʼ Kʼinich
- Religion: Maya religion

Uchaʼan Kʼan Bʼalam was a Maya king of Aguateca, father and predecessor of Tan Teʼ Kʼinich.

Aguateca Stela 19 records a battle that his son fought and also gives the name of Uchaʼan Kʼan Bʼalam.

== Notes ==
- Tan Teʼ Kʼinich
