= Punta de Chimino =

Maya archaeological site in Guatemala

- Location within Guatemala
- 16°25′56″N 90°11′32″W
- Periods: Middle Preclassic – Postclassic
- Cultures: Maya
- Location: Sayaxché
- Region: Petén Department, Guatemala

History
- Abandoned: 10th century AD

Site notes
- Architectural style: Classic Maya
- Excavation dates: 1990–1991, 1994, 1996–1997
- Archaeologists: Claudia Wolley, Arthur Demarest Petexbatun Regional Archaeological Project

Punta de Chimino is a Maya archaeological site in the Petexbatún region of the department of Petén in Guatemala. Occupation at the site dates to the Preclassic and Classic periods of Mesoamerican chronology. Punta de Chimino experienced a population surge in the Late Preclassic, followed by a reduction in occupation levels in the Early Classic and another increase in the Terminal Classic when the city became one of the few population centres to survive the political disintegration of the Petexbatún region after the collapse of the kingdom based at Dos Pilas. The neighbouring city of Seibal on the Pasión River appears to have intervened at Punta de Chimino at this time and to have politically dominated the smaller site.

== Location ==
The site is located on a peninsula on the western side of Lake Petexbatún. In the Late Classic a series of defensive ditches were excavated across the base of this peninsula in order to fortify the site. The peninsula possessed deep fertile soils overlying limestone bedrock and gave easy access to the rich aquatic resources of the lake. Punta de Chimino is one of the better investigated sites along the Pasión River and its tributaries. The site is located south of the modern town of Sayaxché.

== History ==
Punta de Chimino was first settled in the Middle Preclassic period. By the Early Preclassic the city had a sizeable population.

In the Early Classic population levels at Punta de Chimino decreased from their earlier Preclassic levels, this may represent a shift in population towards nucleated settlements at the nearby Petexbatún cities of Tamarindito and Arroyo de Piedra.

Terminal Classic economic activity at Punta de Chimino appears to be a reduced continuation of the earlier Classic Period economic activity and shows no sign of any foreign influence that might have caused the Classic Maya collapse. The site is one of very few locations in the Pasión drainage to have erected major architecture during the Terminal Classic, including a corbel-vaulted temple, large palace platforms and a very large ballcourt. The inhabitants maintained areas of intensive agriculture protected by the defensive moats and the site became the last centre of elite activity to survive in the Petexbatún, at a time when other cities in the region had been reduced to tiny hamlets among the Classic period ruins. The clay used in two styles of Terminal Classic ceramics from Punta de Chimino was from the same source as that used for Seibal ceramics, and had very similar styles of decoration. The stylistic similarities between the two sites indicate that Seibal may well have taken advantage of the political fragmentation of the Petexbatún region in order to take control of Punta de Chimino and exact tribute payment.

Punta de Chimino was probably the last of the Petexbatun capitals to fall when the region fragmented after the defeat of Dos Pilas by its former vassal Tamarindito. Evidence was found by archaeologists that the site had been attacked sometime after AD 760, with the innermost and deepest ditch having a large burnt area scattered with flint spearheads, with more spearheads recovered from the wall lining the top of the ditch. The site declined and was finally abandoned in the 10th century AD.

In the Postclassic period the site underwent a limited reoccupation by people from the central Petén, whose ceramics showed no continuity with the earlier Petexbatún ceramic styles.

=== Modern history ===
Punta de Chimino was badly looted in the second half of the 20th century, extensive damage was caused, including the removal of all exposed sculpture at the site. T. Inomata of the Petexbatún Regional Archaeological Project mapped the site in 1989. The Project carried out further investigations at Punta de Chimino from 1990 to 1991 and in 1994 under the direction of Claudia Wolley and from 1996 to 1997 under the direction of Arthur Demarest.

== Site description ==
The neck of the peninsula was fortified with three moats, one of which was 12 metres (39 ft) deep, each moat was topped by a palisaded wall. The creation of the moats involved the excavation of 38,250 cubic metres (1,351,000 cu ft) of the limestone bedrock, which was then used to build up the ramparts. The innermost and deepest moat was flooded to create an artificial island. The area between these moats was used for intensive agriculture and included box gardens divided by crude stone walls. One of the excavated box gardens was dated to the Terminal Classic and measured 6.9 by 3.7 metres (23 by 12 ft) and was 0.6 metres (2.0 ft) deep. The box gardens were probably fertilised with organic material dredged from the swampy area immediately south of the peninsula, with the addition of night soils from the inhabitants. The combination of moats and walls that protected the peninsula made Punta de Chimino the best defended site in the entire Maya lowlands.

The artificial island created by the excavation of the moats was densely occupied during the Terminal Classic but only one residence was excavated in the area between the moats. The Terminal Classic palaces at the site consisted of wide platforms measuring approximately 10 by 20 metres (33 by 66 ft) and thickly coated in plaster.

The site is divided into three main groups; the North, East and West Groups, with a Main Plaza and an Acropolis.

Structure 2 is a small altar platform to the south of the ballcourt and west of Structure 7. The area around it was used for the placing of altars and stelae. The structure measures 6 by 4.5 metres (20 by 15 ft) and is 1 metre (3.3 ft) tall. Structure 2 was virtually destroyed by a looters' trench sunk into the upper section and measuring 3.2 by 1.8 metres (10.5 by 5.9 ft) and deeper than the structure itself. Rescue excavations discovered a variety of small greenstone artifacts in the spoil including an earspool, two beads and a necklace with a roughly carved face. Three human bones were also recovered although their original context is unknown. Structure 2 had two phases of construction, both tentatively dated to the Late Classic.

Structure 7 is a 5-metre (16 ft) high pyramid on the south side of the Main Plaza. The south and west sides of the pyramid have been damaged by looters. Two burials (Burials 4 and 8) were found under the pyramid. Structure 7 overlies an earlier substructure known as Structure 7 Sub 1, the floor of which lies 2.3 metres (7.5 ft) under the summit of the later phase of construction.

Structure 59 is one of the main structures in the West Group.

Structure 70 is one of the principal buildings in the West Group. It is a residential structure located to the northwest of the Main Plaza and stands 4 metres (13 ft) tall. It was built upon a natural hill that was levelled to form a supporting platform. A Late Classic ceramic incense burner was excavated from the summit of the structure, it was modelled to form the Maya sun deity G3. Five low status burials were discovered, four of them interred directly under the floor and one in a crude cist, none of them were accompanied by offerings and all are dated to the Late Classic.

Structure 72 is a large platform located immediately to the east of Structure 70. It measures 5 by 9.5 metres (16 by 31 ft) and has a base of finely worked stone. The structure was a mid-status residential building dating to the Late Classic and included a kitchen measuring 4 by 1.8 metres (13.1 by 5.9 ft) where more than 600 ceramic fragments were excavated together with animal bones.

Structure 76 is a high platform situated in an open area 90 metres (300 ft) west of Structure 7. It has been badly damaged by looters. Rescue excavations by archaeologists uncovered Burial 10 at a depth of 3.3 metres (11 ft) under the building.

Structure 79 is a large elite platform grouped with Structures 80 and 81 in the North Group. It was associated with Seibal-style artifacts and has been dated to the Terminal Classic.

Structure 80 is in the North Group. It is on the north side of the group comprising Structures 79, 80 and 81. It was a large elite platform associated with Seibal-style artifacts. It dates to the Terminal Classic and was completely coated in stucco.

Structure 81 is grouped with Structures 79 and 80 in the North Group. It is also a large elite platform dating to the Terminal Classic associated with Seibal-style artifacts. It was a vaulted building built completely from worked stone, although it has now collapsed. Excavations under the floor of the building revealed three ceramic vessels associated with animal remains that included jaguar teeth. A well-preserved decorated vessel was under these and on top of some fragments of human remains, also including teeth.

The Ballcourt at Punta de Chimino dates to the Terminal Classic. It is the largest yet found in the Petexbatún region and is similar in both size and style to the Terminal Classic ballcourt C-9 at the city of Seibal, on the bank of the Pasión River. The ballcourt has open end zones and is unusually large for such a small site, perhaps owing its construction to the political intervention of Seibal.

The site's Hieroglyphic Stairway was buried under a midden dating to the Postclassic period.

=== Burials ===
Burial 4 was interred in a small cist measuring 0.65 by 0.85 metres (2.1 by 2.8 ft), located under Structure 7. By the time the cist was excavated it had been practically destroyed by tree roots, scattering the bones. A rough greenstone pendant was associated with the remains, together with a greenstone bead, a tripod plate, a polychrome ceramic bowl and perforated seashells. The burial has been dated to the beginning of the Late Classic period.

Burial 8 was deposited 0.54 metres (1.8 ft) under the summit of Structure 7. It was not placed within a tomb but rather scattered within the infill of the pyramid. Some of the bones showed evidence of burning. The burial was accompanied by an offering of four ceramic vessels, a broken fragment of obsidian knife and a piece of greenstone. One of these was painted with a hieroglyphic text that indicated that it was the atole-drinking vessel of a lord from the nearby Petexbatún city of Tamarindito. Based on the offerings, Burial 8 has been identified as a Late Classic elite status burial.

Burial 10 consists of a collapsed vaulted tomb found under Structure 76. Various chert and obsidian chippings were associated with the tomb, a feature common to many elite burials across the Petén region. The chamber of the tomb measured 1.2 by 3.6 metres (3.9 by 11.8 ft) by 1 metre (3.3 ft) high. The bones of the deceased were well preserved in spite of being fragmented by the collapse of the ceiling. The remains were probably that of an adult male and the body was laid out on its back with the head towards the east. The burial was accompanied by only two offerings consisting of a ceramic bowl and a plate, the style of which date it to the Late Classic sometime between AD 600 and 830.
