= Tan Teʼ Kʼinich =

- Ajaw

King of Aguateca
- Reign: c.770-after 802
- Predecessor: Uchaʼan Kʼan Bʼalam
- Born: 22 January 748
- Died: after 802
- Father: Uchaʼan Kʼan Bʼalam
- Mother: wife of Uchaʼan Kʼan Bʼalam
- Religion: Maya religion

Tan Teʼ Kʼinich was a Maya king of the ancient city of Aguateca, in the Petén Department of modern Guatemala.

== Biography ==
He was born on January 22, 748. His father was the king Uchaʼan Kʼan Bʼalam.

Aguateca Stela 19 records a battle that he fought in 778 and also mentions his father.

In 802 Tan Teʼ Kʼinich presided over a ceremony performed by Lachan Kʼawiil Ajaw Bot at La Amelia.
