= Tamarindito =

Archaeological site in Guatemala

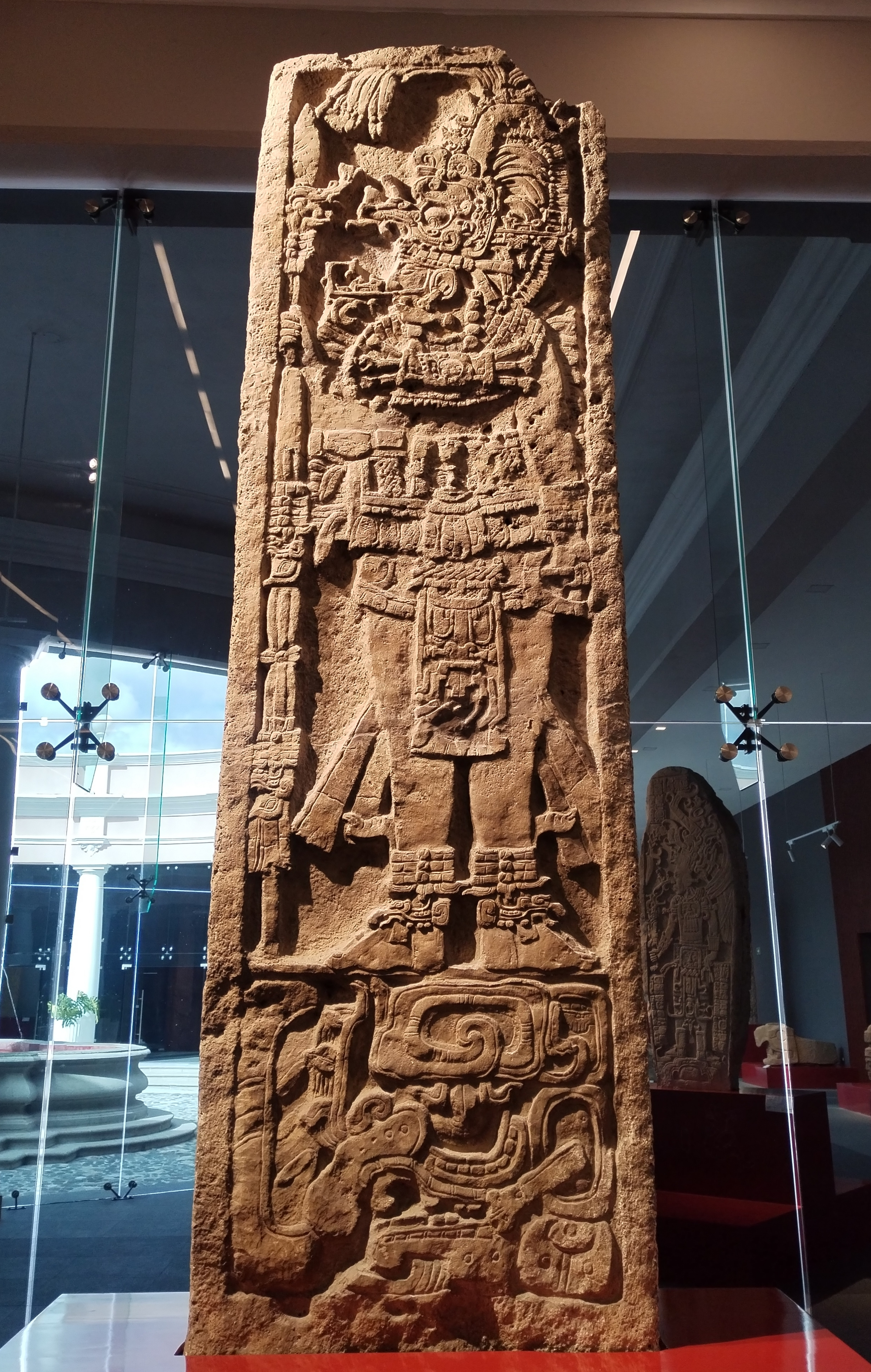
- Stela 3 of Tamarindito

- Location within Guatemala
- 16°27′0″N 90°13′48″W
- Periods: Classic
- Cultures: Maya
- Location: Sayaxché
- Region: Petén Department, Guatemala

History
- Abandoned: 9th century AD
- Event(s): Conquered by: Dos Pilas

Site notes
- Architectural style: Classic Maya
- Excavation dates: 1990–1994, 2009–
- Archaeologists: Stephen D. Houston, Oswaldo Chinchilla, Juan Antonio Valdés, Markus Eberl Petexbatun Regional Archaeological Project

Tamarindito is an archaeological site of the Maya civilization located along an escarpment in the Petén department of Guatemala. The city was the capital of the Petexbatún region of the southwestern Petén during the Early Classic period but was displaced by the newly founded conquest state of Dos Pilas. In the 8th century Tamarindito turned on its new overlord and defeated it. After the destruction of the Dos Pilas kingdom the region descended into chaos and suffered rapid population decline. The city was all but abandoned by the 9th century AD.

Tamarindito was the third largest city in the Petexbatún region. The site was one of the earliest cities established in the area of the Pasion River, together with Altar de Sacrificios and Tres Islas. Tamarindito was also the first site in the Petexbatún region to gain the right to use its own Emblem Glyph.

Archaeologists have excavated a Late Classic royal tomb from beneath one of the temples at the site, although the burial had been damaged by the collapse of the vaulted ceiling it still contained one of the richest funerary offerings in the entire Petexbatún region.

== Location ==
Tamarindito is situated on the highest of a series of hills forming an escarpment in the Petexbatún region of the Petén department of northern Guatemala. The hills run westward to Arroyo de Piedra and south to El Escarbado. The highest point of the hill, known as Cerro de Cartografía ("Cartography Hill") has a wide view across the local area as far as the Pasión River and the sites of Punta de Chimino and Itzan.

The site is located above three small lakes and two springs, with the lakes bordering the site to the east, northeast and north. These lakes are named Laguna Tamarindito, Laguna El Raicero and Laguna Las Pozas respectively. Tamarindito is located 10 kilometres (6.2 mi) east of the ruins of the Late Classic city of Dos Pilas, its bitter rival. Tamarindito's secondary capital, Arroyo de Piedra, was located to the west of Tamarindito. Tamarindito is 6 kilometres (3.7 mi) northwest of Lake Petexbatún and is north of Aguateca.

== History ==
Core samples from the nearby Lake Tamarindito indicate that the Petexbatún region was first settled between 2000 and 1000 BC, in the Middle Preclassic.

Tamarindito was a small centre in the Early Classic, even after it underwent a significant increase in population at that time. The Early Classic dynasty at Tamarindito claimed that its royal lineage extended back into the Preclassic. By the 7th century AD Tamarindito was the capital of the Petexbatún region, with a secondary capital at Arroyo de Piedra, but it was displaced when the great city of Tikal established of a new centre at Dos Pilas in order to exert control over the important Pasión River trade route. In the Late Classic Tamarindito experienced a notable growth in population and the city reached its maximum population in the 8th century AD, together with the neighbouring sites of Dos Pilas and Aguateca. King Chanal Balam was enthroned in 760 and on 26 January 761 Tamarindito defeated the city of Dos Pilas, and Chanal Balam either captured K'awiil Chan K'inich, the last king of Dos Pilas, or sent him into exile. This rebellion of Tamarindito and its allies against Dos Pilas left the defeated city all but abandoned and destabilised the entire Petexbatún region, sending it into a spiral of escalating hostilities. Within 50 years of the victory over Dos Pilas the population of Tamarindito had collapsed by almost eighty percent and it is possible that some of the inhabitants moved to Punta de Chimino which had a large Terminal Classic occupation. A ruler from Tamarindito is mentioned at Aguateca in an inscription dating to 790 but at this late time the relationship between the two sites is unclear.

By the Terminal Classic the Petexbatún had been swept by endemic warfare and all the major cities were in ruins. What had begun as struggles for dominance of the Petexbatún degenerated into intense internecine warfare and the situation in the region at the end of the 8th century has been described as a "landscape of fear" with many sites becoming fortified. Population levels at Tamarindito fell and many residential groups were abandoned, with occupation only continuing at a minority of investigated groups to the east of the site core. By the 9th century Tamarindito was reduced to a small hamlet containing a few households located near the springs. This might represent a reoccupation of the site after the period of warfare had passed and the region had become more peaceful after the drastic population reduction of the 8th century.

=== Modern History ===
The site was declared a National Prehispanic Monument by Accord 1210 of the Guatemalan Ministry of Education (MINEDUC) on 12 June 1970. The site was looted during the 1970s, either by local farmers or by locals from Sayaxché. In 1982 several looters were caught in the act of looting Structure 44 in Group B and were imprisoned for a short time. Looters' trenches have mostly been sunk into the summits of the site's pyramids and many parts of the hieroglyphic stairway were removed to private collections in Guatemala City. By the 1990s looting had been much reduced by the nearby presence of several guerrilla detachments during the later stages of the Guatemalan Civil War.

Tamarindito was first mapped in 1984 by Ian Graham, Merle Greene and Stephen D. Houston, who also uncovered some monuments at the site, including Hieroglyphic Stairway 3. The Petexbatún Regional Archaeological Project started investigations at Tamarindito in 1990, carrying out mapping and test excavations under the direction of Stephen D. Houston and Oswaldo Chinchilla. Investigations continued from 1991–1994 under the direction of Juan Antonio Valdés, excavating the site's palaces.

== Known rulers ==
Currently, twelve rulers can be identified, but only a few accounts are recorded that refer to their accession. These are indicated in the list, all other dates are anchored by other events attested. If some gaps between kings are closed because of relative proximity, some were surely direct successors. All dates A.D.

Name	Ruled
Ruler 1	ca. 513
Wakoh K'inich	ca. 534 – ca. 554
Ruler 3	ca. 573
Ruler 4	– 613
Wakoh Chan K'inich	a. 613 –
Aj Ajan Nah	ca. 660
Aj Ihk' Wolok	ca. 660 – ca. 702
Ruler 8	ca. 705
Ruler 9	– ca. 711
Ruler 10	– 712
Chak Bin Ahk	a. 712 – ca. 731
Chanal Balam	a. 760 – ca. 764

The texts at Tamarindito indicate a long dynastic history, Aj Ihk' Wolok (Ruler 7) claims to be the 25th ruler in succession, but the count is anchored to a fictional dynastic founder. This implies that the later rulers of Tamarindito considered their royal patriline to have begun many years earlier, in the deep mythical past.

== The site ==
In the Preclassic period, villages immediately below the Tamarindito escarpment exhausted their agricultural resources and the focus of settlement in the area shifted onto the escarpment itself. Tamarindito was located strategically on the highest part of the range of hills and in the Early Classic it emerged as the most important city in the region. Tamarindito had a secondary capital at the nearby center of Arroyo de Piedra, and both formed one polity, sharing the same emblem glyph.

Tamarindito is thought to have been the capital of a ruling lineage in the Early Classic Petexbatún, it got subjugated in the Late Classic by the new kingdom that had established itself at Dos Pilas. On a stela from Arroyo de Piedra, we can see ruler Chak Bin Ahk designated as a lord subordinate to Dos Pilas. The rivalry between Dos Pilas and Tamarindito may not only have been about regional hegemony, but Tamarindito had close ties to Tikal, the adversary of Dos Pilas, during the Middle Classic. Tamarindito is a moderate sized site with more than 140 structures, six stelae, seven panels, two altars, a ballcourt for the Mesoamerican ballgame and three hieroglyphic staircases; one named the "Prisoner Staircase" that relates the defeat and capture of a ruler of Dos Pilas. This polity had strong links with Machaquilá to the east. The lagoon has been the object of archaeological investigations that have shown traces of occupation from the Middle Preclassic through to the Terminal Classic.

Although Tamarindito was located very close to the hostile Dos Pilas kingdom, it never possessed purpose-built defensive fortifications. The area between Tamarindito and Aguateca includes some of the most agriculturally fertile soils in the Petexbatún region and was intensively cultivated as evidenced by the remains of low boundary walls. The site also features sunken gardens, box terraces, and dams dated to the Late to Terminal Classic that formed part of an intensive agricultural system within the site core. Investigations have revealed that Tamarindito was the most productive agricultural centre in the Petexbatún region. It may have provided much of its agricultural production as tribute to Dos Pilas in the late 7th to early 8th centuries, since Dos Pilas itself had no agricultural production to speak of. The site is divided into two main groups, named as Group A and Group B. Both groups contained sculpture, including 3 stelae (2 inscribed and 1 plain), 3 hieroglyphic steps and two carved panels. The palace structures in Groups A and B appear to serve different functions, with those in Group A serving as elite residences and those in Group B appearing to serve administrative and diplomatic uses. The earlier construction phases of some palaces at Tamarindito exhibit different architectural styles and superior construction techniques to palaces at Dos Pilas in the 7th–8th centuries AD. The hillsides to the east of the site core were densely occupied with residential structures.

Tamarindito exhibits some differences from other archaeological sites in the Petexbatún region, such as the lack of defensive walls, the presence of small groups of residential structures clustered around small central courtyards and the long sacbe causeway approaching the ceremonial core of the city. The majority of the structures at Tamarindito only survive as platforms although some still exhibit other architectural features such as stairways and walls.

Stela 5 depicts an Early Classic king holding a stone knife similar to the obsidian knife found in the tomb of king Chan Balam.

=== Group A ===
Group A is also known as the Cerro de Cartografía Group, it is located at 203 metres (666 ft) above mean sea level. It includes a pyramid, range structures, and various mound groups and terraces, the major period of occupation at Group A dates to the Late Classic. The group mainly consists of residential structures and includes several palaces, only two or three of which had vaulted stone roofs, the rest of them were likely to have been roofed with palm. Group A began in the Early Classic with very few structures but underwent a major expansion in the Late Classic, with the construction including formal stone palaces with corbel-vaulted roofs and covered in painted stucco.

Structure 1 is a temple on the south side of the group. Sculptured monuments associated with the structure have been dated to the Early Classic period.

Structure 5 (also known as Palace 5) is the highest palace structure at Tamarindito. The palace's interior measured 20 by 2 metres (65.6 by 6.6 ft) and it had a vaulted roof. The interior contained only one or possibly two simple rooms without benches. The structure faced north and a single doorway has been uncovered in that side, although it is possible that a second doorway also existed in the north side. Unusually this meant that the building faced away from Group A's Main Plaza. A wide stairway climbed the structure from the Plaza but it was necessary to walk around to the other side of the structure to gain access. The facade of Structure 5 overlooks Structure 7 immediately to the north. Investigations of the palace have discovered an earlier substructure 2 metres (6.6 ft) below a second stucco floor. Structure 5 may be the oldest structure in Group A.

Structure 7 (also known as Palace 7) is a palace structure opposite Structure 5, immediately to the north of it. This structure has been dated to the Late Classic. The palace faces south towards Structure 5. It has a single room measuring 8 by 2 metres (26.2 by 6.6 ft) that was originally vaulted and was accessed via a main door in the centre of the south wall. There was a smaller doorway in the east wall but this was blocked off in antiquity. The room possessed two stone benches, one of which was against the north wall, opposite the door, while the other was at the west end of the room. The exterior walls of the structure was coated in red and orange stucco, whilst the interior had a red stucco covering. The structure has been damage by 2 looters' trenches sunk into the summit in the 1980s, these have partially destroyed the west side of the building. Works to stabilise the remains were carried out in the 1990s.

Structure 13 (also known as Palace 13) is located in the northern part of Group A. Archaeologists uncovered three construction phases with the later two dating to the Late Classic and the earliest dated to the Early Classic. The oldest remains found consist of a 1-metre (3.3 ft) high wall with a stucco floor at its base. The whole west side of this Early Classic substructure was destroyed when the next phase of the building was erected in the Late Classic. This consisted of a 1.5-metre (4.9 ft) high platform facing east onto a small plaza and reached by a low stairway. The plaza was surfaced with stucco. The last construction phase replaced the previous 3-step stairway with a higher 6-step stairway. Opposite the stairway was a bench with a niche.

Burial 2 was excavated in Group A. The remains were those of a female and have been dated to the Late Classic.

Burial 3 was also excavated in Group A. The majority of the bones are missing but the remains are those of an adult accompanied by an offering of two ceramic pieces that date the burial to the beginning of the Late Classic.

=== Group B ===
The other group is on a neighbouring hilltop to the southwest and consists of a plaza bordered by several temples and a palace complex. A sacbe (causeway) runs northwards from the plaza to a group of large temples and south to a group of mounds. Group B is the larger of the two principal groups and it appears to have been the seat of the ruling elite, with more formal architecture than Group A, including ritual, administrative and residential structures.

The Southeast Plaza was the residential area of the governing elite and was not connected to the sacbe.

Structure 31, together with neighbouring Structures 32 and 33, forms a small plaza beside the North Plaza.

Structure 32 is an administrative structure located in the North Plaza.

Structure 33 is another administrative structure in the North Plaza.

Structure 44 is a pyramid located on the west side of the Central Plaza. It is 10 metres (33 ft) high, making it one of the tallest structures at Tamarindito. The upper part of the structure has been badly damaged by looters. Hieroglyphic Stairway 2 forms the first five steps of this structure, the rest of the steps are less wide and contain no sculpted text. The entire stairway rises 8 metres (26 ft) up the east side of the structure to the summit shrine, which possessed three east-facing doorways. Each of these doorways measured just under 2 metres (6.6 ft) wide and opened onto a single room measuring 10 by 3 metres (32.8 by 9.8 ft). The walls of the shrine were thick and were fashioned from finely worked stone. The tomb of king Chan Balam was found under the temple.

Structure 61 is notable for a chultun (a man-made subterranean storage chamber) that was found carved from the limestone bedrock under the central axis of its stairway. The chaltun was empty and had been carefully sealed prior to the abandonment of the site and it is believed that it had been created in order to receive a burial but was never used.

Group B contains the 3 hieroglyphic stairways found at the site, which contain texts that describe the dynastic history of the site.

Hieroglyphic Stairway 2 described the capture of king K'awiil Chan K'inich of Dos Pilas and the victory of Tamarindito and Arroyo de Piedra over that city in 761. It formed first five steps of the stairway of Structure 44.

Hieroglyphic Stairway 3 was discovered in 1984 during investigations by Ian Graham, Merle Greene and Stephen D. Houston. It has since been removed by the Instituto de Antropología e Historia. The surviving text included the site's emblem glyph and the ahau title, used for a ruling lord.

==== Royal tomb ====
The salvage excavation of a looters' tunnel in Structure 44, a poorly constructed 8th-century temple, revealed that the loose rubble infill of the temple had collapsed the tunnel before it reached a royal tomb, which was left intact. The tomb was excavated by Juan Antonio Valdés and was discovered to be that of king Chanal Balam, the ruler who overthrew Dos Pilas in AD 761. The funerary temple containing the tomb possesses inscriptions celebrating Chanal Balam's great victory over his former overlord.

The tomb was 10 metres (33 ft) under the temple and the vaulted ceiling had collapsed. The bones of the king were found laid out on his back with his head oriented to the north. The remains were poorly preserved, having been badly damaged by the collapse of the tomb's ceiling. The king's body was placed upon a fine layer of obsidian chippings. At the end of the burial rites several layers of flint and obsidian chippings were scattered around the tomb, more than 460 kilograms (1,010 lb) of chippings were found of each although flint was more common than obsidian. Rich offerings were found beside the skull, in the only part of the tomb were the vaulting had not collapsed. The offering included nine ceramic vessels including four polychrome vessels, three earthenware bowls and a tripod plate. The border of the tripod plate and its supports bear the Ik emblem glyph of the Motul de San José polity and one of the polychrome vessels has a painted scene of courtly life depicting a king of the same site. These pieces do not mention the king of Tamarindito and are believed to have been gifts from Motul de San José. A stingray spine was found by the king's pelvis, an obsidian knife was at his waist and a large 50-centimetre (20 in) long flint knife had been placed on his chest, similar to a knife depicted on a sculpture at Chichen Itza where it is used to decapitate a human sacrifice. A spondylus shell had been placed by the king's head, together with jade earspools and the jade beads of a necklace. As of 1995 this was the richest offering found with any elite burial in the Petexbatún region.

=== Minor groups ===
There are a number of lesser groups of buildings at Tamarindito, largely to the east of the site core. Twelve residential complexes have been mapped on the hillsides to the east of the site core. These include Groups Q5-1 through to Q5-5, R5-1, Q6-1 through to Q6-3, Groups R6-1 and R6-2, and Group R7-1. The most common layout of these groups is that of four buildings completely enclosing a central courtyard. These twelve groups contain 56 structures over an area of approximately 1,450 square metres (15,600 sq ft).

Group Q4-1 has been investigated by archaeologists, they recovered ceramic remains dating to the Terminal Classic. Unusually for such a late date, Group Q4-1 is located low down on the hillside near agricultural terracing and one of the water sources.

Group Q5-1 consists of four buildings around a central courtyard. A pyramid rises on the west side of this courtyard and is the highest structure in the group. The group has been dated to the Late Classic but ceramic remains from this period were found mixed with Early Classic ceramic remains in the structural infill. Seven high status burials were found distributed within three of the structures, they were all dated to the Late Classic.

Group Q5-2 features a large block of cut limestone that may have functioned as the base for a stela. The group is also notable for a small cave underneath the principal structure. Near the cave entrance was found a large shell that had been cut in half lengthwise in order to serve as a scribe's inkwell, as illustrated in Maya art. Because of this inkwell, the excavators have interpreted this group as the residence of a scribe. The group has been dated to the Late Classic.

Group Q5-3 has been dated to the Late Classic.

Group Q5-4 has also been dated to the Late Classic.

Group Q6-1 is laid out in a similar manner to Group Q5-1, with a pyramid on the west side of the courtyard. The group has been dated to the Late Classic. Ceramic remains dating to the Early Classic period were recovered from a looters' trench sunk into this western structure and apparently was associated with an Early Classic substructure under the Late Classic pyramid. Occupation at Group Q6-1 continued into the Terminal Classic, as evidenced by ceramic remains.

Group Q6-2 consists of structures laid out around three sides of a courtyard, with the fourth side left open. The group is located fairly close to Group A. Occupation at the group was fairly high status and was limited to the Late Classic. The architecture was built from well-cut stones, the buildings had rooms with benches and stucco floors. The group appears to have been the residence of artisans producing luxury and ritual stone items for the elite. Large quantities of stone waste together with flint hammers were found on top of the low southern platform, Structure Q6-9, which had on this evidence been identified as a stone workshop. Burial 4 in the Structure Q6-8 on the west side of the group contained a large amount of waste stone chippings. The ritual involved in depositing stone upon the burial was common among the elite in the Petexbatún region but Burial 4 is the only known burial where this rite was performed in a non-elite setting in the whole region. Excavators recovered a whole eccentric flint in a rubbish deposit to the north of Structure Q6-8.

Group R6-1 is similar to Groups Q5-1 and Q6-1, except that the higher pyramid structure is on the south side of the courtyard. The basal platform of the complex is built of dolomitic limestone blocks. A circular altar rests at the base of the pyramid and a small structure occupies the centre of the courtyard, an unusual feature that is not often found in the Maya lowlands although other examples have been identified at Tikal and Uaxactun. This group has been dated to the Late Classic.

Group R6-2 consists of structures enclosing three sides of a courtyard, with the fourth side left open.

=== Terraces ===
The site features a large number of agricultural terraces that are currently covered by secondary scrub, making their mapping difficult. Some of these terraces follow the contours of the hillside for up to 210 metres (690 ft) and are marked by rows of stones. There is also a series of terraces set into a hollow between two hilltops formed by small dykes built from rows of large stones.
