= El Rosario National Park =

National park in Petén, Guatemala

- Interactive map of El Rosario National Park
- Location: Petén, Guatemala
- Coordinates: 16°31′38″N 90°09′36″W
- Area: 11.05 km^{2} (4.27 sq mi)
- Elevation: 150 m (490 ft)
- Established: Acuerdo Gubernativo 10-10-80
- Visitors: allowed
- Operator: INAB

El Rosario National Park (Spanish pronunciation: [el roˈsaɾjo]) is located in El Petén, Guatemala, on the eastern edge of the town of Sayaxché. (16.527163°N 90.160017°W). The park is named after laguna El Rosario, a small lake within its boundaries, and was formerly a state owned finca managed by the National Forestry Institute (INAB). In 1980 it was declared a national park. The park covers an area of 11.05 km^{2}, including the El Rosario lake, which has a surface area of 4 ha in the dry season, though it is considerably larger during the rainy season.
