= Lachan Kʼawiil Ajaw Bot =

- Ajaw
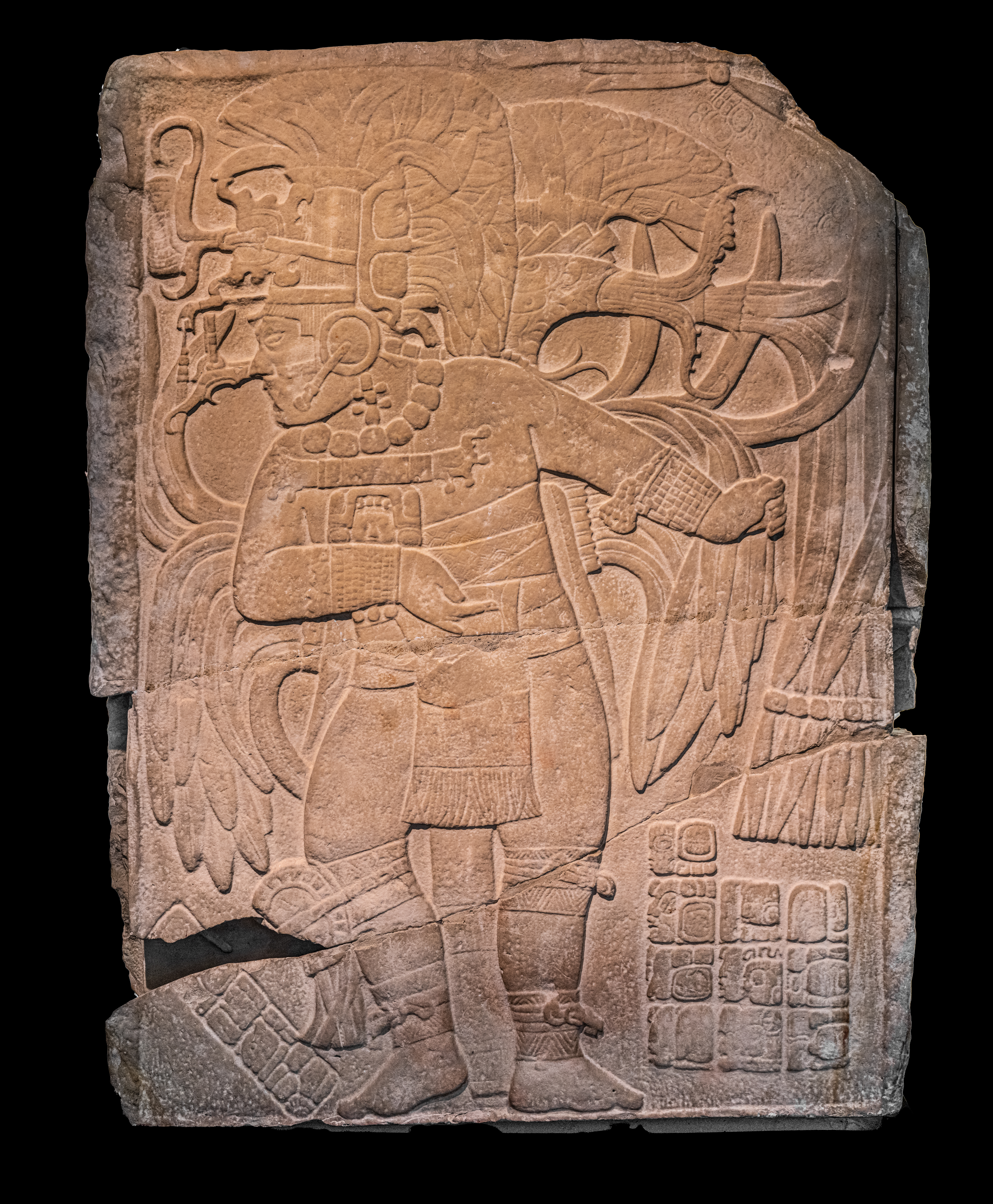
- Stela 1 of La Amelia, which depicts the king dancing.

King of La Amelia
- Reign: 1 May 802 - after 804
- Born: 25 June 760
- Died: after 804
- Religion: Maya religion

Lachan Kʼawiil Ajaw Bot (25 June 760 - ?) was a Maya king of La Amelia, an ancient city near Itzan in the Petén Department of modern Guatemala. La Amelia was abandoned some time in the middle of the 9th century AD.

He is mentioned on Panel 1 and Hieroglyphic Stairway 1 at the site. He was enthroned on 1 May 802.

In 802 king Tan Teʼ Kʼinich supervised a ritual conducted by the Lachan Kʼawiil Ajaw Bot.

Panel 2 records a date of AD 804 and depicts Lachan Kʼawiil Ajaw Bot dressed as a ballplayer.
