= Sayaxché =

- Municipality of Guatemala
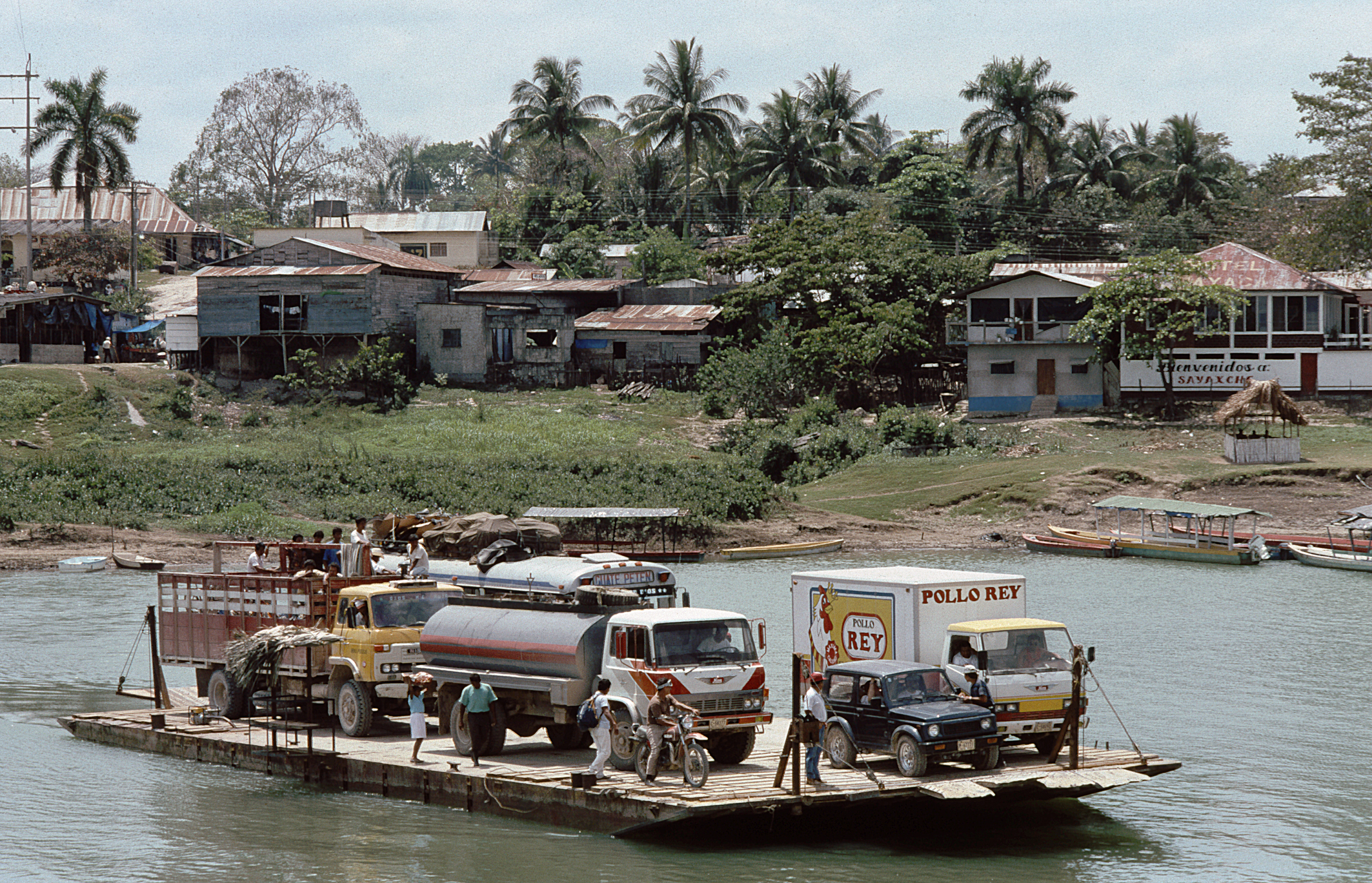
- Ferry across Río de la Pasión in Sayaxché

- Location within Guatemala
- Coordinates: 16°31′N 90°11′W
- Country: Guatemala
- Department: El Petén
- Found: 1874

Area
  - Total: 3,904 km^{2} (1,507 sq mi)
- Elevation: 125 m (410 ft)

Population (2012)
  - Total: 114,781
- Climate: Am
- Website: Official website

Sayaxché (Spanish pronunciation: [saʝaʃˈtʃe]) is a municipality in the El Petén department of Guatemala, on the Río La Pasión River. It covers an area of 3,904 square kilometres or 1,507 square miles, and had 55,578 inhabitants at the 2002 Census; the latest official estimate (as at mid-2012) was 114,781 inhabitants.

The city was founded in 1874 to provide accommodation for forest workers of Jamet Sastré logging company. It obtained municipal status in 1929.

El Rosario National Park is located just east of the town. The archaeological sites of Ceibal and Dos Pilas are located within the municipal boundaries.

== Climate ==
Sayaxché has a tropical monsoon climate (Köppen: Am).

Climate data for Sayaxché
Month	Jan	Feb	Mar	Apr	May	Jun	Jul	Aug	Sep	Oct	Nov	Dec	Year
Mean daily maximum °C (°F)	26.7 (80.1)	28.0 (82.4)	29.7 (85.5)	31.5 (88.7)	32.4 (90.3)	31.7 (89.1)	30.1 (86.2)	30.5 (86.9)	30.2 (86.4)	29.1 (84.4)	27.9 (82.2)	26.7 (80.1)	29.5 (85.2)
Daily mean °C (°F)	22.4 (72.3)	23.1 (73.6)	24.9 (76.8)	26.6 (79.9)	27.7 (81.9)	27.2 (81.0)	26.0 (78.8)	26.2 (79.2)	26.0 (78.8)	25.1 (77.2)	23.8 (74.8)	22.3 (72.1)	25.1 (77.2)
Mean daily minimum °C (°F)	18.2 (64.8)	18.2 (64.8)	20.2 (68.4)	21.7 (71.1)	23.0 (73.4)	22.8 (73.0)	22.0 (71.6)	22.0 (71.6)	21.9 (71.4)	21.1 (70.0)	19.7 (67.5)	17.9 (64.2)	20.7 (69.3)
Average rainfall mm (inches)	86 (3.4)	62 (2.4)	42 (1.7)	45 (1.8)	160 (6.3)	236 (9.3)	216 (8.5)	215 (8.5)	268 (10.6)	251 (9.9)	144 (5.7)	115 (4.5)	1,840 (72.6)
Source: Climate-Data.org

== African oil palm ==
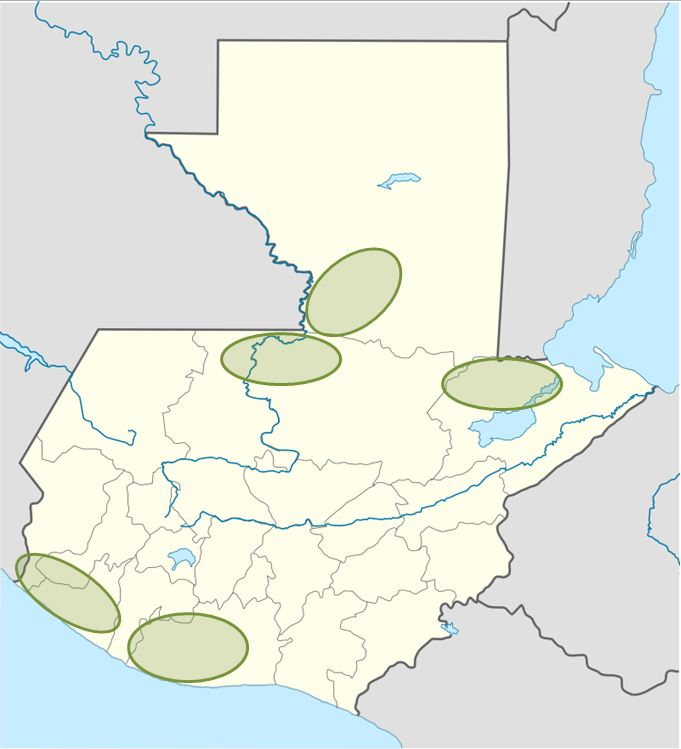
African oil palm plantation areas in Guatemala as of 2014.

There is a large demand within Guatemala and some of its neighbors for edible oils and fats, which would explain how the African oil palm became so prevalent in the country in detriment of other oils, and which has allowed new companies associated to large capitalists into a new investment phase that can be found particularly over some territories within the Northern Transversal Strip of Guatemala. The investors are trying to turn Guatemala into one of the main palm oil exporters, in spite of the decline on its international price. The most active region is found in Chisec and Cobán, in Alta Verapaz Department; Ixcán in Quiché Department, and Sayaxché, Petén Department, where Palmas del Ixcán, S.A. (PALIX) is located, both with its own plantation and those of subcontractors. Another active region is that of Fray Bartolomé de las Casas and Chahal in Alta Verapaz Department; El Estor and Livingston, Izabal Department; and San Luis, Petén, where Naturaceites operates.

== Archeological sites ==
Sayaxché has thirty two archeological locations; among the most visited are: El Ceibal, Dos Pilas and El Duende, Aguateca, and Cancuén.

Site	Description
El Ceibal	Approximately at 22 km from Sayaxché Vlla. It was restored between 1963 and 1968 by Harvard University scholars.
Dos Pilas	Approximately at 28 km southwest of Sayaxché Villa. It has two crystalline creeks and Mayan sculptures in excellent condition.
Aguateca	In the same area as Dos Pilas, it is characterized by a well defined geological fault.
Cancuén	This site has gained notoriety because of the discovery of several monumental structures. It is located at the border of La Pasión River and close to Chisec, in Alta Verapaz Department.

== Tourism ==
Sayaxché is at the tourism center of Petén Department. The closest tourist attractions to the municipality are:

Site	Description
Petexbatún	This is a large lagoon, with crystalline water and virgin jungle. It is an appropriate place of fishing, water sports, hunting and animal studies.
San Juan Acul	Only 14 km from Sayaxché by land or 16 km by boat, San Juan Acul is a small lagoon practically unexplored.
Arroyo El Pucte	Located at 36 km by boat across the La Pasión River, its crystalline waters allow one to see its bottom.
Salinas River	It is the natural border between Mexico and Guatemala and has long shores with fine and brilliant sand.
El Rosario National Park	Located 4 km away from Sayaxché villa, has forests and a small lake in the middle. It is controlled by the National Forestry Institute and has 10.79 km².

== Ecological disaster ==
On June 6, 2015, residents around Río La Pasión River reported the finding of a high count of dead fish floating along the river.

On June 11, 2015, Guatemala's authorities inspected palm oil extracting company "Reforestadora de Palmas de Petén, S.A." (REPSA), located in Sayaxché, and found traces Malathion in the company's tributaries leading to Río La Pasión river.

Tranquilino Xojalaj, administrator of REPSA declared that heavy rain caused the treatment wells to flood into the river, however the company is denying any involvement in the disaster, stating that they do not use Malathion as pesticide.

As of June 15, 2015, contamination has extended to over 105 km downstream and is affecting over 5,600 families (around 30,000 residents) from 16 communities by the riverside. These communities are dependable on the river's water supply and also for their fishing activities.

The pollution is threatening to extend to the Usumacinta River, which travels all the way to Mexico, and may continue its way towards rivers in Tabasco.

== Geographic location ==
The municipality has a surface of 3,908 square kilometres or 1,509 square miles, which corresponds to the 10.89% of Petén Department.

== See also ==
- African oil palm
- Franja Transversal del Norte
- Malation
- Pasión River
- Usumacinta River

== Notes and references ==
=== Bibliography ===
- Rodríguez, Gladys Verónica (2008). Administración del riesgo. Municipio de Sayaxché, departamento de Petén (PDF) (in Spanish). Guatemala: Facultad de Ciencias Económicas de la Universidad de San Carlos de Guatemala. Archived from the original (PDF) on 17 June 2012.
- Solano, Luis (15 July 2015). "Palma Africana" (PDF). Revista Enfoque (in Spanish) (36). Guatemala. Archived from the original (PDF) on 20 July 2015.
