= Petexbatún Lake =

Lake in Sayaxché, Petén Department, Guatemala

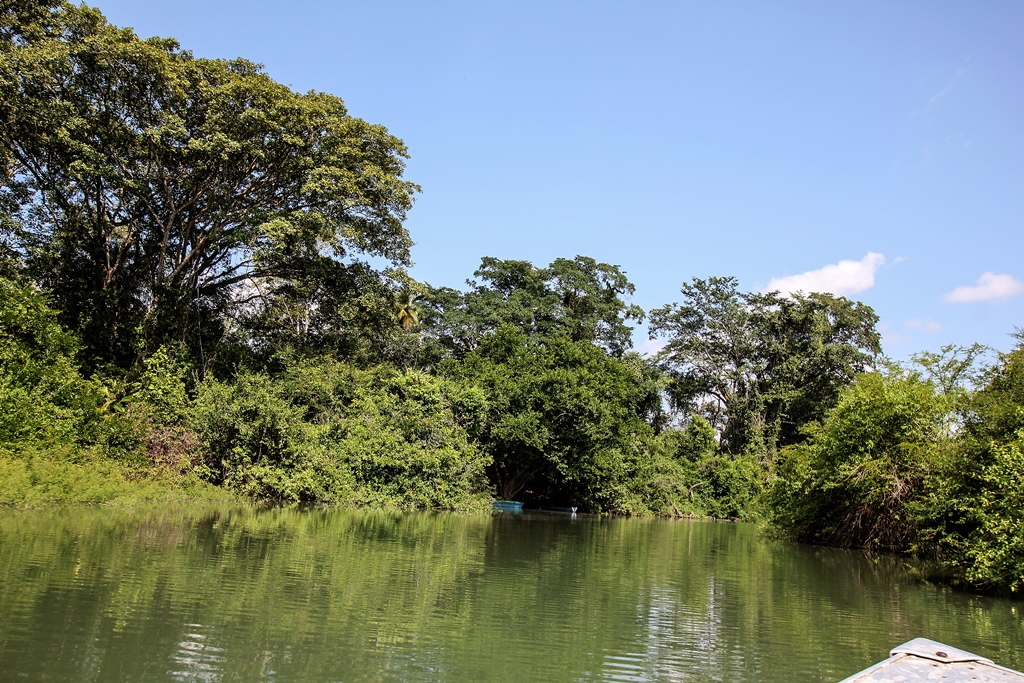
- Petexbatún river near the site of Aguateca

- Location within Guatemala
- Location: Petén
- Coordinates: 16.432381°N 90.187283°W
- Primary inflows: Riachuelo Aguateca, Riachuelo El Faisán
- Primary outflows: Río Petexbatún
- Basin countries: Guatemala
- Surface area: 5.4 km^{2} (2.1 sq mi)
- Surface elevation: 130 m (430 ft)

Petexbatún is a small lake formed by a river of the same name, which is a tributary of the Pasión River. It is near Sayaxché, located in the southern area of the Guatemalan department of Petén.

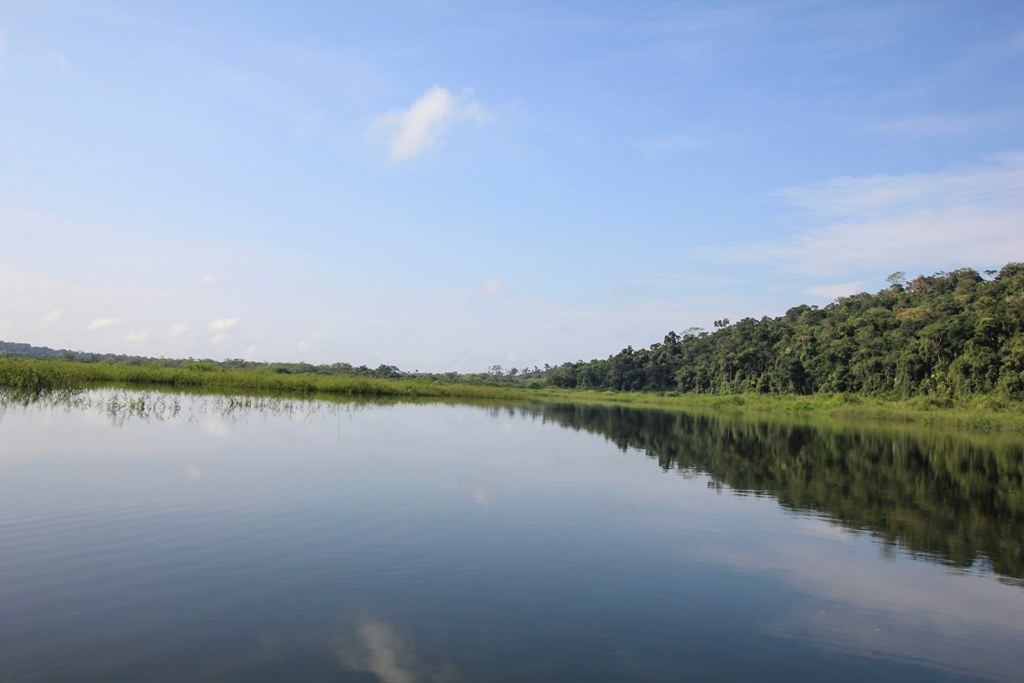
Petexbatún Lake

In winter, as the La Pasión River rises, the direction of the Petexbatún River is reversed. It moves south with the current of the La Pasión River and the water level of the Petexbatún Lake increases.

Archaeologists gave the name of Petexbatún State to a group of cities during the Classic period of the Maya civilization that include Seibal, Itzan, Dos Pilas, Aguateca, Tamarindito, Punta de Chimino, Nacimiento, and others. This State was the first to be abandoned in the Late Classic, when the Maya collapse occurred in a south to north pattern, although Seibal, may have been reoccupied by a foreign group, possibly the Putún Maya, according to the style of the stele in this period. The archaeological findings here have given a lot of information about the collapse of the Classic Maya civilization.
