= Aguateca =

Mayan archaeological site

Coordinates: 16°23′41.92″N 90°12′15.49″W

- Location within Guatemala
- Region: Petén Department, Guatemala

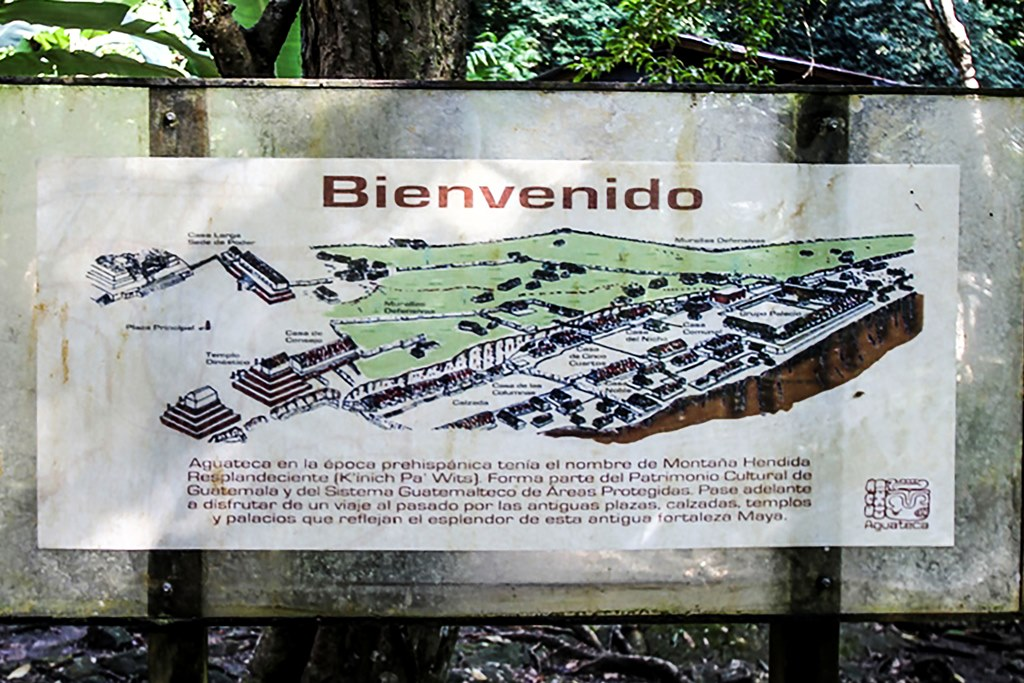
Plan of Aguateca viewing to the north. The site of Aguateca is built in between the Main Chasm on the west and the steep escarpments on the east

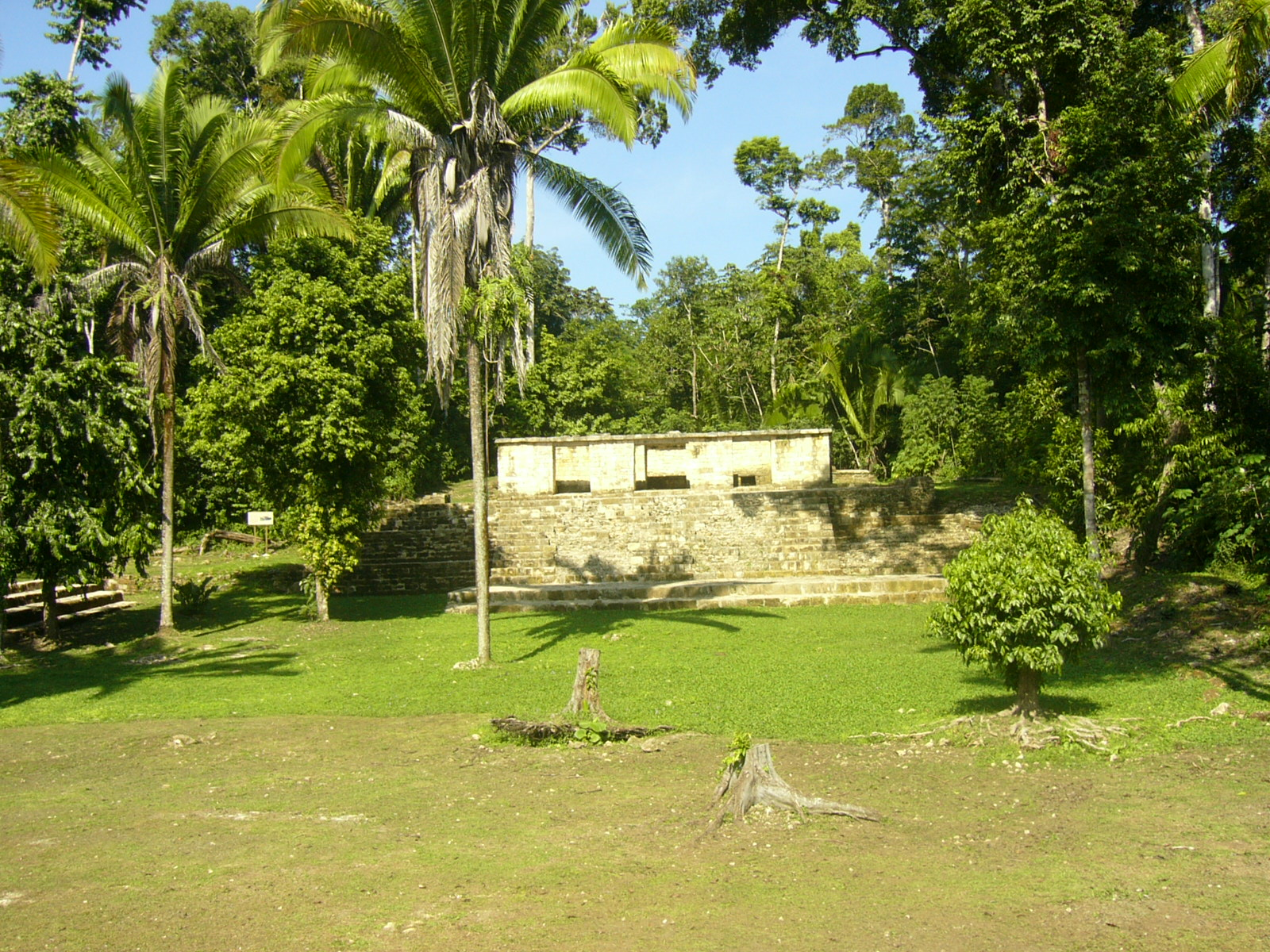
Palacio Real

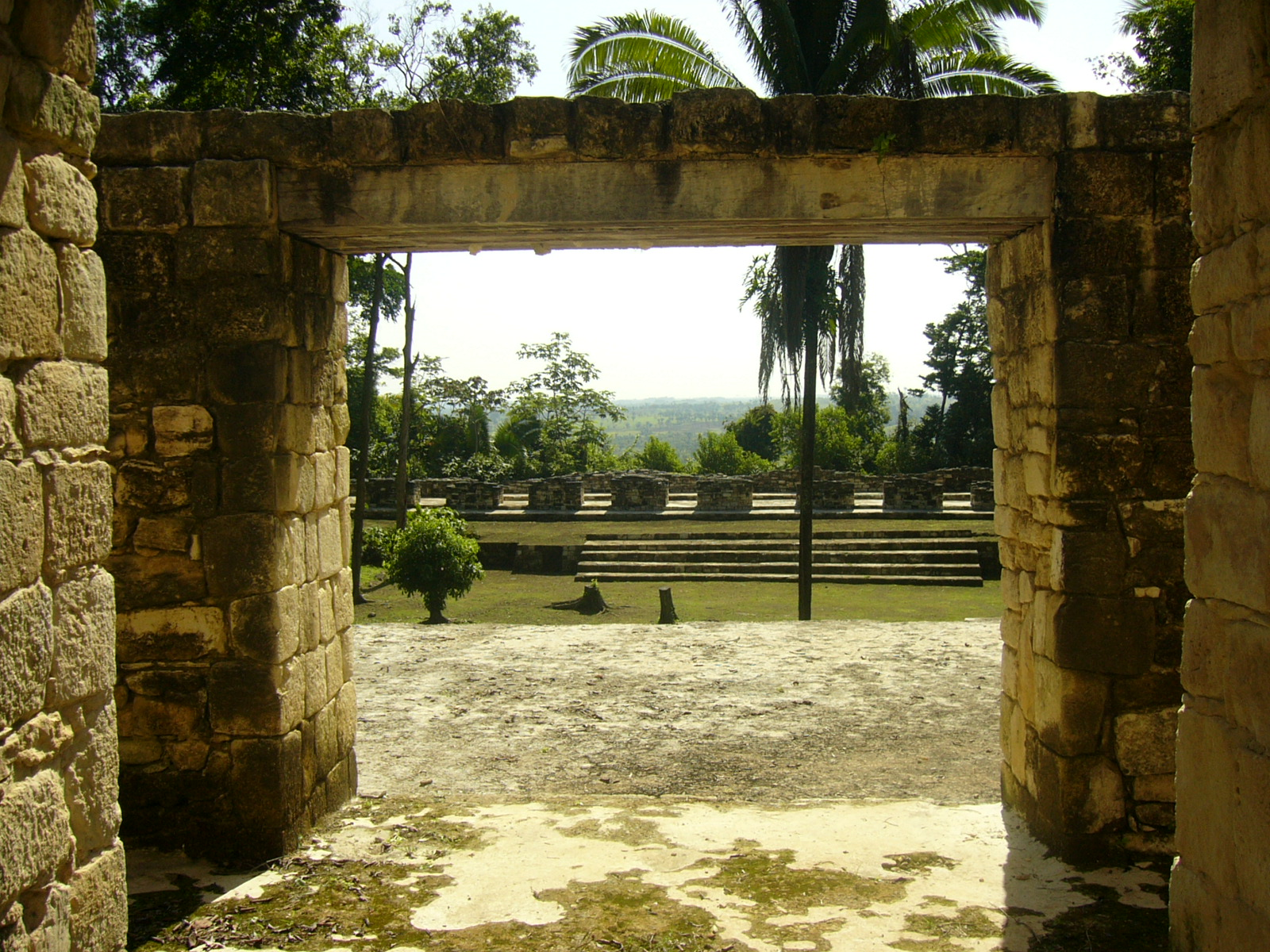
View from Palacio in Plaza 2 de Aguateca

Aguateca is a Maya site located in northern Guatemala's Petexbatun Basin, in the department of Petén. The first settlements at Aguateca date to the Late Preclassic period (300 BC - AD 350). The center was occupied from about 200 B.C. until about 800 A.D., when the city was attacked and ransacked. Because the city was rapidly abandoned by its population, Pompeii-style assemblages were left scattered on the floors of elite residences. Horizontal excavation of these residences has revealed ancient elite activity and household level craft production areas. Aguateca sits on top of a 90 metres (300 ft) tall limestone bluff, creating a highly defensible position. This steep escarpment overlooks Petexbatun Lagoon in the Southwestern Guatemalan lowlands and is accessible by boat. There is an extensive system of defensive walls that surrounds the city, reaching over 3 miles (4.8 km) in length. Its center consisted of the Palace Group, which was probably a royal residential compound, and the Main Plaza. These monumental complexes were connected by a causeway, along which was a densely occupied elite residential area. During the reign of Tan Te' K'inich the city was invaded and burned. The city was completely abandoned around 830 AD. A 6-metre (20 ft) tall temple at the site was left unfinished, the centre of the city was destroyed by fire, valuables were left scattered in elite residences, and ceramics were left in their original domestic positions, all of which demonstrate the sudden abandonment of the city. The ruins of Aguateca are considered to be among the best preserved in Guatemala.

== Early development ==
Aguateca and the nearby city of Dos Pilas were the twin capitals of a powerful dynasty claiming descent from the rulers of Tikal. Around 700 AD, it appears that Dos Pilas Rulers 3 and 4 were responsible for shifting the focus of the dynasty from Dos Pilas to Aguateca, as can be determined from stelas and monuments. In 761 AD, the rulers of Dos Pilas appear to have abandoned their city and relocated to Aguateca. Aguateca became a large, densely populated city, with a higher density of structures than most other lowland Maya sites. It is possible that the population of Aguateca migrated from the Pasion region, but it is likely there was a large population from other regions as well. The influx of people was probably a result of the political influence of the dynasty. The development of a new center requires a substantial labor force to construct temples, palaces, and causeways. For the royal family and elites securing a controllable population was essential.

== Structures and society ==
The structural complexes of this ancient Mayan site have provided archaeologists with invaluable information about the societal composition at Aguateca. This includes the significance and role of different social classes, their placement in society, and their daily routines. In addition to this, households, as the most basic socioeconomic units, interacted dynamically with larger social, economic, and political institutions. The examination of these aspects at Aguateca is critical for understanding various aspects of human societies and behavior.

== Elite households and lifestyle ==
In most traditional societies, like Aguateca, what we call private and public merge inseparably, in contrast to modern societies, in which the division between "home" and "work" is relatively common. Houses in the elite residential area of Aguateca commonly consist of three main rooms and smaller additions. These included numerous domestic objects including serving vessels, grinding stones, and a variety of stone tools. Obsidian blades, probably used for bloodletting, were also found, as well as stone mortars for pigment reparation. The central rooms appear to have served as locations to receive visitors, perform scribe work, and store ritual objects as well as food. The presence of mano and metate in one of the main rooms of these complexes also indicates that food preparation took place here. In addition, excavators found seven bone needles and seven spindle whorls in one of the rooms. This suggests that textile production occurred in or in front of this room, most likely a task undertaken by women. The residents of an elite structure clearly conducted a wide range of mundane activities, including the storage, preparation, and consumption of food. As noted, these residences were also spaces for political gatherings and artistic production. A male resident may have used the central room for meetings and one of the side rooms for scribal and artistic work, whereas the other room was most likely associated with the female. Each residence was multi-purposeful, and there have been no structures found that were solely dedicated to food storage within the elite residential groups or the royal palace. This indicates that food storage was not centralized or controlled. Because of this, differences in food storage capacity and food processing may reflect differences in household size or even differences in economic status and access to sources. An elite Maya man could have conducted various activities, such as stone knapping, carving wood, shell, or bone, as well as administrative, diplomatic, and ritual duties in and outside the residence. An elite Maya woman may have engaged in different kinds of artistic creation and craft production, in addition to other domestic activities. Classic elite men and women possessed multiple social identities and roles.

== Main plaza and performance ==
The Classic Maya strongly emphasized the theatrical performance and visibility of rulers. The large plaza at Aguateca, like other Classic Maya centers, was designed to accommodate a large number of individuals. These plazas held the majority of the community members on ceremonial occasions. Residents made a significant effort to secure spaces for mass spectacles by creating plazas outside of core areas and constructing large causeways. Prominent representations of rulers on stone monuments were also placed in plazas. Theatrical events probably held together a Maya community around the ruler and royal court. The presence of plazas of varying sizes suggests that theatrical events also divided the community, separating those who were allowed to participate in exclusive performance from the less privileged.

== Palace group and the royal family ==
The overall site layout, architectural configurations, storage of objects, and post-abandonment treatment all point to the unique qualities of the Palace Group as the royal palace complex. These buildings also served administrative functions with the central rooms used as settings for royal audience and other political meetings. The configuration of this royal palace complex suggests that the ruler maintained a certain level of visibility. For example, meetings held in one of the Palace Group structures were visible to those who were not allowed in. The prominence of meeting scenes in Maya ceramic paintings suggests that certain gatherings in royal palaces were meant to be witnessed. It appears that before the final attack on Aguateca took place, the royal family cleaned out the rooms of the palace and left the center.

== Temple construction and commoners ==
One structure that has been discovered has been identified as an unfinished temple. It is believed that it was still in the process of construction when it was attacked and abandoned at the beginning of the 9th century. Its discovery has provided valuable information on Maya building methods and processes, as well as the likelihood for specialization. It is possible that construction labour was organized into different groups, such as workers carrying rocks to the site, stone cutters quarrying blocks for dressed stone, masons or plaster workers setting stones with mortar, and stone sculptors carving monuments. All of these people worked side by side, and elite architects or supervisors most likely coordinated the tasks of various workers.

== Material culture ==
=== Elite artisans ===
A significant portion of Maya elites, both men and women, engaged in artistic creation and craft production at Aguateca, and they were often involved in independent and attached production. Artistic and craft production appears to have been a common pursuit among classic Maya elites at Aguateca, including courtiers of the highest rank and even members of the royal family. They manufactured not only luxury goods and weaponry but also utilitarian items for consumption both within and outside the household. Items produced included wood carvings and hide or leather goods. Because of this, several kinds of craft production overlapped in various households. At the same time, particular households and individuals emphasized specific artistic creation and craft activities. One household might carve stelae for the ruler, while another might have an emphasis on shell and bone objects of high symbolic value. It is likely that elite women actively participated in these types of production, engaging in stone carving in collaboration with noble men. Artistic creation, as well as the garnering of ideological, religious, and esoteric production knowledge, were important in exclusionary tactics and elite identity. Some of these elite art pieces were found burned after the abandonment of Aguateca, with pieces representing what archaeologists call "The Jester God" being found in one of the elite residences, signifying the importance of art creation among the elite.

=== Obsidian ===
Obsidian was a highly valued material in Classic Maya society, and possession of it was indicative of high status. The rulers of Aguateca controlled the main access to obsidian in the city while the procurement and distribution of obsidian may have been administered by the royal court of the Aguateca dynasty as part of its political economy. Both the rulers of Aguateca and the elite scribes/artists had a larger number of stronger and more substantial obsidian crafted blades than those who lived in smaller residences. The presence of obsidian also indicates that the Classic Maya at Aguateca were not isolated from other regions but participated in long distance trade to obtain the material.

=== Animals ===
Production of goods from animal products for the community and rulers seems to have been common. All members of the community were involved in animal related craft production, but some aspects of this crafting were only carried out in specific households. Activities included meat/hide production and initial bone-tool production. Some animals were used as luxury goods and foods, access to which was differentially available on the basis of social rank or authority. The upper class had greater access to animal sources that were considered to be more ritual or exotic. Such species included marine shells (for decoration) and wild cats such as jaguars, margays, and ocelots (used for pelts, teeth, and claws). Non-exotic animals were also differentially available as foods and tools. Dominant species for consumption at Aguateca include white-tailed deer, river turtles, dog, agouti, paca, peccaries, as well as large birds and riverine fish.

=== Theatre ===
The Main Plaza of Aguateca contained numerous stone monuments and provided an adequate environment for theatrical performances. Theatrical performances not only communicate pre-existing ideas but also define political reality as it is experienced by participants. Theatrical events constitute a critical process of integration and conflict and have particularly significant effects on the maintenance and transformation of societies. The performances of rulers, which is depicted on stone monuments, involved a large audience. This makes the Main Plaza at Aguateca highly significant because its use as a theatrical space was a primary concern in the design of the city. These events gave physical reality to the community and counteracted the tendencies of non-elite populations to move away from the center of the city. The elite may have taken advantage of these performances to advance their political agendas, but they were at the same time under constant evaluation by viewers. Theatrical events set the stage for creation and imposition of power relations and associated ideologies, as well as resistance to and subversion of them.

=== Tools ===
In order to be able to produce the goods and materials that they did, the community of Aguateca had to create the tools they used for production. Some of these tools included manos and metates, tools utilized for grinding, with manos typically being used for the preparation of corn, and metates being used to grind other materials down into smaller quantities. Some animal products were also used as tools, such as the bones of deer assisted in the manufacturing of lithic tools and burnishing. The people of Aguateca were able to create these tools that they used to create many other of the artifacts found at the archaeological site, and provide answers as to how the production of materials and goods was organized and carried out in their society.

== Main Chasm rituals ==
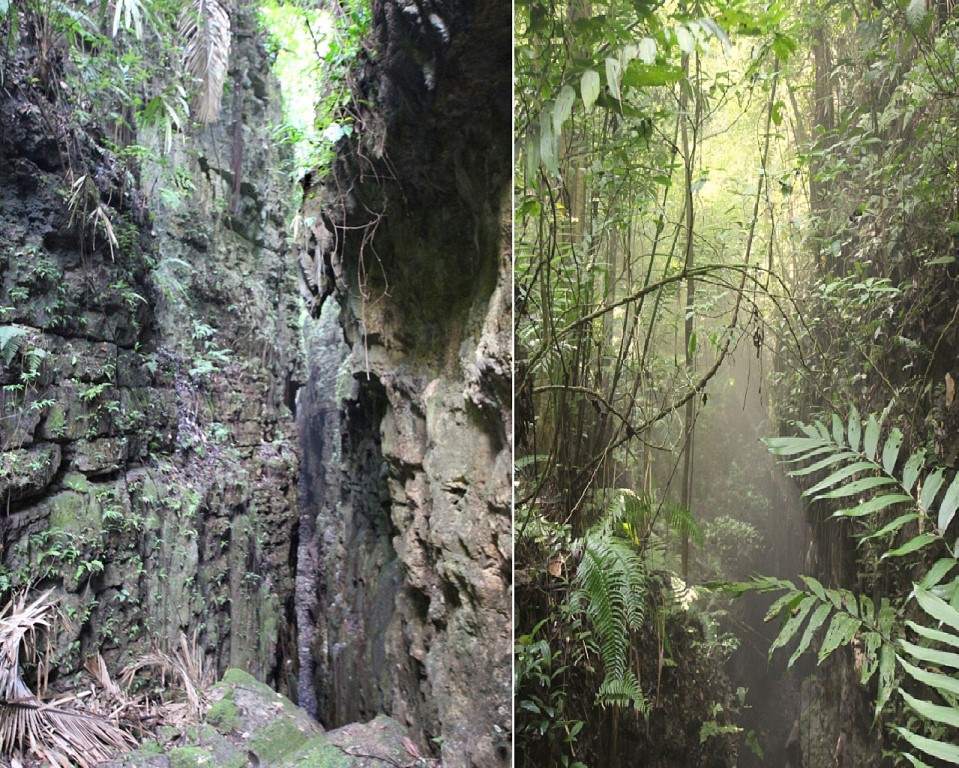
Two views into the long steep slope of the Main Chasm

The Main Chasm is a naturally formed deep fracture of limestone karst running NE-SW through the middle of the Aguateca site. It measures approximately 850 m long, 10–70 m deep and 1,5 – 15 m wide. Embodying the maya conception of mountain-cave, it has strong evidence of a variety of ritual practices. This suggests that chasms, like caves, represent potent cosmological and religious places where ancestral and supernatural spirits can be reached. The features and natural phenomena observed at the Main Chasm at Aguateca provide a window into the complex manipulation of the transformative properties of the elements and their significance. At Aguateca, within the interiors of the earth where the wind blows clouds onto the hill from the depths of the chasm, wind instruments were played and fires were burned. It is possible these fires contained copal incense which would have formed black smoke reminiscent of rain clouds, with the hopes of bringing rain. Notably, two of the elements air (wind) and water (rain), are intricately linked according to Maya beliefs. Water, as an enduring element of life, was materialized in the form of rain ceremonies, layered with meanings that ranged from sufficient rainfall to dynastic prosperity and power. The toponymic glyph of Aguateca represents the chasm.

== Farming ==
The subsistence environment at Aguateca, like at other Classic Maya sites, was limited by shallow, sloped soils and unpredictable weather patterns until their collapse. Based on changes in stable carbon isotope ratios of soil, we are able to determine the ancient presence of C4 plant growth and maize. The ancient Maya of Aguateca probably adapted to their environment by exploiting ideal areas for agriculture. As a result, it is likely that maize was grown in the seasonal wetlands adjacent to the site. Natural "rejollada" karst features, "toeslip" soils, and seasonally inundated wetlands were important soil resources to the ancient Maya because the soils there were deep and fertile. Stepped slopes of the rejolladas may have acted as natural terraces. This was also probably the site of frequent maize cultivation and may have been politically important.

== War and weapons ==
Both the royal family and elite scribes/artists at Aguateca used spear and dart points for "inter-group human conflict" as well as for artistic and craft production under enemy threat. The ruler and elite were also warriors, and owning these weapons and participating in warfare established and perpetuated their supremacy. Spear and dart points were more important than the bow and arrow, but notches in these points do indicate that the bow and arrow was in use. Inter-valley conflict may have been a crucial factor that lead to the development of Classic Maya complex societies such as Aguateca. This warfare had a fundamental effect on society, and is what ultimately led to the demise of Aguateca.

== Destruction and abandonment ==
Although inter-group conflict, climate changes, and environmental degradation began to cause social upheaval towards the end of the reign of Aguateca, the ultimate destruction of the center was a result of warfare. Around 800 A.D. Aguateca appears to have been attacked by enemies. A series of defensive walls that were hastily constructed towards the end of the Late Classic period were probably in response to the escalation of warfare in the region. The elite residential area near the royal palace was burned, and residents fled or were taken away, leaving most of their belongings behind. The attacking army did not stay in the center, and soon the entire city was abandoned. Elaborately built structures, such as the Palace Group, contained highly valuable goods, such as greenstone beads, carved alabaster, and shell ornamentation. This further supports the conclusion that the city was abandoned rapidly. Excavations at the Palace Group suggest that the royal family evacuated the center before the attack and anticipated to return, but it appears that members of the elite remained. Areas outside the center were abandoned gradually, probably right after the destruction of the city. The inhabitants of these areas carried away most of their belongings to their next residences. Because of the pattern of destruction and abandonment, it is likely that the ruling elite of Aguateca was the primary focus of battle. The enemies aimed to terminate Aguateca as a political and economic power and they succeeded. The drastic fall of Aguateca is very similar to the situation in Pompeii, which provides us with a wealth of evidence today. Moments of classic Maya lives were frozen in the rich assemblages of objects left in burned structures. This provides information regarding domestic activities, household organization, and political interactions of the Classic Maya at Aguateca.

Comprehensive spatial and structural excavations across the Petexbatún region have defined the core defensive features, monumental public spaces, and rapidly abandoned elite residences at Aguateca:

Architectural, Defensive, and Household Features of Aguateca
Sector / Structure	Architectural & Natural Features	Associated Material Culture & Function	Archaeological Context of Abandonment
Main Chasm (Grieta Principal)	Natural karst fissure (850 m long, 10–70 m deep) running NE-SW through the site core.	Copal incense burners, wind instruments, rain ritual offerings; functions as the site's primary toponym.	Sacred landscape feature symbolizing the mountain-cave concept; continuous ritual utilization until final site siege.
Defensive Wall Network	Concentric palisade-and-stone walls spanning over 4.8 km; hastily built in the Late Classic.	Defensive barricades blocking causeways and plaza access points; modified urban circulation.	Erected during the escalation of regional warfare in the Petexbatún Basin prior to the 800 AD attack.
Palace Group & Palace D	Elevated masonry complex with central reception halls and administrative chambers.	In situ obsidian blades, scribe instruments, bone needles, spindle whorls, and burned Jester God ornaments.	Rapid evacuation by the royal family; elite residences systematically burned with rich domestic assemblages intact.
Unfinished Temple (Structure M8-4)	6-meter-tall stepped pyramid left incomplete with raw construction materials.	Quarried stone blocks, mortar preparation areas, and discarded stone-cutting tools.	Direct evidence of sudden disruption; construction halted abruptly due to the final enemy assault.

== See also ==
- List of Mesoamerican pyramids

== Bibliography ==
1. Emery, Kitty F.; Aoyama, Kazuo (2007). "Bone, shell, and lithic evidence for crafting in elite Maya households at Aguateca, Guatemala". Ancient Mesoamerica. 18 (1): 69–89. doi:10.1017/S0956536107000089. JSTOR 26309322. S2CID 163044977. ProQuest 196680392.
2. Inomata, Takeshi; Triadan, Daniela; Ponciano, Erick; Pinto, Estela; Terry, Richard E.; Eberl, Markus (2002). "Domestic and Political Lives of Classic Maya Elites: The Excavation of Rapidly Abandoned Structures at Aguateca, Guatemala". Latin American Antiquity. 13 (3): 305–330. doi:10.2307/972113. JSTOR 972113. S2CID 155520148. Gale A92448195.
3. Martin & Grube 2000, p. 65
4. Miller (1999), p. 35.
5. Culbert, T. Patrick (1991). Classic Maya Political History: Hieroglyphic and Archaeological Evidence. Cambridge University Press. ISBN 978-0-521-39210-5.
6. Lohse, Jon C.; Valdez, Fred (2010). Ancient Maya Commoners. University of Texas Press. ISBN 978-0-292-77814-6.
7. Marcus, Joyce (1976). Emblem and State in the Classic Maya Lowlands: An Epigraphic Approach to Territorial Organization. Dumbarton Oaks. ISBN 978-0-88402-066-0.
8. Nielsen, Axel E., and William H. Walker. Warfare in Cultural Context: Practice, Agency, and the Archaeology of Violence. Tucson: University of Arizona, 2009. Print.
9. Inomata, Takeshi; Triadan, Daniela; Ponciano, Erick; Pinto, Estela; Terry, Richard E.; Eberl, Markus (2002). "Domestic and Political Lives of Classic Maya Elites: The Excavation of Rapidly Abandoned Structures at Aguateca, Guatemala". Latin American Antiquity. 13 (3): 305–330. doi:10.2307/972113. JSTOR 972113. S2CID 155520148. Gale A92448195.
10. Triadan, Daniela (2000). "Elite Household Subsistence at Aguateca, Guatemala". Mayab (13): 46–56.
11. Aoyama, Kazuo (2007). "Elite Artists and Craft Producers in Classic Maya Society: Lithic Evidence from Aguateca, Guatemala". Latin American Antiquity. 18 (1): 3–26. doi:10.2307/25063083. JSTOR 25063083. S2CID 161149243. Gale A162184238.
12. Inomata, Takeshi (2006). "Plazas, Performers, and Spectators: Political Theaters of the Classic Maya". Current Anthropology. 47 (5): 805–842. doi:10.1086/506279. JSTOR 10.1086/506279. S2CID 150054455.
13. Inomata, Takeshi; Triadan, Daniela; Ponciano, Erick; Terry, Richard; Beaubien, Harriet F. (January 2001). "In the Palace of the Fallen king: The Royal Residential Complex at Aguateca, Guatemala". Journal of Field Archaeology. 28 (3–4): 287–306. doi:10.1179/jfa.2001.28.3-4.287. JSTOR 3181436. S2CID 162187707.
14. Inomata, Takeshi; Ponciano, Erick; Chinchilla, Oswaldo; Román, Otto; Breuil-Martínez, Véronique; Santos, Oscar (December 2004). "An unfinished temple at the Classic Maya centre of Aguateca, Guatemala". Antiquity. 78 (302): 798–811. doi:10.1017/S0003598X00113456. S2CID 163577976. Gale A127538851.
15. Aoyama, Kazuo (1 June 2006). "Political and socioeconomic implications of Classic Maya lithic artifacts from the Main Plaza of Aguateca, Guatemala". Journal de la société des américanistes. 92 (1–2): 7–40. doi:10.4000/jsa.3078. JSTOR 24606344.
16. Emery, Kitty (January 2003). "The noble beast: status and differential access to animals in the Maya world". World Archaeology. 34 (3): 498–515. doi:10.1080/0043824021000026477. JSTOR 3560200. S2CID 143828798.
17. Ishihara 2009, p. 1.
18. Ishihara 2009, p. 367.
19. Ishihara, Reiko (June 2008). "Rising clouds, blowing winds: Late Classic Maya rain rituals in the Main Chasm, Aguateca, Guatemala". World Archaeology. 40 (2): 169–189. doi:10.1080/00438240802030001. JSTOR 40388205. S2CID 154536421.
20. Ishihara2009, p. 2.
21. Johnson, Kristofer D.; Wright, David R.; Terry, Richard E. (March 2007). "Application of carbon isotope analysis to ancient maize agriculture in the Petexbatún region of Guatemala". Geoarchaeology. 22 (3): 313–336. doi:10.1002/gea.20155. S2CID 129265248.
22. Aoyama, Kazuo (2005). "Classic Maya Warfare and Weapons; Spear, Dart, and Arrow Points of Aguateca and Copan". Ancient Mesoamerica. 16 (2): 291–304. doi:10.1017/S0956536105050248. JSTOR 26309185. S2CID 162394344. ProQuest 196684099.
23. Inomata, Takeshi; Webb, Ronald W. (2003). "War, destruction, and abandonment: The fall of the Classic Maya center of Aguateca, Guatemala". The Archaeology of Settlement Abandonment in Middle America. University of Utah Press. pp. 43–60. ISBN 978-0-87480-752-3.
24. Wright, Lori E. (2006). Diet, Health, and Status Among the Pasión Maya: A Reappraisal of the Collapse. Vanderbilt University Press. ISBN 978-0-8265-1418-9.
25. Sharer & Traxler 2006, p. 409.
26. Triadan, Daniela; Inomata, Takeshi (2014). Life and Politics at the Royal Court of Aguateca: Artifacts, Analytical Data, and Synthesis. University of Utah Press. ISBN 978-1-60781-319-4. Project MUSE book 41408.
27. Inomata, Takeshi (March 2013). "9 Negotiation of Inalienability and Meanings at the Classic Maya Center of Aguateca, Guatemala". Archaeological Papers of the American Anthropological Association. 23 (1): 128–141. doi:10.1111/apaa.12020.
