= January 18 =

January 18 this year in various calendars
- Sunday, 18 January 2026
Akan	Nwonakwasi
Armenian	2 Mehekani 1475
Aztec	Toxcatl 8, 9 Cōzcacuāuhtli
Babylonian	28 Kislimu, 2336 SE
Balinese pawukon	Luang, Pepet, Beteng, Menala, Keliwon, Aryang, Redite of Medangkungan, Yama, Ogan, Duka
Bengali	4 Magh, BS 1432
Chinese	Yang Water Dragon・Emptiness Mansion; Wood Snake Year, Month 11, Day 30 (Xiaohan, 2 days until Dahan)
Common Era	18 January 2026 CE
Coptic	10 Tobi, AM 1742
Egyptian	7 Payni, 2774 NE
Ethiopian	10 Ṭer, 2018 Amätä Məhrät
French Republican	Décade III, Nonidi de Nivôse de l'Année 234 de la République
Gregorian	18 January, AD 2026
Hebrew	29 Tevet, AM 5786
Hindu	Pūrvāṣāḍha・Harṣaṇa; Solar: 5 Māgha, 1947 SE; Lunisolar: Amāvasyā, Kṛishna pakṣa of Pauṣa, 2082 VE; Siddhārthin・5126 KY・1,872,593
Icelandic	Sunnudagur, 26 Mörsugur 2025
Islamic	29 Rajab, AH 1447 (using tabular method)
ISO week date	2026-W03-7
Japanese	30 Shimotsuki, Reiwa 8 (Shōkan, 2 days until Daikan)
Julian	5 January, AD 2026 (AM 7534)
Julian day	2461059
Korean	30 Jwidal, 4358 DE
Maya	13.0.13.4.16; 14 Muan, 9 Cib
Roman	Nonis Ianuariis, MMDCCLXXIX AUC
Solar Hijri	28 Dey, SH 1404
Tibetan	30 mgo, shing mo sbrul 2152 or 1771 or 999

<<	January					>>
Su	Mo	Tu	We	Th	Fr	Sa
				1	2	3
4	5	6	7	8	9	10
11	12	13	14	15	16	17
18	19	20	21	22	23	24
25	26	27	28	29	30	31
2026

January 18 in recent years
2026 (Sunday)
2025 (Saturday)
2024 (Thursday)
2023 (Wednesday)
2022 (Tuesday)
2021 (Monday)
2020 (Saturday)
2019 (Friday)
2018 (Thursday)
2017 (Wednesday)

January 18 is the 18th day of the year in the Gregorian calendar; 347 days remain until the end of the year (348 in leap years).

== Events ==
=== Pre-1600 ===
- 350 – General Magnentius is proclaimed emperor by Roman aristocrats discontent with the rule of emperor Constans.
- 474 – Seven-year-old Leo II succeeds his maternal grandfather Leo I as Byzantine emperor. He dies ten months later.
- 532 – Nika riots in Constantinople fail.
- 1126 – Emperor Huizong abdicates the Chinese throne in favour of his son Emperor Qinzong.
- 1486 – King Henry VII of England marries Elizabeth of York, daughter of Edward IV, uniting the House of Lancaster and the House of York.
- 1562 – Pope Pius IV reopens the Council of Trent for its third and final session.
- 1586 – The magnitude 7.9 Tenshō earthquake strikes Honshu, Japan, killing 8,000 people and triggering a tsunami.

=== 1601–1900 ===
- 1670 – Henry Morgan captures Panama.
- 1701 – Frederick I crowns himself King in Prussia in Königsberg.
- 1778 – James Cook is the first known European to discover the Hawaiian Islands, which he names the "Sandwich Islands".
- 1788 – The first elements of the First Fleet carrying 736 convicts from Great Britain to Australia arrive at Botany Bay.
- 1806 – Jan Willem Janssens surrenders the Dutch Cape Colony to the British.
- 1866 – Wesley College is established in Melbourne, Australia.
- 1871 – Wilhelm I of Germany is proclaimed Kaiser Wilhelm in the Hall of Mirrors of the Palace of Versailles (France) towards the end of the Franco-Prussian War. Wilhelm already had the title of German Emperor since the constitution of 1 January 1871, but he had hesitated to accept the title.
- 1886 – Modern field hockey is born with the formation of The Hockey Association in England.
- 1896 – An X-ray generating machine is exhibited for the first time by H. L. Smith.
- 1898 – British colonial engineer and estate manager William Claxton Peppé discovered the Buddha's remains in Piprahwa, Uttar Pradesh, India.

=== 1901–present ===
- 1911 – Eugene B. Ely lands on the deck of the USS Pennsylvania anchored in San Francisco Bay, the first time an aircraft landed on a ship.
- 1913 – First Balkan War: A Greek flotilla defeats the Ottoman Navy in the Naval Battle of Lemnos, securing the islands of the Northern Aegean Sea for Greece.
- 1915 – Japan issues the "Twenty-One Demands" to the Republic of China in a bid to increase its power in East Asia.
- 1919 – World War I: The Paris Peace Conference opens in Versailles, France.
- 1919 – Ignacy Jan Paderewski becomes Prime Minister of the newly independent Poland.
- 1932 – Alt Llobregat insurrection breaks out in Central Catalonia, Spain.
- 1941 – World War II: British troops launch a general counter-offensive against Italian East Africa.
- 1943 – Warsaw Ghetto Uprising: The first uprising of Jews in the Warsaw Ghetto.
- 1945 – World War II: Liberation of Kraków, Poland by the Red Army.
- 1958 – Willie O'Ree, the first Black Canadian National Hockey League player, makes his NHL debut with the Boston Bruins.
- 1960 – Capital Airlines Flight 20 crashes into a farm in Charles City County, Virginia, killing all 50 aboard, the third fatal Capital Airlines crash in as many years.
- 1967 – Albert DeSalvo, the "Boston Strangler", is convicted of numerous crimes and is sentenced to life imprisonment.
- 1969 – United Airlines Flight 266 crashes into Santa Monica Bay killing all 32 passengers and six crew members.
- 1972 – Members of the Mukti Bahini lay down their arms to the government of the newly independent Bangladesh, a month after winning the war against the occupying Pakistan Army.
- 1974 – A Disengagement of Forces agreement is signed between the Israeli and Egyptian governments, ending conflict on the Egyptian front of the Yom Kippur War.
- 1976 – Lebanese Christian militias kill at least 1,000 in Karantina, Beirut.
- 1977 – Scientists at the Centers for Disease Control and Prevention announce they have identified a previously unknown bacterium as the cause of the mysterious Legionnaires' disease.
- 1977 – Australia's worst rail disaster occurs at Granville, Sydney, killing 83.
- 1977 – SFR Yugoslavia's Prime minister, Džemal Bijedić, his wife and six others are killed in a plane crash in Bosnia and Herzegovina.
- 1978 – The European Court of Human Rights finds the United Kingdom's government guilty of mistreating prisoners in Northern Ireland, but not guilty of torture.
- 1981 – Phil Smith and Phil Mayfield parachute off a Houston skyscraper, becoming the first two people to BASE jump from objects in all four categories: buildings, antennae, spans (bridges), and earth (cliffs).
- 1983 – The International Olympic Committee restores Jim Thorpe's Olympic medals to his family.
- 1986 – An Aerovías Sud Aviation Caravelle crashes on approach to Mundo Maya International Airport in Flores, Petén, Guatemala, killing all 94 people on board.
- 1988 – China Southwest Airlines Flight 4146 crashes near Chongqing Baishiyi Airport, killing all 98 passengers and 10 crew members.
- 1990 – Washington, D.C., Mayor Marion Barry is arrested for drug possession in an FBI sting.
- 1993 – Martin Luther King, Jr. Day is officially observed for the first time in all 50 US states.
- 2002 – The Sierra Leone Civil War is declared over.
- 2003 – A bushfire kills four people and destroys more than 500 homes in Canberra, Australia.
- 2005 – The Airbus A380, the world's largest commercial jet, is unveiled at a ceremony in Toulouse, France
- 2007 – The strongest storm in the United Kingdom in 17 years kills 14 people and Germany sees the worst storm since 1999 with 13 deaths. Cyclone Kyrill causes at least 44 deaths across 20 countries in Western Europe.
- 2008 – The Euphronios Krater is unveiled in Rome after being returned to Italy by the Metropolitan Museum of Art.
- 2012 – More than 115,000 websites engage in an online protest against the Stop Online Piracy Act and the Protect IP Act in the US. The websites involved viewed the laws as infringing on the right to free speech and many of them temporarily shut down in protest.
- 2018 – A bus catches fire on the Samara–Shymkent road in Yrgyz District, Aktobe, Kazakhstan. The fire kills 52 passengers, with three passengers and two drivers escaping.
- 2019 – An oil pipeline explosion near Tlahuelilpan, Hidalgo, Mexico, kills 137 people.
- 2023 – A helicopter crash in Ukraine leaves 14 people dead, including the country's Interior Minister, Denys Monastyrsky.
- 2025 – The popular social media app, TikTok, is banned in the United States, after the passing of PAFACA.
- 2026 – At least 45 people are killed and 292 others injured after two trains collide in Adamuz in the worst railway disaster in over a decade in Spain.

== Births ==
=== Pre-1600 ===
- 1404 – Sir Philip Courtenay, English noble (died 1463)
- 1457 – Antonio Trivulzio, seniore, Roman Catholic cardinal (died 1508)
- 1519 – Isabella Jagiellon, Queen of Hungary (died 1559)
- 1540 – Catherine, Duchess of Braganza (died 1614)

=== 1601–1900 ===
- 1641 – François-Michel le Tellier, Marquis de Louvois, French politician, Secretary of State for War (died 1691)
- 1659 – Damaris Cudworth Masham, English philosopher and theologian (died 1708)
- 1672 – Antoine Houdar de la Motte, French author (died 1731)
- 1688 – Lionel Sackville, 1st Duke of Dorset, English politician, Lord Lieutenant of Ireland (died 1765)
- 1689 – Montesquieu, French lawyer and philosopher (died 1755)
- 1701 – Johann Jakob Moser, German jurist (died 1785)
- 1734 – Caspar Friedrich Wolff, German physiologist and embryologist (died 1794)
- 1743 – Louis Claude de Saint-Martin, French mystic and philosopher (died 1803)
- 1751 – Ferdinand Kauer, Austrian pianist and composer (died 1831)
- 1752 – John Nash, English architect (died 1835)
- 1764 – Samuel Whitbread, English politician (died 1815)
- 1779 – Peter Mark Roget, English physician, lexicographer, and theologian (died 1869)
- 1782 – Daniel Webster, American lawyer and politician, 14th United States Secretary of State (died 1852)
- 1793 – Pratap Singh Bhosle, Chhatrapati of the Maratha Empire (died 1847)
- 1815 – Constantin von Tischendorf, German theologian and scholar (died 1874)
- 1835 – César Cui, Russian general, composer, and critic (died 1918)
- 1840 – Henry Austin Dobson, English poet and author (died 1921)
- 1841 – Emmanuel Chabrier, French pianist and composer (died 1894)
- 1842 – A. A. Ames, American physician and politician, Mayor of Minneapolis (died 1911)
- 1843 – Marthinus Nikolaas Ras, South African farmer, soldier, and gun-maker (died 1900)
- 1848 – Ioan Slavici, Romanian journalist and author (died 1925)
- 1849 – Edmund Barton, Australian judge and politician, 1st Prime Minister of Australia (died 1920)
- 1850 – Seth Low, American academic and politician, 92nd Mayor of New York City (died 1916)
- 1854 – Thomas A. Watson, American assistant to Alexander Graham Bell (died 1934)
- 1856 – Daniel Hale Williams, American surgeon and cardiologist (died 1931)
- 1867 – Rubén Darío, Nicaraguan poet, journalist, and diplomat (died 1916)
- 1868 – Kantarō Suzuki, Japanese admiral and politician, 42nd Prime Minister of Japan (died 1948)
- 1877 – Sam Zemurray, Russian-American businessman, founded the Cuyamel Fruit Company (died 1961)
- 1879 – Henri Giraud, French general and politician (died 1949)
- 1880 – Paul Ehrenfest, Austrian-Dutch physicist and academic (died 1933)
- 1880 – Alfredo Ildefonso Schuster, Italian cardinal (died 1954)
- 1881 – Gaston Gallimard, French publisher, founded Éditions Gallimard (died 1975)
- 1882 – A. A. Milne, English author, poet, and playwright (died 1956)
- 1886 – Clara Nordström, Swedish-German author and translator (died 1962)
- 1888 – Thomas Sopwith, English ice hockey player, sailor, and pilot (died 1989)
- 1892 – Oliver Hardy, American actor and comedian (died 1957)
- 1892 – Bill Meanix, American hurdler and coach (died 1957)
- 1892 – Paul Rostock, German surgeon and academic (died 1956)
- 1893 – Jorge Guillén, Spanish poet, critic, and academic (died 1984)
- 1894 – Toots Mondt, American wrestler and promoter (died 1976)
- 1896 – C. M. Eddy Jr., American author (died 1967)
- 1896 – Ville Ritola, Finnish-American runner (died 1982)
- 1898 – Albert Kivikas, Estonian journalist and author (died 1978)

=== 1901–present ===
- 1901 – Ivan Petrovsky, Russian mathematician and academic (died 1973)
- 1903 – Berthold Goldschmidt, German pianist and composer (died 1996)
- 1904 – Anthony Galla-Rini, American accordion player and composer (died 2006)
- 1904 – Cary Grant, English-American actor (died 1986)
- 1905 – Joseph Bonanno, Italian-American mob boss (died 2002)
- 1907 – János Ferencsik, Hungarian conductor (died 1984)
- 1908 – Jacob Bronowski, Polish-English mathematician, historian, and television host (died 1974)
- 1910 – Kenneth E. Boulding, English economist and academic (died 1993)
- 1911 – José María Arguedas, Peruvian anthropologist, author, and poet (died 1969)
- 1911 – Danny Kaye, American actor, singer, and dancer (died 1987)
- 1913 – Carroll Cloar, American artist (died 1993)
- 1913 – Giannis Papaioannou, Greek composer (died 1972)
- 1914 – Arno Schmidt, German author and translator (died 1979)
- 1914 – Vitomil Zupan, Slovene author, poet, and playwright (died 1987)
- 1915 – Syl Apps, Canadian pole vaulter, ice hockey player, and politician (died 1998)
- 1915 – Santiago Carrillo, Spanish soldier and politician (died 2012)
- 1915 – Vassilis Tsitsanis, Greek singer-songwriter and bouzouki player (died 1984)
- 1917 – Nicholas Oresko, American sergeant, Medal of Honor recipient (died 2013)
- 1917 – Wang Yung-ching, Taiwanese-American businessman (died 2008)
- 1918 – Gustave Gingras, Canadian-English physician and educator (died 1996)
- 1919 – Toni Turek, German footballer (died 1984)
- 1921 – Yoichiro Nambu, Japanese-American physicist and academic, Nobel Prize laureate (died 2015)
- 1923 – John Graham, General Officer Commanding (GOC) Wales (died 2012)
- 1923 – Gerrit Voorting, Dutch cyclist (died 2015)
- 1925 – Gilles Deleuze, French metaphysician and philosopher (died 1995)
- 1925 – John V. Evans, American soldier and politician, 27th Governor of Idaho (died 2014)
- 1925 – Sol Yurick, American soldier and author (died 2013)
- 1926 – Randolph Bromery, American geologist and academic (died 2013)
- 1927 – S. Balachander, Indian actor, singer, and veena player (died 1990)
- 1928 – Alexander Gomelsky, Soviet and Russian professional basketball coach (died 2005)
- 1930 – Esther Coopersmith, American diplomat, UNESCO goodwill ambassador (died 2024)
- 1931 – Chun Doo-hwan, South Korean general and politician, 5th President of South Korea (died 2021)
- 1932 – Robert Anton Wilson, American psychologist, author, poet, and playwright (died 2007)
- 1933 – Emeka Anyaoku, Nigerian politician, 8th Nigerian Minister of Foreign Affairs
- 1933 – David Bellamy, English botanist, author and academic (died 2019)
- 1933 – John Boorman, English director, producer, and screenwriter
- 1933 – Ray Dolby, American engineer and businessman, founded Dolby Laboratories (died 2013)
- 1933 – William Goodhart, Baron Goodhart, English lawyer and politician (died 2017)
- 1933 – Frank McMullen, New Zealand rugby player (died 2004)
- 1933 – Jean Vuarnet, French ski racer (died 2017)
- 1934 – Raymond Briggs, English author and illustrator (died 2022)
- 1935 – Eddie Jones, British illustrator (died 1999)
- 1935 – Albert Millaire, Canadian actor and director (died 2018)
- 1935 – Jon Stallworthy, English poet, critic, and academic (died 2014)
- 1935 – Gad Yaacobi, Israeli academic and diplomat, 10th Israel Ambassador to the United Nations (died 2007)
- 1936 – Tim Barlow, English actor (died 2023)
- 1936 – David Howell, Baron Howell of Guildford, English journalist and politician, Secretary of State for Transport
- 1937 – John Hume, Northern Irish educator and politician, Nobel Prize laureate (died 2020)
- 1938 – Curt Flood, American baseball player and sportscaster (died 1997)
- 1938 – Anthony Giddens, English sociologist and academic
- 1938 – Werner Olk, German footballer and manager
- 1938 – Hargus "Pig" Robbins, American musician (died 2022)
- 1940 – Pedro Rodriguez, Mexican race car driver (died 1971)
- 1941 – Denise Bombardier, Canadian journalist and author (died 2023)
- 1941 – Bobby Goldsboro, American singer-songwriter, guitarist, and producer
- 1941 – David Ruffin, American singer (died 1991)
- 1943 – Paul Freeman, English actor
- 1943 – Kay Granger, American educator and politician (died 2026)
- 1943 – Dave Greenslade, English keyboard player and composer
- 1943 – Charlie Wilson, American businessman and politician (died 2013)
- 1944 – Paul Keating, Australian economist and politician, 24th Prime Minister of Australia
- 1944 – Carl Morton, American baseball player (died 1983)
- 1944 – Kei Ogura, Japanese singer-songwriter and composer
- 1944 – Alexander Van der Bellen, President of Austria
- 1945 – Rocco Forte, English businessman and philanthropist
- 1946 – Perro Aguayo, Mexican wrestler (died 2019)
- 1946 – Joseph Deiss, Swiss economist and politician, 156th President of the Swiss Confederation
- 1946 – Henrique Rosa, Bissau-Guinean politician, President of Guinea-Bissau (died 2013)
- 1947 – Sachio Kinugasa, Japanese baseball player and journalist (died 2018)
- 1947 – Takeshi Kitano, Japanese actor and director
- 1949 – Bill Keller, American journalist
- 1949 – Philippe Starck, French interior designer
- 1950 – Gianfranco Brancatelli, Italian race car driver
- 1950 – Gilles Villeneuve, Canadian race car driver (died 1982)
- 1951 – Bram Behr, Surinamese journalist and activist (died 1982)
- 1951 – Bob Latchford, English footballer
- 1952 – Michael Behe, American biochemist, author, and academic
- 1952 – R. Stevie Moore, American singer-songwriter and guitarist
- 1953 – Brett Hudson, American singer-songwriter and producer
- 1953 – B. K. Misra, Indian neurosurgeon
- 1953 – Peter Moon, Australian comedian and actor
- 1954 – Ted DiBiase, American wrestler
- 1955 – Kevin Costner, American actor, director, and producer
- 1956 – Paul Deighton, Baron Deighton, English banker and politician
- 1960 – Mark Rylance, English actor, director, and playwright
- 1961 – Peter Beardsley, English footballer and manager
- 1961 – Bob Hansen, American basketball player and sportscaster
- 1961 – Mark Messier, Canadian ice hockey player, coach, and sportscaster
- 1961 – Jeff Yagher, American actor and sculptor
- 1962 – Alison Arngrim, Canadian-American actress
- 1963 – Maxime Bernier, Canadian lawyer and politician, 7th Minister of Foreign Affairs for Canada
- 1963 – Ian Crook, English footballer and manager
- 1963 – Carl McCoy, English singer-songwriter
- 1963 – Martin O'Malley, American soldier, lawyer, and politician, 61st Governor of Maryland
- 1964 – Brady Anderson, American baseball player
- 1964 – Richard Dunwoody, Northern Irish jockey and sportscaster
- 1964 – Virgil Hill, American boxer
- 1964 – Jane Horrocks, English actress and singer
- 1966 – Alexander Khalifman, Russian chess player and author
- 1966 – Kazufumi Miyazawa, Japanese singer
- 1966 – André Ribeiro, Brazilian race car driver (died 2021)
- 1967 – Dean Bailey, Australian footballer and coach (died 2014)
- 1967 – Iván Zamorano, Chilean footballer
- 1969 – Dave Bautista, American wrestler, mixed martial artist, and actor
- 1969 – Jesse L. Martin, American actor and singer
- 1969 – Jim O'Rourke, American guitarist and producer
- 1970 – DJ Quik, American rapper and producer
- 1970 – Peter Van Petegem, Belgian cyclist
- 1971 – Amy Barger, American astronomer
- 1971 – Jonathan Davis, American singer-songwriter
- 1971 – Christian Fittipaldi, Brazilian race car driver
- 1971 – Pep Guardiola, Spanish footballer and manager
- 1971 – Binyavanga Wainaina, Kenyan writer (died 2019)
- 1972 – Vinod Kambli, Indian cricketer, sportscaster, and actor
- 1972 – Mike Lieberthal, American baseball player
- 1972 – Kjersti Plätzer, Norwegian race walker
- 1973 – Burnie Burns, American actor, director, and producer, co-founded Rooster Teeth Productions
- 1973 – Luke Goodwin, Australian rugby league player and coach
- 1973 – Benjamin Jealous, American civic leader and activist
- 1973 – Joe Kehoskie, American baseball executive
- 1973 – Anthony Koutoufides, Australian footballer
- 1973 – Crispian Mills, English singer-songwriter, guitarist, and director
- 1973 – Rolando Schiavi, Argentinian footballer and coach
- 1974 – Christian Burns, English singer-songwriter
- 1975 – Aleksandra Woźniak, Polish actress and psychologist
- 1976 – Laurence Courtois, Belgian tennis player
- 1976 – Marcelo Gallardo, Argentinian footballer and coach
- 1976 – Damien Leith, Irish-Australian singer-songwriter and guitarist
- 1976 – Derek Richardson, American actor
- 1977 – Richard Archer, English singer-songwriter and guitarist
- 1978 – Brian Falkenborg, American baseball player
- 1978 – Thor Hushovd, Norwegian cyclist
- 1978 – Bogdan Lobonț, Romanian footballer
- 1979 – Ruslan Fedotenko, Ukrainian ice hockey player
- 1979 – Paulo Ferreira, Portuguese footballer
- 1979 – Brian Gionta, American ice hockey player
- 1979 – Kenyatta Jones, American football player (died 2018)
- 1979 – Jay Chou, a Taiwanese singer-songwriter, businessman, director, and actor
- 1979 – Wandy Rodriguez, Dominican baseball player
- 1980 – Estelle, English singer-songwriter and producer
- 1980 – Robert Green, English footballer
- 1980 – Kert Haavistu, Estonian footballer and manager
- 1980 – Julius Peppers, American football player
- 1980 – Jason Segel, American actor and screenwriter
- 1981 – Gang Dong-won, South Korean actor
- 1981 – Olivier Rochus, Belgian tennis player
- 1981 – Khari Stephenson, Jamaican footballer
- 1982 – Quinn Allman, American guitarist and producer
- 1982 – Mary Jepkosgei Keitany, Kenyan runner
- 1983 – Amir Blumenfeld, Israeli-American comedian, actor, director, and screenwriter
- 1983 – Samantha Mumba, Irish singer-songwriter and actress
- 1983 – Joel Stallworth, American sprinter
- 1984 – Seung-Hui Cho, South Korean mass murderer (died 2007)
- 1984 – Kristy Lee Cook, American singer-songwriter
- 1984 – Ioannis Drymonakos, Greek swimmer
- 1984 – Makoto Hasebe, Japanese footballer
- 1984 – Michael Kearney, American biochemist and academic
- 1984 – Benji Schwimmer, American dancer and choreographer
- 1984 – Viktoria Shklover, Estonian figure skater
- 1985 – Dale Begg-Smith, Canadian-Australian skier
- 1985 – Mark Briscoe, American wrestler
- 1985 – Riccardo Montolivo, Italian footballer
- 1985 – Hyun Woo, South Korean actor
- 1986 – Marya Roxx, Estonian-American singer-songwriter
- 1986 – Becca Tobin, American actress, singer, and dancer
- 1986 – Ikusaburo Yamazaki, Japanese actor and singer
- 1986 – Eugene Lee Yang, Korean-American actor, filmmaker, and activist
- 1987 – Johan Djourou, Swiss footballer
- 1987 – Christopher Liebig, German rugby player
- 1987 – Grigoris Makos, Greek footballer
- 1988 – Ronnie Day, American singer-songwriter
- 1988 – Angelique Kerber, German tennis player
- 1988 – Anastasios Kissas, Greek footballer
- 1988 – Ashleigh Murray, American actress and singer
- 1988 – Boy van Poppel, Dutch cyclist
- 1989 – Rubén Miño, Spanish footballer
- 1989 – Michael Pineda, Dominican baseball player
- 1990 – Gorgui Dieng, Senegalese basketball player
- 1990 – Hayle Ibrahimov, Ethiopian-Azerbaijani runner
- 1990 – Brett Lawrie, Canadian baseball player
- 1990 – Nacho, Spanish footballer
- 1990 – Gift Ngoepe, South African baseball player
- 1990 – Alex Pietrangelo, Canadian ice hockey player
- 1990 – Zeeko Zaki, Egyptian-American actor
- 1991 – Douglas Wreden, a.k.a. DougDoug, American streamer
- 1992 – Francesco Bardi, Italian footballer
- 1993 – Sean Keenan, Australian actor
- 1993 – Juan Fernando Quintero, Colombian footballer
- 1994 – Max Fried, American baseball player
- 1994 – Kang Ji-young, South Korean singer
- 1994 – Ilona Kremen, Belarusian tennis player
- 1995 – Bryce Alford, American basketball player
- 1995 – Leonard Fournette, American football player
- 1995 – Samu Castillejo, Spanish footballer
- 1996 – Sarah Gilman, American actress
- 1997 – Emil Audero, Indonesian footballer
- 1997 – Denis Malgin, Swiss ice hockey player
- 1998 – Aitana Bonmatí, Spanish footballer
- 1998 – Lisandro Martínez, Argentinian footballer
- 1998 – Éder Militão, Brazilian footballer
- 1999 – Karan Brar, American actor
- 1999 – Tee Higgins, American football player
- 1999 – Djorkaeff Reasco, Ecuadorian footballer
- 1999 – Gary Trent Jr., American basketball player
- 1999 – Mateus Ward, American actor
- 2002 – Anastasia Zakharova, Russian tennis player
- 2002 – Ki-Jana Hoever, Dutch footballer
- 2002 – Karim Adeyemi, German footballer
- 2003 – Wendy Shongwe, South African sprinter and soccer player
- 2009 – Lumi Pollack, American actress
- 2010 – Sophia Reid-Gantzert, Canadian actress and dancer

== Deaths ==
=== Pre-1600 ===
- 52 BC – Publius Clodius Pulcher, Roman politician (born 93 BC)
- 474 – Leo I, Byzantine emperor (born 401)
- 748 – Odilo, duke of Bavaria
- 896 – Khumarawayh ibn Ahmad ibn Tulun, ruler of the Tulunids, murdered (born 864)
- 1213 – Tamar of Georgia (born 1160)
- 1253 – King Henry I of Cyprus (born 1217)
- 1271 – Saint Margaret of Hungary (born 1242)
- 1326 – Robert FitzWalter, 1st Baron FitzWalter, English baron (born 1247)
- 1357 – Maria of Portugal, infanta (born 1313)
- 1367 – Peter I of Portugal (born 1320)
- 1411 – Jobst of Moravia, ruler of Moravia, King of the Romans
- 1425 – Edmund Mortimer, 5th Earl of March, English politician (born 1391)
- 1451 – Henry II, Count of Nassau-Siegen (1442–1451) (born 1414)
- 1471 – Emperor Go-Hanazono of Japan (born 1419)
- 1479 – Louis IX, Duke of Bavaria (born 1417)
- 1547 – Pietro Bembo, Italian cardinal and scholar (born 1470)
- 1586 – Margaret of Parma (born 1522)
- 1589 – Magnus Heinason, Faroese naval hero (born 1545)

=== 1601–1900 ===
- 1677 – Jan van Riebeeck, Dutch politician, founded Cape Town (born 1619)
- 1756 – Francis George of Schönborn-Buchheim, Archbishop-Elector of Trier (born 1682)
- 1783 – Jeanne Quinault, French actress and playwright (born 1699)
- 1803 – Ippolit Bogdanovich, Russian poet and academic (born 1743)
- 1849 – Panoutsos Notaras, Greek politician (born 1752)
- 1862 – John Tyler, American soldier, lawyer, and politician, 10th President of the United States (born 1790)
- 1873 – Edward Bulwer-Lytton, English author, poet, playwright, and politician, Secretary of State for the Colonies (born 1803)
- 1878 – Antoine César Becquerel, French physicist and academic (born 1788)
- 1886 – Baldassare Verazzi, Italian painter (born 1819)
- 1892 – Anton Anderledy, Swiss religious leader, 23rd Superior General of the Society of Jesus (born 1819)
- 1896 – Charles Floquet, French lawyer and politician, 55th Prime Minister of France (born 1828)

=== 1901–present ===
- 1919 – Prince John of the United Kingdom, Youngest son of George V and Mary of Teck (born 1905)
- 1923 – Wallace Reid, American actor, director, and screenwriter (born 1891)
- 1929 – Harry Coulby, American businessman (born 1865)
- 1934 – Joseph Devlin, Northern Irish political leader of the Nationalist Party (Northern Ireland) (born 1871)
- 1936 – Hermanus Brockmann, Dutch rower (born 1871)
- 1936 – Rudyard Kipling, English author and poet, Nobel Prize laureate (born 1865)
- 1940 – Kazimierz Przerwa-Tetmajer, Polish author, poet, and playwright (born 1865)
- 1951 – Amy Carmichael, Irish missionary and humanitarian (born 1867)
- 1952 – Curly Howard, American actor (born 1903)
- 1954 – Sydney Greenstreet, English-American actor (born 1879)
- 1955 – Saadat Hasan Manto, Pakistani author and screenwriter (born 1912)
- 1956 – Makbule Atadan, Turkish lawyer and politician (born 1885)
- 1956 – Konstantin Päts, Estonian journalist, lawyer, and politician, 1st President of Estonia (born 1874)
- 1963 – Hugh Gaitskell, English academic and politician, Chancellor of the Exchequer (born 1906)
- 1966 – Kathleen Norris, American journalist and author (born 1880)
- 1967 – Goose Tatum, American basketball player and soldier (born 1921)
- 1969 – Hans Freyer, German sociologist and philosopher (born 1887)
- 1970 – David O. McKay, American religious leader, 9th President of The Church of Jesus Christ of Latter-day Saints (born 1873)
- 1971 – Virgil Finlay, American illustrator (born 1914)
- 1973 – Irina Nikolaevna Levchenko, Russian tank commander (born 1924)
- 1975 – Gertrude Olmstead, American actress (born 1897)
- 1978 – Hasan Askari, Pakistani philosopher and author (born 1919)
- 1980 – Cecil Beaton, English fashion designer and photographer (born 1904)
- 1984 – Panteleimon Ponomarenko, Belarusian general and politician (born 1902)
- 1984 – Vassilis Tsitsanis, Greek singer-songwriter and bouzouki player (born 1915)
- 1989 – Bruce Chatwin, English-French author (born 1940)
- 1990 – Melanie Appleby, English singer (born 1966)
- 1990 – Rusty Hamer, American actor (born 1947)
- 1993 – Dionysios Zakythinos, Greek historian, academic, and politician (born 1905)
- 1995 – Adolf Butenandt, German biochemist and academic, Nobel Prize laureate (born 1903)
- 1995 – Ron Luciano, American baseball player and umpire (born 1937)
- 1996 – N. T. Rama Rao, Indian actor, director, producer, and politician, 10th Chief Minister of Andhra Pradesh (born 1923)
- 1997 – Paul Tsongas, American lawyer and politician (born 1941)
- 1998 – Dan Georgiadis, Greek footballer and manager (born 1922)
- 2000 – Margarete Schütte-Lihotzky, Austrian architect (born 1897)
- 2001 – Laurent-Désiré Kabila, President of the Democratic Republic of the Congo (born 1939)
- 2003 – Ed Farhat, American wrestler and trainer (born 1924)
- 2003 – Harivansh Rai Bachchan, Indian poet and author (born 1907)
- 2004 – Galina Gavrilovna Korchuganova, Russian-born Soviet test pilot and aerobatics champion (born 1935)
- 2005 – Lamont Bentley, American actor and rapper (born 1973)
- 2006 – Jan Twardowski, Polish priest and poet (born 1915)
- 2007 – Brent Liles, American bass player (born 1963)
- 2008 – Georgia Frontiere, American businesswoman and philanthropist (born 1927)
- 2008 – Frank Lewin, American composer and theorist (born 1925)
- 2008 – Lois Nettleton, American actress (born 1927)
- 2008 – John Stroger, American politician (born 1929)
- 2009 – Tony Hart, English painter and television host (born 1925)
- 2009 – Nora Kovach, Hungarian-American ballerina (born 1931)
- 2009 – Danai Stratigopoulou, Greek singer-songwriter (born 1913)
- 2009 – Grigore Vieru, Romanian poet and author (born 1935)
- 2010 – Kate McGarrigle, Canadian musician and singer-songwriter (born 1946)
- 2010 – Robert B. Parker, American author and academic (born 1932)
- 2011 – Sargent Shriver, American politician and diplomat, 21st United States Ambassador to France (born 1915)
- 2012 – Anthony Gonsalves, Indian composer and educator (born 1927)
- 2012 – Georg Lassen, German captain (born 1915)
- 2012 – Yuri Rasovsky, American playwright and producer, founded The National Radio Theater of Chicago (born 1944)
- 2013 – Sean Fallon, Irish footballer and manager (born 1922)
- 2013 – Jim Horning, American computer scientist and academic (born 1942)
- 2013 – Jon Mannah, Australian rugby league player (born 1989)
- 2013 – Lewis Marnell, Australian skateboarder (born 1982)
- 2013 – Ron Nachman, Israeli lawyer and politician (born 1942)
- 2014 – Kathryn Abbe, American photographer and author (born 1919)
- 2014 – Michael Botmang, Nigerian politician, 17th Governor of Plateau State (born 1938)
- 2014 – Dennis Frederiksen, American singer-songwriter (born 1951)
- 2014 – Andy Graver, English footballer (born 1927)
- 2014 – Sarah Marshall, English actress (born 1933)
- 2014 – Eugenio Cruz Vargas, Chilean poet and painter (born 1923)
- 2015 – Alberto Nisman, Argentinian lawyer and prosecutor (born 1963)
- 2015 – Christine Valmy, Romanian cosmetologist and author (born 1926)
- 2015 – Piet van der Sanden, Dutch journalist and politician (born 1924)
- 2015 – Tony Verna, American director and producer, invented instant replay (born 1933)
- 2016 – Johnny Bach, American basketball player and coach (born 1924)
- 2016 – Glenn Frey, American singer-songwriter, guitarist, and actor (born 1948)
- 2016 – T. S. Sinnathuray, Judge of the High Court of Singapore (born 1930)
- 2016 – Michel Tournier, French journalist and author (born 1924)
- 2017 – Peter Abrahams, South African-Jamaican writer (born 1919)
- 2017 – Rachael Heyhoe Flint, Baroness Heyhoe Flint, English cricketer, businesswoman and philanthropist (born 1939)
- 2017 – Roberta Peters, American coloratura soprano (born 1930)
- 2019 – John Coughlin, American figure skater (born 1985)
- 2019 – Lamia Al-Gailani Werr, Iraqi archaeologist (born 1938)
- 2022 – Francisco Gento, Spanish football player (born 1933)
- 2022 – Yvette Mimieux, American actress (born 1942)
- 2022 – André Leon Talley, American fashion journalist (born 1948)
- 2023 – David Crosby, American singer-songwriter (born 1941)
- 2025 – Claire van Kampen, English director and composer (born 1953)

== Holidays and observances ==
- Christian feast day:
  - Amy Carmichael (Church of England)
  - Athanasius of Alexandria (Eastern Orthodox Church)
  - Confession of Peter (Eastern Orthodox, some Anglican and Lutheran Churches)
  - Deicolus
  - Margaret of Hungary
  - Prisca
  - Blessed Regina Protmann
  - Volusianus of Tours
  - January 18 (Eastern Orthodox liturgics)
- Royal Thai Armed Forces Day (Thailand)
