= Petén =

Petén or Peten may refer to:

- Petén Department, a department of Guatemala
- Petén Basin, the geographical/archaeological region of Mesoamerica and a center of the Maya civilization
- Lake Petén Itzá, a lake in the Petén Basin region
- Peten Itza kingdom, a Maya kingdom in Central America centered on the city of Nojpetén
- The Hebrew name (Hebrew: פתן) for the Boeing AH-64A Apache in Israeli service, meaning "Cobra" in English
- Petén molly, a fish
