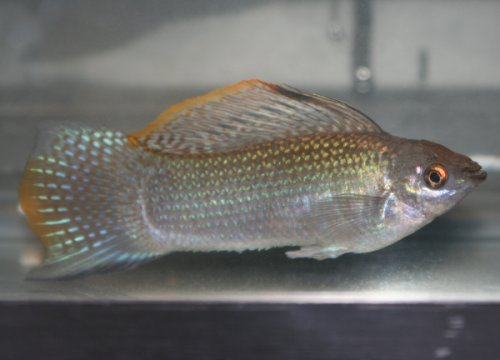
- A male

Conservation status
- Least Concern (IUCN 3.1)

Scientific classification
- Kingdom: Animalia
- Phylum: Chordata
- Class: Actinopterygii
- Division: Teleostei
- Order: Cyprinodontiformes
- Family: Poeciliidae
- Genus: Poecilia
- Species: P. kykesis

Binomial name
- Poecilia kykesis Poeser, 2002

= Poecilia kykesis =

Swordtail molly

Species of fish

Poecilia kykesis, also known as the Usumacinta molly, Petén molly, spiketail molly, or swordtail molly, is a poeciliid fish species native to the fresh and brackish waters of Mexico, Guatemala, and Belize. It belongs to the sailfin molly clade, with males exhibiting an enlarged dorsal fin. The species has a complex and controversial naming history, with the former name, Poecilia petenensis, now referring to a short-finned molly species. It is a livebearer sometimes kept in aquaria.

== Taxonomy ==
Poecilia kykesis belongs to the Poecilia latipinna (sailfin molly) species complex. There is some confusion regarding its scientific name. It was originally described by Günther (1866), who also described a short-finned molly now known as Poecilia petenensis. Günther placed the sailfin molly in the genus Mollienesia rather than Poecilia on the basis of the number of dorsal fin rays, calling it Mollienesia petenensis. After Regan (1913) established the principle of distinguishing poeciliid genera according to the shape of the gonopodium, both the sailfin and the short-finned molly were placed in the genus Mollienesia, the short-finned species being renamed Mollienesia gracilis.

Rosen and Bailey (1963) placed both species in the genus Poecilia; they simultaneously merged Mollienesia gracilis with Poecilia sphenops. Thus the species originally known as Poecilia petenensis, later Mollienesia gracilis, became a synonym of Poecilia sphenops, while the former Mollienesia petenensis was renamed Poecilia petenensis.

Poeser (2002) saw Rosen and Bailey's renaming as a nomenclatural error; he revalidated the short-finned molly as a separate species under its original name, Poecilia petenensis, while renaming the sail-fin molly Poecilia kykesis to avoid homonymy. The new specific epithet, kykesis, meaning "a mixing" or "confusion" in Greek, refers to this naming polemic.

Meyer et al. argue that the new name is not justified according to nomenclature codes and that the designation Poecilia petenensis, long established in literature, should be maintained for the sailfin species, with the short-finned molly under the name Poecilia gracilis.

Common names for the species include Usumacinta molly, Petén molly, spiketail molly, and swordtail molly.

Naming history
Common name	Günther (1866)	Regan (1913)	Rosen and Bailey (1963)	Poeser (2002)
Petén molly	Poecilia petenensis	Mollienesia gracilis	Poecilia sphenops	Poecilia petenensis
Swordtail molly	Mollienesia petenensis	Mollienesia petenensis	Poecilia petenensis	Poecilia kykesis

== Description ==
P. kykesis males grow to 13 cm in standard length, while the females attain 10 cm. The body of the fish does not exhibit any specific color other than the black margined scales that may form spots in adult males. The males possess an enlarged, sail-like dorsal fin similar to that of the males of the closely related species P. velifera and P. latipinna as well as a pronounced lower margin on the caudal fin (a "sword"). P. kykesis has fewer rays in the dorsal fin than P. velifera and more lateral scales than either P. velifera or P. latipinna.

== Distribution and habitat ==
Poecilia kykesis ranges from the Usumacinta River drainage and Lake Petén Itzá in Guatemala to Belize and the Yucatan Peninsula in southeastern Mexico. It was reported as an introduced species in the U.S. state of Florida in 1971, probably having escaped from aquaculture or having been released from an aquarium. The fish may have reproduced but apparently did not establish surviving populations, as the species has not been recorded in the United States since 1974.

Like other species from the P. latipinna complex, P. kykesis inhabits lakes, pools, tidal lagoons, creeks, and similar shallow waters of brackish to freshwater coastal areas. These waters may be clear or turbid, and the fish occur on substrates including sand, clay, and mud. Some of its preferred habitats feature submerged or emergent aquatic plants.

== Diet ==
Like other sailfin mollies, Poecilia kykesis is herbivorous and feeds primarily on cyanobacteria. This dietary preference is posited to have evolved as a result of the transition of the ancestors of the Mollienesia subgenus from freshwater to marine habitats.

== Reproduction ==
Poecilia kykesis is a livebearer, meaning that females give birth to live young. Unlike in related species, both large and small males exhibit both courtship display and forced insemination behaviors. Every 6-8 weeks the female delivers 10-60 fry, which are 8-12 mm long at birth. The adults rarely predate on the fry. The species readily hybridizes with P. velifera and P. latipinna, producing fertile offspring.

== Aquarium husbandry ==
Poecilia kykesis is peaceful enough to be kept in a community aquarium, though the males will only develop their distinctive sail fin in a spacious one. In captivity it requires a diet of algae and vegetable flakes and, due to its big appetite, good filtration and frequent partial water changes. The fish will nibble on softer-leaved plants, especially if lacking plant matter in their diet. A good plant cover allows some fry to survive to adulthood.
