= 1986 Aerovías Guatemala Caravelle crash =

Fatal aviation accident in Guatemala

1986 Aerovías Guatemala crash
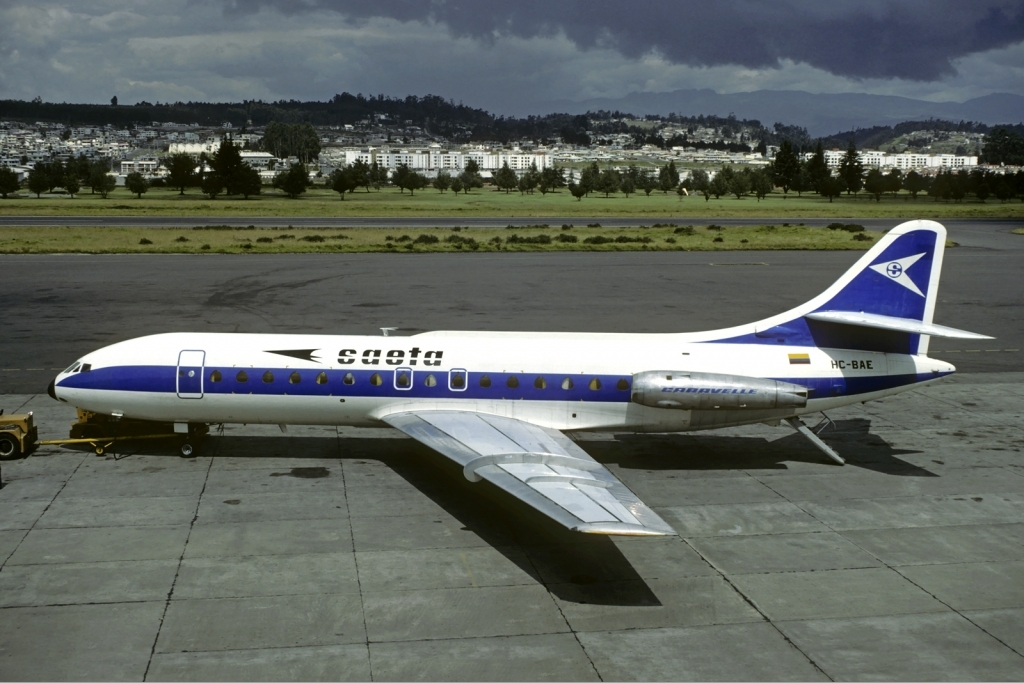
- HC-BAE, the aircraft involved, seen in November 1982 while in service with SAETA

Accident
- Date: January 18, 1986
- Summary: Controlled flight into terrain for undetermined reasons
- Site: Flores, Guatemala; 16°52′59″N 89°46′55″W

Aircraft
- Aircraft type: Sud Aviation SE-210 Caravelle III
- Operator: Aerovías
- Registration: HC-BAE
- Flight origin: La Aurora International Airport, Guatemala City, Guatemala
- Destination: Santa Elena Airport, Flores, Guatemala
- Occupants: 93
- Passengers: 87
- Crew: 6
- Fatalities: 93
- Survivors: 0

The 1986 Aerovías Guatemala air crash occurred on 18 January 1986 and involved a Sud Aviation SE-210 Caravelle III that crashed into a hill on approach to Santa Elena Airport, Flores, Guatemala after a short flight from Guatemala City's La Aurora International Airport. All 93 passengers and crew on board were killed, making it the worst air disaster in Guatemalan history.

== Aircraft ==
The aircraft involved was a Sud Aviation SE-210 Caravelle III built in 1960. It was converted to a series 6N standard in 1962. Ecuadorian airline SAETA purchased the aircraft in 1975. Aerovías in Guatemala leased it from SAETA in 1985 in response to the increasing number of tourists visiting Guatemala.

== Accident ==
This 40-minute flight was taking Guatemalan and foreign tourists from Guatemala City to Santa Elena Airport, in Flores, some 270 kilometres (170 mi) northeast of Guatemala City. Flores is a common staging point for visits to the ancient Maya city of Tikal. The aircraft took off on Saturday morning at 7:25 local time from La Aurora International Airport in Guatemala City with 87 passengers and 6 crew on board. After approximately 30 minutes the aircraft was cleared to land at Santa Elena Airport. However the first approach was too high and the aircraft overshot the runway. On its second approach the aircraft crashed and caught fire about 8 km from the airport. The control tower's last contact with the crew occurred at 7:58, 33 minutes into the 40-minute flight, with no reports of any anomalies. The accident killed all 93 people on board: 87 passengers and 6 crew members. The aircraft was completely destroyed in the accident.

== Cause ==
An investigation carried out into the crash was unable to determine the exact cause of the accident. Low cloud cover may have caused the pilots to lose orientation and crash.

== Notable passengers ==
Former Venezuelan Foreign Affairs Minister, Arístides Calvani, his wife, and two daughters perished in the crash.

== See also ==
- Air New Zealand Flight 901
- Prinair Flight 277
