= Santa Elena, Guatemala =

Coordinates: 16.917146°N 89.899026°W

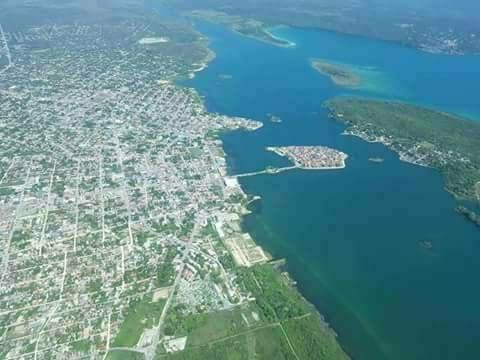
Santa Elena de la Cruz

Santa Elena is located on the shores of Lake Petén Itzá in the Petén department of Guatemala. It is connected by a causeway to its sister town of Flores (the capital of the Petén department) and the two (together with San Benito) are often referred to as just Flores. It is the location for Mundo Maya International Airport, which is located just outside the town. It is roughly 300 miles north of Guatemala City.
