= MGTK =

MGTK may stand for:

- mGTK, glue code to make GTK+ accessible from Standard ML
- MGTK, the U.S. Environmental Protection Agency's Municipal Government Toolkit, a compilation of fact sheets, case studies, recycling reports, and links to online tools aimed at helping improve community recycling programs
- MGTK, the ICAO code for Mundo Maya International Airport, Guatemala
- MGTK, the stock exchange code for Magnesium Technologies Inc.
