= Tayasal (archaeological site) =

Maya archeological site in Guatemala

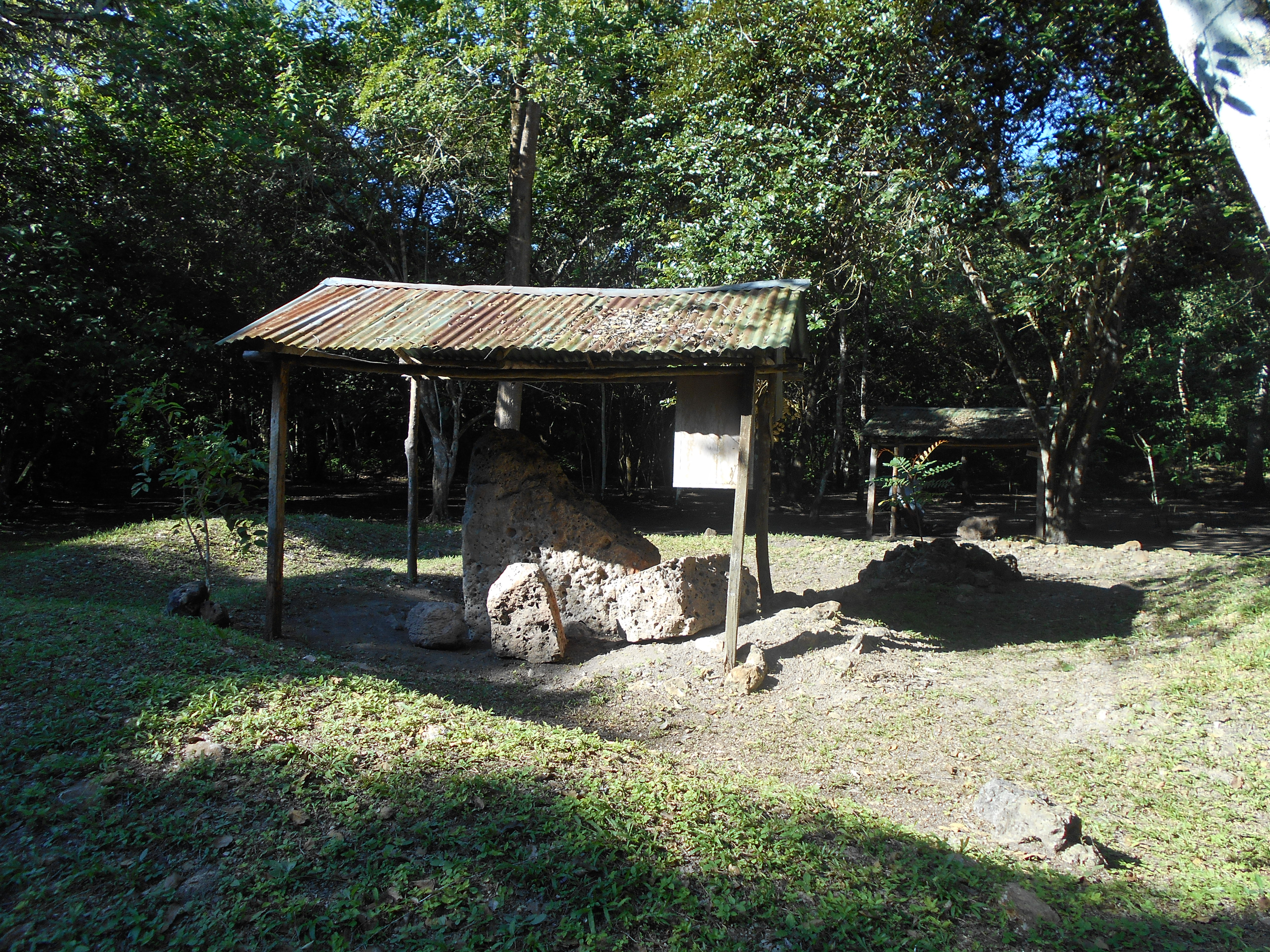
- Stelae in the main plaza
- Interactive map of Tayasal
- 16.940251°N 89.892413°W
- Cultures: Maya
- Location: Flores, Petén
- Region: Guatemala

History
- Built: Preclassic Period
- Abandoned: Postclassic Period
- Responsible body: Ministerio de Cultura y Deportes

Tayasal is a Maya archaeological site located in present-day Guatemala. It was a large Maya city with a long history of occupation. Tayasal is a corruption of Tah Itza ("Place of the Itza"), a term originally used to refer to the core of the Itza territory in Petén. The name Tayasal was applied in error to the archaeological site, and originally applied to the Itza capital. However, the name now refers to the peninsula supporting both the archaeological site and the village of San Miguel. The site was occupied from the Middle Preclassic period (c. 1000–350 BC) through to the Late Postclassic (c. 1200–1539 AD).

The site is a protected national monument.

== Location ==
The Tayasal archaeological site is situated on a peninsula on Lake Petén Itzá a short distance to the north of the modern town of Flores, separated from it by a 270-metre (890 ft) wide stretch of water, and falls within the municipality of Flores, in the department of Petén in northern Guatemala. The site covers an area of approximately 2.75 square kilometres (1.06 sq mi). The southern portion of the peninsula also hosts the modern village of San Miguel, which probably covers a portion of the Postclassic occupation of the site. The peninsula fell within the core of the Postclassic Itza territory.

The protected area of the archaeological site is defined by the lakeshore to the north and west, and by the modern village of San Miguel to the south and east.

== Site history ==
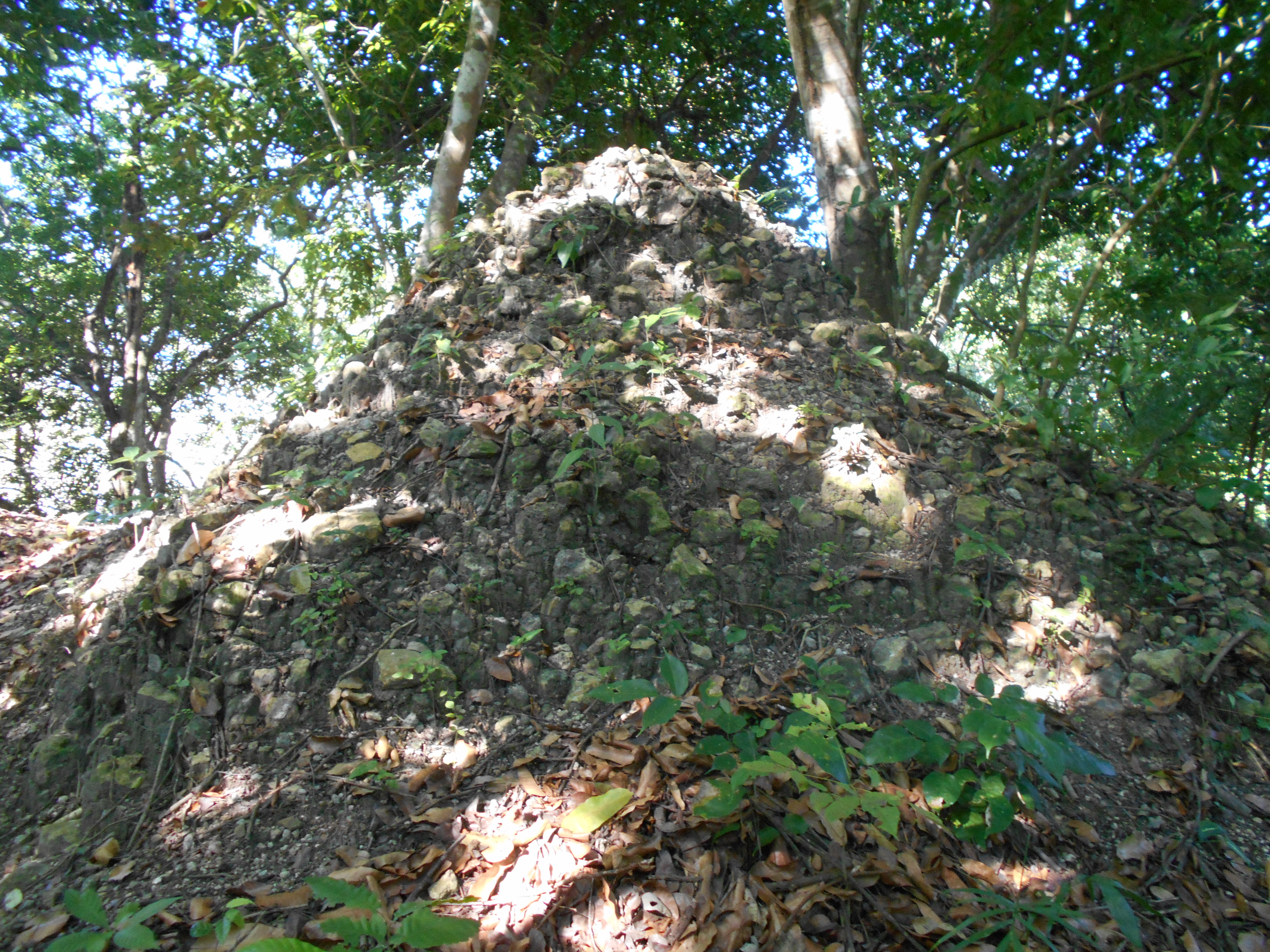
Remains of a structure on the main plaza

The Tayasal peninsula showed intense activity during the Late Preclassic (c. 400 BC - 250 AD). At this time, the city fully reflected ongoing developments in the Maya region, such as monumental architecture that included typical Preclassic Maya architectural forms such as the triadic pyramid and the E-Group ceremonial complex. Activity at the site continued right through to the Postclassic period. Investigations have identified that most Postclassic and colonial activity was concentrated on the southern shore of the peninsula. Very little is known about the use of the peninsula during the time of first contact with the Spanish, although early colonial accounts reported that the Itza frequently conducted rituals there. Evidence of Spanish contact includes a musketball excavated at the site. In 1702 and 1703, shortly after the Spanish conquest of Petén, Spanish missions were established on the Tayasal peninsula at San Miguel and San Bernabé, although the population of San Bernabé dropped off sharply through the course of the 18th century due to high infant mortality.

=== Modern history ===
The Tayasal archaeological site was declared a national monument in 1931. The University of Pennsylvania mapped the site in 1971, and its limits were defined by the Instituto de Antropología e Historia (Institute of Anthropology and History) in 1994. Tayasal has been excavated sporadically since the 1920s, beginning with Guthe's excavations in 1921–1922, continuing with Morley's dig in 1937 to 1938, by several others in the 1950s and 60s. The University of Pennsylvania undertook excavations in 1971, and again in 1977. The Proyecto Maya Colonial undertook a month-long investigation of the site in 1996. The Proyecto Arqueológico Tayasal was launched in 2009, with particular emphasis on the period of contact with the Spanish, and the early colonial years. The project also remapped the site with the objective of correcting any errors from the 1971 mapping project.

== Site description ==
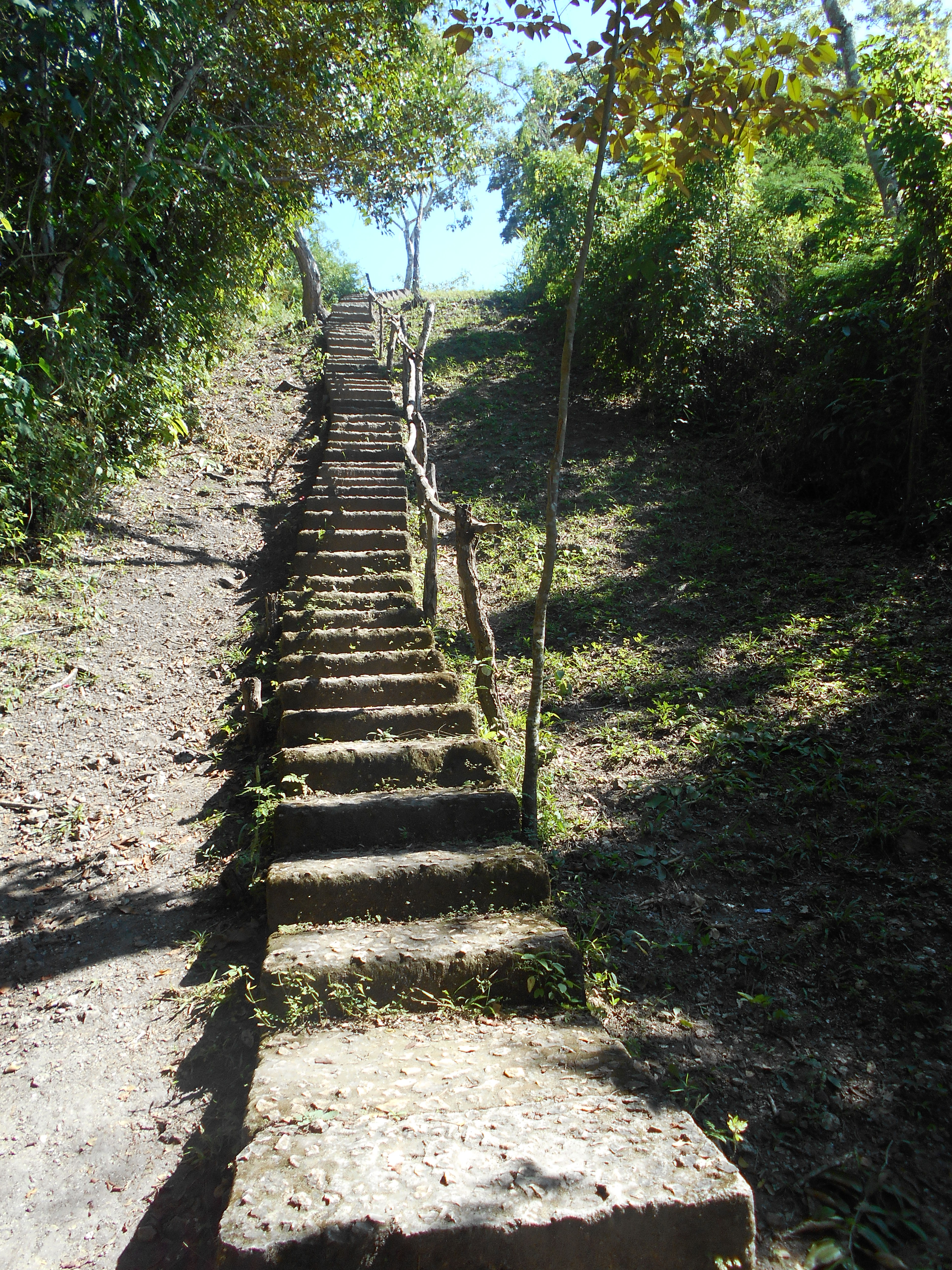
The Mirador del rey Can'Ek was a triadic pyramid dating to the Late Preclassic

The University of Pennsylvania project mapped 339 structures; the city possessed large open plazas, palaces, pyramid-temples, an acropolis, defensive walls, residential buildings, and a cenote. As many as fifty burials and twelve caches have been recovered from Tayasal. The site core includes a number of large structures dating to the Classic period.

Mirador del rey Can'Ek "King Kan Ek''s Lookout" (Structures T65-T67) was a triadic pyramid, consisting of a massive pyramidal platform with a single access stairway, supporting two lesser structures flanking a principal structure. This architectural form dates it to the Late Preclassic. It was built on the higher portion of the peninsula.

Cerro Moo (Structures T256-T258) was another triadic pyramid, dating to the Late Preclassic, also built on the higher ground of the peninsula.

Group 23 is located to the southwest of the acropolis. It appears to have been built in the Late Preclassic as an E-Group. The E-Group axis is oriented 9° to the south of the east–west line, leading investigators to conclude that it was never used as an astronomical observatory as at other sites, but rather served a purely ceremonial function. It consists of a radial structure to the west and a long basal platform to the east that supported three buildings. At Tayasal, the radial structure appears to have been covered by later construction, including a group of structures dating to the Late Postclassic.

=== San Bernabé ===
The San Bernabé portion of the site occupies the northwestern area of the Tayasal peninsula. Various structures in this area have been dated to the Late Preclassic. After the Spanish conquest, San Bernabé was one of two Spanish missions established on the peninsula.

Colonial Migration Patterns and Population Movement at The Mission at San Bernabé, Guatemala

The Colonial period in the Petén region of Guatemala began in 1697, when Spanish forces defeated the Itza ruler Kan Ek' at Nojpetén. Following the conquest, the Spanish reorganized the locals into mission communities around Lake Petén Itza to gain colonial control. One of the first colonial constructions was a church at Nuestra Señora de los Remedios y San Pablo, Laguna de Itza. The settlement was later developed into the modern city of Flores.

By 1734, seventeen mission settlements had been established around the lake, including Mission San Bernabé, along with San Miguel, San Andrés, and San Jerónimo. The Spaniards established ranches throughout the region as well. While some migration occurred, many residents of these missions were locals and a part of the Maya population. Records link Kowoj and Mopan (Maya individuals) with settlements such as San Bernabé. Historical evidence and records link Kowoj and Mopan with settlements like San Bernabé, indicating that there could be limited to no movement from the other nearby sites and civilizations.

Archaeological evidence suggests that most inhabitants of these missions came from nearby communities and other civilizations. Excavations at San Bernabé reveal the majority of the Maya population, while material remains also show cultural changes associated with colonial rule.

Structure T29 was a platform measuring 23 by 23 metres (75 by 75 ft) and has a height of 0.5 metres (1.6 ft). It was built in the Late Preclassic and was reused in the Postclassic. It continued in use into the colonial period, and excavators recovered a number of colonial artefacts around the structure, including a silver Spanish coin, probably a real, Maiolica pottery, a lead bullet. It is likely that the platform supported a colonial-period residence.

Structure T30 was a circular structure in the northwestern portion of the site. It was elongated, measuring 23 metres (75 ft) east-west by 18.7 metres (61 ft) north-south, and stood 1 metre (3.3 ft) high. It dates to the Preclassic, and served as the basal platform for four structures (denominated T-30a to T30d).

Structure T30a is a circular platform measuring 5.17 metres (17.0 ft) across, and standing 22 centimetres (8.7 in) high. Its wall consists of three courses of soft limestone blocks, and its fill consists of a mix of soil and small stones. Recovered potsherds are dated to the Late Preclassic Chicanel Phase. A number of ritual deposits were excavated that date to the Late to Terminal Classic period, indicating continued use of the platform long after its construction. Although the majority of the building's fill was Late Preclassic, the fill on the east side was dated to the Terminal Classic.

== Iconography ==
Tayasal iconography is typical of Maya artefacts found in the surrounding Petén region that date approximately to the same time period. Examples of the imagery can be found on three excavated vases. The vases accompanied an individual who was interred at Tayasal during the Terminal Classic period; circa 8th century AD. The vases' images are thought to represent the elite status concerns, similar to those as depicted on carved stelae at neighbouring sites.
