= Poecilia petenensis =

Petén molly

Conservation status
- Data Deficient (IUCN 3.1)

Scientific classification
- Kingdom: Animalia
- Phylum: Chordata
- Class: Actinopterygii
- Division: Teleostei
- Order: Cyprinodontiformes
- Family: Poeciliidae
- Genus: Poecilia
- Species: P. petenensis

Binomial name
- Poecilia petenensis Günther, 1866

Species of fish

Poecilia petenensis, the Petén molly, is a poeciliid fish species endemic to Guatemala.

== Taxonomy ==
The Petén molly is a short-finned molly (part of the Poecilia sphenops complex) whose scientific name is a matter of some confusion. It was originally described by Günther (1866), who named it Poecilia petenensis. Günther (1866) also described the swordtail molly under the name Mollienesia petenensis. Regan (1913) placed both mollies in the genus Mollienesia, renaming the short-finned species Mollienesia gracilis.

When Rosen and Bailey (1963) revised the poeciliids, they placed both the swordtail and the short-finned molly in the genus Poecilia and made the short-finned species a synonym for Poecilia sphenops. Poeser (2002) revalidated Poecilia petenensis as a separate species, leading to homonymity with the swordtail species, which was duly renamed Poecilia kykesis.

Meyer et al. hold that Poeser (2002) broke nomenclature codes. They argue that the designation Poecilia petenensis should continue to refer to the swordtail molly and that the short-finned molly should instead be named Poecilia gracilis.

Naming history
Common name	Günther (1866)	Regan (1913)	Hubbs (1935)	Rosen & Bailey (1963)	Brett & Turner (1983)	Poeser (2002)
Petén molly	Poecilia petenensis	Mollienesia gracilis	Mollienesia sphenops gracilis	Poecilia sphenops	Poecilia "gracilis"	Poecilia petenensis
Swordtail molly	Mollienesia petenensis	unchanged	unchanged	Poecilia petenensis	unchanged	Poecilia kykesis

== Description ==
The largest examined Poecilia petenensis female measured 119 mm in standard length, while the largest males attained 93 mm. The body is relatively slender, more so than in the otherwise similar species P. teresae, and somewhat higher in the males than in the females. The sides of the fish are spotted, which is more pronounced in females. Larger females exhibit a diamond pattern on their sides. The fins are mostly without pigment.

== Distribution ==
Poecilia petenensis is endemic to the freshwater Lake Petén Itzá in Guatemala.
