= Aerovías =

Guatemalan airline

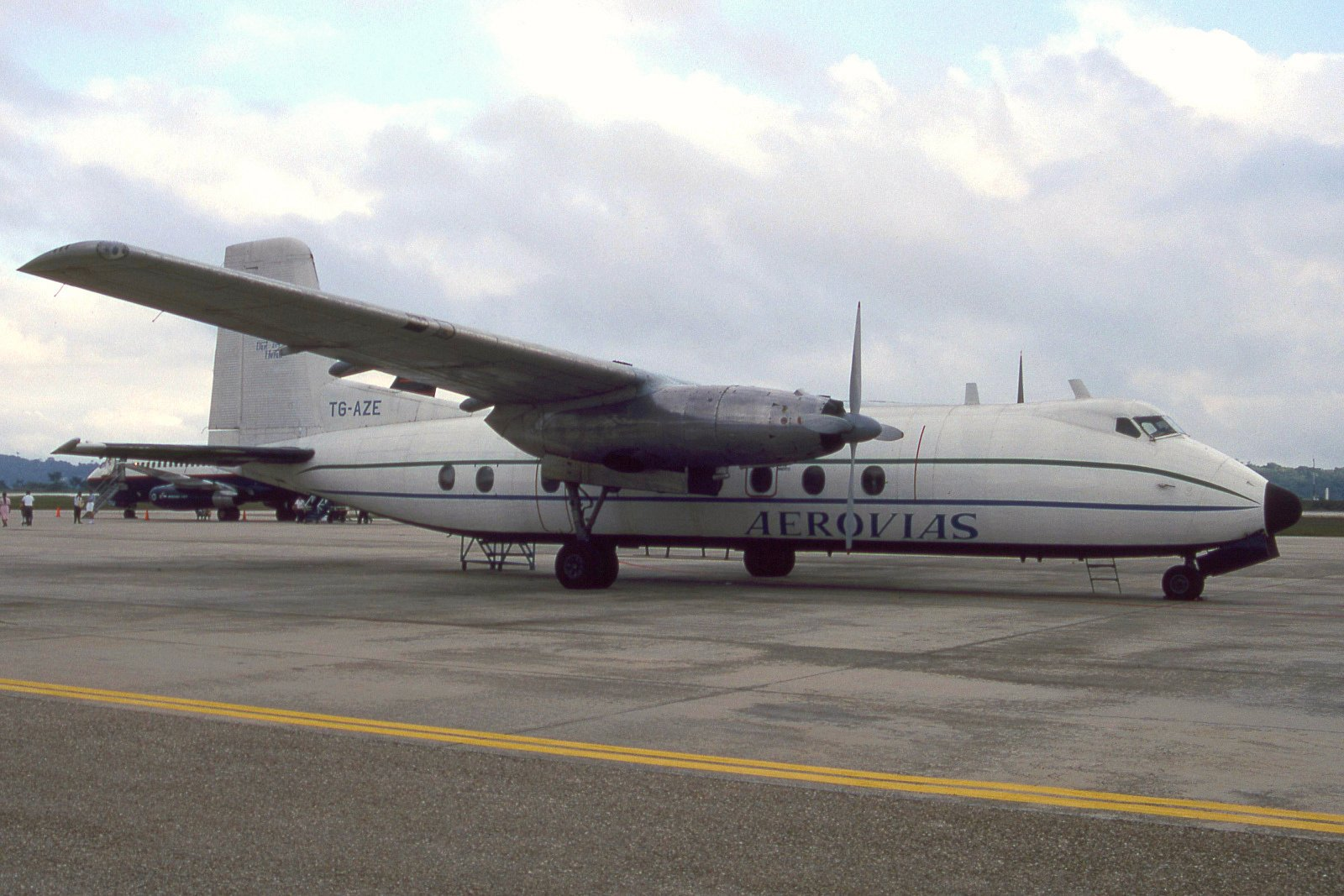
- A Herald of Aerovias
IATA	ICAO	Call sign
XU	AOQ	Aerovias
- Founded: 1977
- Ceased operations: 1998
- Hubs: La Aurora Int'l Airport
- Focus cities: Mundo Maya Int'l Airport
- Fleet size: 10
- Destinations: 4
- Parent company: Aerovías, S.A.
- Headquarters: Guatemala City, Guatemala

Aerovías is a defunct private passenger and cargo airline formerly based in Guatemala La Aurora International Airport founded by Jimmy K Hall. It was the first private airline in Guatemala. It was operational between 1977 and 1998. While one of their Heralds 206s aircraft was stored at La Aurora International Airport, their two Aérospatiale N 262s went to RACSA airlines.

== Fleet ==
The Aerovías fleet included the following aircraft:

- 2 Handley Page Herald 206 1988 TG-ASA; 1987 TG-AZE
- 1 Lockheed L-188 Electra TG-ANP
- 1 Douglas DC-6, 1987 TG-CGO
- 1 Boeing 727-100, 1992 TG-LKA
- 1 Boeing 727-100F, 1992 TG-ANP (leased from Corsair)
- 1 Boeing 737-200, 1992 TG-ANP
- 2 Aérospatiale N 262, 1994 TG-ANP; 1997 TG-NTR
- 1 Sud Aviation Caravelle, 1986 HC-BAE (leased from Saeta)

== Destinations ==
- Flores Mundo Maya International Airport
- Cancún International Airport
- Miami International Airport (cargo only)
- Belize Philip S. W. Goldson International Airport

== Incidents ==
- 18 January 1986: A Sud Aviation Caravelle temporarily leased from Ecuadorian airline SAETA, reg. HC-BAE, crashed after two missed approaches into the jungle, killing all 87 occupants on board. The flight originated in Guatemala City and was to land at Mundo Maya International Airport in the northern department of Petén. To date, this is the worst air accident in Guatemala.
