= Mundo Maya International Airport =

Mundo Maya International Airport Aeropuerto Internacional Mundo Maya
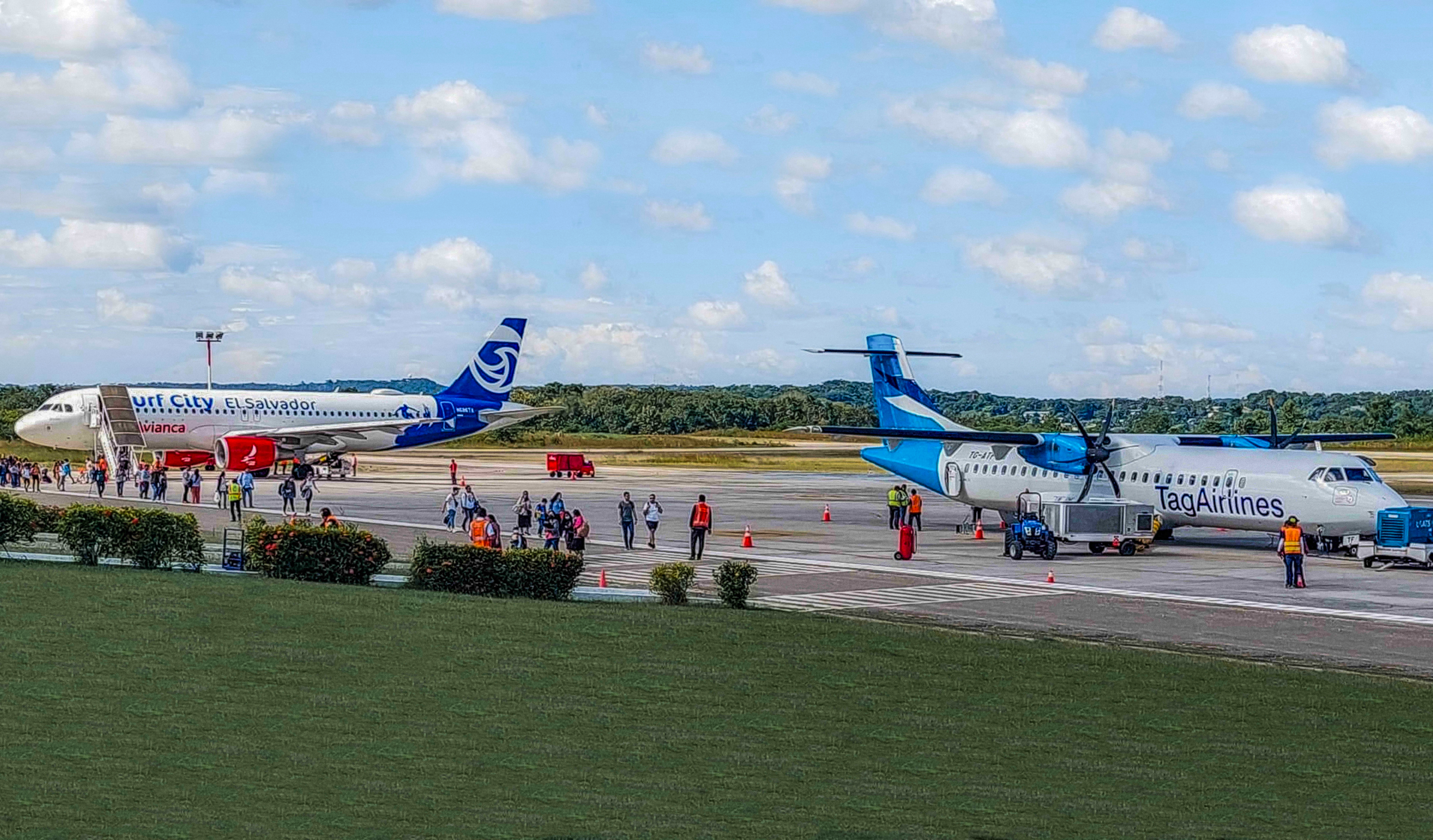
- IATA: FRS; ICAO: MGMM

Summary
- Airport type: Military/Public
- Operator: Dirección General de Aeronáutica Civil
- Location: Flores, Guatemala
- Focus city for: TAG Airlines
- Elevation AMSL: 118 m (387 ft)
- Coordinates: 16°54′50″N 089°51′59″W

Map
- Location in Petén Department Location in Guatemala

Runways
Direction	Length		Surface
Direction	m	ft	Surface
10/28	3,000	9,843	Concrete

Statistics (2022)
- Total Passengers: 186,324
- Source: Guatemalan AIP DGAC

Mundo Maya International Airport (Spanish: Aeropuerto Internacional Mundo Maya, IATA: FRS, ICAO: MGMM), formerly Flores International Airport as indicated by its IATA code, is an international airport located in the suburb of Santa Elena, in the city of Flores, Guatemala. It serves national and international air traffic for the areas of Flores, Santa Elena, and San Benito, as well as all the Maya sites of Tikal or Yaxhá and destinations such as Guatemala City and Belize.

The airport lacks many amenities compared to other airports its size. It only has 1 small cafe landside, and a large sitting area and shop airside. Despite its size and lack of jetbridges, lounges, and restaurants, it is still Guatemala's second busiest airport.

In 2012, the ICAO airport identifier for Mundo Maya International Airport changed from MGTK to MGMM.

== Airlines and destinations ==
Airlines	Destinations
Avianca Guatemala	Guatemala City
TAG Airlines	Guatemala City

== Statistics ==
Mundo Maya International airport is the country's second busiest airport and it is one of the busiest airports in Central America. In 2018, Mundo Maya International Airport reported 144,772 passengers, a 5.4% yearly increase

FRS passenger totals, 2015–2018 (thousands)
Source: Directorate General of Civil Aviation

	Number of passengers	Percentage change	Number of movements	Percentage change
2015	111,075	N.A.	6,826	N.A.
2016	113,444	▲2.13%	6,915	▲1.30%
2017	137,348	▲21.07%	7,042	▲1.84%
2018	144,772	▲5.41%	7,851	▲11.49%
Source: Directorate General of Civil Aviation of Guatemala

== Accidents and incidents ==
- On 30 September 1977, a Douglas C47A TG-AKA of Aviateca was damaged beyond economic repair in a landing accident. One of the three crew members was killed.
- On 26 July 1978, a Douglas DC-3 TG-AFA of Aviateca overran the runway following a birdstrike on take-off and was reported to have been damaged beyond economic repair. The aircraft was later repaired and returned to service.
- On 7 May 1979, a Douglas DC-3 TG-SAB of TAPSA was substantially damaged in a landing accident when it departed the runway and collided with a car. The aircraft was subsequently repaired and returned to service.
- On 18 January 1986, a Sud Aviation SE-210 Caravelle III from Aerovias, crashed into a hill on its final approach, about 8 km from the airport. All 93 passengers and crew on board were killed, making it the worst air disaster in Guatemalan history.

== See also ==
- Transport in Guatemala
- List of airports in Guatemala
