= Lake Petén Itzá =

Lake in Petén Department, Guatemala

Lake Petén Itza
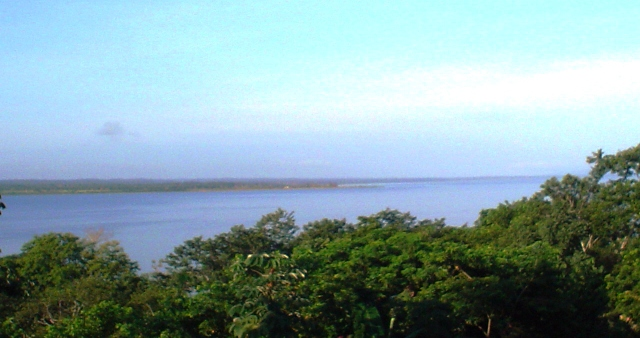
- Lake view from the Northeastern shore

- Location within Guatemala
- Coordinates: 16°59′0″N 89°48′0″W
- Primary inflows: Rio Ixlú, Rio Ixpó
- Primary outflows: (subterranean)
- Basin countries: Guatemala
- Surface area: 99 km^{2} (38 sq mi)
- Max. depth: 160 m (520 ft)
- Surface elevation: 110 m (360 ft)
- Sections/sub-basins: Main north basin, shallow south basin

Lake Petén Itzá (Lago Petén Itzá, Spanish pronunciation: [ˈlaɣo peˈten iˈtsa]) is a lake in the northern Petén Department in Guatemala. It is the third largest lake in Guatemala, after Lake Izabal and Lake Atitlán. It is located around 16°59′0″N 89°48′0″W. It has an area of 99 km^{2} (38 mi^{2}), and is some 32 km (20 mi) long and 5 km (3.1 mi) wide. Its maximum depth is 160 m (520 ft). The lake area presents high levels of migration, due to the existence of natural resources such as wood, chewing gum, oil, and agricultural and pasture activities. Because of its archaeological richness, around 150,000 tourists pass through this region yearly. The city of Flores, the capital of the Petén Department, lies on Flores Island near its southern shore.

Several streams flow into Lake Petén Itzá, but it has no surface outflow. Although it loses water mostly by evaporation, it is not a salt lake.

== Notable sites ==
There are at least 27 Maya sites around this lake and the archaeological remains of Tayasal, located across the lake on a peninsula close to the former Itza Maya capital, the last to be conquered in Mesoamerica in 1697.

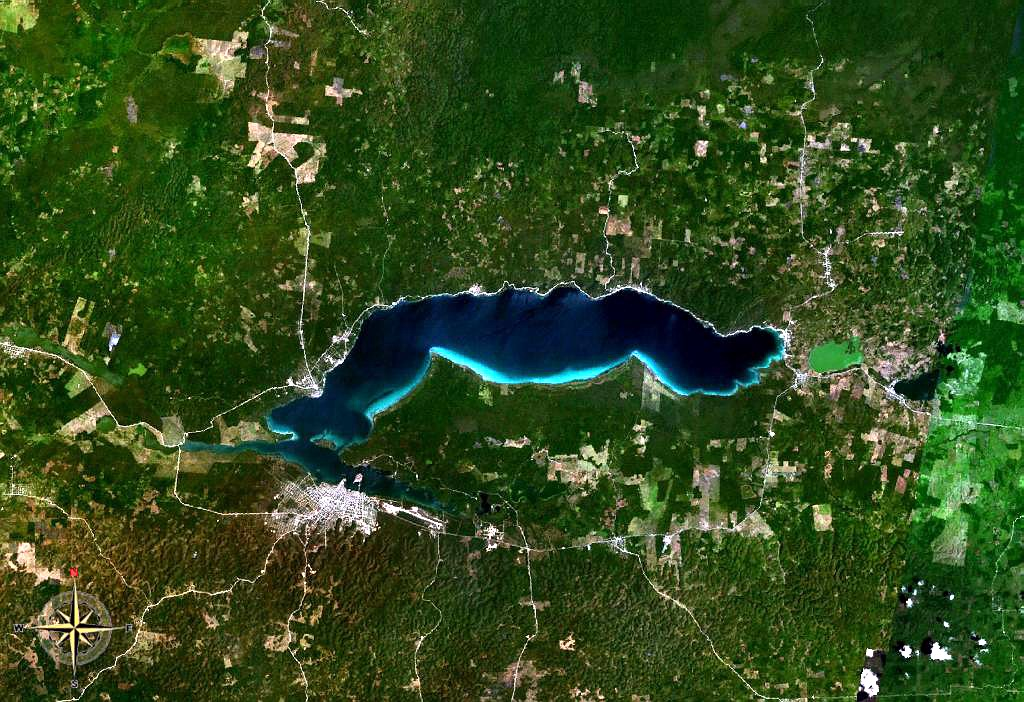
Lake Petén Itzá seen from space

== Fauna ==
This lake and its surroundings have more than 100 important indigenous species such as the cichlid fish Mayaheros urophthalmus, Petenia splendida and Vieja melanurus, the endemic Poecilia petenensis, crocodiles (Crocodylus moreletii and Crocodylus acutus), jaguars (Panthera onca), pumas (Puma concolor), white-tailed deer (Odocoileus virginianus), Central American red brocket (Mazama temama), and several bird species, including parrots such as macaws, and toucans. On its northeast shore is the Cerro Cahui Protected Biotope, a natural reserve for butterflies that covers 1,600-acre (6.5 km^{2}) and is home to toucans, Geoffroy's spider monkey (Ateles geoffroyi), Guatemalan black howler monkeys (Alouatta pigra), and many other rainforest species.

Limnologically, the lake's shallow littoral zones feature extensive charophyte beds and submerged macrophyte communities that provide critical nursery habitats for native cichlid populations and endemic aquatic fauna.
