= Flores, Petén =

Flores
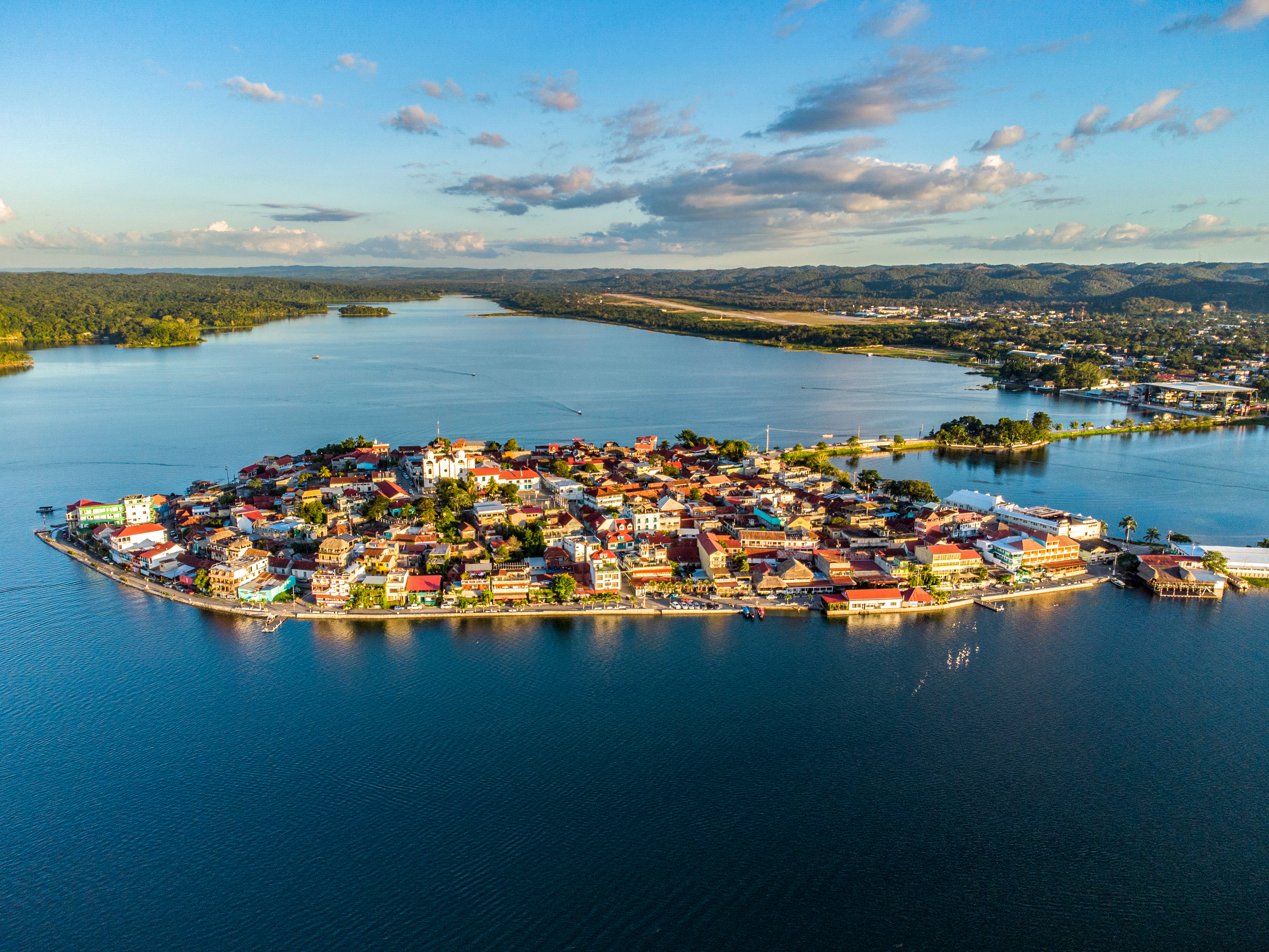
- Aerial view of Flores, with the island of Flores in the foreground

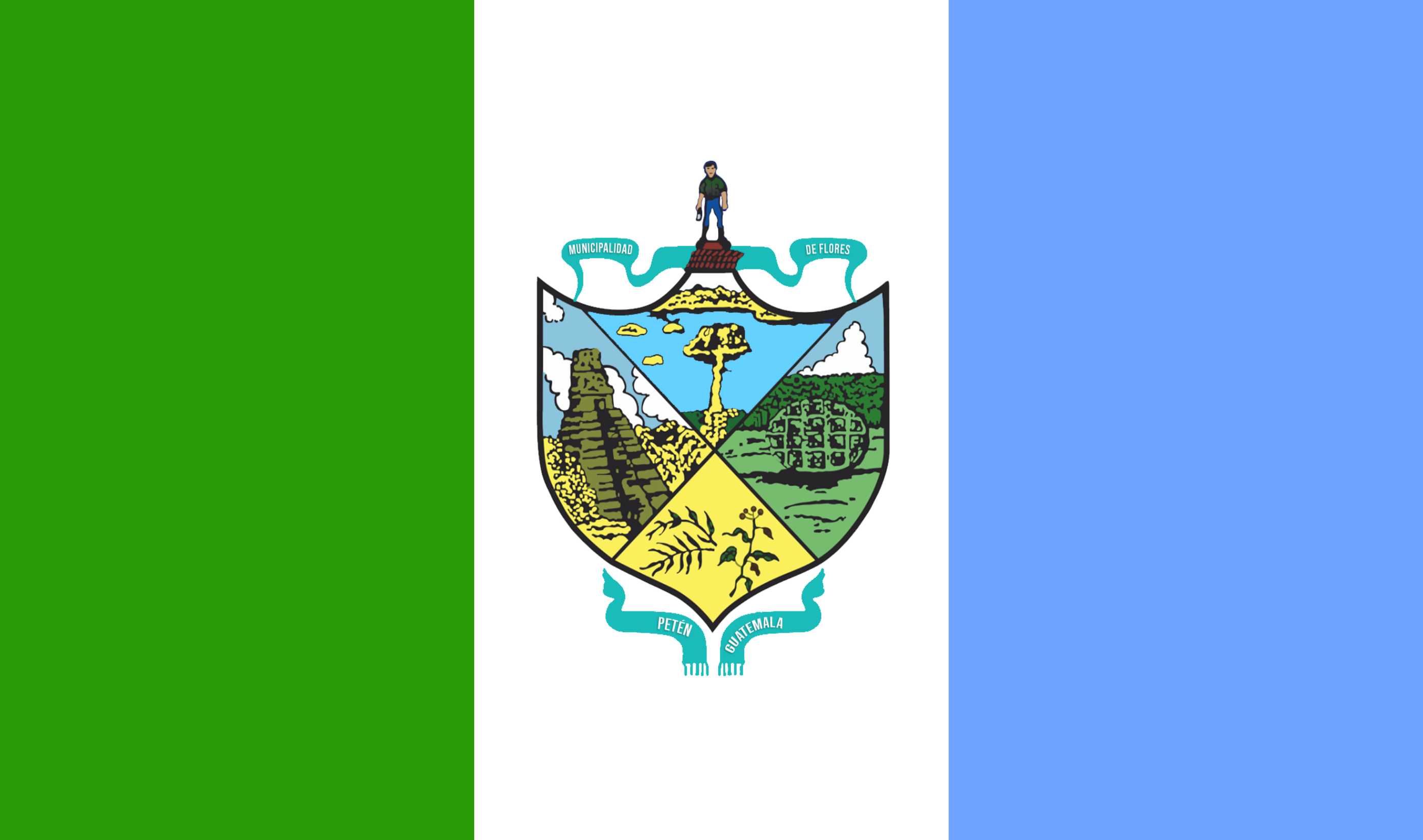
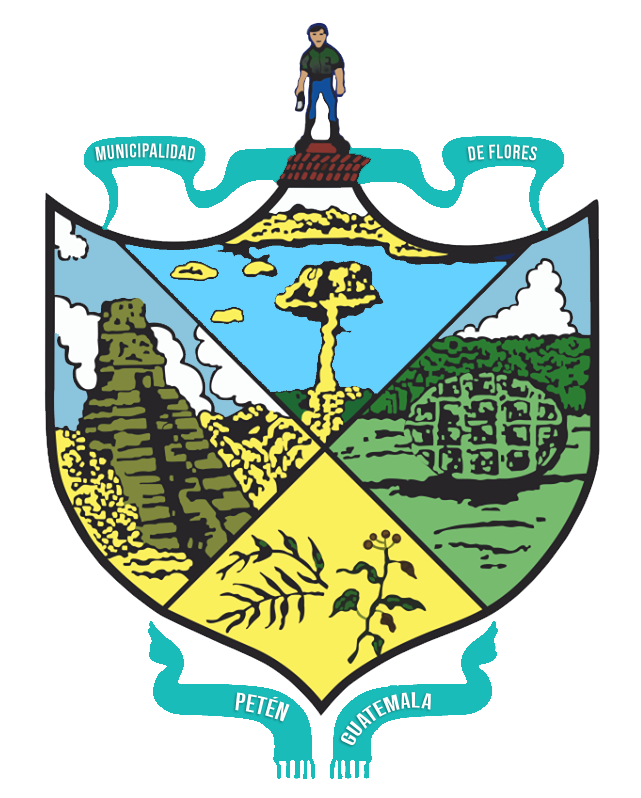
- Flag Seal

- Location in Guatemala
- Coordinates: 16°55′47″N 89°53′30″W
- Country: Guatemala
- Department: El Petén

Government
  - Mayor: Ramón Eduardo Méndez Chávez

Population (2023)
  - City: 45,560
  - Urban: 20,464
- Climate: Am

Flores is the capital of the Petén Department, Guatemala's landlocked, sparsely populated northernmost department. The population was 45,560 in 2023. Flores is the seat of the municipality of Flores (population 22,600).

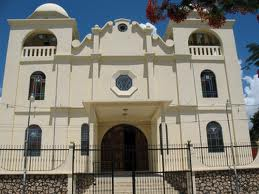
Catedral Nuestra Señora de Los Remedios y San Pablo Itzá

Its Catedral Nuestra Señora de Los Remedios y San Pablo Itzá is the cathedral episcopal seat of the Apostolic Vicariate of El Petén (formerly a territorial prelature).

The old part of the city is located on an island on Lake Petén Itzá, connected to the mainland by a short causeway. On the mainland is the suburb Santa Elena and, to the West, the contiguous municipality of San Benito. The municipality of Flores also includes a wide swathe of rural territory stretching north from Lake Petén Itzá to the Mexican border.

Flores is a major tourist destination in Guatemala, serving as a jumping-off point to Tikal and other Mayan ruins.

== History ==
In Pre-Columbian times, Flores was the Maya city of Nojpetén.

=== Nojpetén ===
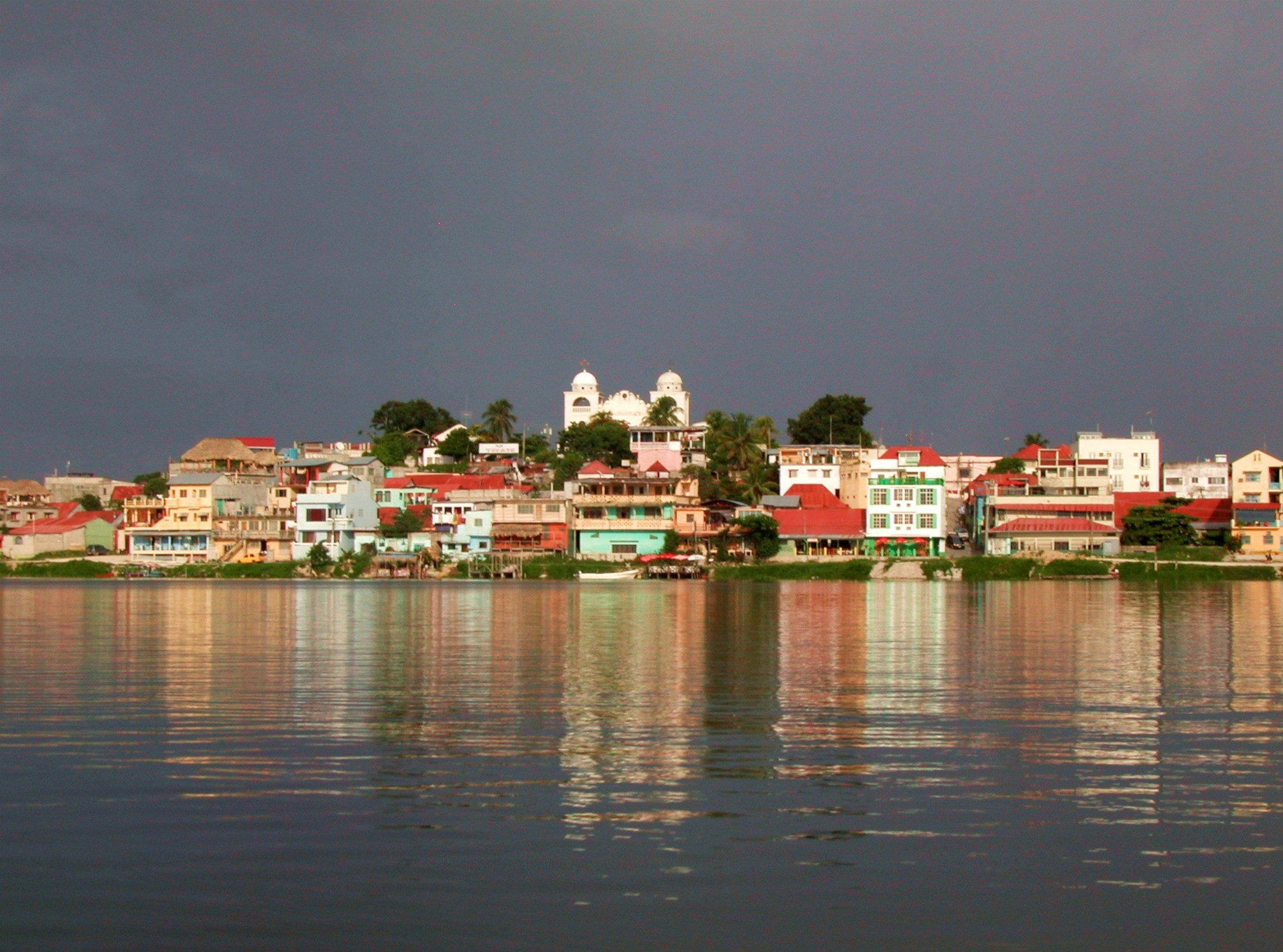
View of Flores from Lake Peten Itza, Petén

Earliest archaeological traces on the island date back to 900–600 BC, with a major expansion of the settlement occurring around 250–400 AD, making it one of the oldest continuously inhabited cities in the Americas.

The Itza left the Yucatán region in the 13th century and founded the city later known as Tayasal as their capital. They called it Nojpetén, (noj peten, literally "Great Island" in the Itza language). The Spanish called it Tayasal, possibly derived from ta Itza, or "Place of the Itza".

It was here, on the island of Flores on the shore of Lake Petén Itzá, that the last independent Maya state held out against the Spanish conquerors. In 1541, Hernán Cortés came to the island, en route to Honduras, but needed to move on and did not try to conquer it.

The Spanish did not manage to conquer the island until 1697, when they marched in, attacked via boats, and destroyed it. Those who could flee did so, and many Itzá people hid in the jungle for years. From the ruins of Nojpetén arose the modern city of Flores.

Archival and archaeological investigations reveal that prior to its destruction, the insular capital functioned as an intricately planned ceremonial center featuring over twenty temples, public plazas, and monumental defensive structures arranged to reflect the Itza's cosmological layout across Lake Petén Itzá.

The modern city can thus be regarded as the second oldest continuously inhabited settlement in the Americas, after Cholula.

== Climate ==
Flores has a tropical monsoon climate (Köppen Am) with year-round high temperatures. It has a lengthy wet season stretching from May to January, and a relatively brief dry season from February to April. As is typical with most monsoon climates, there is also some rainfall in the dry season, albeit significantly lighter. Daytime highs generally hover in the 30 to 33 °C (86 to 91 °F) range for most of the year, falling slightly to between 27 and 30 °C (81 and 86 °F) during the winter months. The hottest temperatures are observed just prior to the onset of the wet season, often rising above 35 °C (95 °F).

Climate data for Flores (Mundo Maya International Airport) (1991–2020)
Month	Jan	Feb	Mar	Apr	May	Jun	Jul	Aug	Sep	Oct	Nov	Dec	Year
Record high °C (°F)	37.0 (98.6)	38.6 (101.5)	42.4 (108.3)	43.0 (109.4)	43.8 (110.8)	42.4 (108.3)	38.2 (100.8)	38.4 (101.1)	38.0 (100.4)	38.8 (101.8)	35.6 (96.1)	36.6 (97.9)	43.8 (110.8)
Mean daily maximum °C (°F)	29.0 (84.2)	31.1 (88.0)	33.5 (92.3)	35.9 (96.6)	36.0 (96.8)	34.4 (93.9)	33.8 (92.8)	33.8 (92.8)	33.4 (92.1)	31.9 (89.4)	30.0 (86.0)	29.2 (84.6)	32.7 (90.9)
Daily mean °C (°F)	24.6 (76.3)	25.4 (77.7)	26.5 (79.7)	27.9 (82.2)	28.2 (82.8)	27.5 (81.5)	27.1 (80.8)	27.1 (80.8)	26.9 (80.4)	26.4 (79.5)	25.3 (77.5)	24.7 (76.5)	26.5 (79.7)
Mean daily minimum °C (°F)	18.0 (64.4)	18.1 (64.6)	18.7 (65.7)	20.6 (69.1)	22.0 (71.6)	22.6 (72.7)	21.8 (71.2)	21.8 (71.2)	22.1 (71.8)	21.6 (70.9)	19.8 (67.6)	18.7 (65.7)	20.5 (68.9)
Record low °C (°F)	9.4 (48.9)	9.0 (48.2)	9.8 (49.6)	13.8 (56.8)	14.7 (58.5)	19.4 (66.9)	17.9 (64.2)	18.4 (65.1)	18.6 (65.5)	15.6 (60.1)	10.4 (50.7)	10.0 (50.0)	9.0 (48.2)
Average precipitation mm (inches)	65.6 (2.58)	34.5 (1.36)	36.1 (1.42)	51.9 (2.04)	105.0 (4.13)	212.8 (8.38)	159.1 (6.26)	184.4 (7.26)	225.0 (8.86)	215.6 (8.49)	132.6 (5.22)	85.9 (3.38)	1,508.5 (59.39)
Average precipitation days (≥ 1.0 mm)	8.1	4.5	3.8	3.5	7.5	15.2	14.9	16.2	17.4	15.2	11.0	9.4	126.7
Source: NOAA

== Transportation ==
Flores is served by Mundo Maya International Airport with flights to Guatemala City's La Aurora International Airport. The Island is also very well connected by bus, with many companies running overnight buses to Guatemala City and other destinations.

== Gallery ==
=== 19th century ===
The first photographs ever made from Flores were those taken by engineer Claudio Urrutia in 1897, when he was in charge of the Guatemala-Mexico Border Commission.

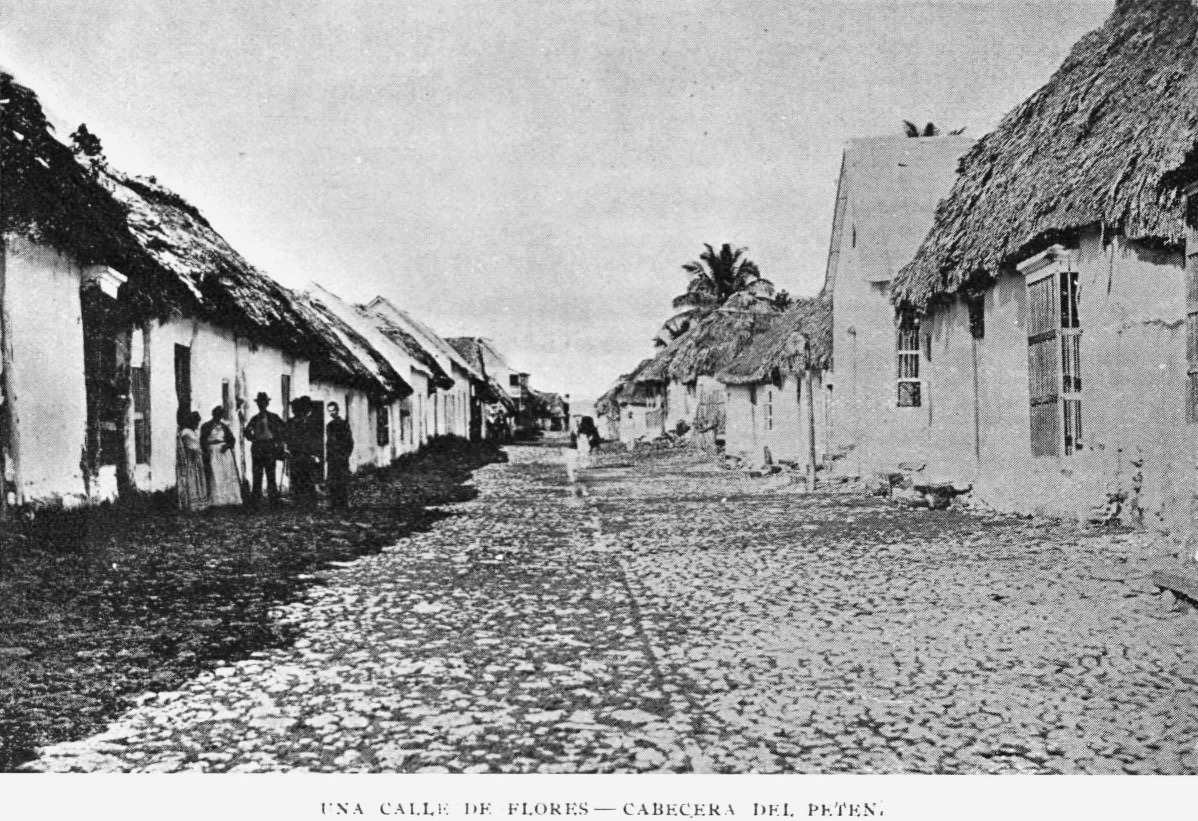

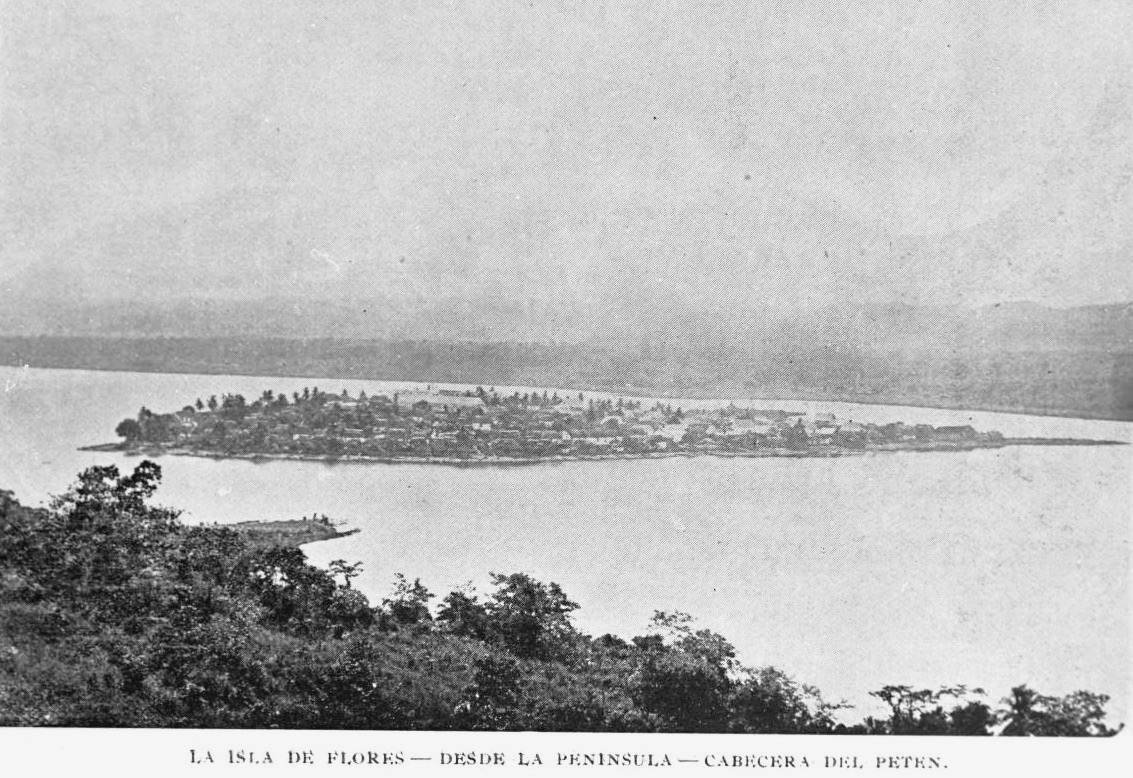

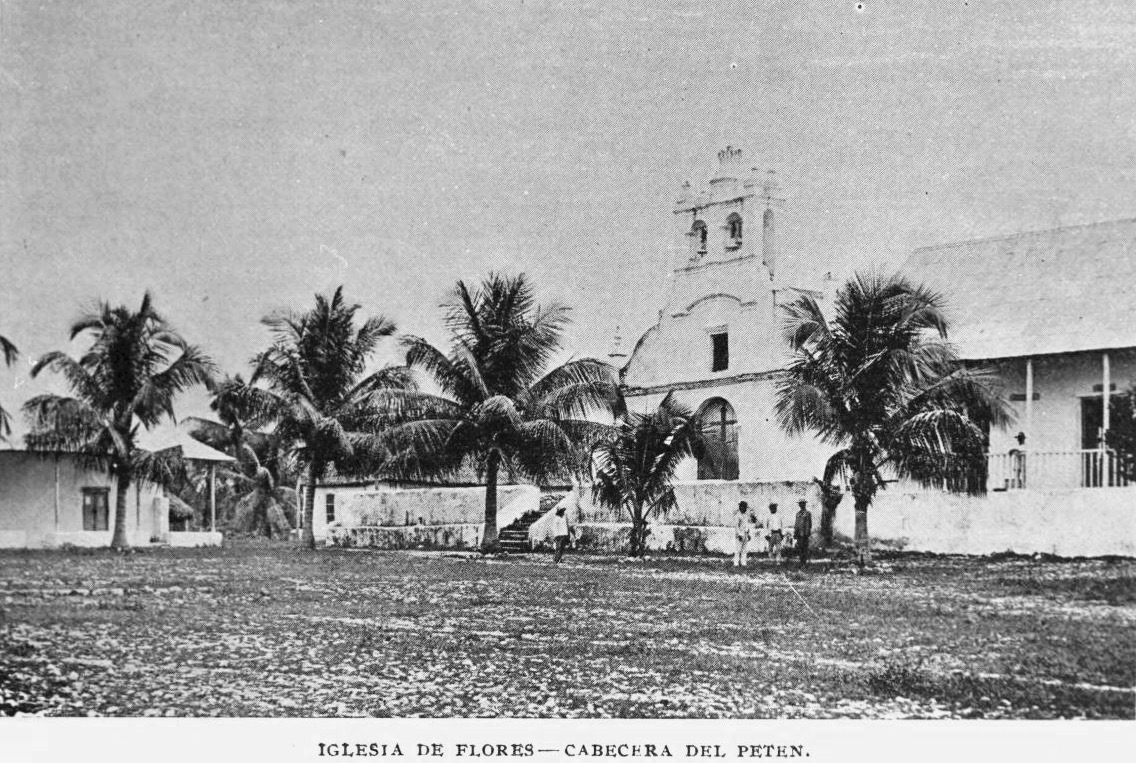

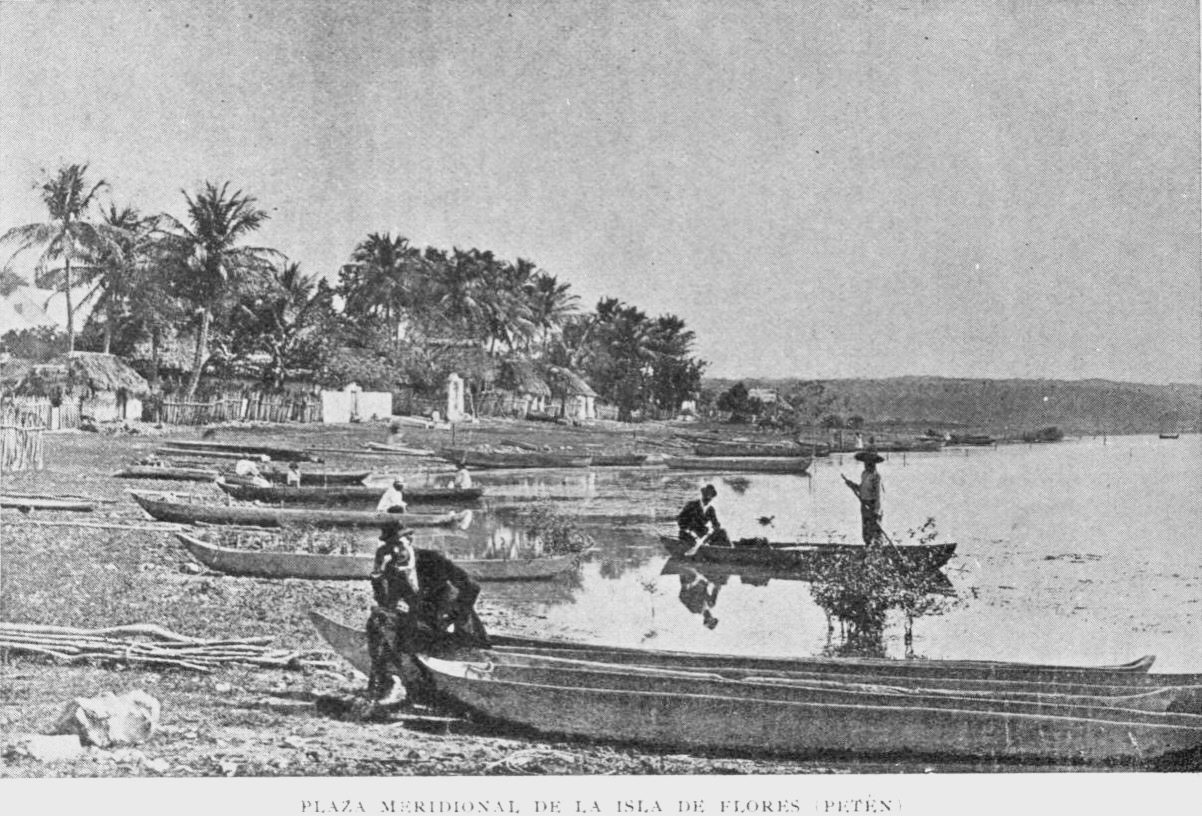

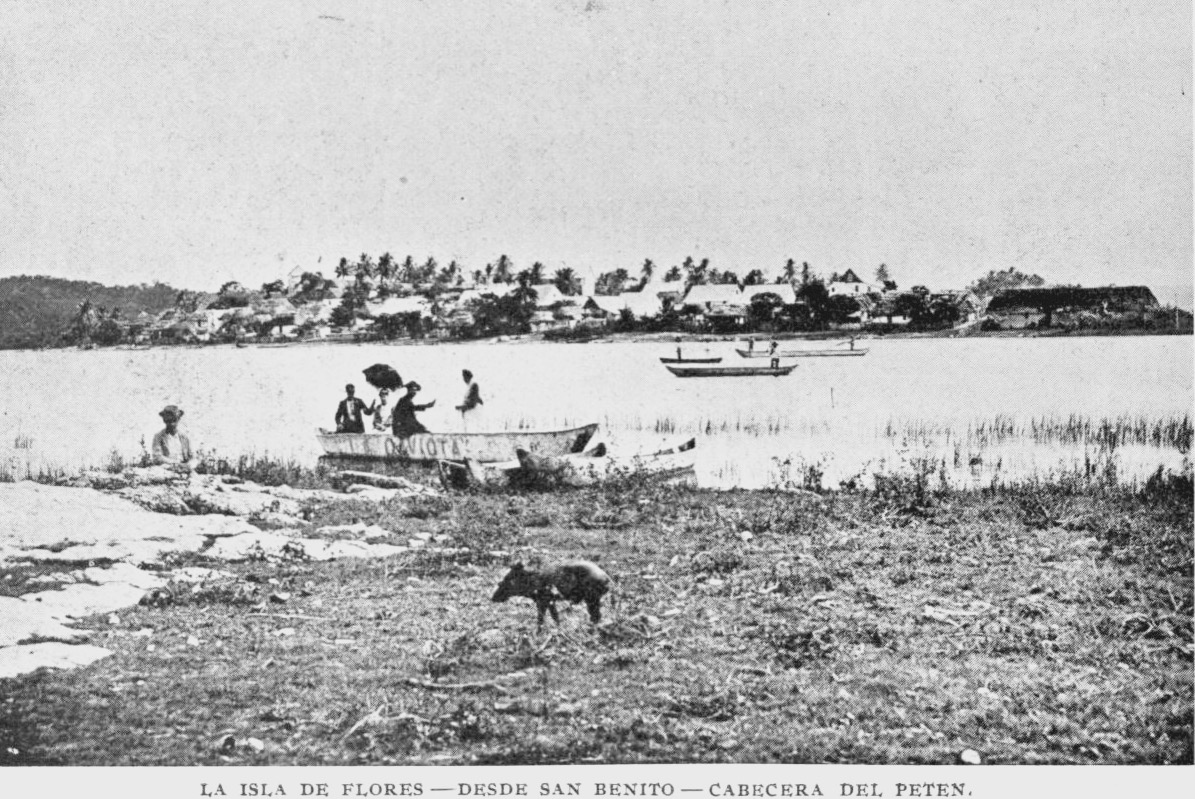
Flores, as seen from San Benito

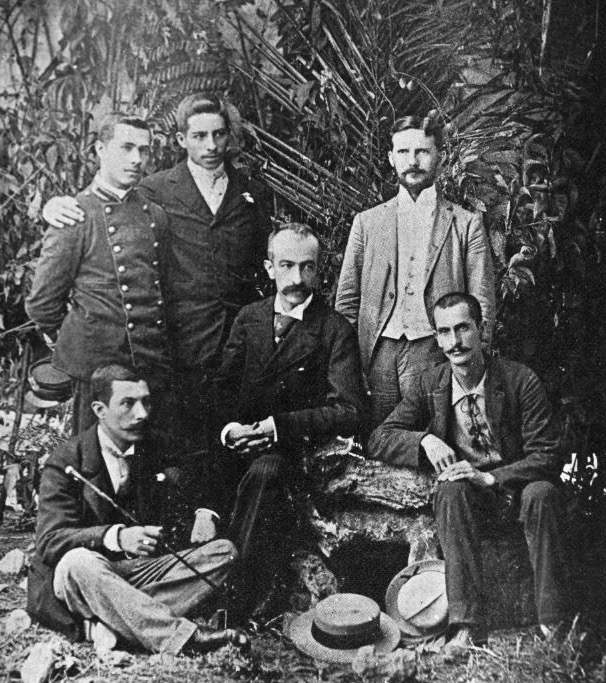
Engineering crew of the Guatemalan Border Commission. Claudio Urrutia, Commission Director is in the middle.

=== 21st century ===
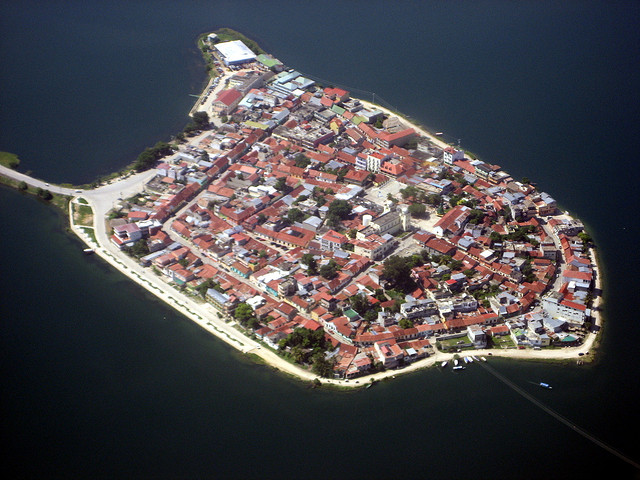
Aerial view of Flores Island from above Santa Elena.

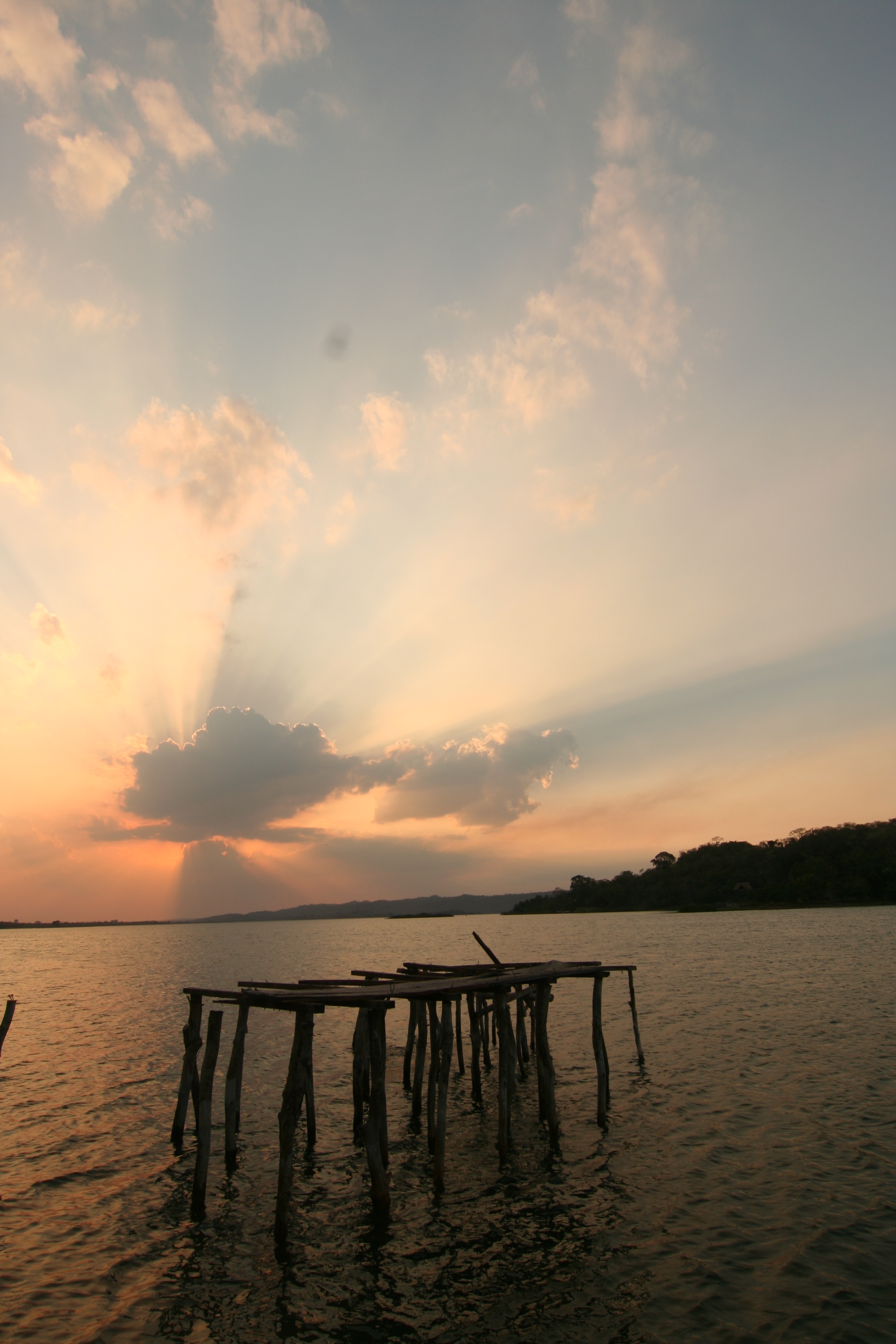
Sunset in Flores.

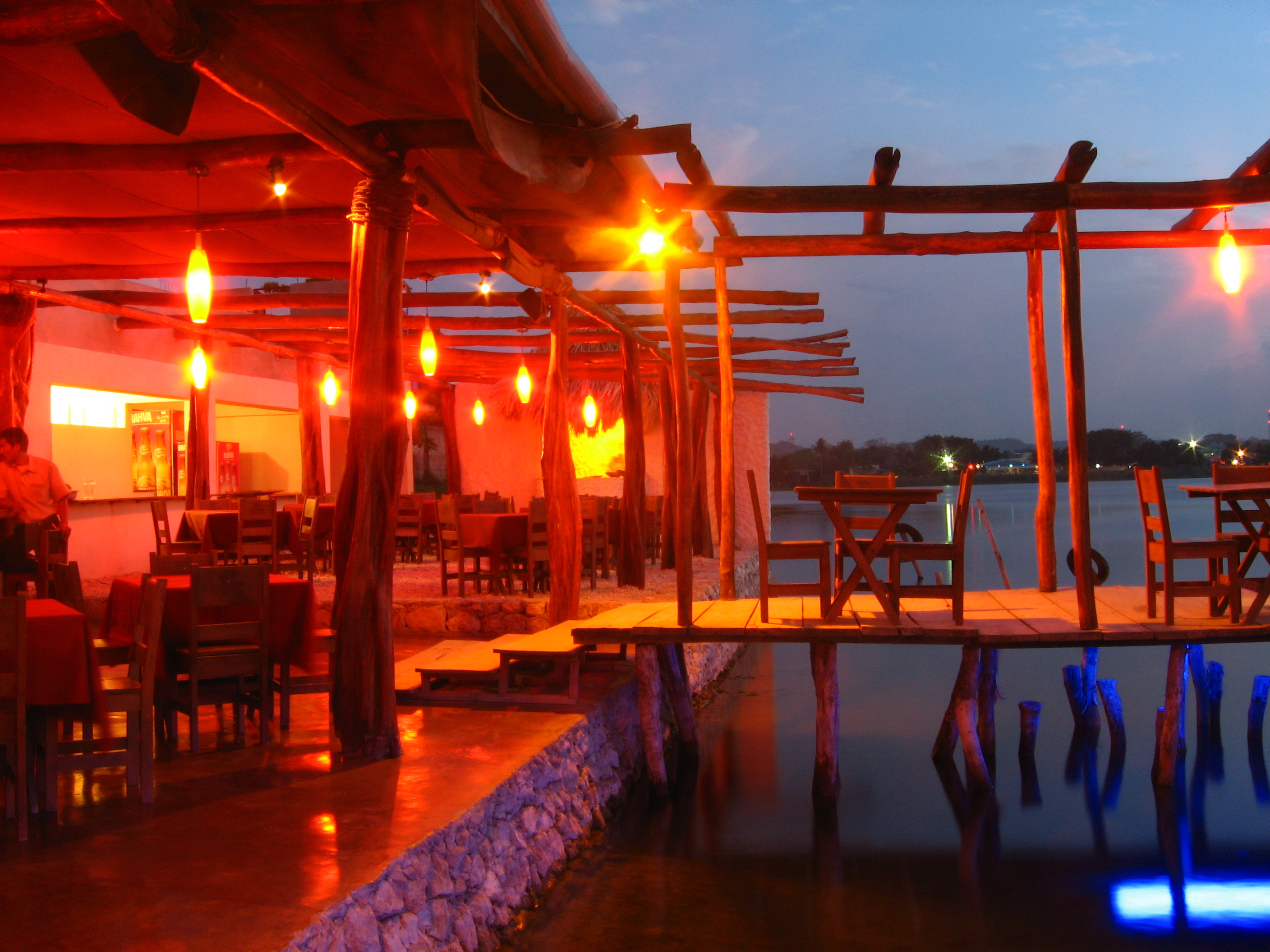
Restaurant on Lake Petén Itza.

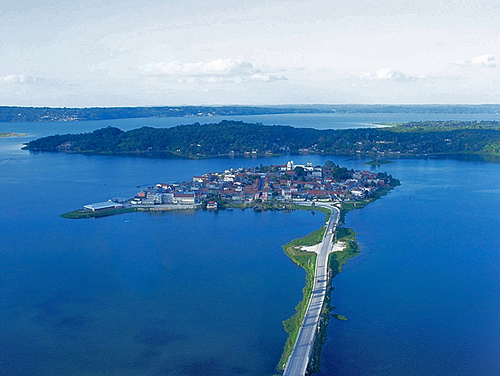
Causeway connecting the island.

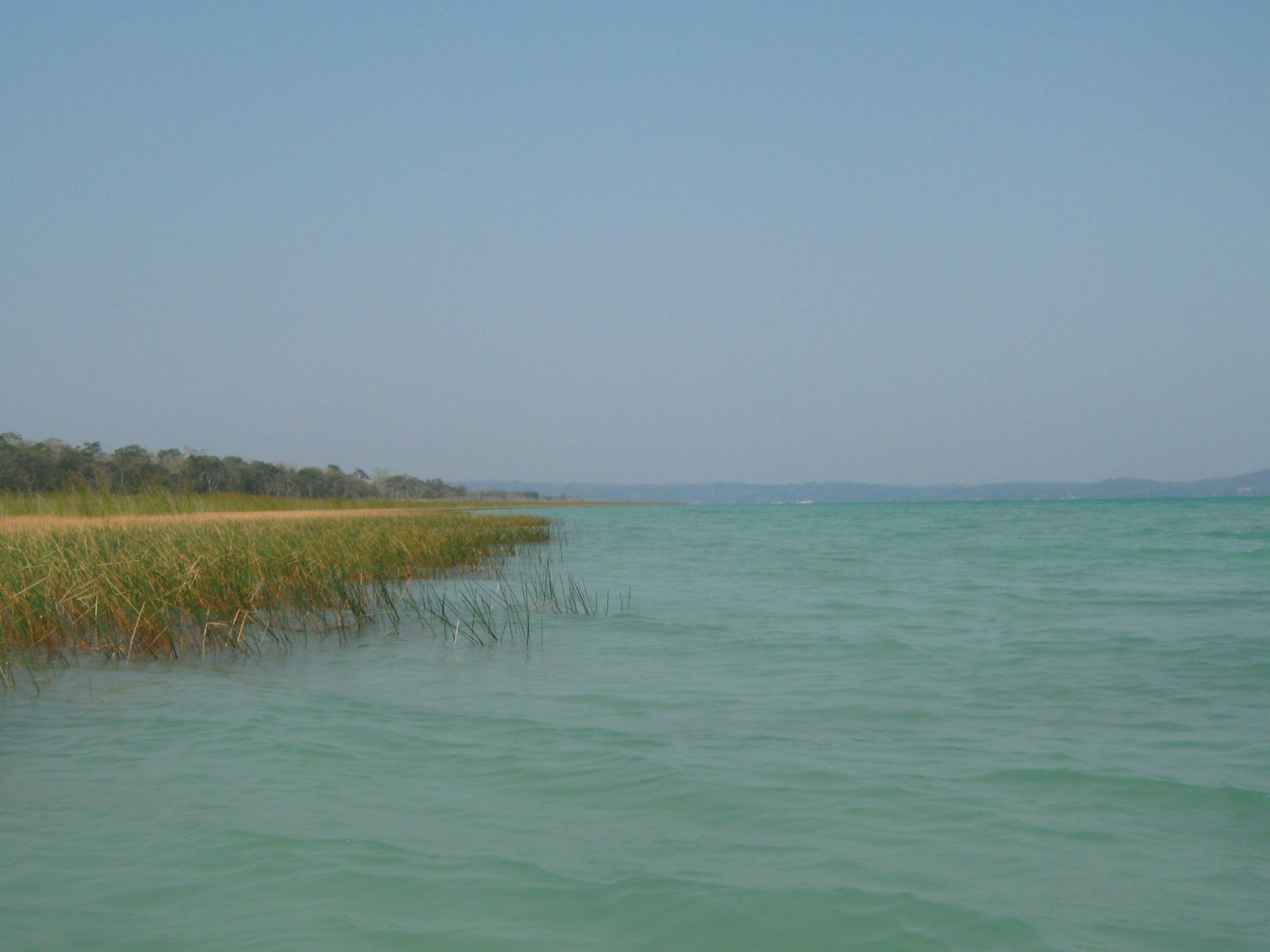
Shore of Lake Petén Itza.

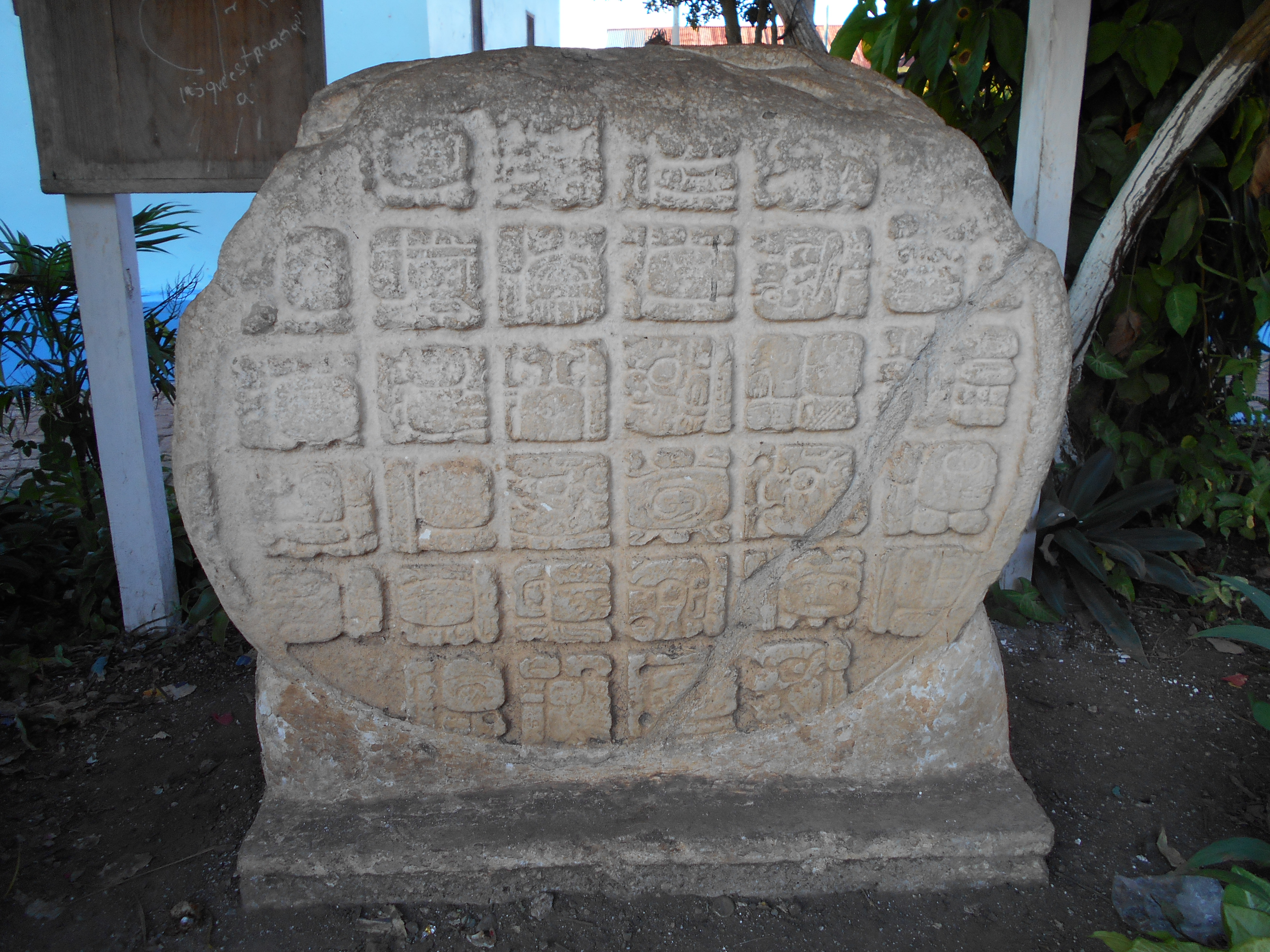
Classic period panel in the main plaza of Flores found in the nearby site of Ixlu.

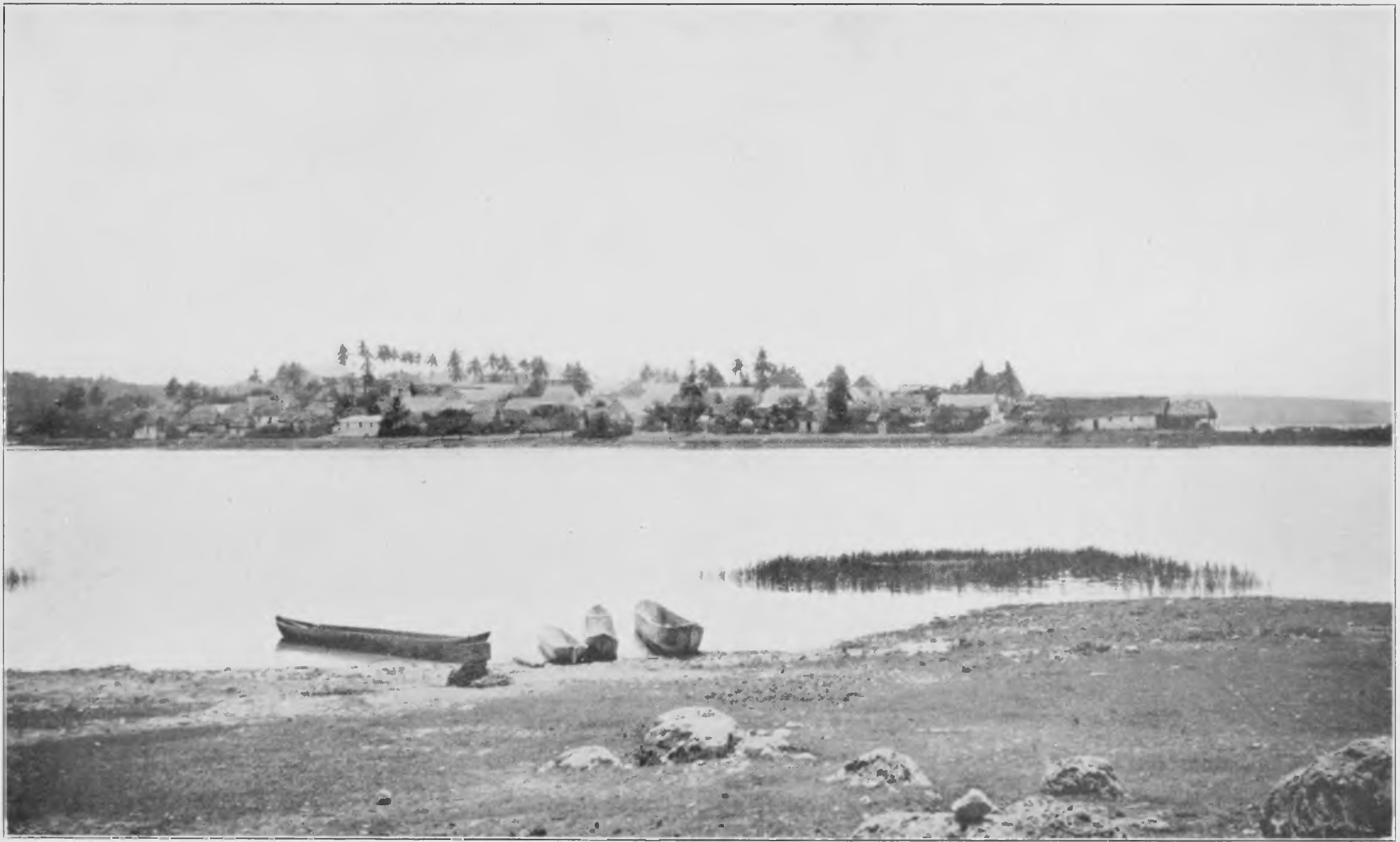
The island in 1917.

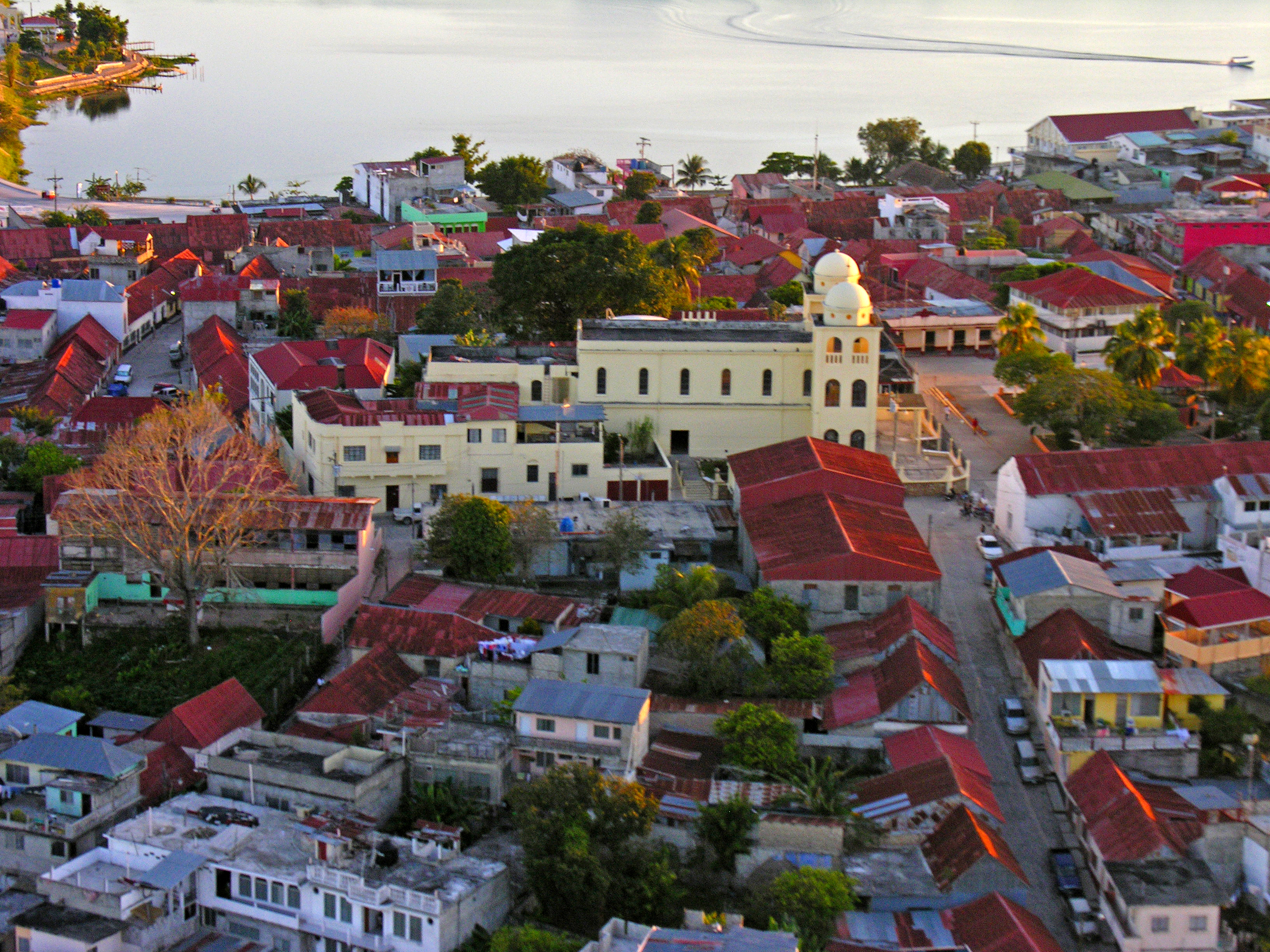
Aerial view of the City.

== See also ==
- Spanish conquest of Petén
- Spanish conquest of Guatemala
- Spanish conquest of Yucatán

== Bibliography ==
- "Nuestros grabados: Límites con México". La Ilustración Guatemalteca (in Spanish). I (18). Guatemala: Síguere, Guirola & Cía. 1 April 1897.
- Reina, Ruben E. (Fall 1966). "A Peninsula That May Have Been an Island: Tayasal, Peten, Guatemala" (PDF). Expedition. 9 (1). Philadelphia, Pennsylvania, USA: University of Pennsylvania Museum of Archaeology and Anthropology. ISSN 0014-4738. Archived from the original (PDF) on 2023-05-17.
- Rice, Prudence M. (2009). "The Kowoj in Geopolitical-Ritual Perspective". In Prudence M. Rice; Don S. Rice (eds.). The Kowoj: identity, migration, and geopolitics in late postclassic Petén, Guatemala. Boulder, Colorado, US: University Press of Colorado. pp. 21–54. ISBN 978-0-87081-930-8. OCLC 225875268.
