= Velo =

Velo or Vélo may refer to:

- A bicycle, a two-wheeled, single-track vehicle

== People ==
- Boldklubben Velo, Danish footballer
- Carlos Velo (1909–1988), Spanish film director
- Christian Nestor Velo, Malagasy politician
- Maks Velo (1935–2020), Albanian painter, journalist and architect
- Marco Velo (born 1974), Italian cyclist
- Michael Velo (1851–1929), Norwegian businessperson and politician
- Nicolae Velo (1882–1924), Aromanian poet and diplomat in Romania

== Publications ==
- Le Vélo, French sports newspaper
- Vélo Magazine, an Éditions Philippe Amaury publication

== Other uses ==
- Velo, Greece, a town in Greece
- Velo (nicotine pouches), nicotine pouch
- VeloBind, binding
- Benz Velo, automobile
- Philips Velo, handheld PC
- Velo-, prefix form of velum (soft palate), such as in velocardiofacial syndrome
