= Avianca Guatemala =

Guatemalan airline

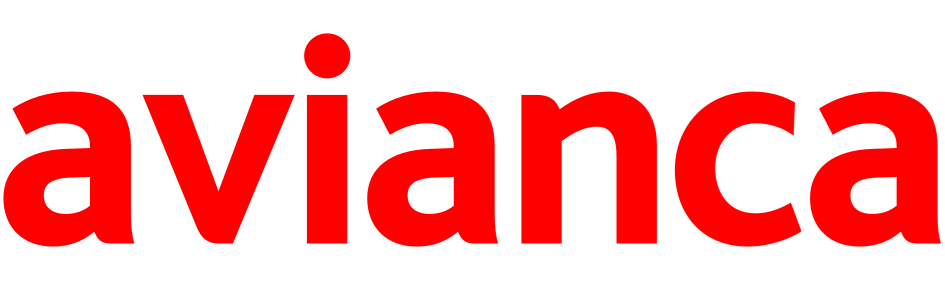

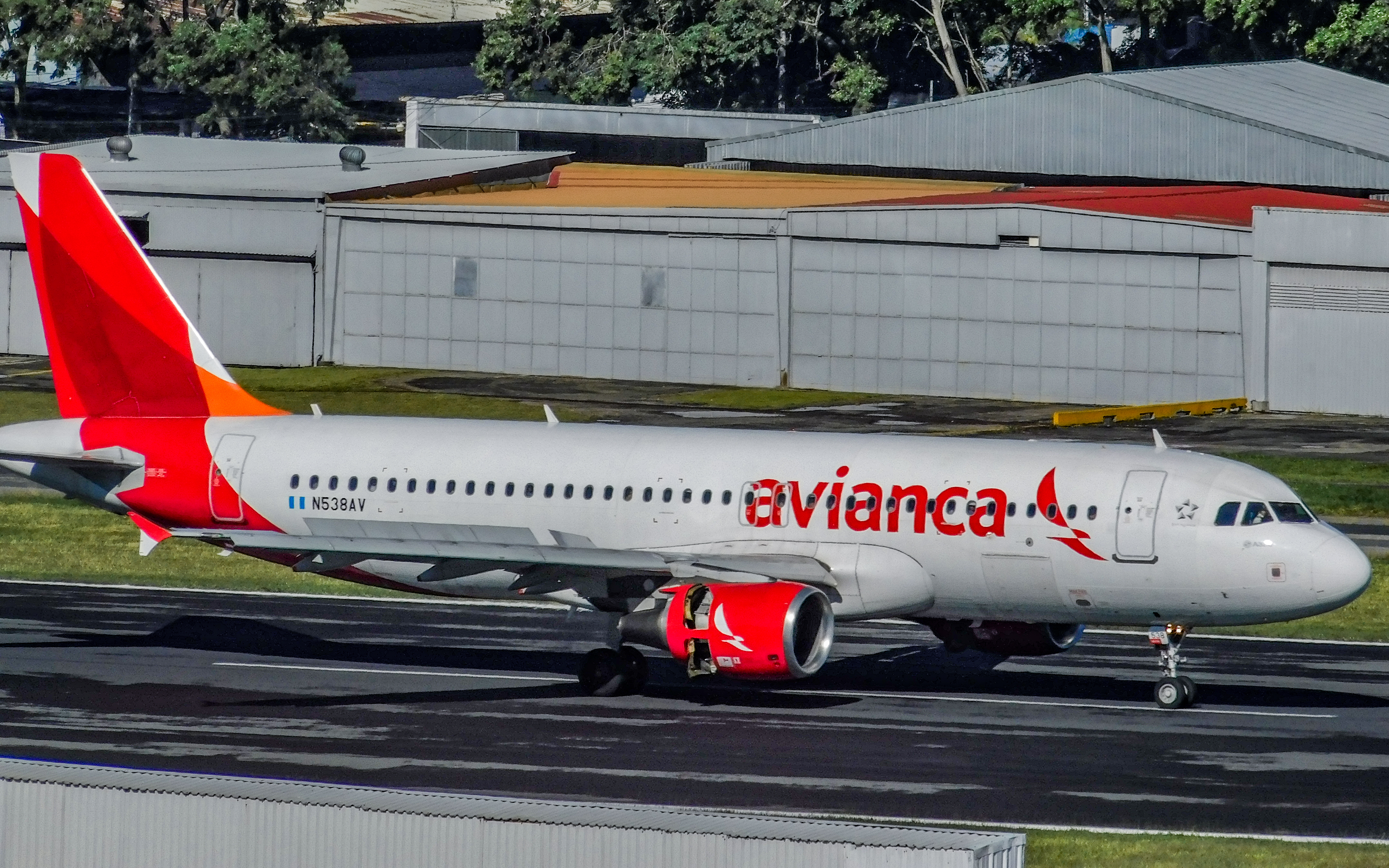
- Avianca Guatemala (Aviateca) Airbus A320-214
IATA	ICAO	Call sign
GU	GUG	AVIATECA
- Founded: 1929 (as Aerovías de Guatemala); March 14, 1945 (as Aviateca)
- Hubs: La Aurora International Airport
- Focus cities: Mundo Maya International Airport
- Frequent-flyer program: LifeMiles
- Alliance: Star Alliance (affiliate)
- Fleet size: 4
- Destinations: 9
- Parent company: Avianca Group
- Headquarters: Guatemala City, Guatemala
- Key people: Frederico Pedreira (CEO)
- Founder: Alfredo Denby Chattfield
- Employees: 82
- Website: avianca.com

Aviateca S.A. branded Avianca Guatemala is a regional airline headquartered in Guatemala City that serves as the flag carrier of Guatemala. Aviateca was under government ownership and remained so until 1989 when it joined the Grupo TACA alliance of Central America and was privatized. It was fully integrated into TACA, operating under the TACA Regional banner, which later merged with Avianca.

== History ==
The airline was established in 1929 as Aerovías de Guatemala and was founded by Alfredo Denby Chattfield. In March 14, 1945, the airline was nationalized during the government of Juan José Arévalo and established as Empresa Guatemalteca de Aviación S.A. which was shortened to Aviateca. One of the original founders was Alfredo Castaneda Duarte who also served as a pilot. Aviateca started operations in March 1946 and early aircraft operated by the carrier including the Douglas DC-3.

In 1961, service to Miami was originated with four-engined Douglas DC-6 airliners. The airline later operated the Douglas DC-6B version as well. Convair CV-240 family airliners were also acquired to replace some of the DC-3s on short-haul routes in Latin America.

Aviateca introduced jet service as a customer for the BAC One-Eleven medium twin jet in 1970. In 1974, the airline was operating the stretched BAC One-Eleven series 500 version of the British-manufactured jet on international flights to Miami, New Orleans, Mexico City, Mérida and San Jose, Costa Rica. The airline's fleet was referred to by locals as "Las Papayas Voladoras" (The Flying Papayas) due to the paint scheme used during the 1970s, in which the underbelly was painted a reddish orange. It also temporarily leased a Fokker F28 Fellowship, some Boeing 720s and a Douglas DC-8-61. Aviateca later acquired two Boeing 727-100s, which operated for the airline in the 1980s. From 1989 on, Aviateca's fleet consisted of several Boeing 737-200 and Boeing 737-300 jetliners, including a full cargo 737-300 that operated for a few months.

Between 2006 and 2007, Aviateca operated a few Airbus A319s with the TACA-style Aviateca logo on the engines. Five of TACA's ATR 42-300s were registered for Aviateca in Guatemala. Due to reorganization measures at Avianca Holdings, Aviateca was renamed Avianca Guatemala in 2013.

On May 10, 2020, Avianca filed for Chapter 11 bankruptcy in the United States after failing to pay bondholders, becoming one of the major airlines to file for bankruptcy due to the COVID-19 pandemic crisis.

In March 2021, the airline terminated all destinations and transferred its operations to Avianca. However, in October 2022, Avianca Group announced that it would reactivate Avianca Guatemala's operations by December 2022.

== Destinations ==
This is a list of destinations of served by both Aviateca and Avianca Guatemala throughout their existence.

Country	City	Airport	Notes	Refs
Belize	Belize City	Philip S. W. Goldson International Airport	Terminated	
Colombia	Bogotá	El Dorado International Airport		
Colombia	San Andrés	Gustavo Rojas Pinilla International Airport	Terminated	
El Salvador	San Salvador	El Salvador International Airport		
El Salvador	San Salvador	Ilopango International Airport	Terminated	
Guatemala	Flores	Mundo Maya International Airport	Focus city	
Guatemala	Guatemala City	La Aurora International Airport	Hub	
Guatemala	Puerto Barrios	Puerto Barrios Airport	Terminated	
Guatemala	Quetzaltenango	Quetzaltenango Airport	Terminated	
Guatemala	Uaxactun	Uaxactun Airport	Terminated	
Honduras	Comayagua	Comayagua International Airport		
Honduras	Roatán	Juan Manuel Gálvez International Airport	Terminated	
Honduras	San Pedro Sula	Ramón Villeda Morales International Airport		
Honduras	Tegucigalpa	Toncontín International Airport	Terminated	
Mexico	Cancún	Cancún International Airport		
Mexico	Merida	Mérida-Rejón Airport	Terminated	
Mexico	Mexico City	Mexico City International Airport	Terminated	
Nicaragua	Managua	Augusto C. Sandino International Airport	Terminated	
Panama	Panama City	Tocumen International Airport	Terminated	
United States	Chicago	O'Hare International Airport		
United States	Houston	George Bush Intercontinental Airport	Terminated	
United States	Los Angeles	Los Angeles International Airport		
United States	Miami	Miami International Airport	Terminated	
United States	New Orleans	Louis Armstrong New Orleans International Airport	Terminated	

== Fleet ==
=== Current fleet ===
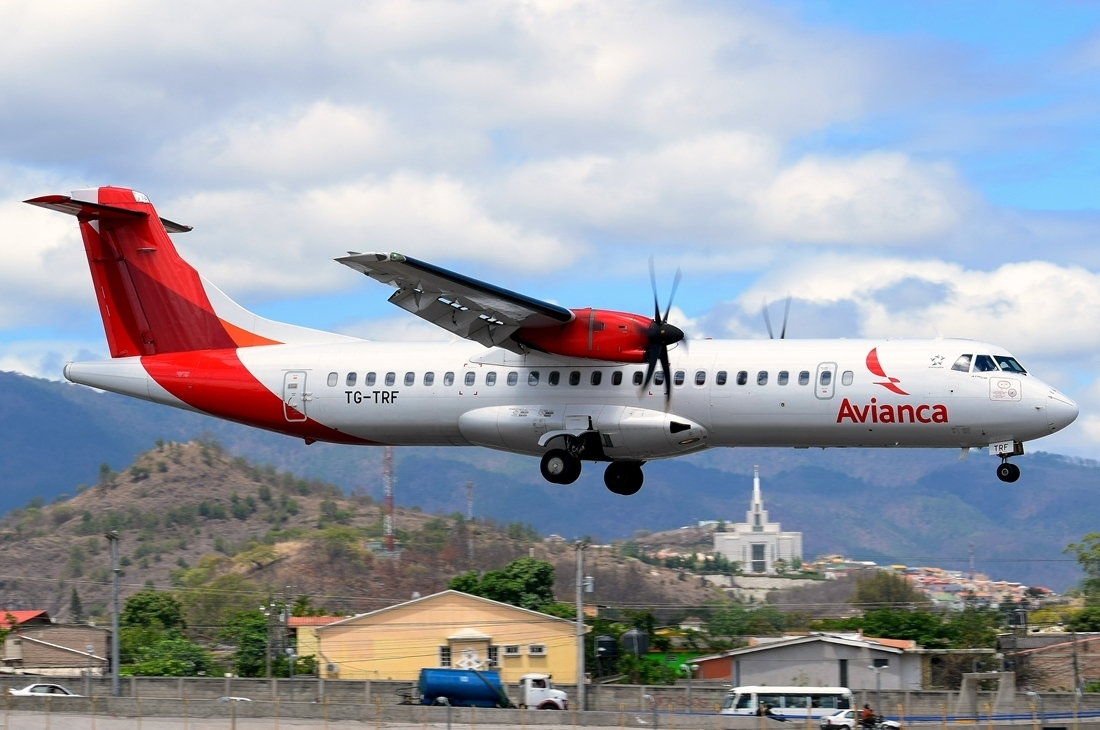
A former Avianca Guatemala ATR 72-600 landing at Toncontín International Airport in 2018

As of July 2026, Aviianca Guatemala operates the following aircraft:

Avianca Guatemala fleet
Aircraft	In service	Orders	Passengers				Notes
Aircraft	In service	Orders	W	Y+	Y	Total	Notes
Airbus A320-200	4	—	12	60	108	180	
Total	4	—					

=== Former fleet ===
As of August 2025, Avianca Guatemala operated 1 Airbus A320

Throughout its operations, the airline operated these aircraft:

Aviateca former fleet
Aircraft	Total	Introduced	Retired	Notes
Airbus A319-100	2	2006	2007	Operated by TACA Airlines
ATR 42-300QC	3	2006	2017	
ATR 72-600	4	2014	2021	
BAC One-Eleven Series 500	4	1970	1980	
Boeing 720	3	1977	1979	
Boeing 727-100C	4	1979	1989	
Boeing 737-200	12	1990	2004	One written off as Flight 901
Boeing 737-300	9	1989	1996	
Convair CV-440	4	1954	1979	
Curtiss C-46 Commando	6	1949	1975	
Douglas C-47 Skytrain	11	1945	1981	
Douglas C-54 Skymaster	2	1954	1970	
Douglas DC-2	2	1945	1952	
Douglas DC-6	10	1965	1984	
Douglas DC-8-61	1	1988	1989	Leased from Trans International Airlines
Fairchild C-82 Packet	5	1957	1961	
Fokker F-27 Friendship	3	1978	1987	
Fokker F-28 Fellowship	1	1974	1976	Leased from Fokker
Hawker Siddeley HS 748	1	1975	1975	Leased from Midwest Aviation
Lockheed L-1049 Super Constellation	1	1972	1972	

== Aviateca photo gallery ==
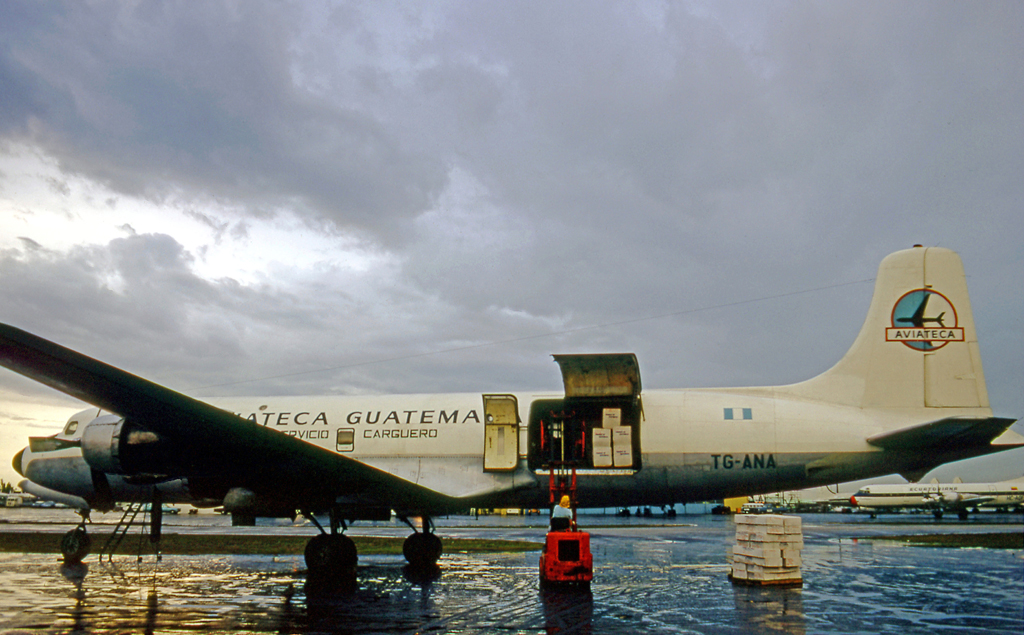
A Douglas DC-6A at Miami International Airport in 1971

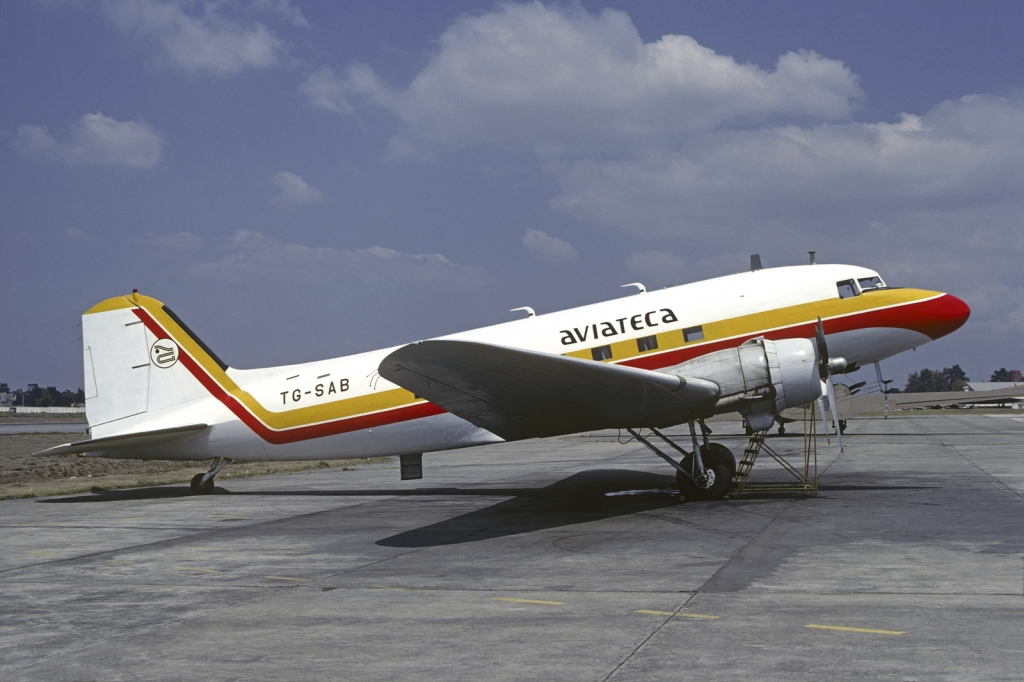
A Douglas DC-3

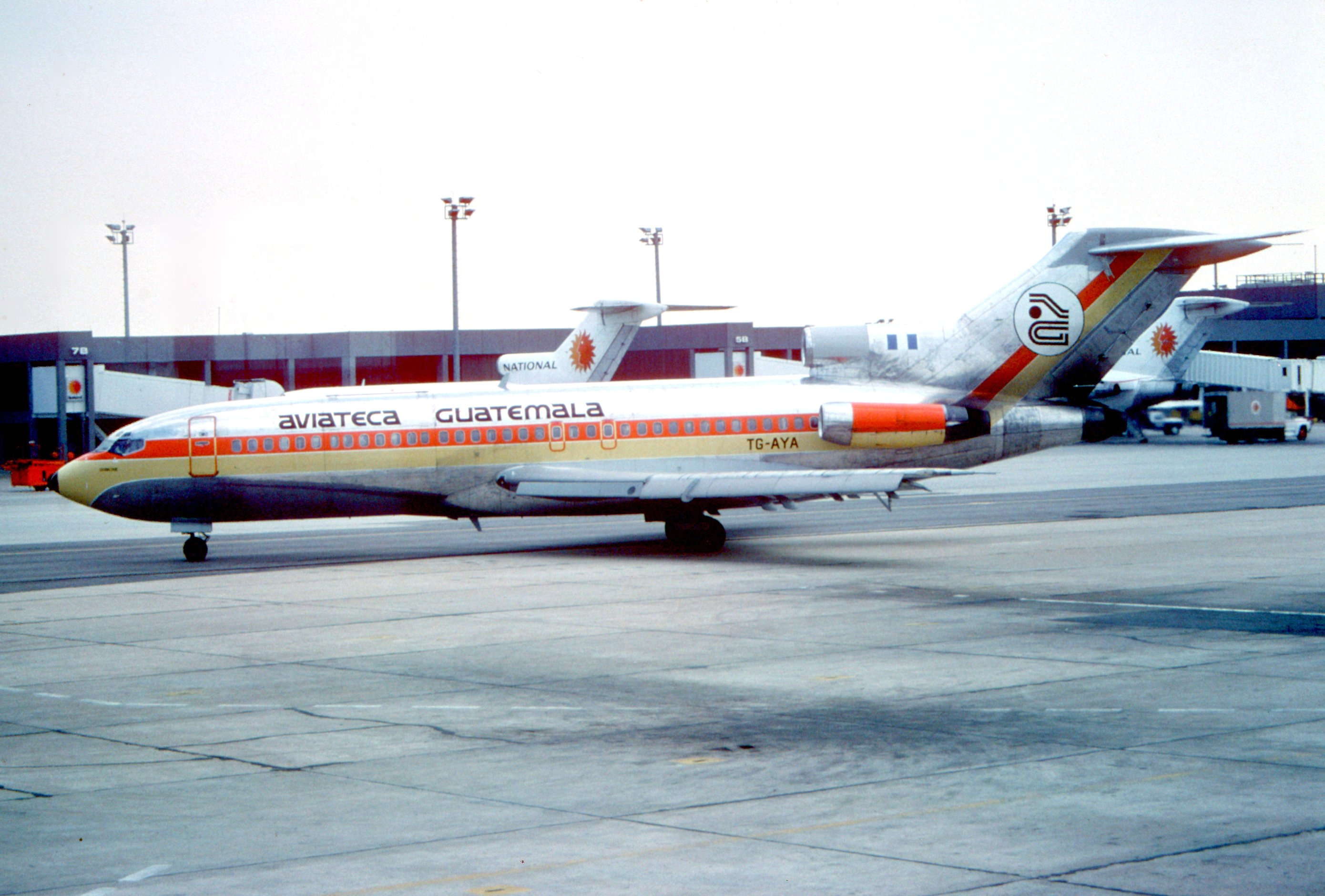
A Boeing 727-100 in the "Flying Papaya" livery in 1980

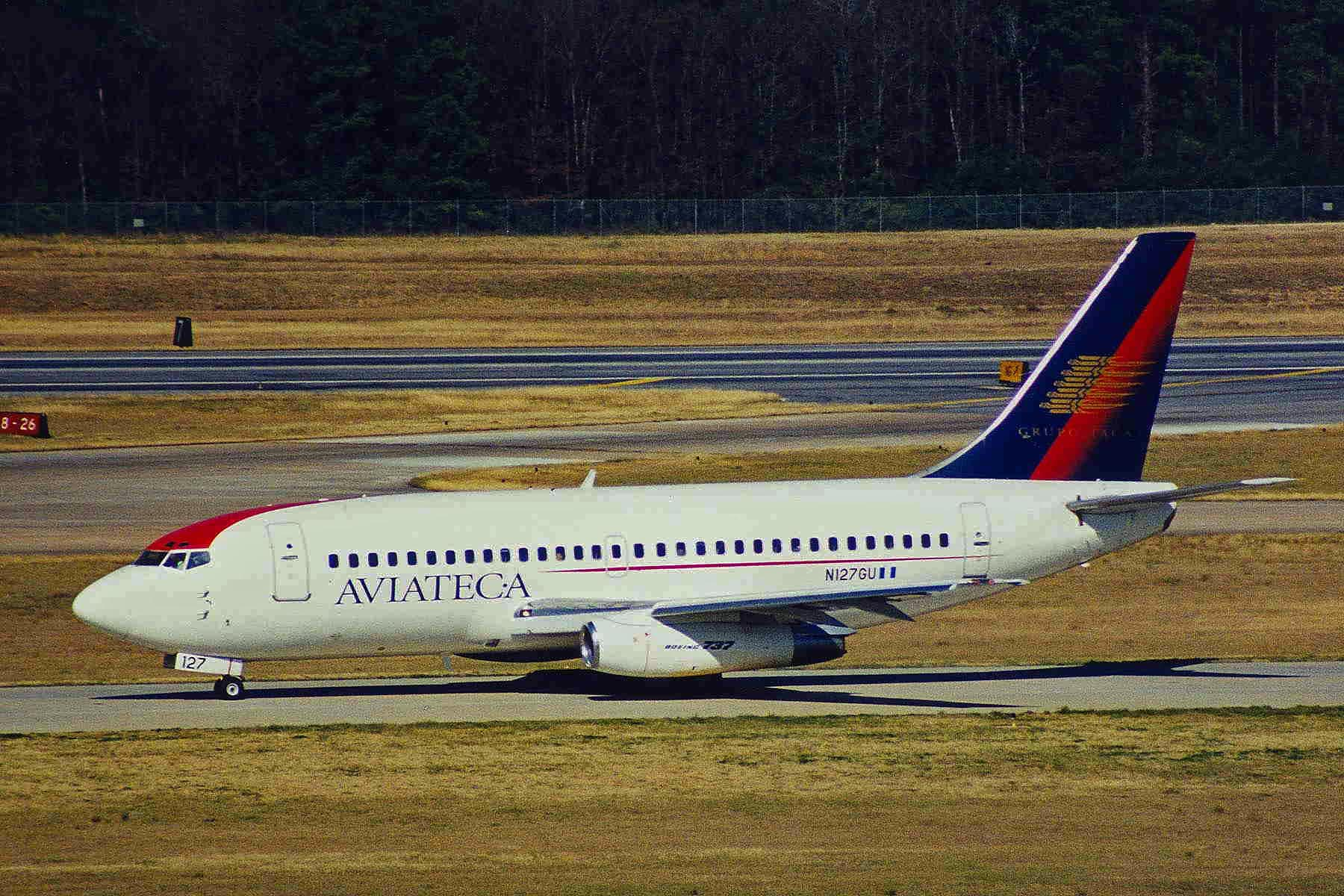
A Boeing 737-200 in hybrid Aviateca/TACA colors in January 1999

== Accidents and incidents ==
- On 15 December, 1953, Curtiss C-46 Commando (registered TG-AQA) cargo flight crashed in the Cerro Tecpán mountains within Tecpán, killing the 2 pilots onboard.
- On May 24, 1956, Douglas C-47A (registered TG-AHA) crashed in the Sierra de las Minas mountains, near Río Hondo, all but one of the 31 occupants were killed.
- On May 11, 1971, Curtiss C-46 Commando (registered TG-ACA) crashed into a hill shortly after takeoff from La Aurora International Airport, Guatemala City, killing 5 out of 32 occupants onboard.
- On February 17, 1975, Douglas C-47A (registered TG-AMA) was destroyed by fire at El Petén Airport, Tikal.
- On November 18, 1975, Douglas C-47 (registered TG-AGA) crashed within Petén Department whilst on a passenger flight from Uaxactun Airport to Flores International Airport, Santa Elena, 15 out of 22 occupants killed.
- On April 27, 1977, Convair CV-240 (registered TG-ACA) emergency landed near La Aurora International Airport, Guatemala City following engine failure, all 28 people on board survived.
- On September 30, 1977, Douglas C-47A (registered TG-AKA) was damaged beyond economic repair in a landing accident at Flores International Airport, Santa Elena. One of the three crew members was killed.
- On July 26, 1978, Douglas DC-3 (registered TG-AFA) overran the runway at Flores International Airport following a birdstrike on take-off and was reported to have been damaged beyond economic repair. The aircraft was later repaired and returned to service.

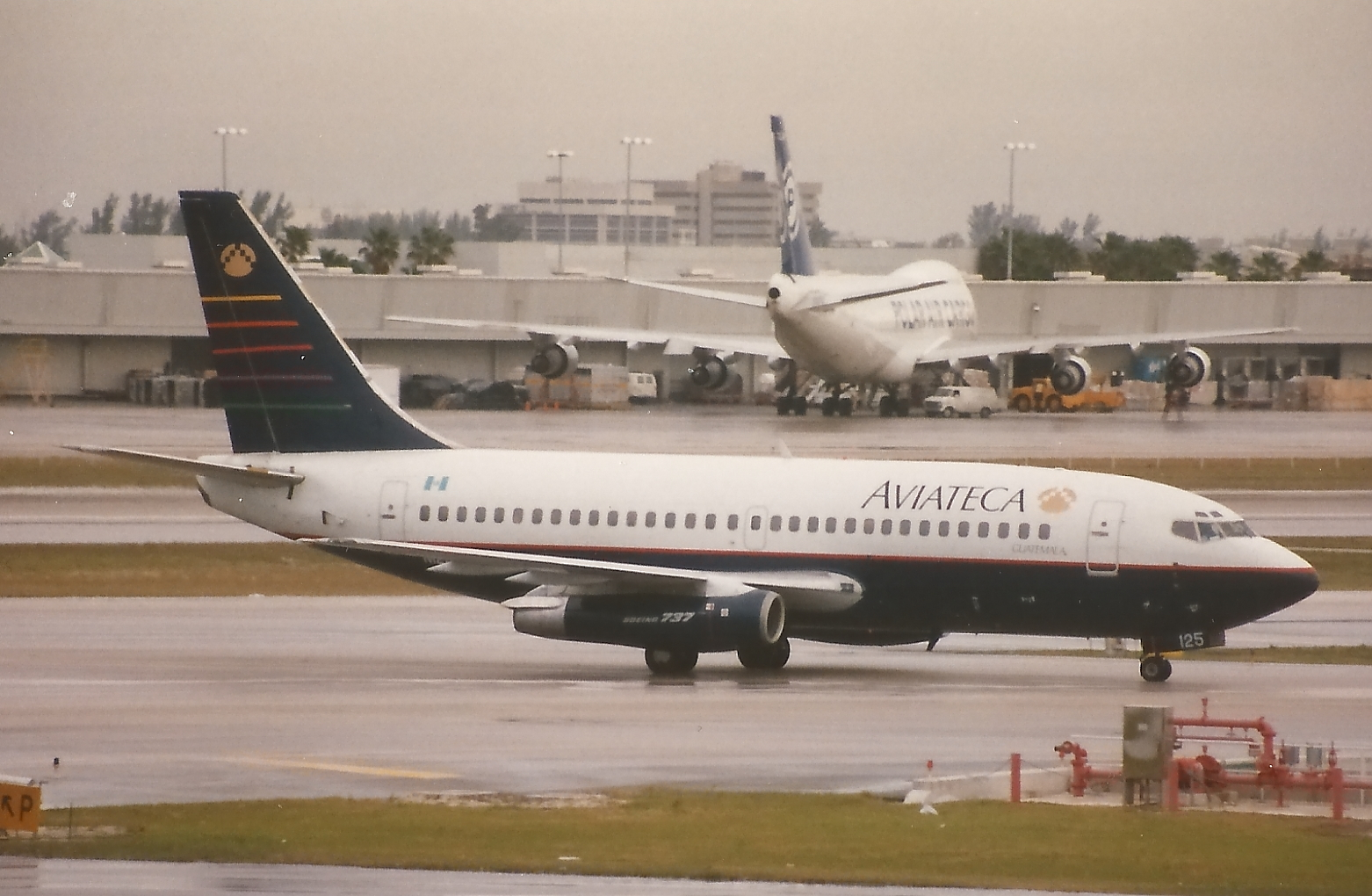
The aircraft that crashed as Flight 901 in 1995

- On August 9, 1995 (0214 UTC August 10, 1995), Aviateca Flight 901, a Boeing 737-200 (registered N125GU), collided with the side of the San Vicente (Chichontepec) volcano, 24 kilometres (15 mi) northeast of San Salvador International Airport, San Salvador. The aircraft was on an IFR flight plan from La Aurora International Airport to Comalapa International Airport. All 7 crew members and 58 passengers died on the crash. Severe weather existed at the time, and the aircraft had deviated from airway G436 to the north to avoid thunderstorms.

== See also ==
- List of airlines of Guatemala
