= UAX =

UAX may refer to

- Alfonso X El Sabio University in Madrid, Spain
- United Express, a brand of United Airlines
- Uaxactun Airport, Guatemala, IATA airport code
- Unicode Standard Annex
