= Avianca El Salvador =

Flag carrier of El Salvador

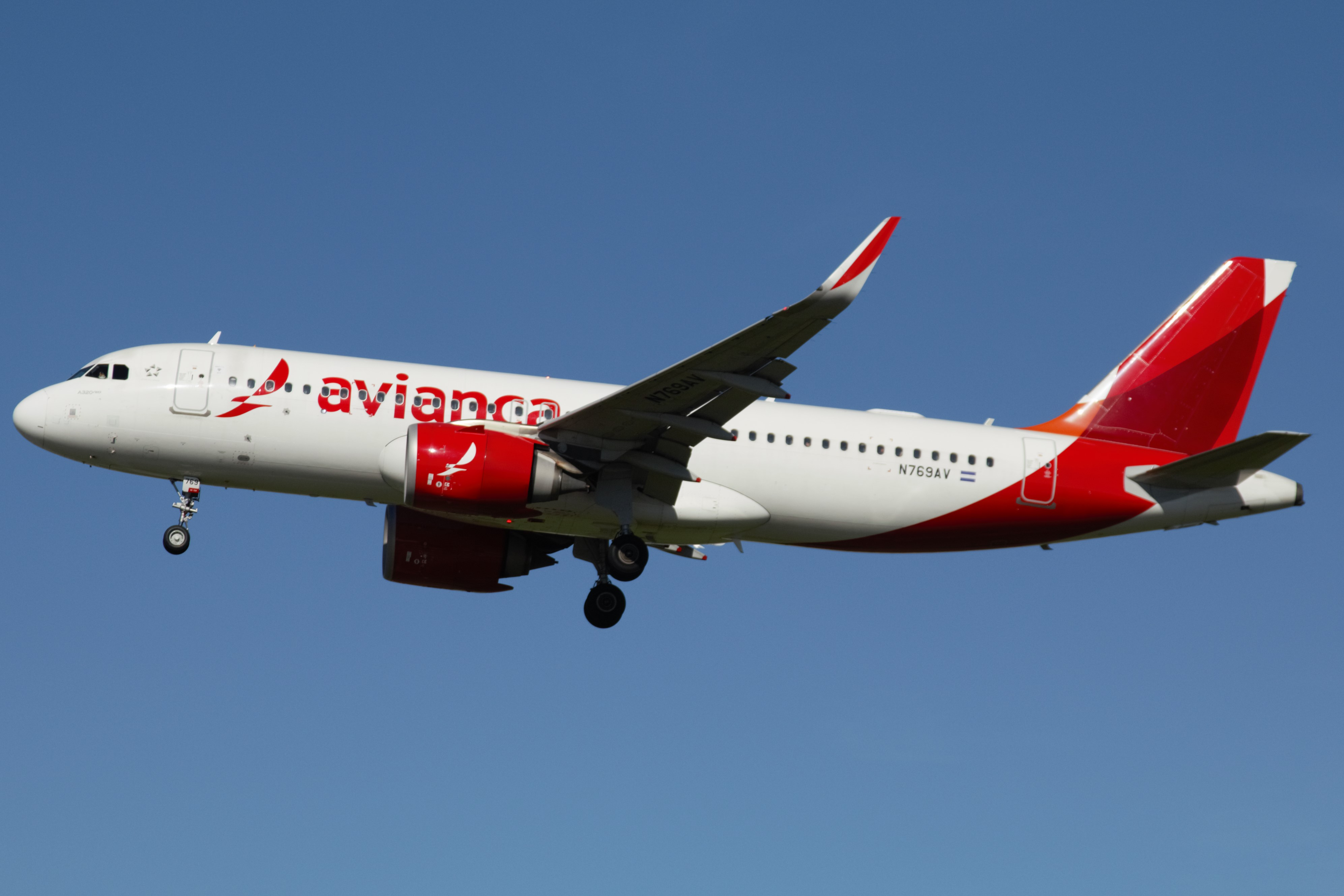
- Avianca El Salvador Airbus A320neo
IATA	ICAO	Call sign
AV	TAI	TACA
- Founded: 1931; 95 years ago (as TACA)
- AOC #: COA-002-TA
- Hubs: San Salvador
- Focus cities: San José (CR)
- Frequent-flyer program: LifeMiles
- Alliance: Star Alliance (affiliate)
- Fleet size: 19
- Destinations: 26
- Parent company: Avianca Group
- Headquarters: Antiguo Cuscatlán, El Salvador
- Key people: Frederico Pedreira (CEO of Avianca Group); David Alemán (Director)
- Founder: Lowell Yerex
- Employees: 2,000 (2022)
- Website: www.avianca.com

Transportes Aéreos del Continente Americano, S.A. (Spanish for "Air Transport of the American Continent"), known and formerly branded as TACA International Airlines, and operating as Avianca El Salvador, is an airline owned by Kingsland Holdings and based in San Salvador, El Salvador. It is one of the seven national branded airlines in the Avianca Group of Latin American airlines, and it serves as the flag carrier of El Salvador.

Founded in 1931, the airline owned and operated five other airlines in Central America. Its name was originally an acronym meaning Central American Air Transport (Transportes Aéreos Centroamericanos) but was later changed to Air Transport of the American Continent (Transportes Aéreos del Continente Americano) to reflect its expansion to North, Central, and South America.

On 7 October 2009, the airline announced that it would merge with the Colombian airline Avianca, however, it maintained the TACA name until the merger was officially completed on 21 May 2013. TACA is the second-oldest continuously operating airline brand in Central America and the Caribbean, after Cubana de Aviación.

== History ==
=== Inauguration (1931–1980) ===
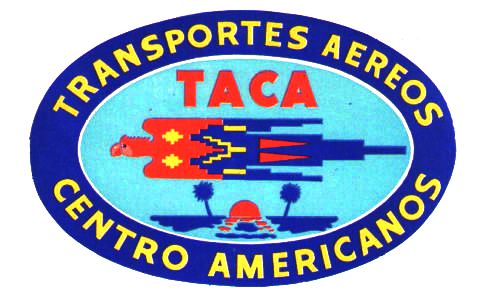
TACA's logo from 1936 to 1948

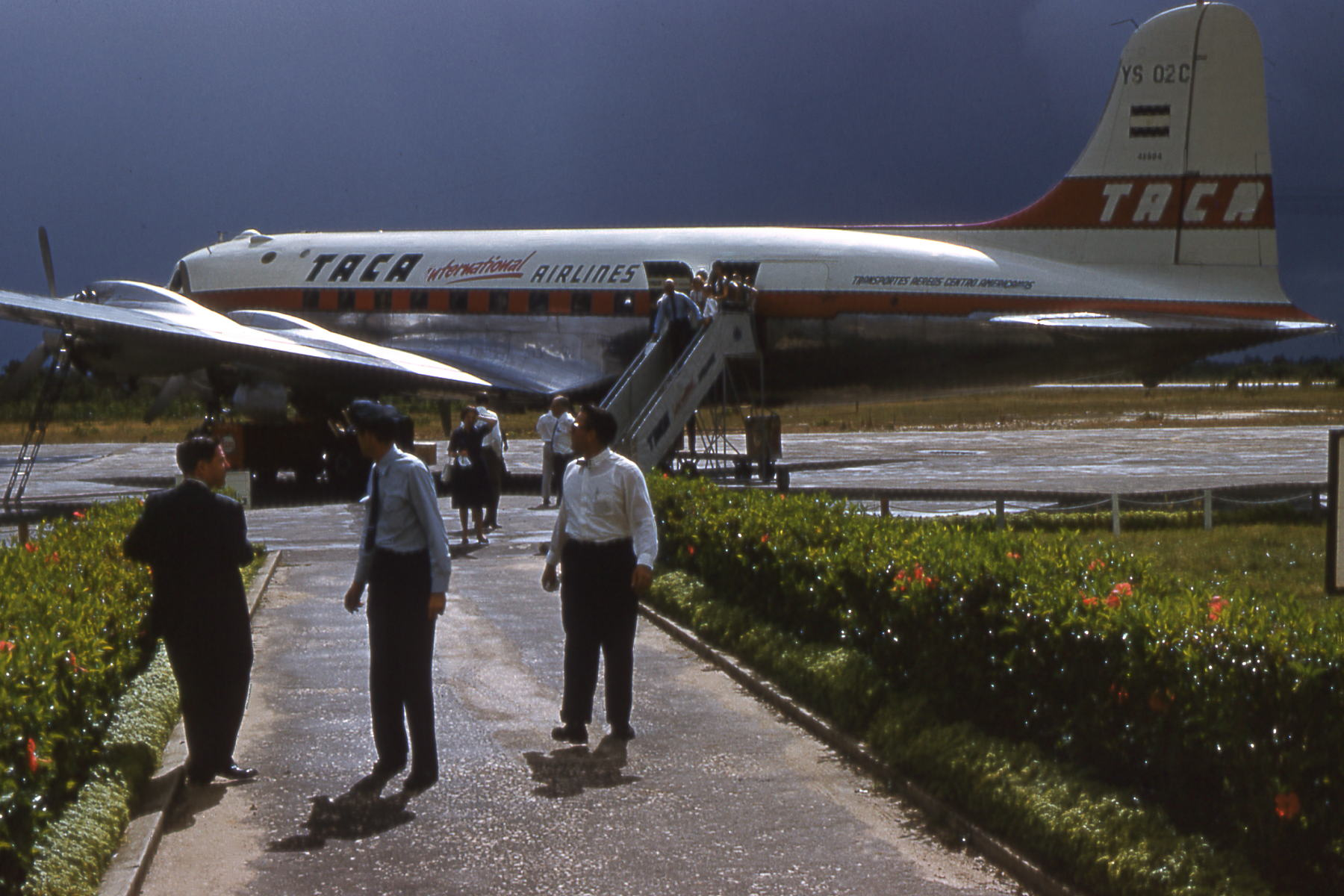
A TACA Douglas DC-4 in Tegucigalpa

TACA International Airlines, then named Central American Air Transports, was founded in 1931 in Honduras by New Zealander Royal Flying Corps veteran Lowell Yerex. Initially, the airline only transported cargo, but beginning in 1940 the airline began passenger services. TACA began operations with a single-engine Stinson plane. Since its beginnings, routes covered all the national territory and its aircraft sported the XH Mexican registration (which was changed later by HR). Yerex planned to establish one airline in each Latin-American country, such as Aerovias Brasil in Brazil and other TACAs in Mexico, Venezuela, and Colombia. Of all the TACA franchise airlines created, only TACA International of El Salvador survived.

In 1945, Yerex left the company and TACA moved its headquarters to the Republic of El Salvador where it was modernized and expanded. The company then established investment groups in other Latin American countries to be sold to domestic airlines, which in the case of TACA Honduras was sold to SAHSA. Later, TACA was organized as an international company having its headquarters in San Salvador operating under the name of TACA International.

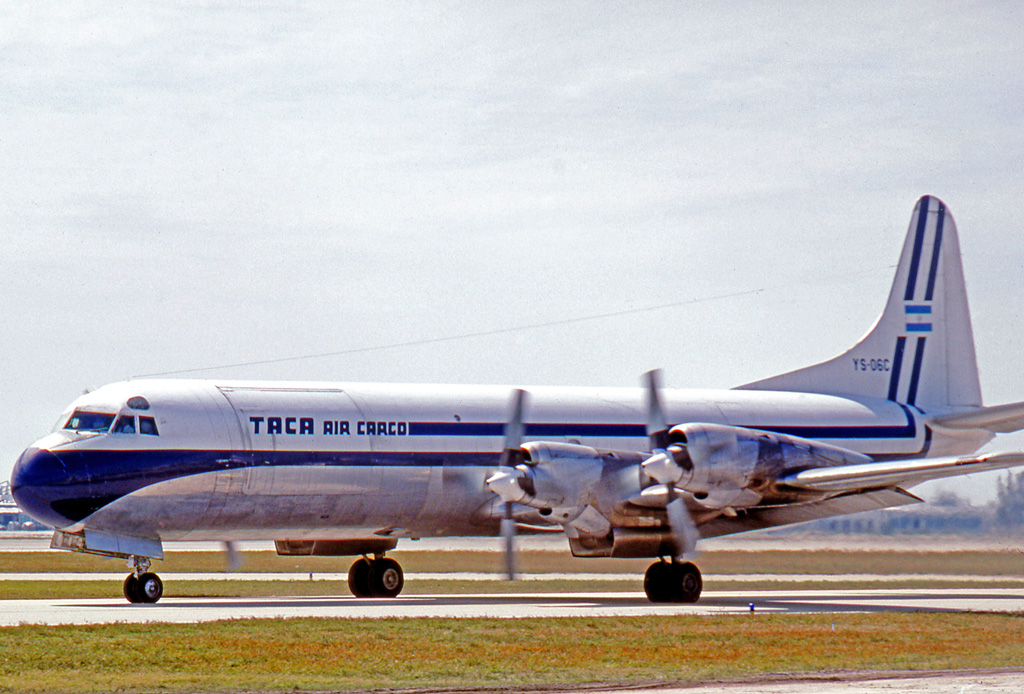
A TACA Air Cargo Lockheed L-188A Electra at Miami International Airport in 1978

During the 1940s and 1950s, the airline began to acquire larger piston-engine airliners including the Douglas DC-3 and the Douglas DC-4. The Vickers Viscount turboprop passenger airliner followed in order to expand its route network around the Americas.

On 28 December 1966, TACA International entered the jet age when it inaugurated its first jet, a BAC One Eleven. This aircraft model was used until 1 June 1988, when it was phased out in favor of the Boeing 737-200. The Lockheed L-188 Electra four-engine turboprop airliner was operated from 1976 by TACA Air Cargo including freight flights to Miami, Florida.

=== Expansion years (1980–2009) ===
Former logo of TACA Airlines from 1999 to 2008

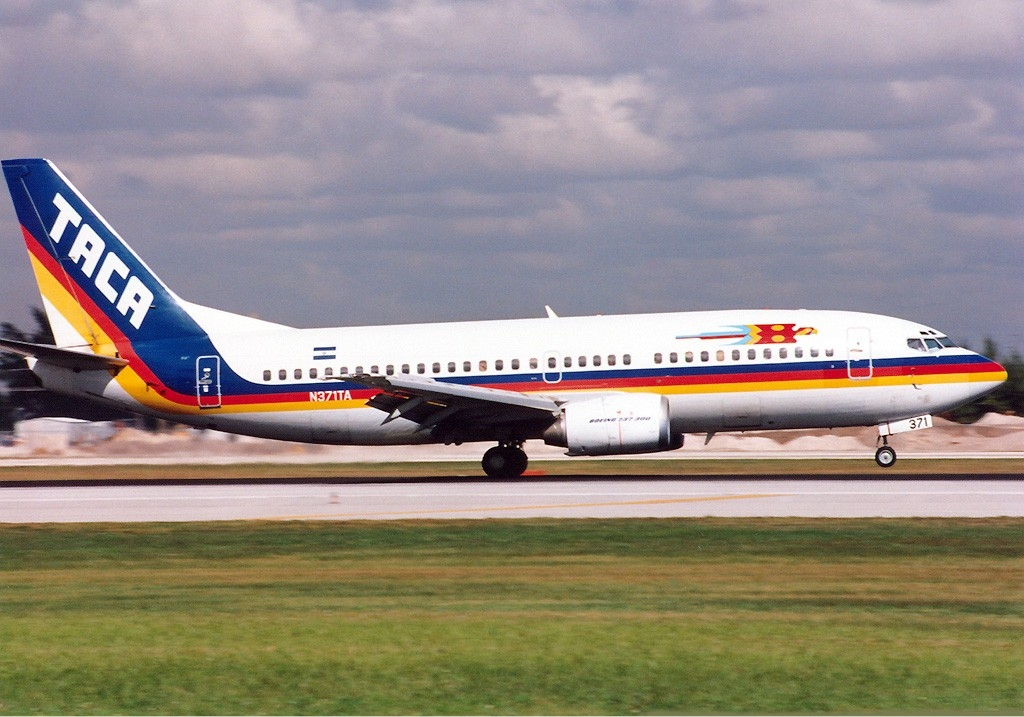
A TACA Boeing 737-300 in 1994

Until 1980, TACA was owned by a United States company and had its corporate headquarters in New Orleans (due to the civil war raging in El Salvador) under the administration of the Kriete Family of El Salvador, who owned a minority stock and ended up buying all the shares.

According to the July 1983 TACA route map, the air carrier was operating jet service to four destinations in the U.S. from Central America (including Houston, Los Angeles, Miami and New Orleans). The airline also made several upgrades to its fleet during the 1980s by replacing the older turboprops as well as BAC One Eleven jetliners with more efficient aircraft, such as the Boeing 737-200 Advanced and 737-300 with the latter type being a member of the Boeing 737 Classic series. TACA later operated wide body Boeing 767s on its scheduled passenger services including international flights to Los Angeles and Miami.

Between 1990 and 1995, TACA bought the majority shares of the flag carrier airlines; Aviateca, LACSA, and Nicaragüense de Aviación, consolidating operations under a new brand group name, Grupo TACA.

In the 1990s, TACA International became the launch customer and principal user of Latin America's Airbus A320. These aircraft were substituting for the aging Boeing 737-200 and the 737-300/-400 series aircraft that were in the fleet, which were gradually retired until 1999.

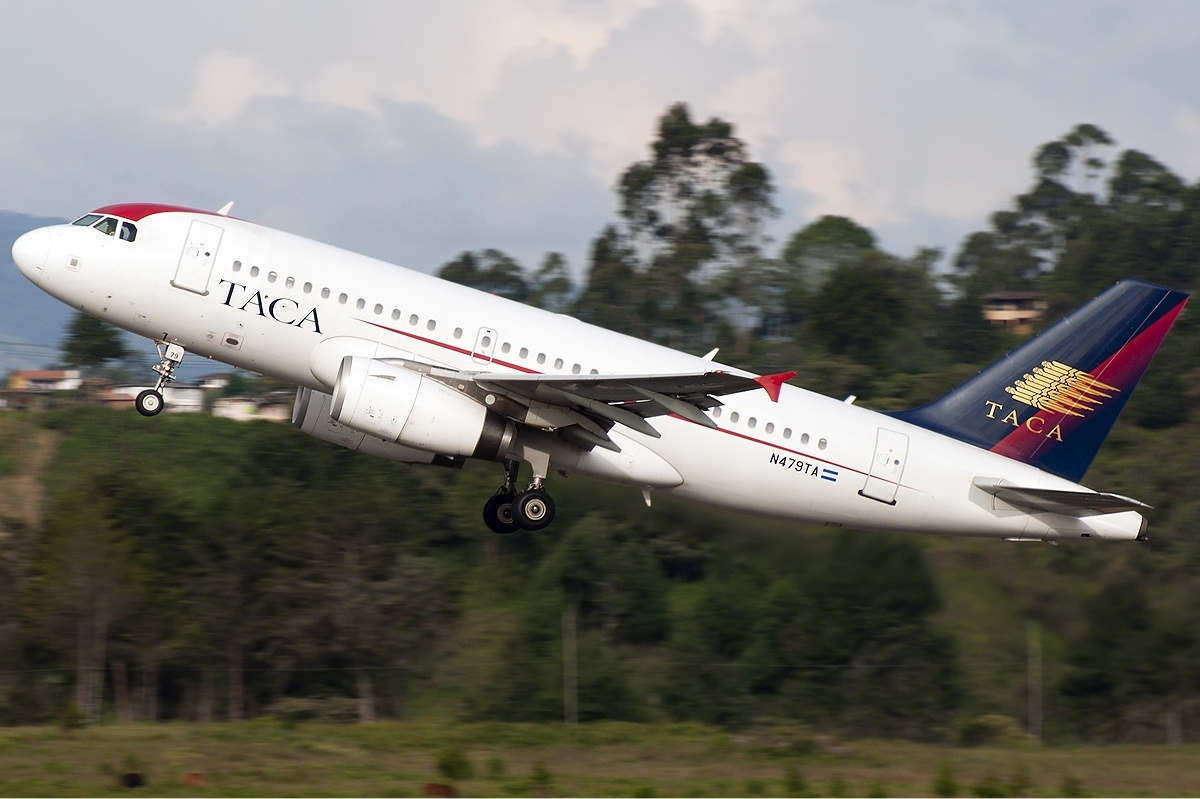
A TACA International Airbus A319-100 taking off from Medellín, Colombia

In 1992, TACA signed a strategic alliance with Panama-based Copa Airlines, and the airline began flying to Tocumen International Airport, making it the first flight connection center in Latin America. As a consequence, Tocumen airport became the "Hub of the Americas" and the integration of several Latin American airlines into the alliance took place. The alliance ended in 1998 after the six-year period established in the agreement expired.

On 9 August 1995, Aviateca Flight 901 crashed into the San Vicente volcano while on approach to Comalapa International Airport killing all 65 people on board the aircraft. The Salvadoran Civil Aviation Authority determined that the accident's probable cause was the flight crew's "lack of situational awareness in relation to the 7,159 foot obstruction [the San Vicente volcano]" and that the airline's crew resource management program was ineffective. As TACA International Airlines was Aviateca's parent company, both airlines faced lawsuits from 21 families of crash victims, however, all the lawsuits were settled out of court.

Then in 2001, having its main hubs in San Salvador and San Jose, the airline set an operations base in Lima, Peru, its first base in South America, causing as a consequence the founding of TACA Perú, of which TACA had 49% shares at. With this new addition, Grupo TACA began to offer a comprehensive network of routes throughout the Americas.

In 2005, TACA was one of the founding members of the Mexican airline Volaris. In the same year, TACA became the first airline in Latin America to operate the Airbus A321.

In 2008, the board of directors decided to revert to the original name, TACA International (since the consolidation of the acquired airlines was completed), and the airline's headquarters returned to San Salvador, El Salvador to a new building which was inaugurated shortly afterward. Also, it revealed a renovation in its corporate image. That same year, TACA became the second user of the Brazilian Embraer 190 in Latin America.

=== AviancaTACA and modernization (2009–12) ===
TACA’s last logo, before its merger with Avianca in 2013

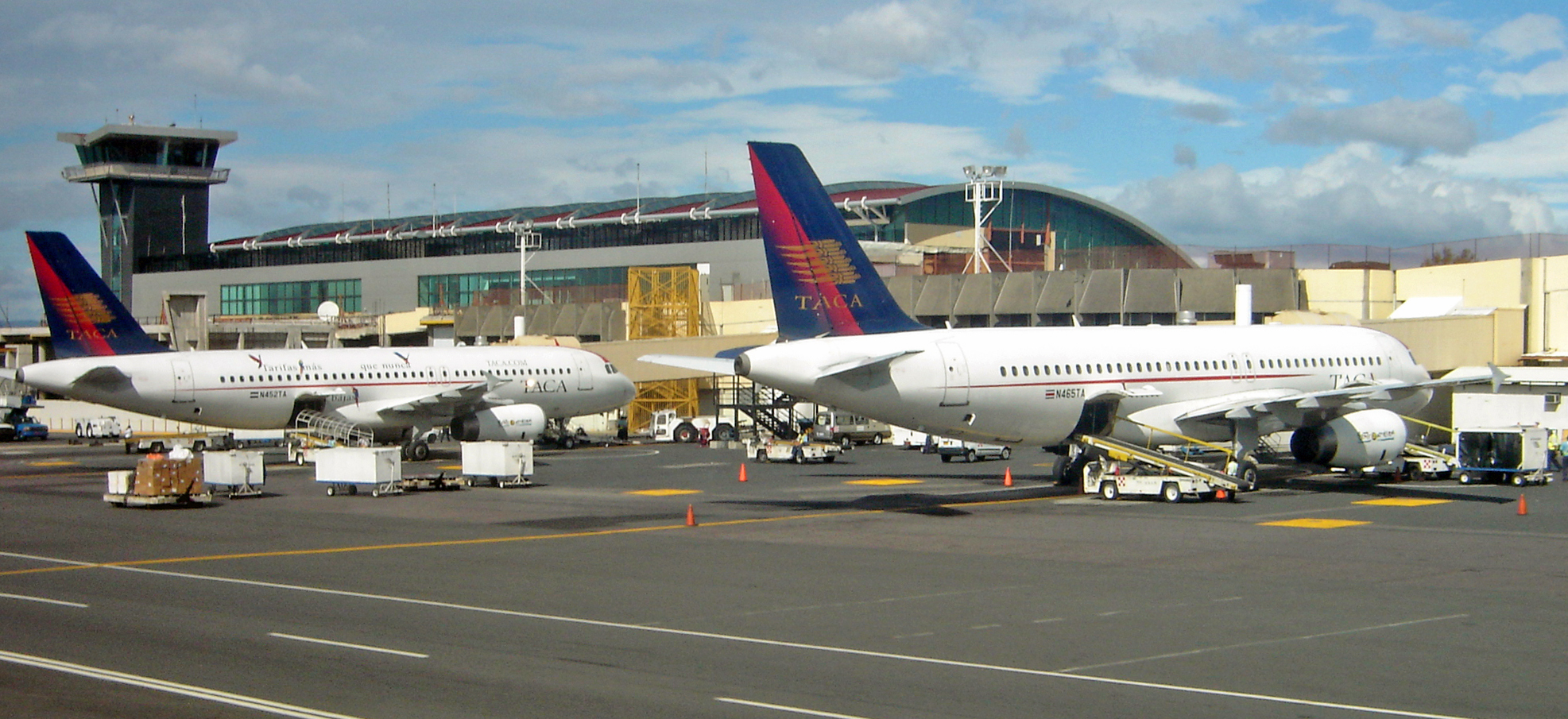
Two Airbus A320-200s from TACA International at Juan Santamaría International Airport

On 7 October 2009, it was announced that TACA International would merge its assets in a strategic alliance with Colombian flag carrier Avianca, in which case each will maintain its trademark and operations. Avianca and TACA International operated a combined fleet of 129 aircraft, serving over 100 destinations in several countries in America and Europe. In December 2009 approval for the merger was given by the Colombian Civil Aeronautical Agency. The merger of Colombia's Avianca and El Salvador-based TACA is the latest sign that consolidation in the Latin American airline sector is picking up.

In June 2011, AviancaTaca signed a Memorandum of Understanding (MoU) for 51 A320 family aircraft, including 33 eco-efficient Airbus A320neos. This made it the largest order for the A320neo in Latin America.

==== Star Alliance (2010–12) ====
On 10 November 2010, Star Alliance announced that Avianca and TACA International were to become full members in mid-2012.

=== Completion of merger and final flight ===
Avianca and TACA completed their merger on 21 May 2013. The day prior, just before midnight, TACA International began to remove all its signs bearing the TACA logo from airports across the US, Canada, Mexico, Central America, South America, and the Caribbean. The last flight with the TACA callsign took place on 20 May 2013. The flight was TACA Flight 566 from El Salvador International Airport to John F. Kennedy International Airport in New York City. It departed San Salvador at 7:50 pm MST and landed in New York at 2:35 am EST. The flight landed two hours and thirty-five minutes after the official re-branding of the airlines; thus, the flight departed with the TACA callsign and landed with the Avianca callsign. The final official TACA flight to have the TACA callsign was TACA Flight 520 from San Salvador to Los Angeles. This flight departed at 7:20 p.m. MST and landed at 11:50 pm PDT. The first flight departing operated by Avianca El Salvador took place on 21 May 2013. The flight was then Avianca El Salvador Flight 561 from San Francisco to San Salvador. The flight departed at 1:25 a.m. PDT and landed at 7:55 a.m. MST. This was followed by Avianca El Salvador Flight 521 from Los Angeles to San Salvador. This flight departed at 1:30 a.m. PDT and landed at 7:30 a.m. MST.

=== Merger and controversy in Costa Rica (2012–13) ===
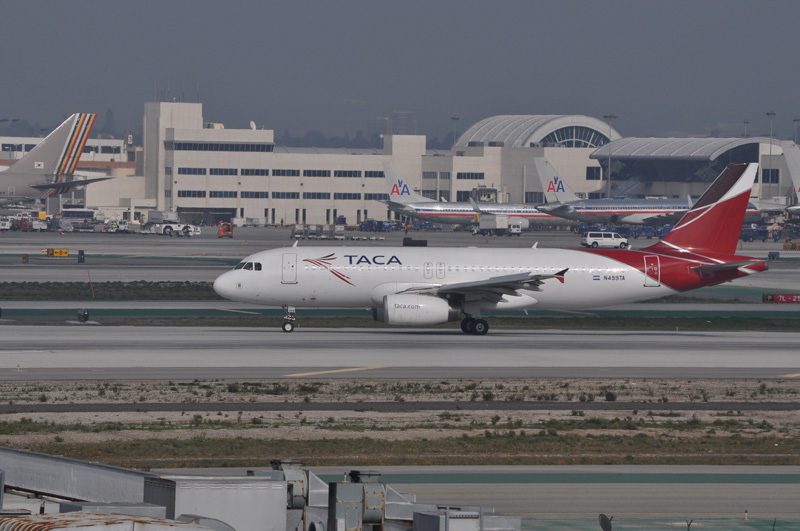
A TACA International Airbus A320-200 in the airline's final livery at Los Angeles

On 10 October 2012, it was reported in a press conference that the trade name TACA International would disappear from the public eye and the promotion and marketing strategies would be owned by Avianca, according to representatives of the group that controls the brand. AviancaTaca's CEO, Fabio Villegas, explained that the use of the single brand for the group would occur in the first half of 2013. Although the TACA trade name would disappear from the public eye, TACA will continue to operate but it will operate under the Avianca El Salvador brand and it will remain a full member of Star Alliance. Despite the TACA name being permanently retired, Avianca El Salvador continues to use the IATA and IACO identifiers "TA" and "TAI", along with the call sign "TACA" for flights.

On 18 May 2013, AviancaTaca Holding downgraded the Juan Santamaría International Airport hub in San José, Costa Rica to a base of operations as part of the post-merger restructuring. This included the discontinuation of more than five non-stop flights made by the airline to and from San Jose, including flights to all cities in the United States. As a consequence, more than 200 employees lost their jobs (equivalent to 20% of the workforce of the airline). This was controversial in Costa Rica and led to an extensive investigation by the civil aviation authorities of that country against the holding company.

On 10 May 2020, Avianca filed for Chapter 11 bankruptcy in the United States after failing to pay bondholders, becoming one of the major airlines to file for bankruptcy due to the COVID-19 pandemic crisis.

In November 2022, Avianca painted one of its Airbus A320s (registration: N567AV) in TACA Airlines' 1990s livery.

== Operations ==
Avianca El Salvador is headquartered at Avenida El Espino in Antiguo Cuscatlán, El Salvador. The airline's air operator's certificate is COA-002-TA. Avianca El Salvador uses the ICAO airline designator "TAI"; it used the IATA airline designator "TA" until 1 January 2024 which it transitioned to the Avianca code "AV".

== Services ==
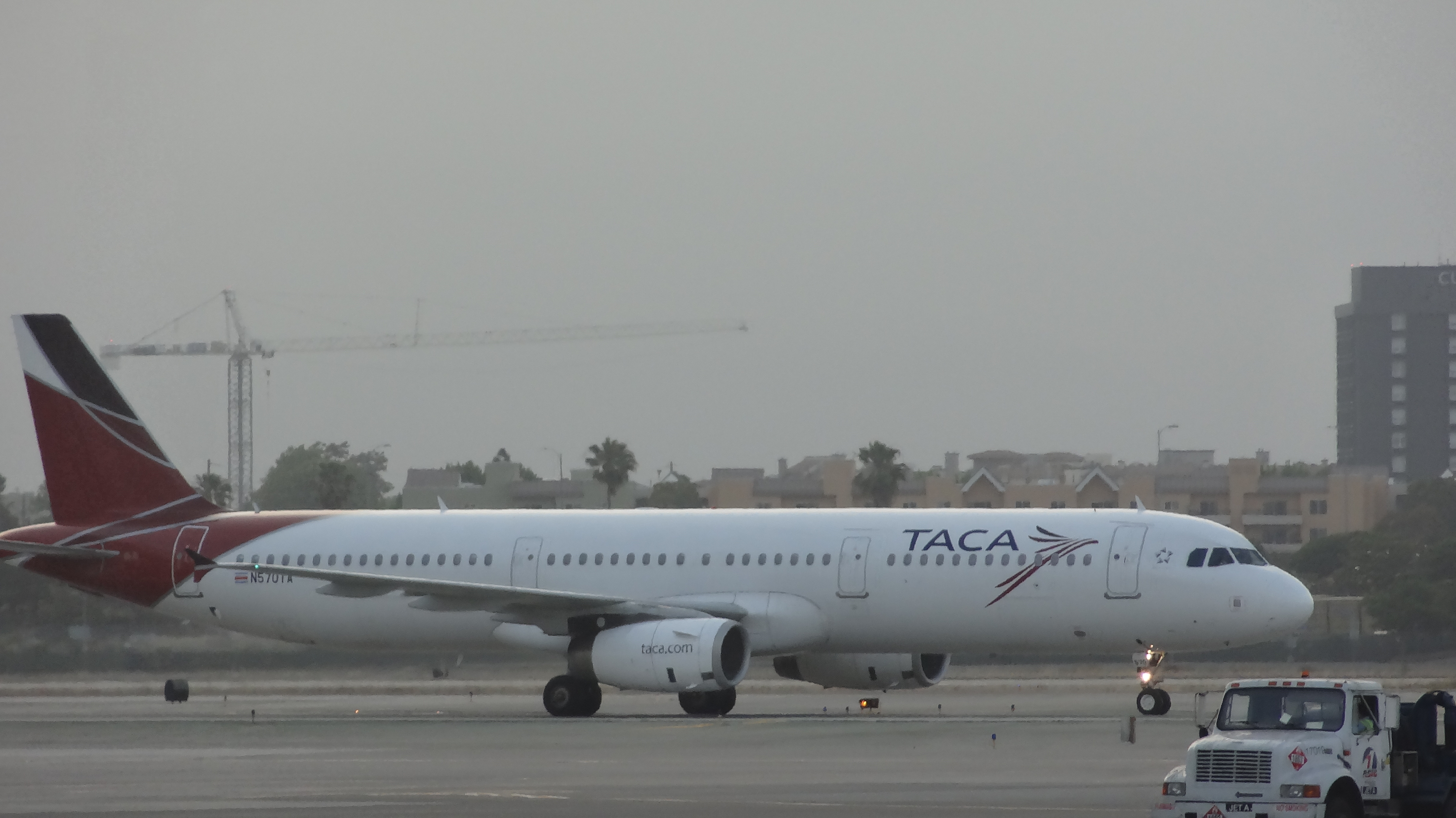
A TACA International Airbus A321-200 landing at Los Angeles International Airport

The former airlines that made up Grupo TACA were:

- TACA International
  - TACA Regional
- Aviateca
  - Inter Regional - operated under Aviateca's code.
- Isleña Airlines
- LACSA
- Nicaragüense de Aviación
- TACA Perú

The airline's hubs before the Avianca merger were:

- Monseñor Óscar Arnulfo Romero International Airport in San Salvador, El Salvador
- Jorge Chávez International Airport in Lima, Peru
- Juan Santamaría International Airport in San José, Costa Rica ended in May 2013

== Destinations ==
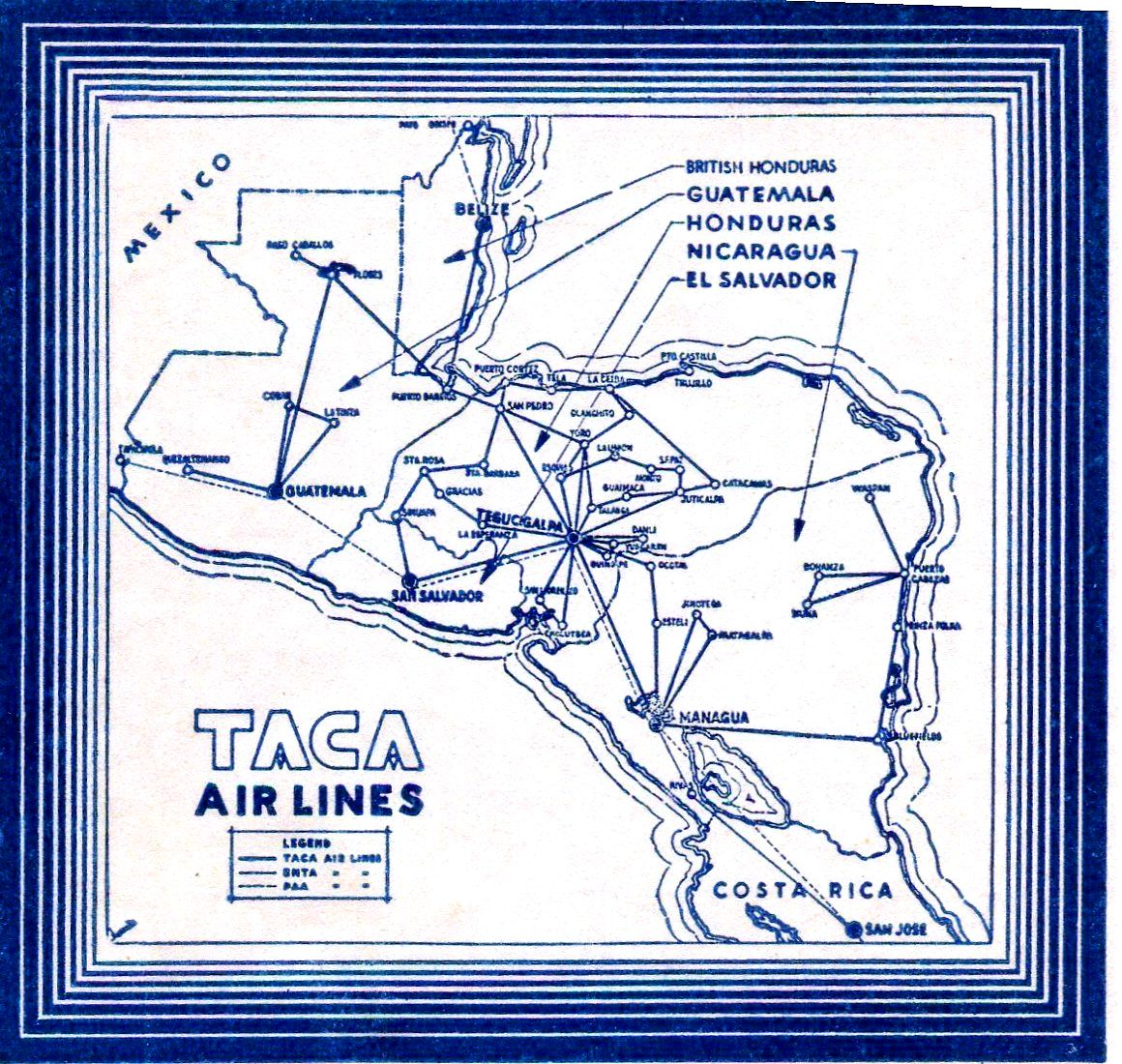
A map of routes operated by TACA Airlines in 1940

Avianca El Salvador serves destinations throughout North and South America.

Country	City	Airport	Notes	Refs
Belize	Belize City	Philip S. W. Goldson International Airport	Terminated	
Canada	Montreal	Montréal–Trudeau International Airport	Seasonal	
Canada	Toronto	Toronto Pearson International Airport		
Colombia	Bogotá	El Dorado International Airport		
Colombia	Cali	Alfonso Bonilla Aragón International Airport	Terminated	
Colombia	Cartagena	Rafael Núñez International Airport	Terminated	
Colombia	Medellín	José María Córdova International Airport		
Costa Rica	Liberia	Daniel Oduber Quirós International Airport	Terminated	
Costa Rica	San José	Juan Santamaría International Airport	Focus city	
Cuba	Havana	José Martí International Airport	Terminated	
Ecuador	Guayaquil	José Joaquín de Olmedo International Airport		
Ecuador	Quito	Mariscal Sucre International Airport		
El Salvador	San Salvador	El Salvador International Airport	Hub	
Guatemala	Guatemala City	La Aurora International Airport		
Honduras	Comayagua	Palmerola International Airport		
Honduras	Roatán	Juan Manuel Gálvez International Airport	Terminated	
Honduras	San Pedro Sula	Ramón Villeda Morales International Airport		
Honduras	Tegucigalpa	Toncontín International Airport	Terminated	
Mexico	Cancún	Cancún International Airport		
Mexico	Mexico City	Mexico City International Airport		
Nicaragua	Managua	Augusto C. Sandino International Airport		
Panama	Panama City	Tocumen International Airport		
Peru	Lima	Jorge Chávez International Airport		
Spain	Madrid	Madrid–Barajas Airport	Seasonal	
United States	Boston	Logan International Airport		
United States	Chicago	O'Hare International Airport	Seasonal	
United States	Dallas	Dallas/Fort Worth International Airport		
United States	Houston	George Bush Intercontinental Airport		
United States	Las Vegas	Harry Reid International Airport	Seasonal	
United States	Los Angeles	Los Angeles International Airport		
United States	Miami	Miami International Airport		
United States	Newark	Newark Liberty International Airport	Terminated	
United States	New Orleans	New Orleans International Airport	Terminated	
United States	New York City	John F. Kennedy International Airport		
United States	Oakland	Oakland International Airport	Terminated	
United States	Ontario	Ontario International Airport		
United States	Orlando	Orlando International Airport	Seasonal	
United States	San Francisco	San Francisco International Airport		
United States	Washington, D.C.	Dulles International Airport		

=== Codeshare agreements ===
The airline has codeshare agreements with the following airlines:

- Avianca
- Iberia
- United Airlines

== Fleet ==
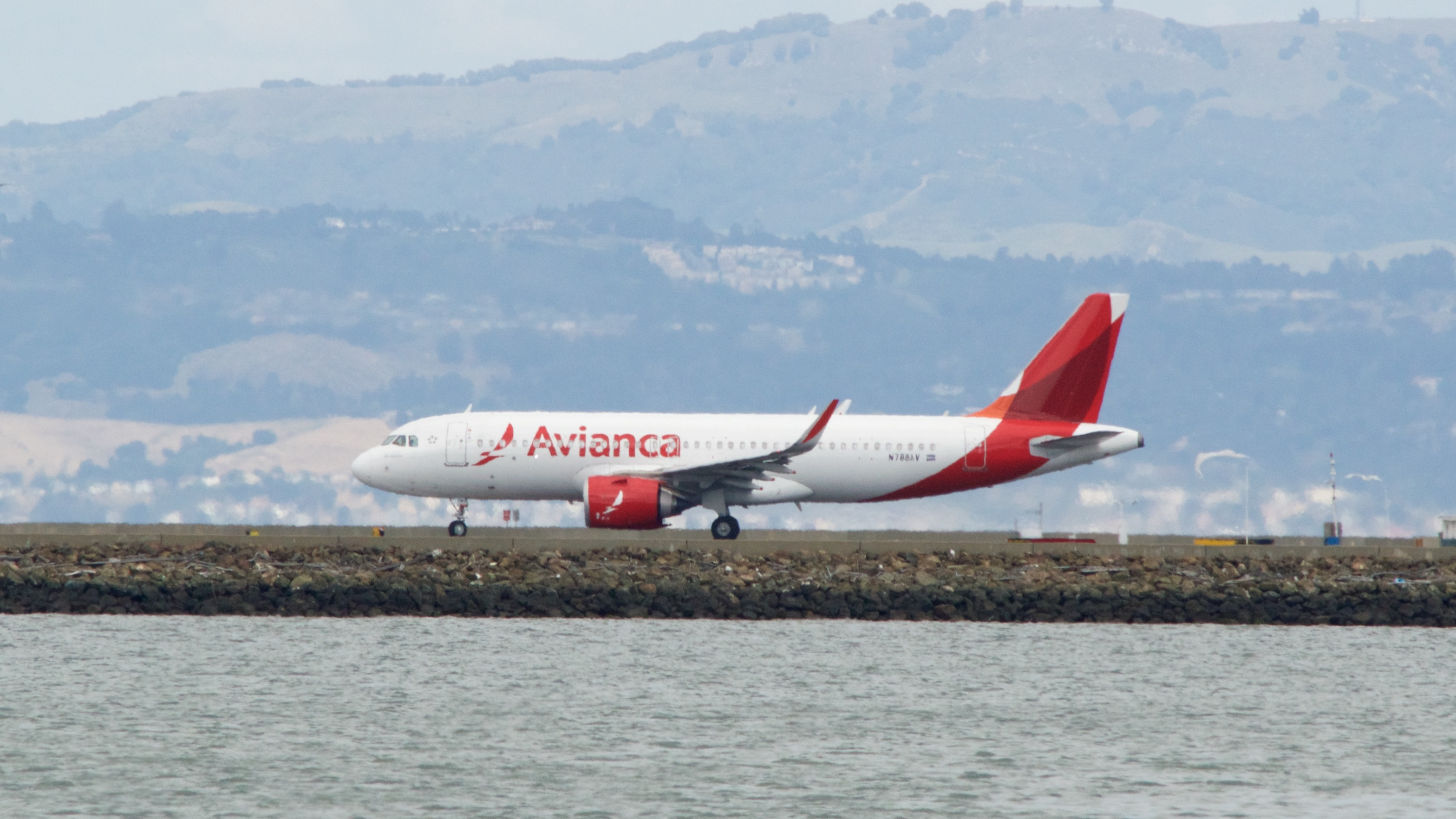
Avianca El Salvador Airbus A320neo at San Francisco International Airport in 2022.

=== Current fleet ===
As of July 2026, Avianca El Salvador operates the following aircraft:

Avianca El Salvador fleet
Aircraft	In service	Orders	Passengers				Notes
Aircraft	In service	Orders	W	Y+	Y	Total	Notes
Airbus A320-200	11	—	12	60	108	180	
Airbus A320neo	8	—	12	60	108	180	
Total	19	—					

=== Former fleet ===
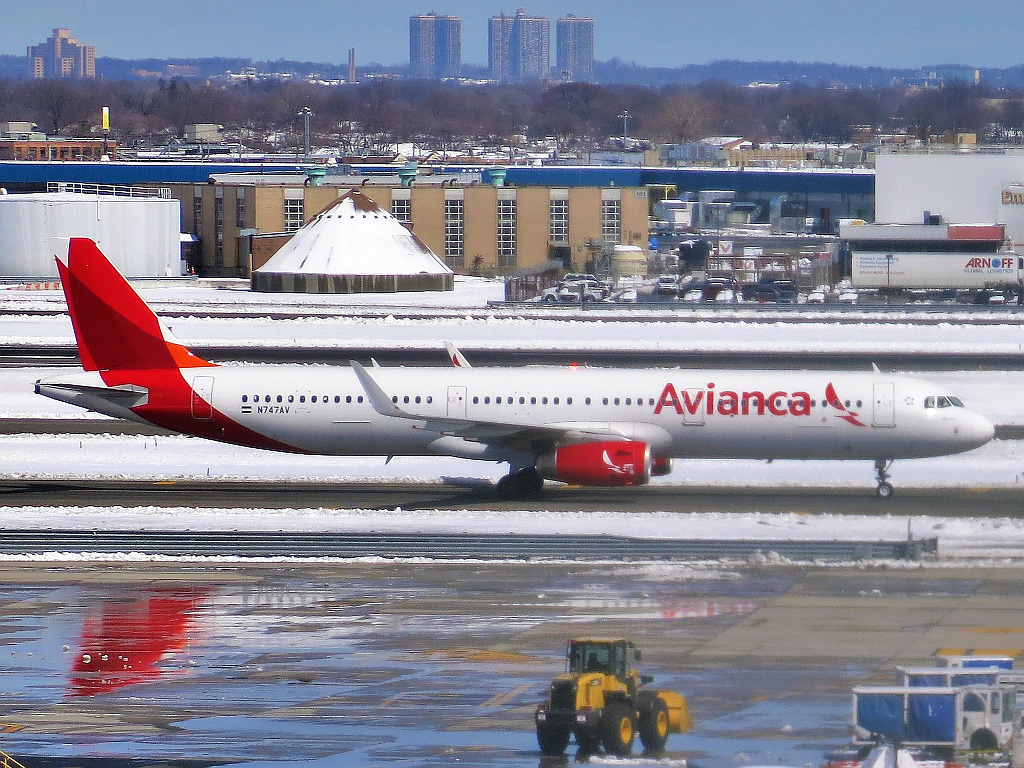
A former Avianca El Salvador Airbus A321-200 at John F. Kennedy International Airport in 2018

As of September 2025, Avianca El Salvador operated 8 Airbus A320 and 12 Airbus A320neo.

TACA International operated the following aircraft:

Avianca El Salvador former fleet
Aircraft	Total	Introduced	Retired	Notes
Airbus A300B4-200F	5	1998	2001	Operated by JHM Airlines Cargo
Airbus A319-100	14	1999	2023	
Airbus A321-200	6	2005	2022	
BAC One-Eleven Series 400	3	1966	1988	
BAC One-Eleven Series 500	1	1981	1982	
Beechcraft 17	1	1950	1953	
Bellanca CH-300 Pacemaker	1	1935	1944	
Bellanca CH-400 Skyrocket	3	1934	Unknown	
Boeing 737-200	16	1982	2005	
Boeing 737-300	9	1988	1999	
Boeing 737-400	1	1992	1993	Transferred to Carnival Air Lines
Boeing 767-200	2	1985	1995	
Boeing 767-200ER	3	1992	1997	
Boeing 767-300ER	3	1993	2000	
Canadair CL-44	1	1974	1974	
Cessna Citation I	1	1994	1995	
Curtiss C-46 Commando	2	1945	1970	
Douglas C-47 Skytrain	15	1945	1948	
Douglas C-54 Skymaster	3	1949	1975	
Douglas DC-4	2	1947	1973	
Douglas DC-6	5	1970	1978	
Embraer 190AR	12	2008	2019	
Ford 5-AT Tri-Motor	18	1934	1944	
Grumman G-21 Goose	1	1947	Unknown	
Kreutzer K-5 Air Coach	2	Unknown	1937	
Lockheed Model 18 Lodestar	1	Unknown	1947	
Lockheed L-188A Electra	2	1975	1985	
Metal Aircraft Flamingo	2	Unknown	Unknown	
Stinson Model O	3	Unknown	Unknown	
Stinson Model U	1	Unknown	Unknown	
Vickers Viscount	7	1954	1975	

== Reciprocal frequent-flyer agreements ==
LifeMiles is the frequent-flyer program of Avianca and TACA International as of 2009, because of the merger with Avianca. It replaced the old "Distancia" program.

== Accidents and incidents ==
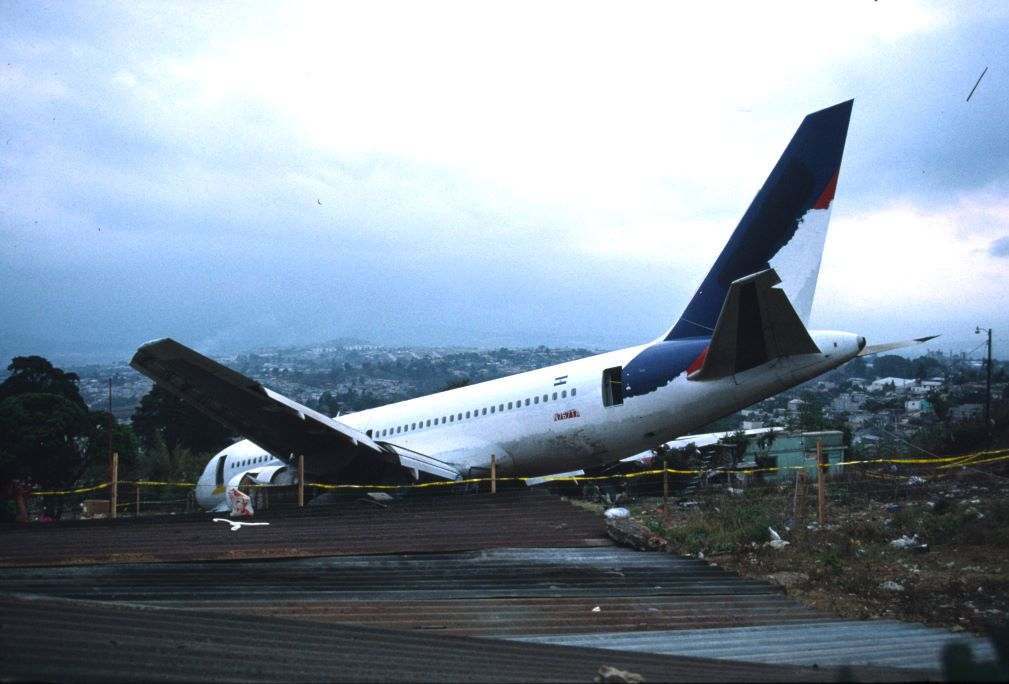
TACA Flight 510 crash in Guatemala City, April 6, 1993

- On 3 June 1945, a Douglas DC-3 (registered YS-22) owned by TACA and operated by Aerovias Brasil made an emergency landing on the Rede Mineira de Viação and caught fire. All 4 crew members survived.
- On 17 March 1947, a Lockheed C-60 Lodestar (registered YS-28) crashed into the Cerro del Padre Amaya mountain range in Colombia, killing all 8 occupants.
- On 5 March 1959, a Vickers Viscount (registered YS-09C) crashed shortly after take-off from Managua International Airport at Managua, Nicaragua when both port engines failed. 15 of the 19 people on board were killed.
- On 2 May 1976, a Douglas DC-6 (registered YS-35C) undershot the runway on approach to the Rubelsanto Airport in Guatemala. No crew members were killed.
- On 2 February 1980, a Lockheed L-188 Electra (registered YS-07C) caught fire while on the ground in San Salvador, damaging the aircraft beyond repair.
- On 24 May 1988, TACA Flight 110, a Boeing 737-300 (registered N75356) operating to New Orleans, suffered a double engine flame-out due to water ingestion, a result of an in-flight encounter with an area of hefty rain and hail. The design of the engines and FAA water ingestion certification standards did not take into account the higher water volume of strong or severe thunderstorms while operating at lower power. The plane landed without further damage on a grass levee at the NASA Michoud Assembly Facility. All 45 passengers were uninjured.
- On 20 July 1988, a Douglas DC-6 (registered N33VX) lost power on three of its four engines due to fuel starvation. The aircraft attempted an emergency landing, but the wing hit the ground upon landing at Golden Meadow, Louisiana, destroying the aircraft. All 3 crew members were killed.
- On 5 April 1993, TACA Flight 510, a Boeing 767-200 (registered N767TA), overran the runway at Guatemala City's La Aurora International Airport due to an inability to brake on the flooded runway.
- On 24 April 1995, a Cessna Citation I (registered N120ES) undershot the runway on approach to the Comalapa International Airport in San Salvador, colliding with trees 2,500 feet short of the runway. Both crew members survived.
- On 30 May 2008, TACA Flight 390, an Airbus A320-200 (registered EI-TAF), overran a rain-soaked runway on landing at Toncontín International Airport in Tegucigalpa, Honduras. There were 5 fatalities, 2 of which were on the ground.

== See also ==
- List of airlines of El Salvador

== Bibliography ==
- Yerex, D. (1985). Yerex of TACA. Carterton (N.Z.): Ampersand Publ. Ass. Ltd.
- Davies, R.E.G. (1987). Rebels and reformers of the airways. Airlife Publishing Ltd. & Smithsonian Institution Press.
