= Luis Procuna =

Mexican bullfighter (1923–1995)

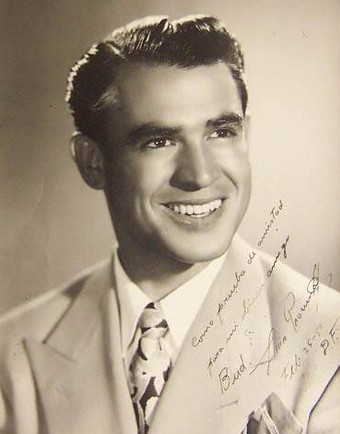

Personal information
- Full name: Luis Procuna Montes
- Born: July 23, 1923 Mexico City, Mexico
- Died: August 9, 1995 (aged 72) San Vicente volcano, El Salvador
- Children: Flor Procuna

Sport
- Sport: Bullfighting
- Rank: Matador

Luis Procuna Montes (July 23, 1923 - August 9, 1995) known as The St. John's antler, was a Mexican bullfighter.

== Biography ==
He made his debut on August 14, 1941, taking the alternativa in Ciudad Juárez in 1942 sponsored by Luis Castro "El Soldado". His presentation in Spain was in La Monumental on May 6, 1951, and in Las Ventas of Madrid on 14 June of the same year. By 1945 he was touring several South American countries such as Colombia, Peru and Venezuela. Procuna played himself in the documentary film Torero!, released in 1956. On March 10, 1974, he cut his ponytail at the Plaza de Toros México, which he inaugurated in 1946, with Manolete and Luis Castro (The Soldier).

== Death ==
Procuna was among 65 people who died on 9 August 1995 aboard Aviateca Flight 901, which crashed into the San Vicente Volcano, located in El Salvador.
