= Stinson Model O =

Model O
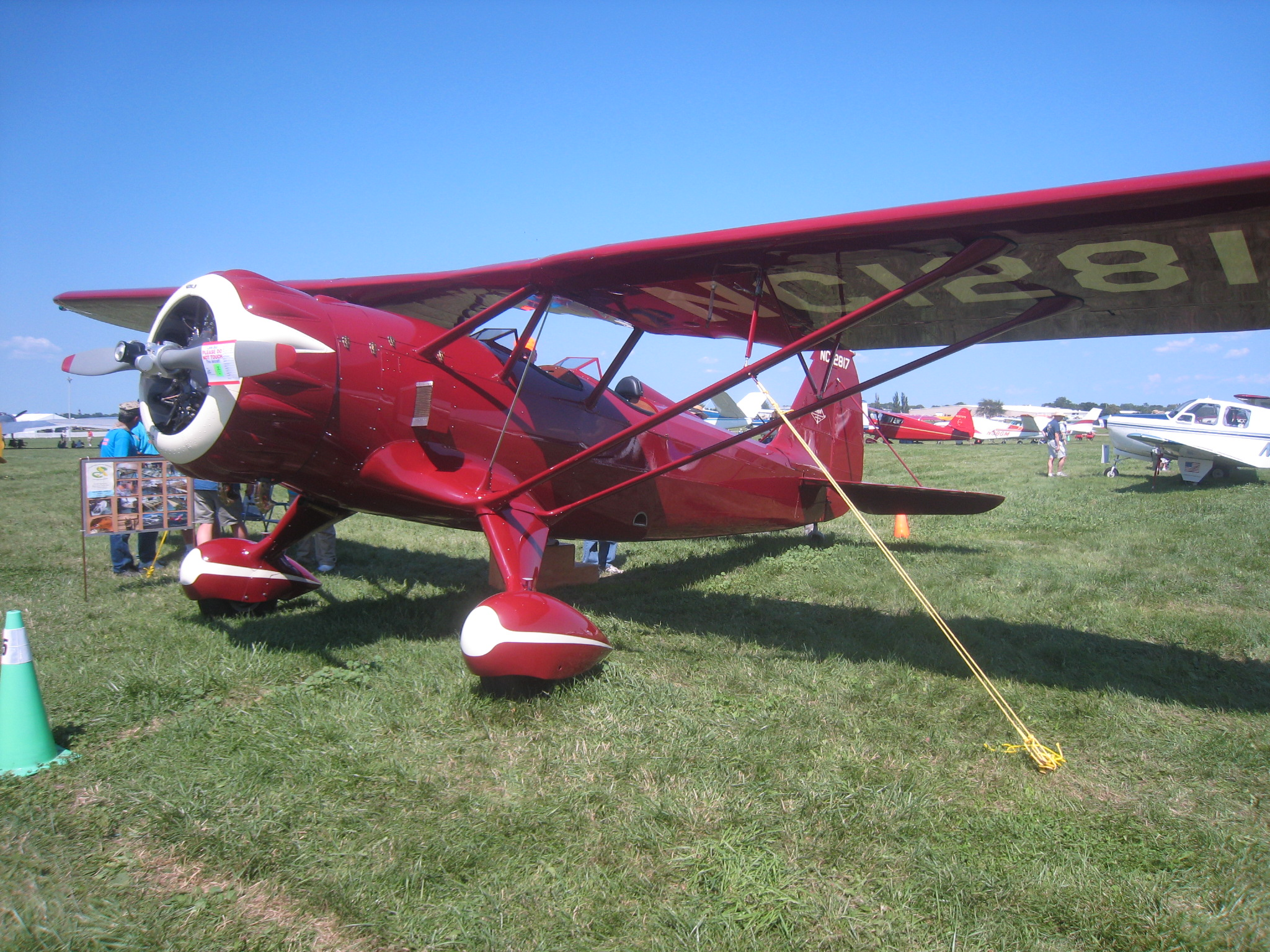

General information
- Type: Trainer
- National origin: United States of America
- Manufacturer: Stinson Aircraft Company
- Designer: Robert L. Hall
- Primary user: Honduran Air Force
- Number built: 9

History
- First flight: May 1933
- Developed from: Stinson Reliant

The Stinson Model O was an American single-engined military trainer aircraft of the 1930s designed built by the Stinson Aircraft Company. Based on the Stinson SR, the Model O was designed to meet a requirement of the Honduran Air Force, forming the initial equipment of that air arm.

== Design and development ==
In 1933, New Zealander Lowell Yerex, who had flown reconnaissance flights in his Stinson Detroiter for forces loyal to Honduran President-elect Tiburcio Carías Andino in a civil war in December 1931, and subsequently founded the South American airline consortium TACA, was tasked with buying trainers and counter-insurgency aircraft for the Escuela Nacional de Aviación or National Aviation School, which was later to form the core of the Honduran Air Force. Following discussions between Yerex and the Stinson Aircraft Company, Robert Hall, designer of the Gee Bee Model Z racing aircraft, designed an aircraft to meet the Honduran requirement.

Hall's design, the Model O, was a parasol wing monoplane which used the wings and tail surfaces of the Stinson SR Reliant four-seat private aircraft, combining them with a new fuselage seating the crew of two in tandem in open cockpits (the Model O was the first and only Stinson aircraft to have open cockpits). The aircraft was powered by a Lycoming R-680 radial engine, rated at 220 hp (160 kW) and capable of running on low-octane rating fuel. The aircraft could be armed with two fixed forward-firing machine guns, with a further machine gun flexibly mounted in the observer's cockpit, while a bomb rack could be mounted beneath the fuselage. Design and construction proceeded quickly, with the prototype first flying in May 1933.

== Operational history ==
Honduras purchased three Model Os, taking delivery in December 1933, when they formed the initial equipment of the Escuela Nacional de Aviación, with Honduran serial numbers 1–3. Following the Japanese attack on Pearl Harbor in December 1941, Honduras's Model Os were used to carry out patrols along the coast of the still-neutral country. One of the Model Os went missing during such a patrol, but the other two were still in use at the end of the Second World War in 1945.

A total of nine Model Os were built, with three being sold to China, one to Argentina and one to Brazil. With the Spanish Civil War raging, an attempt was made in 1938 by Republican Spain to purchase 100 Model Os, with President Franklin D. Roosevelt's brother-in-law Hall Roosevelt acting as negotiator for the Spanish, but the American arms embargo stopped the deal. The prototype remained in the United States as a civil aircraft, and was still in use in 1946.

A replica Model O was constructed by Evergreen Aviation Services of Portland, Oregon, using the wings and tail of a Stinson SR-5 Reliant and a fuselage and wing center-section reconstructed from photographs. It first flew on March 24, 2010.

== Operators ==
China

- Kwangsi Air Force purchased three Model Os in 1934.

Honduras

- Honduran Air Force

== Specifications ==
Data from General Dynamics Aircraft and their Predecessors

General characteristics

- Crew: 2
- Length: 27 ft 8 in (8.43 m)
- Wingspan: 39 ft 11 in (12.17 m)
- Height: 8 ft 0 in (2.44 m)
- Wing area: 215 sq ft (20.0 m^{2})
- Airfoil: Clark Y
- Empty weight: 1,907 lb (865 kg)
- Gross weight: 2,617 lb (1,187 kg)
- Fuel capacity: 50 US gal (42 imp gal; 190 L)
- Powerplant: 1 × Lycoming R-680-B6 nine-cylinder radial engine, 225 hp (168 kW)

Performance

- Maximum speed: 136 mph (219 km/h, 118 kn)
- Cruise speed: 122 mph (196 km/h, 106 kn)
- Range: 450 mi (720 km, 390 nmi)
- Service ceiling: 16,000 ft (4,900 m)
- Rate of climb: 1,100 ft/min (5.6 m/s)
