= Flor Procuna =

Mexican actress (1952–2025)

- Born: Flor Procuna Chamorro; 20 May 1952; Mexico City, Mexico
- Died: 1 March 2025 (aged 72); Guadalajara, Jalisco, Mexico
- Occupation: Actress
- Years active: 1968–2007
- Known for: Los ricos también lloran
- Children: 2
- Parents: Luis Procuna (father); Consuelo Chamorro (mother)

Flor Procuna Chamorro (20 May 1952 – 1 March 2025) was a Mexican actress, best known as the villainous Irma Ramos in the telenovela Los ricos también lloran.

Flor Procuna was the daughter of Mexican bullfighter Luis Procuna and Consuelo Chamorro Benard and the aunt of Alejandra Procuna. Her maternal grandmother, Agustina (Tina) Benard de Chamorro, was a well-known personality who acted in several plays in her country, Nicaragua. Procuna died in Guadalajara, Jalisco on 1 March 2025, at the age of 72.

== Selected filmography ==
=== Soap operas ===
- Los inconformes (1968)
- Los caudillos (1968)
- Águeda (1968)
- Extraño en su pueblo (1973)
- Rosario de amor (1978)
- Cartas para una víctima (1978)
- Los ricos también lloran (1979)
- Soledad (TV series) (1980)
- Vanessa (1982)
- Rosa salvaje (1988)
- Velo de novia (2003)
- Duelo de pasiones (2006)
- Tormenta en el paraíso (2007)

=== Film ===
- Un toro me llama (1968)
- ¿Por qué nací mujer?(1970)
- El cínico (1970)
- Tápame contigo (1970)
- Mi mesera (1973)
- Renzo, el gitano (1973)
- Derecho de asilo (1975)
- Albur de amor (1980)
- Mentiras (1986)
