= Procuna =

Procuna is a surname. Notable people with the surname include:

- Alejandra Procuna (born 1969), Mexican actress
- Ciro Procuna, Mexican sports announcer
- Flor Procuna (1952–2025), Mexican actress
