= Carlos Velo =

Spanish film director

- Born: 15 November 1909; Cartelle, Spain
- Died: 10 March 1988 (aged 78); Mexico City, Mexico
- Occupations: Film director Film producer Screenwriter
- Years active: 1934–1983

Carlos Velo Corbelos (Note: In this Spanish name, the first or paternal surname is Velo and the second or maternal family name is Corbelos.) (15 November 1909 – 10 March 1988) was a Spanish film director. He directed 45 films between 1934 and 1983. His 1956 film Torero! was nominated for an Academy Award for Best Documentary Feature.

== Selected filmography ==
- Torero! (1956)
- Sonatas (1959)
- Pedro Páramo (1967)
