= Torero! (film) =

1956 film

¡Torero!
- Film poster
- Directed by: Carlos Velo
- Written by: Hugo Butler; Carlos Velo
- Produced by: Manuel Barbachano Ponce; George P. Werker
- Starring: Luis Procuna
- Cinematography: Ramón Muñoz
- Edited by: Miguel Campos; Luis Sobreyra
- Release date: September 1956
- Running time: 75 minutes
- Country: Mexico
- Language: Spanish

¡Torero! (English: "bullfighter!") is a 1956 Mexican documentary film directed by Carlos Velo about Mexican bullfighter Luis Procuna. It was nominated for an Academy Award for Best Documentary Feature. The film was also selected as the Mexican entry for the Best Foreign Language Film at the 30th Academy Awards, but was not accepted as a nominee.

== Cast ==
- Luis Procuna as himself
- Consuelo Procuna as herself
- Ángel Procuna
- Antonio Sevilia
- José Farjat
- Arturo Fregoso
- Ponciano Díaz
- Paco Malgesto
- Manolete as himself
- Carlos Arruza as himself
- Luis Briones as himself
- Manuel Dos Santos as himself
- Luís Castro as himself (as El Soldado)
- Lorenzo Garza as himself
- José Laurentino López Rodriguez as Novillero Joselillo
- Dolores del Río as Guest
- Miroslava as herself

== See also ==
- List of submissions to the 30th Academy Awards for Best Foreign Language Film
- List of Mexican submissions for the Academy Award for Best Foreign Language Film
