= TACA Flight 510 =

1993 aviation accident in Guatemala

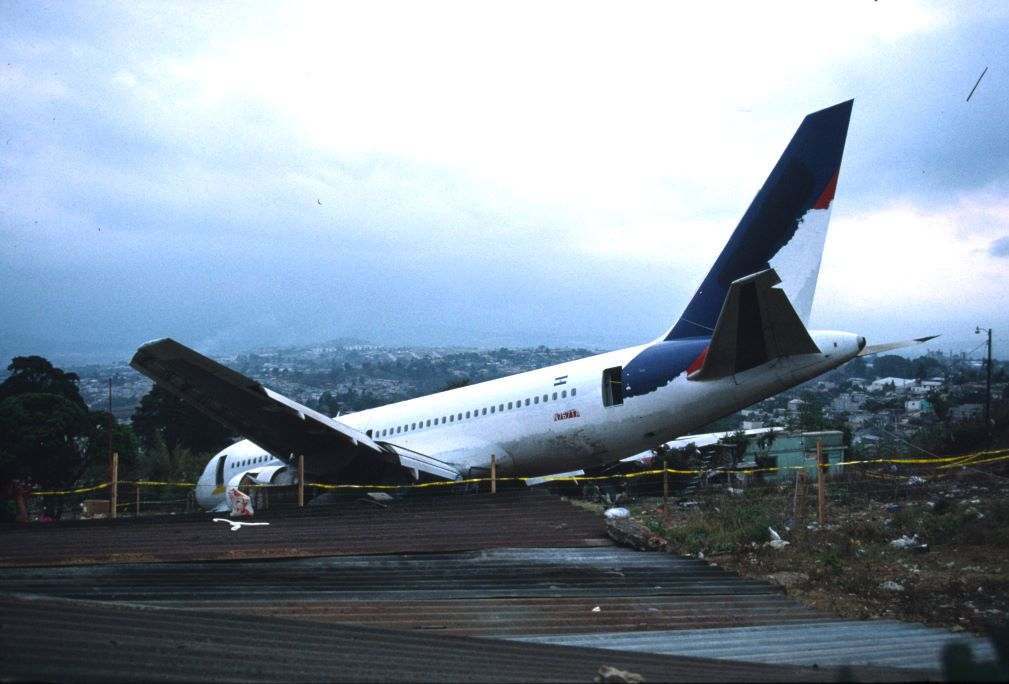
- The aircraft after the incident

Accident
- Date: April 6, 1993
- Summary: Runway overrun due to pilot error
- Site: La Aurora International Airport, Guatemala City, Guatemala
- Total injuries: 8

Aircraft
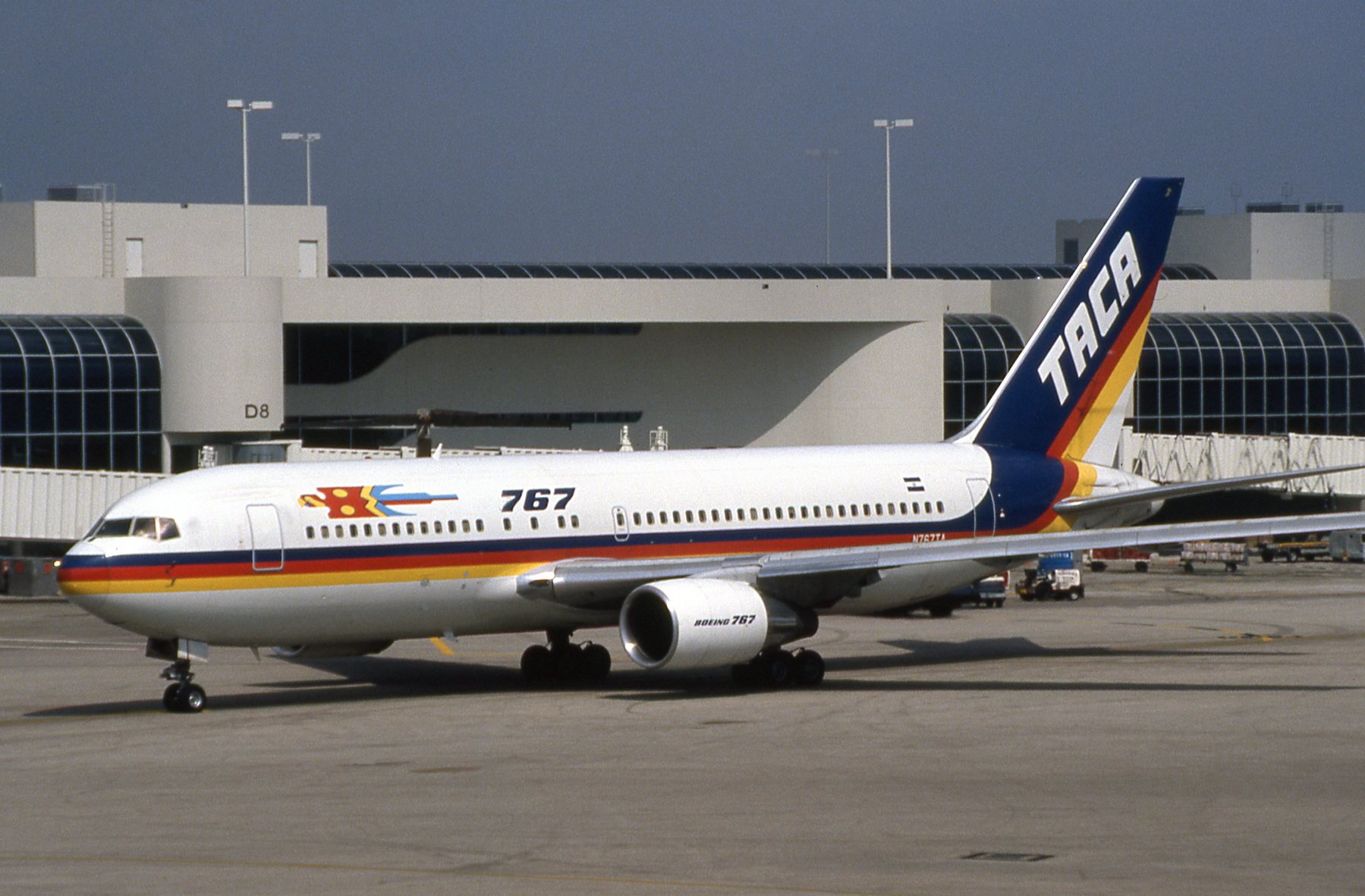
- N767TA, the aircraft involved, pictured in 1989
- Aircraft type: Boeing 767-2S1ER
- Operator: TACA International Airlines
- IATA flight No.: TA510
- ICAO flight No.: TAI510
- Call sign: TACA 510
- Registration: N767TA
- Flight origin: El Salvador International Airport, San Salvador, El Salvador
- Destination: La Aurora International Airport, Guatemala City, Guatemala
- Occupants: 236
- Passengers: 215
- Crew: 11
- Fatalities: 0
- Injuries: 5
- Survivors: 236

Ground casualties
- Ground injuries: 3

TACA Flight 510 was a scheduled passenger flight from San Salvador, El Salvador and Guatemala City, Guatemala. On 6 April 1993, the aircraft operating the flight overran the runway during the landing sequence and crashed into a residential area. All 227 passengers and 9 crew on board survived the accident. Three people on the ground were injured, but there were no fatalities. The investigation found that pilot error was a cause of the runway overrun with the pilots landing at an excessive speed.

== Aircraft and crew ==
The aircraft involved was a Boeing 767-2S1ER registered as N767TA, manufactured in 1986 (serial no. 23494) and had accumulated a total of 27,558 flight hours prior to the accident. It was equipped with two GE CF6-80A2 engines. The captain was Miguel Call.

== Accident ==
The weather conditions at the time were rain showers with visibility under 5 km and a cloud ceiling at a height of about 2000 ft. At 18:27 local time flight 510 touched down on runway 19, 1070 meters from the runway threshold. The crew deployed the thrust reversers. However, the aircraft did not decelerate and overran the runway at a speed of 90 knots. It careened into the Santa Fe and La Libertad neighborhoods at the edge of the airport, smashing through a cinderblock house and coming to rest on top of another house. 4 people on the ground were injured. There were no fatalities onboard the plane, but 5 occupants were injured. 2 homes were completely destroyed and another 2 were partially damaged from the impact. After the accident, the aircraft was written off and scrapped.

== Investigation ==
The investigation into the accident found that several factors played a role. The crew had approached the runway above the glideslope, resulting in an unstabilized approach. As well, the pilots landed at a speed that was much higher than the normal landing speed and touched down at a point very far from the runway threshold. This would have reduced the amount of runway remaining to slow the aircraft, even with functioning thrust reversers. The rainy conditions at the time of the crash, with the runway wet and slippery, further hampered the crew's efforts to slow the plane, reducing braking efficiency. In addition, a tailwind present during the landing may have increased the plane's speed slightly, requiring more runway to slow the plane. Finally, with the conditions the crew faced at the time of landing, a go-around must have been executed and the landing tried again. The crew's failure to execute a go-around and proceed with the challenging landing contributed to the accident/outcome.

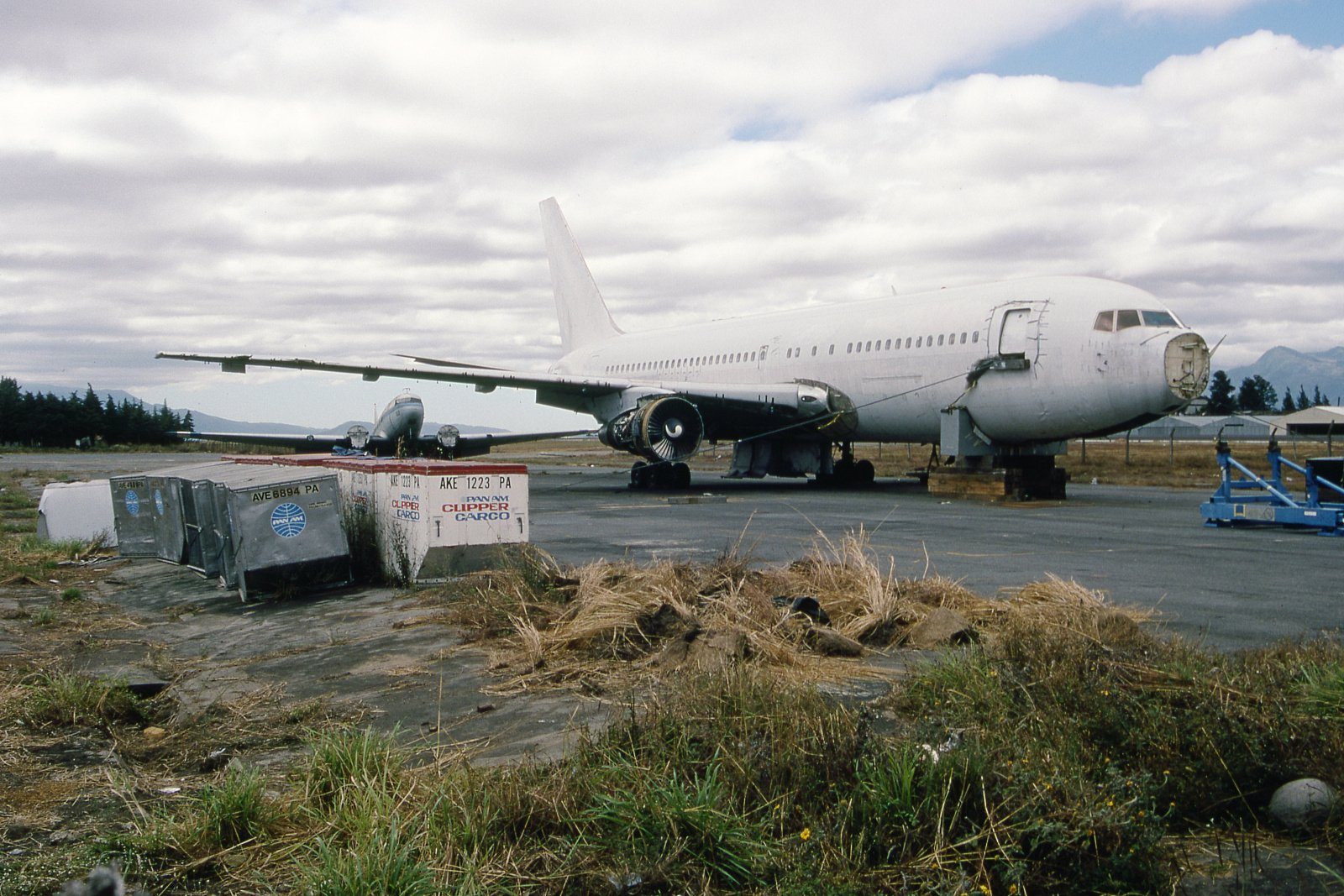
The aircraft photographed, eight months after the accident
