= Mentiras (film) =

1988 film by Abel Salazar and Alberto Mariscal

- Directed by: Abel Salazar; Alberto Mariscal
- Screenplay by: Fernando Galiana
- Story by: Fernando Galiana
- Produced by: Carlos Amador; Fernando de Fuentes
- Starring: Lupita D'Alessio; Juan Ferrara; Jorge Ortiz de Pinedo
- Cinematography: José Ortiz Ramos
- Edited by: Jesús Paredes
- Music by: Guillermo Méndez Guiú
- Production company: Producciones Carlos Amador
- Distributed by: Televicine
- Release date: 1988 (Mexico)
- Running time: 100 minutes
- Country: Mexico
- Language: Spanish

Mentiras (English: "Lies") is a 1988 Mexican drama film directed by Abel Salazar and Alberto Mariscal and starring Lupita D'Alessio, Juan Ferrara and Jorge Ortiz de Pinedo. It was filmed in 1986 and released in 1988.

== Plot ==
A singer for commercials (D'Alessio) looking for her big break manages to attract the attention of a producer (Ferrara) while making friends with a down-on-his-luck musician (Ortiz de Pinedo). Falling in love and trouble seem inevitable.

== Cast ==
- Lupita D'Alessio as Lupita Montero
- Juan Ferrara as Alvaro Ibáñez
- Jorge Ortiz de Pinedo as Enrique Galván
- Flor Procuna as Angélica
- Rafael Amador
- Humberto Elizondo as Don Gabriel
- Diana Golden as Reporter (as Diana Gold)

== Release ==
The film was released on cinemas for sixteen weeks.

== Reception ==
Cinémas d'Amérique Latine said that the film "adorned itself with an aesthetic worthy of the most common of soap operas". Some reviews noted the film's feminist themes, with Debate feminista holding it as an example of a film that conveys a narrative of "feminidad odiahombres" ("man-hating femininity"), and Jorge Ayala Blanco in La disolvencia del cine mexicano: entre lo popular y lo exquisito saying of D'Alessio's character that "the fiery Lupita is a typically middle-class suburban phenomenon".

Some reviews also described the film as a star vehicle for Lupita D'Alessio, but that it failed in that task. Ayala Blanco said, "Mentiras becomes, within the Mexican residual cinema with massive prefabricated success, a television by-product whose primary function is the expansion (failed), extension (diminished), applause (deaf), translation to celluloid (vain), and reinforcement (tautological) of a character produced by TV that does not necessarily have to be operative outside its scope.", and Dicine magazine would refer to the film as "that mess called Mentiras with which Lupita D'Alessio tried to inject oxygen into her devalued career".
