= Quetzaltenango Airport =

Airport serving the city of Quetzaltenango, Guatemala

Los Altos Airport Aeropuerto Los Altos
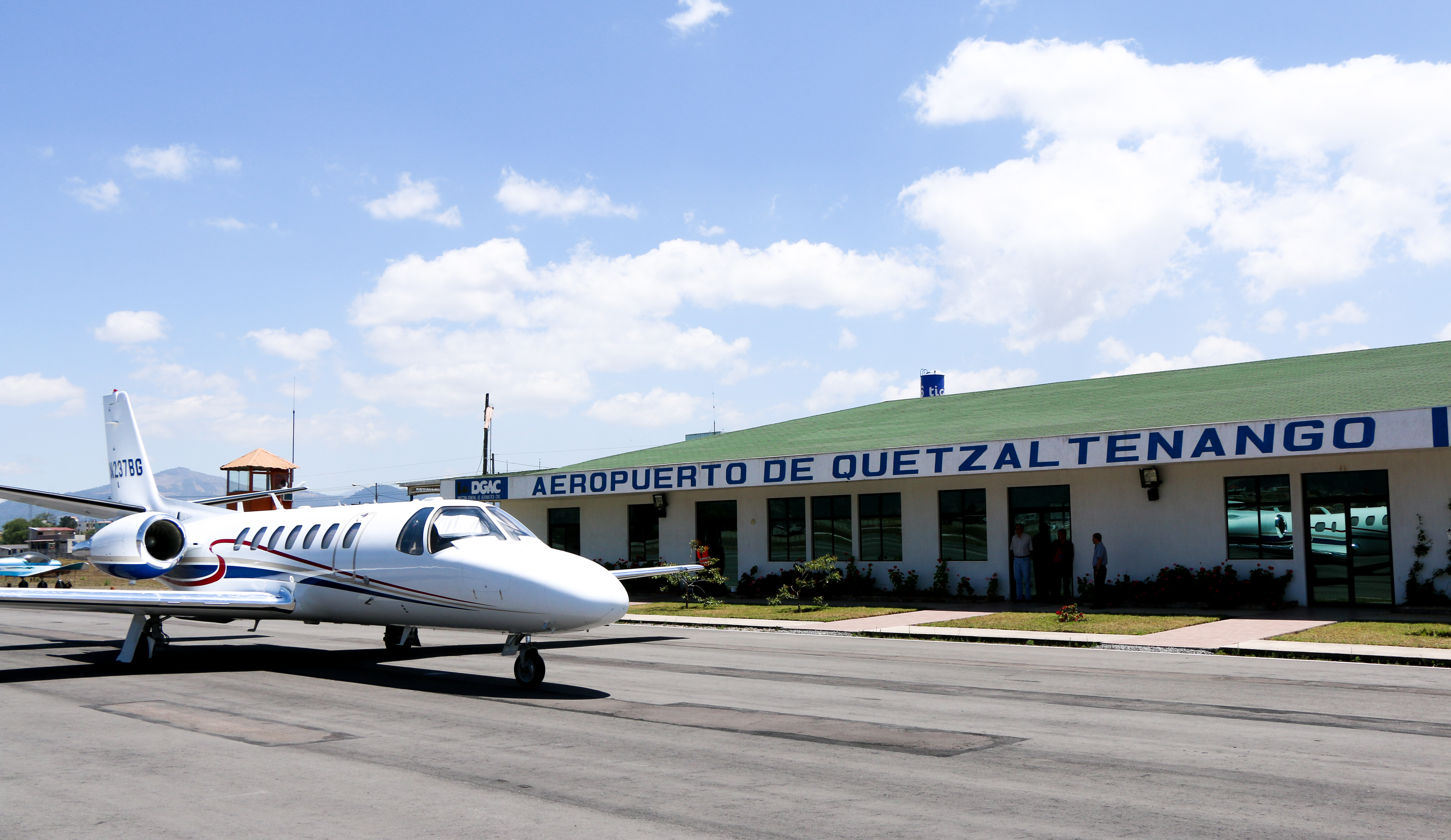
- IATA: AAZ; ICAO: MGQZ

Summary
- Airport type: Public
- Operator: DGAC
- Serves: Quetzaltenango, Guatemala
- Elevation AMSL: 7,779 ft (2,371 m)
- Coordinates: 14°51′55″N 91°30′10″W

Map
- Location in Quetzaltenango Department Location in Guatemala

Runways
Direction	Length		Surface
Direction	m	ft	Surface
05/23	2,103	6,900	Asphalt

Statistics (2022)
- Passengers: 9,022
- Aircraft operations: 2,800
- Source: GCM, DGAC

Los Altos Airport (Spanish: Aeropuerto Los Altos, IATA: AAZ, ICAO: MGQZ), also known as Quetzaltenango Airport, serves the city of Quetzaltenango, also known as "Xelajú" or "Xela," and western Guatemala. It is operated and administered by Dirección General de Aeronáutica Civil de Guatemala (DGAC). In 2016, the airport handled 2,937 passengers.

== General ==
Los Altos Airport is in a high elevation basin in the Guatemalan highlands, in the northeastern part of the city of Quetzaltenango. There is a mountain ridge 3 kilometres (1.9 mi) north of the runway, and distant mountainous terrain in all other quadrants.

== History ==
The first airport was built in 1945 at La Esperanza and was transferred to the present site in 1955. Aviateca had daily flights between Xela and Guatemala City, charging 25 Quetzal those days.

The airport has undergone construction work as part of a nationwide airport rehabilitation program. Serving Guatemala's second largest city, the airport aims to gain international status, along with La Aurora International Airport and Mundo Maya International Airport. The region hopes to profit economically from this new airport. So far, the closest airport to Quetzaltenango with regular airline connections was 200 km (120 mi) away in Guatemala City. Until 2006, the airfield had only a grass runway. It had no significant terminal building and only a small hangar. Air traffic was limited due to lack of features for safe operation. In September 2006 construction work began, which included: extension, asphalting, signposting, and illuminating of the runway and taxiway, construction of a small terminal building and apron for four aircraft, and construction of a parking area.

An emergency operations center has been installed at the airport in order to respond to future disasters like hurricane Stan. The new runway was inaugurated by President Óscar Berger on January 10, 2008.

However, there were criticisms. It was discovered that when Óscar Berger inaugurated the runway in January 2008, construction work had not finished. The temporary runway markings were for the official opening ceremony and had to be removed for final coating. The terminal building was revealed to be only a small house, not a terminal building of international standards as anticipated . The tower has not been built, hence safe operations were questionable.

=== Quetzaltenango 1 ===
In 1992 Miguel Angel Castro Conde father and son constructed a two-seater aircraft in Quetzaltenango, finishing it in 2003 and naming it "Quetzaltenango 1". It is said that it is the first and only ever built airplane in Central America. On May 12, 2003 the first flight occurred lasting 30 minutes, followed by further testing.

== Airlines and destinations ==
Airlines	Destinations
TAG Airlines	Guatemala City

== Accidents ==
On 1 November 1998 a Douglas DC-3 (N3FY) carrying 18 crew and passengers crashed near the airport into mountainous terrain. Bad weather during approach is the probable cause. There were 11 fatalities.

On 13 October 1999 a private Bell 206 helicopter (TG-AMA) crashed near Quetzaltenango. Both occupants were killed.

== See also ==
- Transport in Guatemala
- List of airports in Guatemala
