= Aviateca Flight 901 =

1995 aviation accident in El Salvador

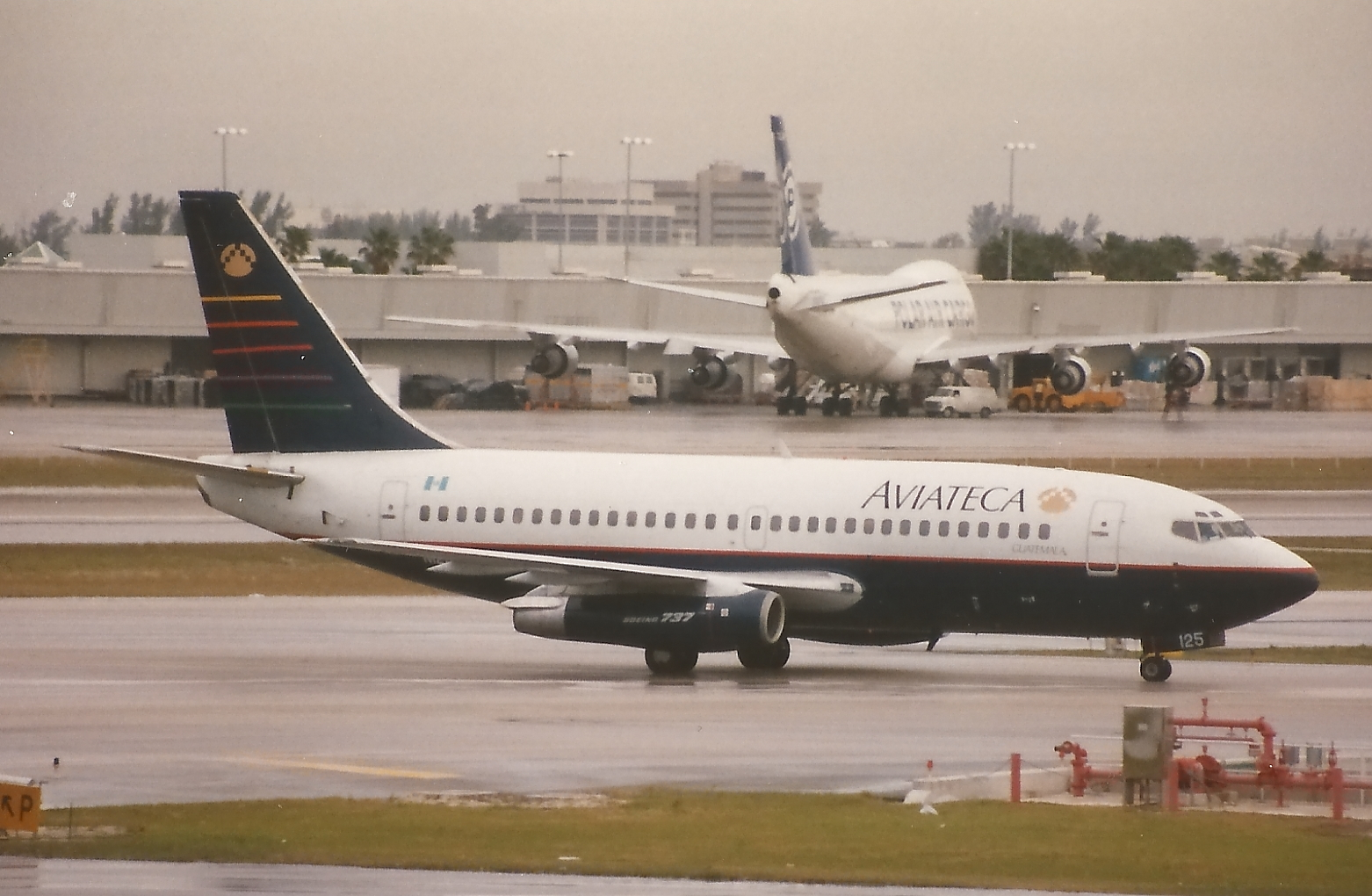
- N125GU, the aircraft involved in the accident, pictured in March 1995

Accident
- Date: 9 August 1995
- Summary: Controlled flight into terrain due to bad weather, pilot and ATC error
- Site: San Vicente volcano, El Salvador; 13°35′57.3″N 88°50′57.9″W

Aircraft
- Aircraft type: Boeing 737-2H6
- Operator: Aviateca
- IATA flight No.: GU901
- ICAO flight No.: GUG901
- Call sign: AVIATECA 901
- Registration: N125GU
- Flight origin: Miami International Airport, Miami, United States
- 1st stopover: La Aurora International Airport, Guatemala City, Guatemala
- 2nd stopover: Comalapa International Airport, San Salvador, El Salvador
- Last stopover: Augusto C. Sandino International Airport Managua, Nicaragua
- Destination: Juan Santamaría International Airport San José, Costa Rica
- Occupants: 65
- Passengers: 58
- Crew: 7
- Fatalities: 65
- Survivors: 0

Aviateca Flight 901 was a scheduled international passenger flight which crashed into the 7,159-foot (2,182 m) San Vicente volcano in El Salvador of a Boeing 737-200 on approach to the Comalapa International Airport on 9 August 1995. The accident killed all 65 passengers and crew on board and is the deadliest aviation disaster to occur in El Salvador. An investigation by the Civil Aviation Authority determined that pilot error and air traffic control error in bad weather contributed to the accident.

== Background ==
Aviateca Flight 901 was operated by a Boeing 737-2H6 (registration number: N125GU) acquired in March 1995. At the time of the accident, the aircraft had logged 16,645 flight hours and 20,323 flight cycles (takeoffs and landings). The IATA flight number was GU901.

The captain was 39-year-old Axel Byron Miranda Herrera and the first officer was 36-year-old Víctor Francisco Sandoval Salguero. Both pilots were retired pilots of the Guatemalan Air Force; the captain served in the air force from 1976 to 1986 while the first officer served from 1980 to 1991. The captain joined Aviateca in 1986 and the first officer joined the airline in 1992. Miranda had 9,828 flight hours while Sandoval had 4,696 flight hours. There were 58 passengers and 7 crew members on board the flight. The passengers onboard the Guatemala City–San Salvador leg of the flight included 16 Mexicans, 11 Guatemalans, 6 Norwegians, 5 Americans, 5 Nicaraguans, 4 Costa Ricans, 2 Danes, 2 Brazilians, and 7 passengers of unknown origin. Two foreign ambassadors to Nicaragua were on the flight: Palle Marker from Denmark and Genaro Antonio Mucciolo from Brazil. Two retired Federal Aviation Administration inspectors were also onboard.

== Accident ==
Flight 901 originated at Miami International Airport in Miami, United States and its destination was Juan Santamaría International Airport in San José, Costa Rica; it had three stopovers on its route: La Aurora International Airport in Guatemala City, Guatemala, Comalapa International Airport in San Salvador, El Salvador, and Augusto C. Sandino International Airport in Managua, Nicaragua.

The flight departed Miami on 9 August 1995 bound for Guatemala City. Its departure from Guatemala City was delayed by 2 hours, taking off at 6:20 p.m. CST. Due to heavy rain and thunderstorms in the area, the captain deviated from the standard approach to Comalapa International Airport: Airway G346. The captain sought to intercept the ILS glide slope for Runway 07 rather than the typical ILS glide slope for Runway 25. José Alberto Chávez, the air traffic controller on duty, instructed the aircraft to descend to 5,000 feet (1,500 m) without knowing where the aircraft was, as the captain did not inform the controller of the deviation. While at 5,000 feet, the aircraft's ground proximity warning system activated, alerting the pilots that the aircraft was too close to the ground. The pilots applied full power to the engines, but the plane crashed into the San Vicente volcano at around 7:30 p.m. CST, 6 miles (9.7 km) south from the municipality of Tepetitán, and 41 miles (66 km) east of San Salvador, and 12 miles (19 km) northeast of Comalapa International Airport.

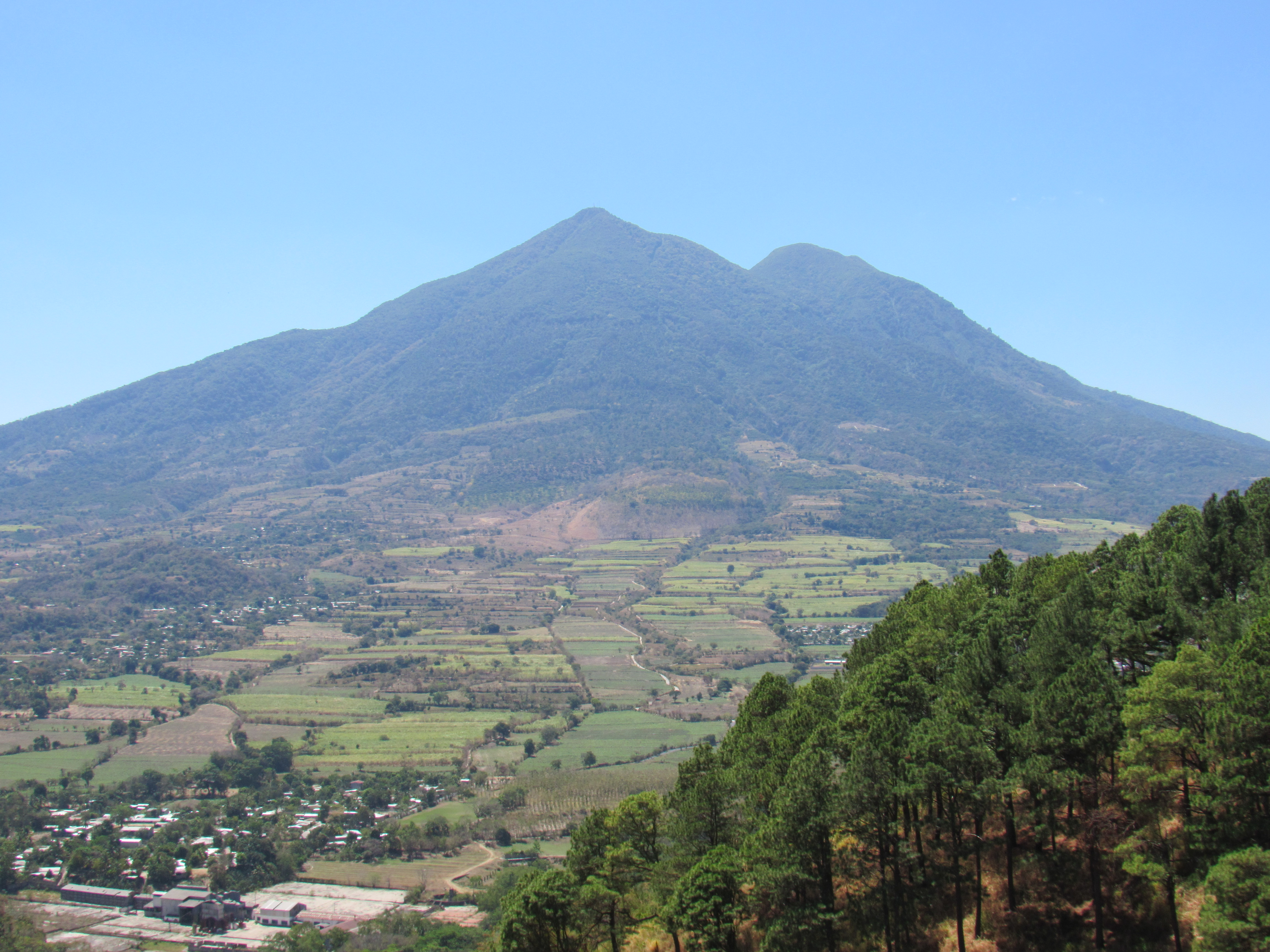
The San Vicente volcano, where Flight 901 crashed

Rescue vehicles were unable to reach the crash site due to poor road conditions and fog also prevented helicopters from reaching the site. The crash site spanned a 500-square-yard (420 m^{2}) area at an altitude of 5,773 feet (1,760 m) MSL. Local police officer José María Gómez stated that "There were corpses wherever you looked, and body parts everywhere [...] on the rocks and in the trees. The plane was totally destroyed". Locals in the vicinity of the crash reported hearing three loud explosions and that they witnessed fire in the sky, with some believing that the San Vicente volcano was erupting. Gladys Miranda de Valencia, the captain's sister, reported that Aviateca had told her that the captain had informed the airline of "unspecified mechanical problems" prior to the accident. Aviateca president Frederick Melville initially attributed the crash to bad weather, and Aviateca spokesman Mauricio Rodríguez stated that it was raining "very, very hard" at the time of the accident.

== Cause ==
Shortly after the accident, the National Transportation Safety Board sent a representative to assist in the investigation, particularly in analyzing the aircraft's cockpit voice recorder and flight data recorder.

The Civil Aviation Authority published its final report regarding the accident on 6 October 1995. It determined that the probable cause was the flight crew's "lack of situational awareness in relation to the 7,159 foot obstruction [the San Vicente volcano]" and its decision to descend. The report also asserted that the airline's crew resource management was ineffective and contributed to the accident.

== Aftermath ==
After the accident, Aviateca offered to pay the families of the victims US$571.42 (then equivalent to 5,000 Salvadoran colones, and equivalent to $1,207 in 2025) each in compensation, but the offer was refused. Both Aviateca and TACA Airlines (the parent company of Aviateca) faced lawsuits from 21 families regarding the accident which were later settled out of court for undisclosed amounts.

In 2003, a court in San Vicente ruled that the controllers on duty were not responsible for the accident.

== Notable victims ==
- Luis Procuna, Mexican bullfighter

== See also ==
- List of deadliest aircraft accidents and incidents
