= Rosario de amor =

Mexican telenovela

- Genre: Telenovela
- Created by: Florence L. Barclay; Tessie Picasso
- Starring: Chela Castro; Pedro Armendáriz Jr.
- Country of origin: Mexico
- Original language: Spanish

Production
- Executive producer: Irene Sabido
- Cinematography: Enrique Gómez Vadillo

Original release
- Network: Canal de las Estrellas
- Release: 1978

Rosario de amor is a Mexican telenovela produced by Guillermo Diazayas for Televisa in 1978.

== Cast ==
- Chela Castro as Elena Palacios
- Pedro Armendáriz Jr. as Pablo Santacruz
- Anita Blanch as Flora
- Fernando Larrañaga
- Graciela Castro
