= Michael Velo =

Norwegian politician

Michael Velo (22 May 1851 – November 1929) was a Norwegian businessperson and politician for the Coalition Party.

Born in Jevnaker Municipality as a son of farmers Erik Olsen Velo and Karen Olsdatter, he graduated from Asker Seminary in 1869 and worked as a teacher until 1882. He then settled in Larvik to become a businessman. He was the manager of Larvik Potetmelfabrikk from 1898.

He was a member of the municipal council of Larvik Municipality from 1889 to 1909, serving eight years as mayor. He was elected to the Parliament of Norway in 1906, representing the urban constituency of Larvik og Sandefjord. With Julius Christensen as running mate, he edged out the Social Democratic candidate and two Liberal candidates (one of these was a totallist). He served only one term. He was also a deputy member from 1895 to 1897 and 1903 to 1906.

Velo was also a board member of Norges Brandkasse and the Bank of Norway branch in Larvik from 1902 to 1927. He chaired Larvik handelsstands forening in 1890–1891 and 1903–1904, and became an honorary member here in 1927. He died in November 1929.
