= Los inconformes =

Mexican telenovela

- Genre: Telenovela
- Directed by: Pepe Morris
- Country of origin: Mexico
- Original language: Spanish

Production
- Producer: Pepe Morris

Original release
- Network: Telesistema Mexicano
- Release: 1968

Los inconformes is a Mexican telenovela, produced by Televisa and originally transmitted by Telesistema Mexicano.

== Cast ==
- Columba Domínguez
- Carlos Ancira
- Carlos Nieto
- Bertha Moss
