= Lowell Yerex =

New Zealand businessman (1895–1968)

Lowell Yerex (24 July 1895 – 1968) was a New Zealand-born aviator and airline industry executive.

Yerex was born in Wellington, New Zealand and attended Valparaiso University in Valparaiso, Indiana. He graduated from Valparaiso University in 1916. He volunteered for the British Royal Flying Corps in 1917, was shot down over France and spent four months in a German prisoner-of-war camp.

In 1924 he was put in charge of a small New Zealand force and was sent to Honduras to deal with the second Honduran Civil War.

In 1931, he founded Transportes Aéreos Centro Americanos (TACA), but was forced out at the end of 1945. He went on to found British West Indian Airways in Trinidad and Tobago in 1940, at the invitation of Lady Young, wife of Trinidad and Tobago's new governor Sir Hubert Winthrop Young.

In 1941, he founded Aerovias Brasil in Rio de Janeiro. After several mergers and acquisitions, the successor companies were eventually acquired by VARIG in 1961.

Yerex died in Buenos Aires, Argentina in 1968.
