= Uaxactun Airport =

- IATA: UAX; ICAO: none

Summary
- Serves: Uaxactun, Guatemala
- Elevation AMSL: 573 ft (175 m)
- Coordinates: 17°23′35″N 89°38′05″W

Map
- Location in Petén Department Location in Guatemala

Runways
Direction	Length		Surface
Direction	m	ft	Surface
04/22	300	984	Grass
- Sources: OurAirports ASN

Uaxactun Airport (IATA: UAX) is an airstrip in the village of Uaxactun, Guatemala.

The airstrip may be closed. Aerial imagery (Google Earth 3/27/2014) shows less than 300 metres (980 ft) of grass landing area remaining unobstructed by trees and structures.

The Tikal VOR-DME (Ident: TIK) is located 31.8 nautical miles (58.9 km) south-southwest of Uaxactun.

== See also ==
- Transport in Guatemala
- List of airports in Guatemala
