= San Vicente (volcano) =

Stratovolcano in El Salvador

- Chichontepec
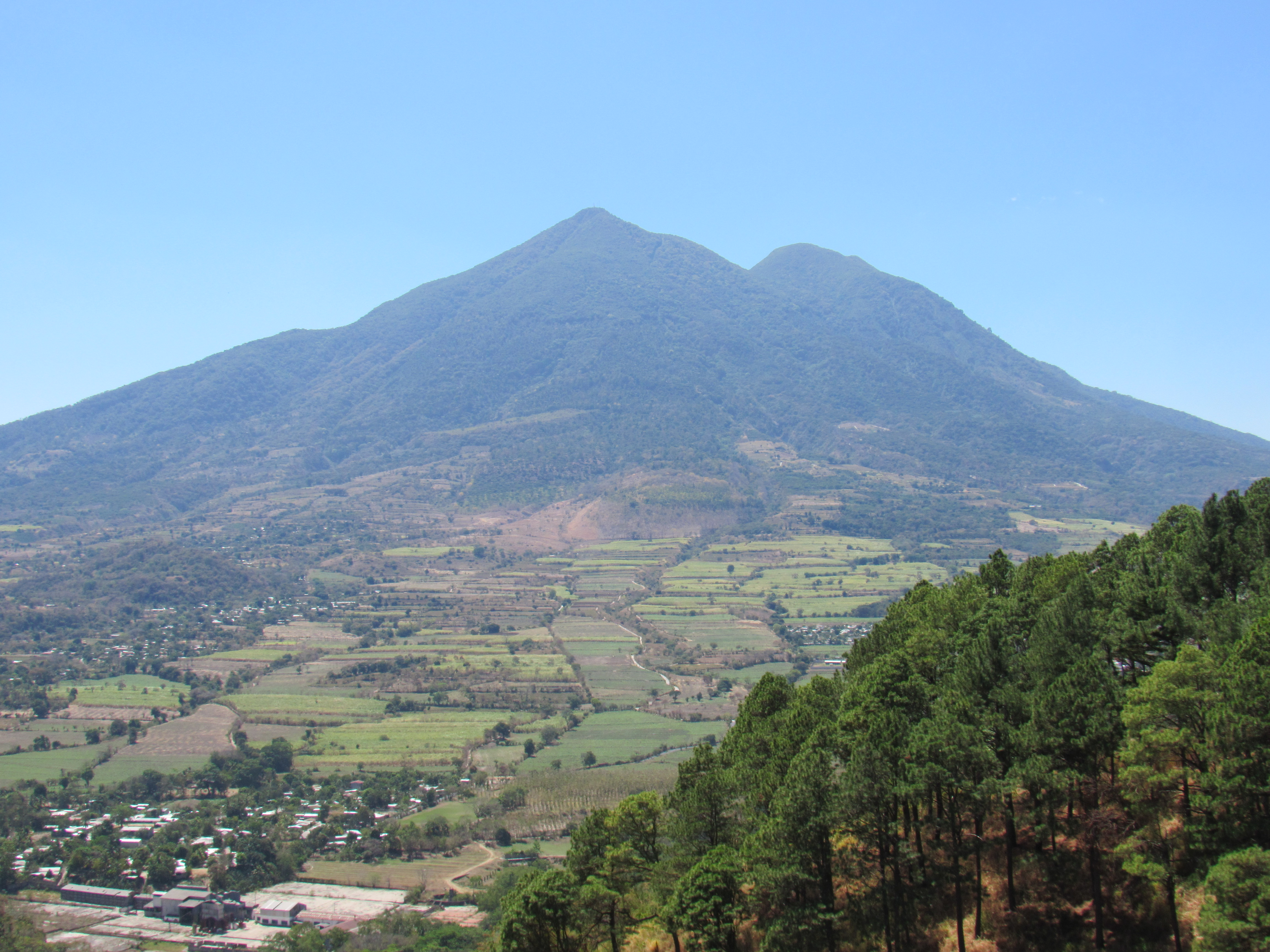
- San Vicente in 1994

Highest point
- Elevation: 2,182 m (7,159 ft)
- Listing: Breast-shaped hills
- Coordinates: 13°35′42″N 88°50′13″W

Geography
- Location within El Salvador
- Location: El Salvador

Geology
- Mountain type: Stratovolcano
- Volcanic arc: Central America Volcanic Arc
- Last eruption: Unknown

San Vicente (also known as Chichontepec or Las Chiches) is a stratovolcano in central El Salvador. It is located next to the town of San Vicente (hence the name) and is the second highest volcano in El Salvador. In the indigenous language Nahuat, Chichontepec means the mountain of the two breasts, because its double summit resembles a woman's bosom. The volcano has two craters, one located in each summit, although not exactly at the top. A dense jungle covers both summits. Numerous hot springs and fumaroles are found on the northern and western flanks of the volcano. To the northeast, at 820 metres in a ravine of 180 metres longitude, there are fumaroles—fountains of clear and muddy water or small volcanoes of mud.

The last significant eruption occurred more than 1,700 years ago. The volcano may have had a very long history of repeated, and sometimes violent, eruptions, and at least once a large section of the volcano collapsed in a massive landslide.

On August 9, 1995, Aviateca Flight 901 crashed at the volcano, killing all 65 people on board.

== See also ==
- List of volcanoes in El Salvador
- List of stratovolcanoes
- Breast-shaped hill
