= List of companies of El Salvador =

Location of El Salvador

El Salvador is the smallest and the most densely populated country in Central America. El Salvador's capital and largest city is San Salvador. As of 2015, the country had a population of approximately 6.83 million, consisting largely of Mestizos of European and Indigenous American descent.

El Salvador's economy was historically dominated by agriculture, beginning with the indigo plant (añil in Spanish), the most important crop during the colonial period, and followed thereafter by coffee, which by the early 20th century accounted for 90 percent of export earnings. El Salvador has since reduced its dependence on coffee and embarked on diversifying the economy by opening up trade and financial links and expanding the manufacturing sector. The colón, the official currency of El Salvador since 1892, was replaced by the U.S. dollar in 2001.

== Notable firms ==
This list includes notable companies with primary headquarters located in the country. The industry and sector follow the Industry Classification Benchmark taxonomy. Organizations which have ceased operations are included and noted as defunct.

Notable companies Status: P=Private, S=State; A=Active, D=Defunct
Name	Industry	Sector	Headquarters	Founded	Notes	Status	
Aerolíneas de El Salvador	Consumer services	Airlines	San Salvador	1960	Defunct 1991	P	D
Banco Davivienda El Salvador	Financials	Banks	San Salvador	1891	Part of Davivienda (Colombia)	P	A
Celeste Imperio	Consumer services	Restaurants & bars	San Salvador	1994	Restaurant	P	A
Central Reserve Bank of El Salvador	Financials	Banks	San Salvador	1934	National bank	S	A
Claro El Salvador	Telecommunications	Mobile telecommunications	San Salvador	1999	Part of América Móvil (Mexico)	P	A
El Faro	Media	Mass media	San Salvador	1998	Digital newspaper	P	A
Empresas ADOC	Consumer goods	Footwear	Soyapango	1955	Shoes	P	A
Grupo Poma	Conglomerates	Holding	San Salvador	1919	Hotels, telecommunications, automotive	P	A
La Prensa Gráfica	Media	Mass Media	Antiguo Cuscatlan	1915	Daily newspaper	P	A
Salvadoran Stock Exchange	Financials	Financial Services	San Salvador	1992	Stock exchange	P	A
SIMAN	Consumer services	Retail	San Salvador	1921	Clothing and accessories	P	A
Supermercados Super Selectos	Consumer services	Supermarket Chain	San Salvador	1940	Owned by Grupo Calleja	P	A
TACA Airlines	Consumer services	Airlines	San Salvador	1931	Now part of Avianca (Colombia)	P	A
Telecorporación Salvadoreña	Media conglomerate	Mass media	Antiguo Cuscatlán	1985	Television and radio	P	A
Tigo El Salvador	Telecommunications	Mobile telecommunications	San Salvador	1992	Part of Millicom (Luxembourg)	P	A
Transportes Aéreos de El Salvador	Consumer services	Airlines	San Salvador	1988	Defunct 1994	P	D
Unicomer Group	Consumer services	Retail	San Salvador	2000	Durable goods and electronics retailer	P	A
Veca Airlines	Consumer services	Airlines	San Salvador	2014	Defunct 2017	P	D
Volaris El Salvador	Consumer services	Airlines	San Salvador	2019	Part of Volaris (Mexico)	P	A

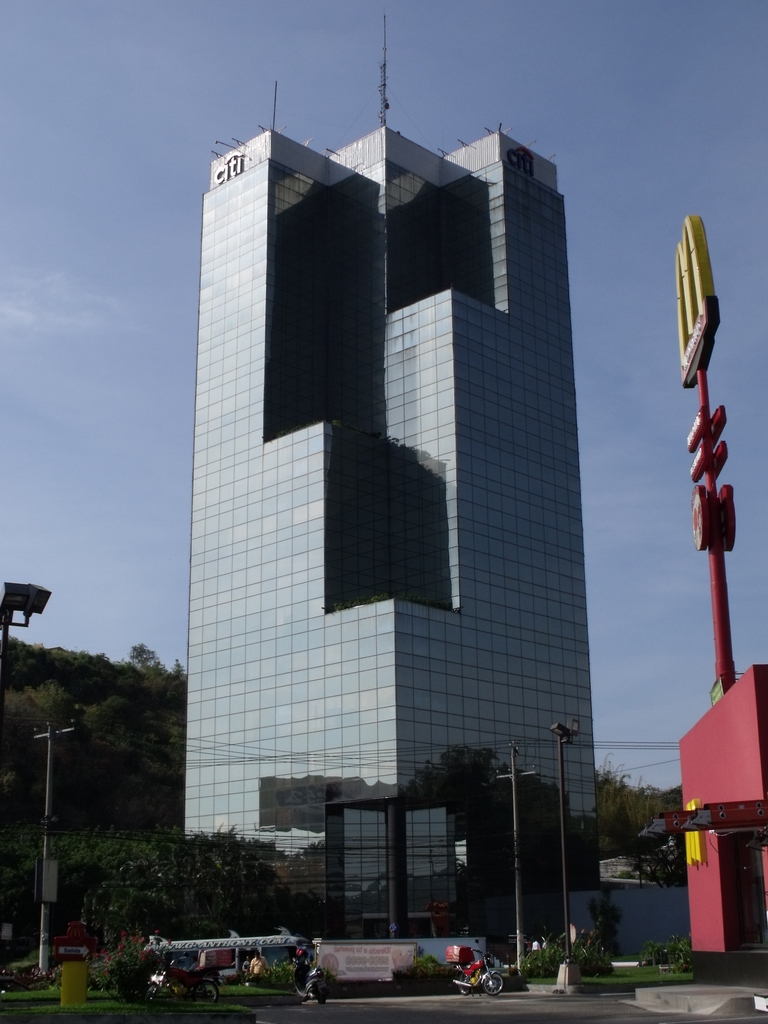
Torre Cuscatlán bank building.

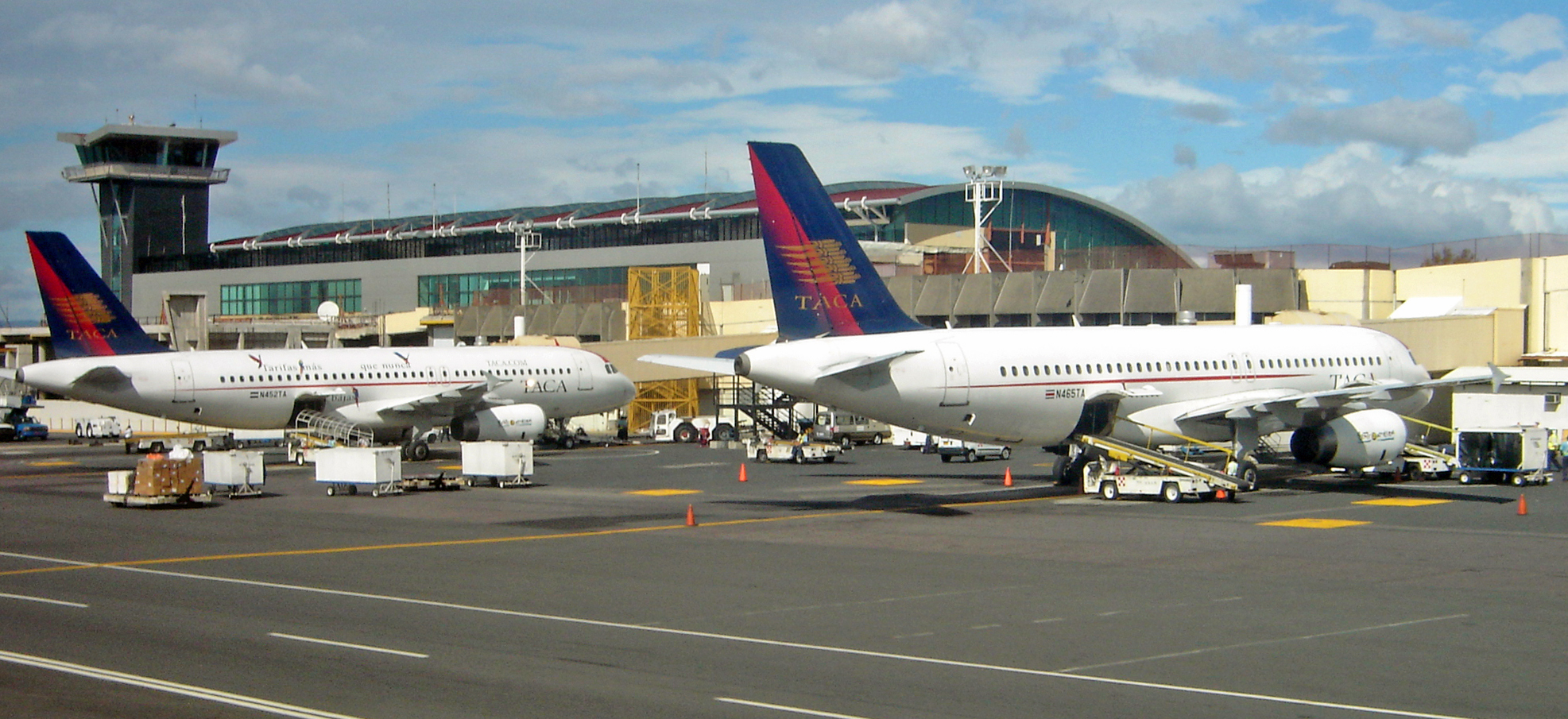
Two Airbus A320 aircraft from TACA Airlines at the Juan Santamaría International Airport.

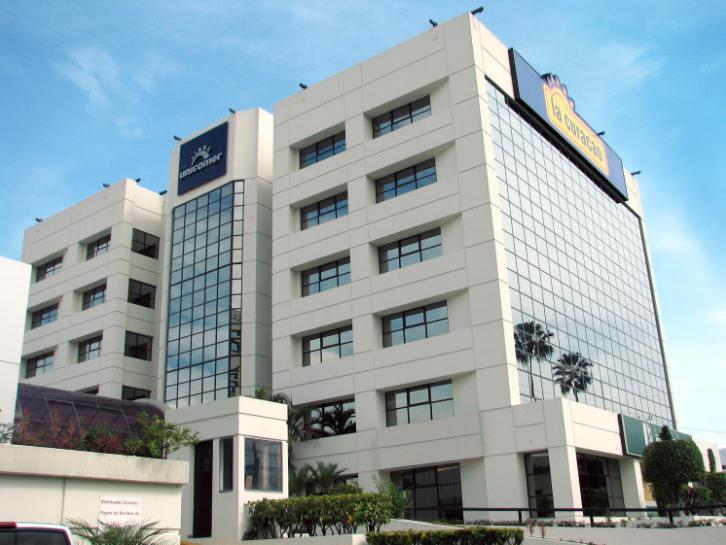
Unicomer Group headquarters in San Salvador.

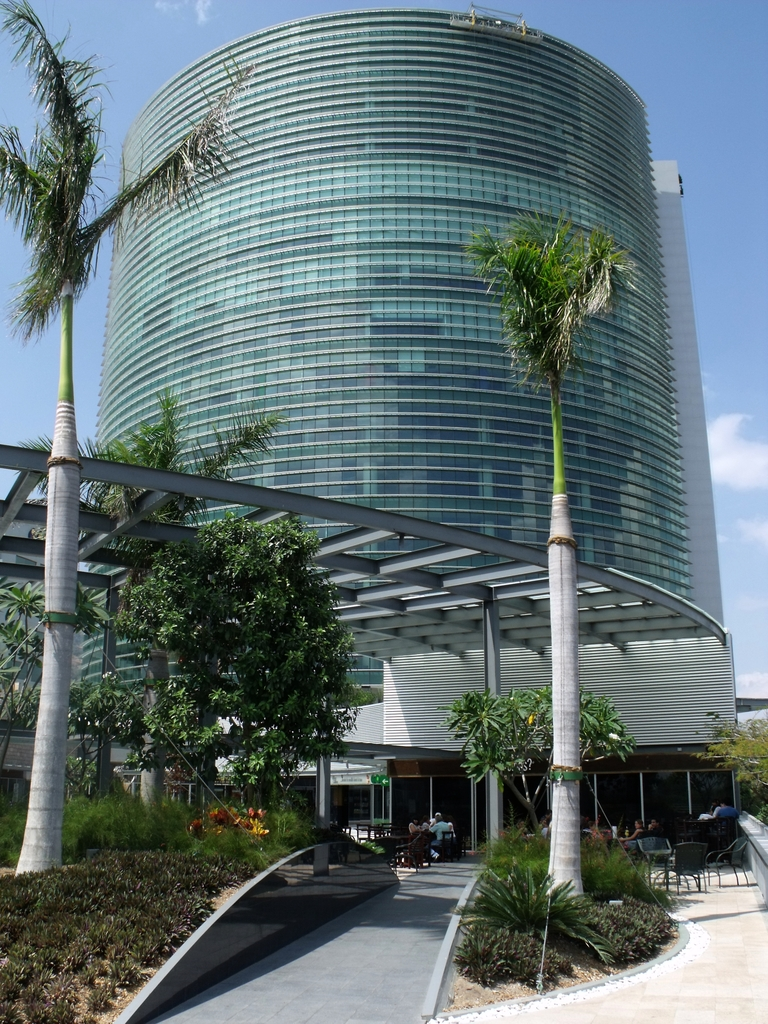
Torre Futura in the World Trade Center San Salvador.
