= List of airlines of El Salvador =

This is a list of airlines operating in El Salvador. Taca Airlines was the major airline and flag carrier of El Salvador. In 2013 Taca Airlines merged with Colombian flag carrier Avianca. Comalapa International Airport is still one of Avianca's hubs, connecting North America, South America, the Caribbean and parts of Europe like Spain.

== Active ==
Airline	Image	IATA	ICAO	Callsign	Founded	Notes
ASL Airlines El Salvador					2023	Planned subsidiary of ASL Aviation Holdings
Avianca El Salvador		TA	TAI	TACA	2013	
Transportes Aéreos de El Salvador			TES	TAES	1988	
Volaris El Salvador		N3	VOS	JETSAL	2019	

== Defunct ==
Airline	Image	IATA	ICAO	Callsign	Founded	Ceased operations	Notes
Aerolíneas de El Salvador		SZ	SZA	AESA	1960	1991	
AeroPuma		6P	APU	AEROPUMA	1985	1997	
Aerovias Latino Americanas					1947	1947	
El Sal Air			ELS	EL SAL	1989	1996	
Líneas Aéreas Salvadorenas					1995	1999	
TACA International Airlines		TA	TAI	TACA	1931	2013	Rebranded as Avianca El Salvador
Veca Airlines		VU	VAR	VECA	2013	2017	

== See also ==
- List of airlines of the Americas
- List of defunct airlines of the Americas
