= Ilopango International Airport =

Regional airport located in Ilopango, San Salvador, El Salvador

Ilopango International Airport Aeropuerto Internacional de Ilopango
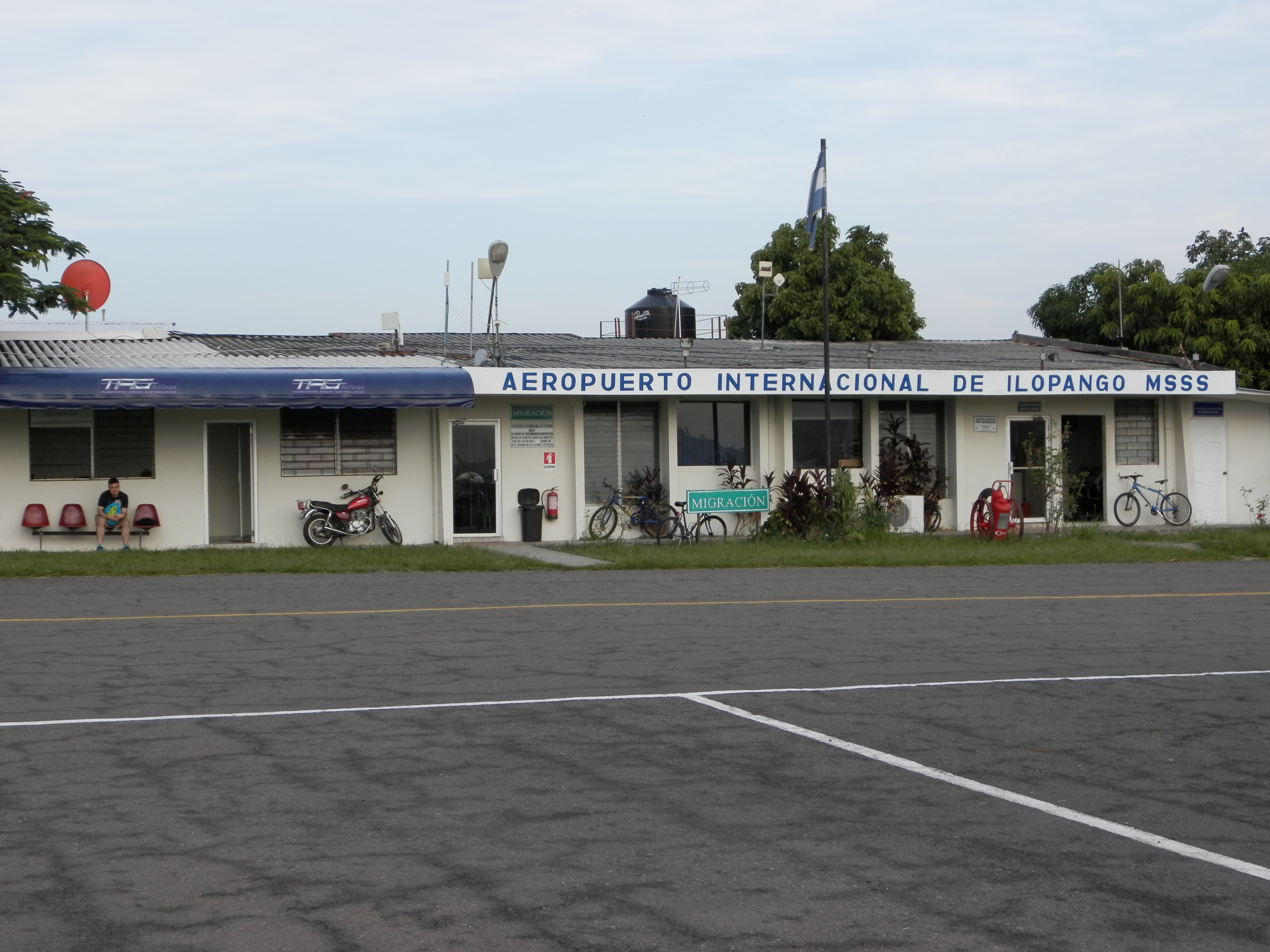
- The airport's old passenger terminal
- IATA: ILS; ICAO: MSSS

Summary
- Airport type: Military and charter
- Owner: Government of El Salvador
- Operator: Autonomous Port Executive Commission (CEPA)
- Serves: San Salvador
- Location: Ilopango, El Salvador
- Time zone: CST (UTC–6)
- Elevation AMSL: 2,027 ft (618 m)
- Coordinates: 13°41′30″N 089°07′32″W

Map
- Location in El Salvador

Runways
Direction	Length		Surface
Direction	ft	m	Surface
15/33	7,349	2,240	Asphalt
~~08/26~~ (closed)	5,095	1,553	Asphalt
- Sources: AIP at COCESNA and DAFIF

Ilopango International Airport (IATA: ILS, ICAO: MSSS) is an airport located on the eastern part of the city of San Salvador, El Salvador, once serving the city as its international airport until 1980 when it was replaced by the larger and more modern El Salvador International Airport, located about 50 km south of the city. Currently, Ilopango is used for military, air taxi, and charter aviation only. It also holds the annual Ilopango Air Show. The airport is also home to the National Aviation Museum (Museo Nacional de Aviación) of San Salvador, which is housed in the old terminal building.

== History ==
A satellite view of the airport

On 27 April 1964, more than 5,000 spectators were present when Pan Am Flight 503 operated by a Boeing 707-321B landed at Ilopango International Airport. It was the first jet airliner to land at Ilopango International Airport.

Ilopango was one of the largest and busiest airports in Central America. During the civil war, due to its location, it was targeted for bombing by guerrillas. It ended its international service in January 1980, with the construction of the larger, more modern Comalapa International Airport. It played a role in the Iran-Contra affair when it was used by the Reagan administration's dummy corporations to fly funding and arms to the Contra rebels in the Nicaraguan Civil War. Currently, there is a plan involving modernization and enlargement of the airport to accommodate modern aircraft. In 2001, the administration of the airport passed from the military to the Comisión Ejecutiva Portuaria Autónoma (CEPA), which is in charge of planning the modernization project.

In 2026, the airport was host to a covert Central Intelligence Agency affiliated Cessna Citation Longitude under the callsign FENIX 701, that the The Washington Post identified as being related to a series of attacks on fishing boats operating near the Galápagos Islands.

== Rehabilitation ==
Ilopango has the same problem of many airports in Central America: it borders on the city and has houses nearby so its runway can't be expanded. Its hangars will be relocated and modernized to serve as a modern commercial airport. CEPA has announced that they will begin rehabilitating the airport in late 2013 to allow short domestic flights within Central America.

Ilopango Airport has new signage on the main runway, and a revamped passenger room, as part of preparations being made for new airlines that will begin operating in May 2014. The President of the Civil Aviation Authority (AAC) has reported that a resurfacing of the airport's taxiway will be underway before initial operations of TAES Airlines in February 2015 and TAG Airlines in March 2015. Volaris is in the process of getting government approval to fly between Mexico and San Salvador.

Among the work completed in the old airport: adequacy of the passenger waiting room, which seats 25 people is completed. In addition to adequate seating for passengers, a new air conditioning system for traveler comfort. These facilities are slated to open in March 2015, when TAG Airlines begins operations at Ilopango Airport.

In January 2016, CEPA began building a new passenger terminal due to the high demands of TAG Airlines and CM Airlines. The new terminal was inaugurated on 7 December 2023. The construction, which cost US$684,000, tripled the airport's passenger capacity.

== Other facilities ==
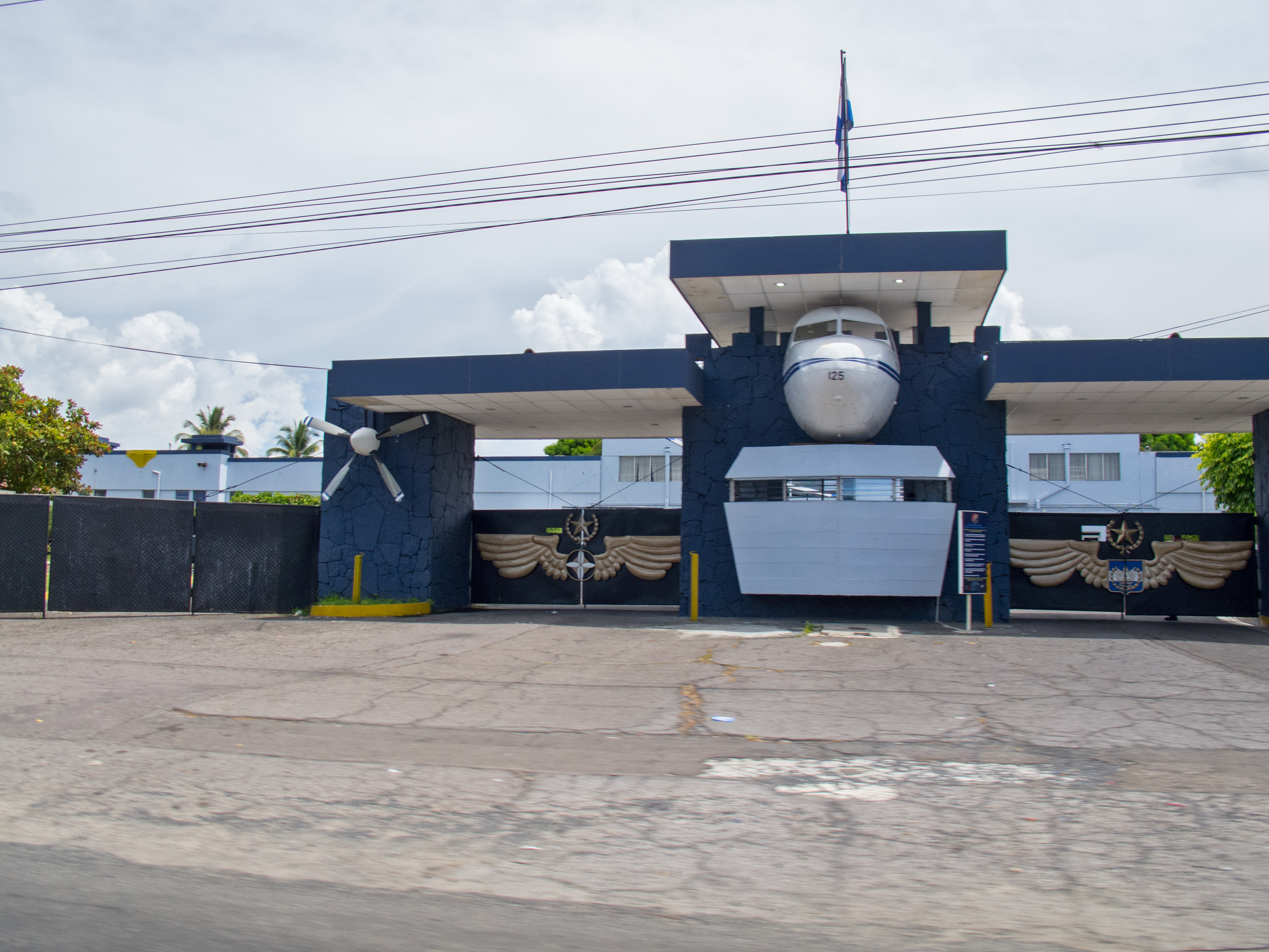
The entrance of the National Aviation Museum

The Salvadoran Civil Aviation Authority has its headquarters on the airport property.

== Airlines and destinations ==
=== Passenger airlines ===
Airlines	Destinations
CM Airlines	Roatán, Tegucigalpa–Toncontín
Transportes Aéreos Guatemaltecos	Guatemala City, San Pedro Sula; Charter: Roatán

== Former airlines ==
- Aviateca (Guatemala City)
- Lacsa (San José)
- TACA Airlines (San Pedro Sula, Tegucigalpa–Toncontín, Guatemala City, New Orleans, Miami, Mexico City, Managua, San José, Panamá, Belize City)
- Copa Airlines (Panama City, Guatemala City, Managua, San José, Cartagena, Barranquilla)
- SAM (San Andrés Island)
- Iberia (Madrid via Santo Domingo)
- LANICA (Nicaragua)
- Pan Am (New York City, Houston–Intercontinental, Los Angeles, Guatemala City)
- Sahsa (Tegucigalpa)
- Transportes Aéreos de El Salvador (San Miguel)

== Accidents and incidents ==
- On 27 March 1926, a Brown 1926 parasol monoplane (registration B-1) operated by the Salvadoran Air Force crashed at the Ilopango Airport with no casualties.
- On 1 December 1938, a Caproni AP.1 (registration 25) of the Salvadoran Air Force crashed at the airport during a test flight. Italian pilot Armando Chipolli died in the crash.
- On 16 September 1943, a Fairchild PT-19B (registration 37) of the Salvadoran Air Force crashed at the airport with no casualties.
- On 30 April 1947, a Douglas C-47-DL of Aerovias Latino Americanas (registration YS-30) collided with a train while attempting to land at the Ilopango International Airport. All four occupants survived but the aircraft was damaged beyond repair by the impact and subsequent fire.
- On 1 May 1986, a Douglas DC-6 of the Salvadoran Air Force (registration FAS302) crashed 1.5 miles (2.4 km) north of Ilopango International Airport after it caught fire. All 37 military personnel onboard the aircraft were killed.

== See also ==
- Battle of Ilopango Airport
- Captain Guillermo Reynaldo Cortez Military Aviation School
