= AeroPuma =

Airline of El Salvador

IATA	ICAO	Call sign
—	APU	AEROPUMA
- Commenced operations: c. 1985
- Ceased operations: 1997
- Headquarters: El Salvador

Aeropuma, S.A., also known as AeroPuma, was a Salvadoran airline that commenced operations in 1985. The airline operated for around 12 years before it went defunct in 1997.

== See also ==
- List of defunct airlines of El Salvador
