= Transportes Aéreos de El Salvador =

Salvadoran airline

IATA	ICAO	Call sign
-	TES	TAES
- Founded: 1988
- Operating bases: Ilopango International Airport

TAES - Transportes Aéreos de El Salvador S.A de C.V. was a Salvadoran charter airline that operates domestic flights within El Salvador. It operates with a fleet of Piper PA-31 Navajos and Piper PA-23 Aztecs. TAES provided flights from San Miguel Airstrip to Ilopango Airport and Comalapa International.

== See also ==
- List of defunct airlines of El Salvador
