= Oakland San Francisco Bay Airport =

Airport in Oakland, California, United States

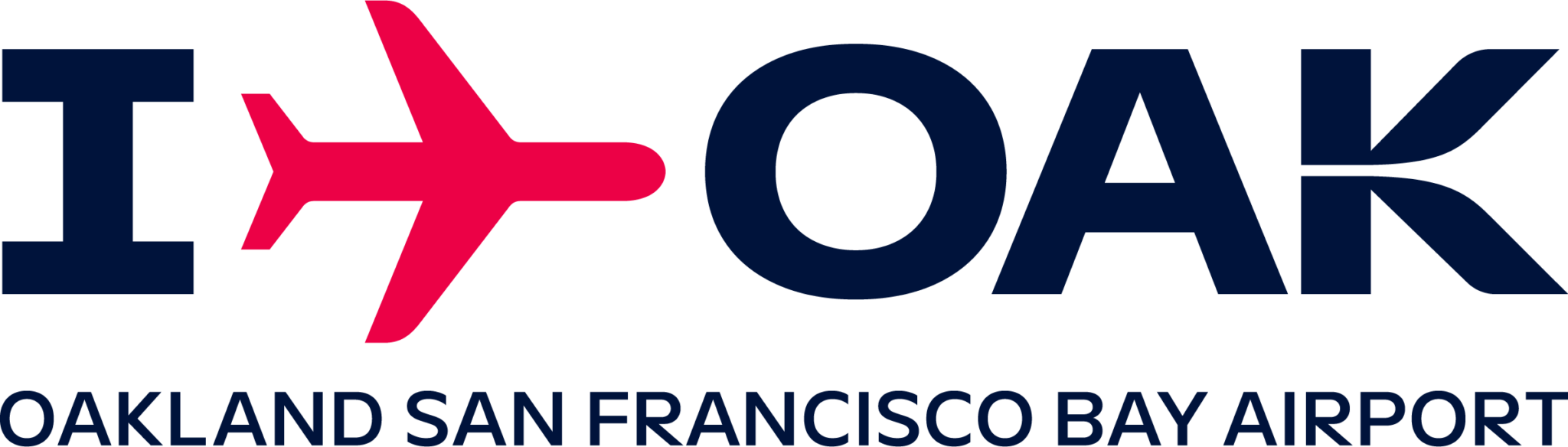

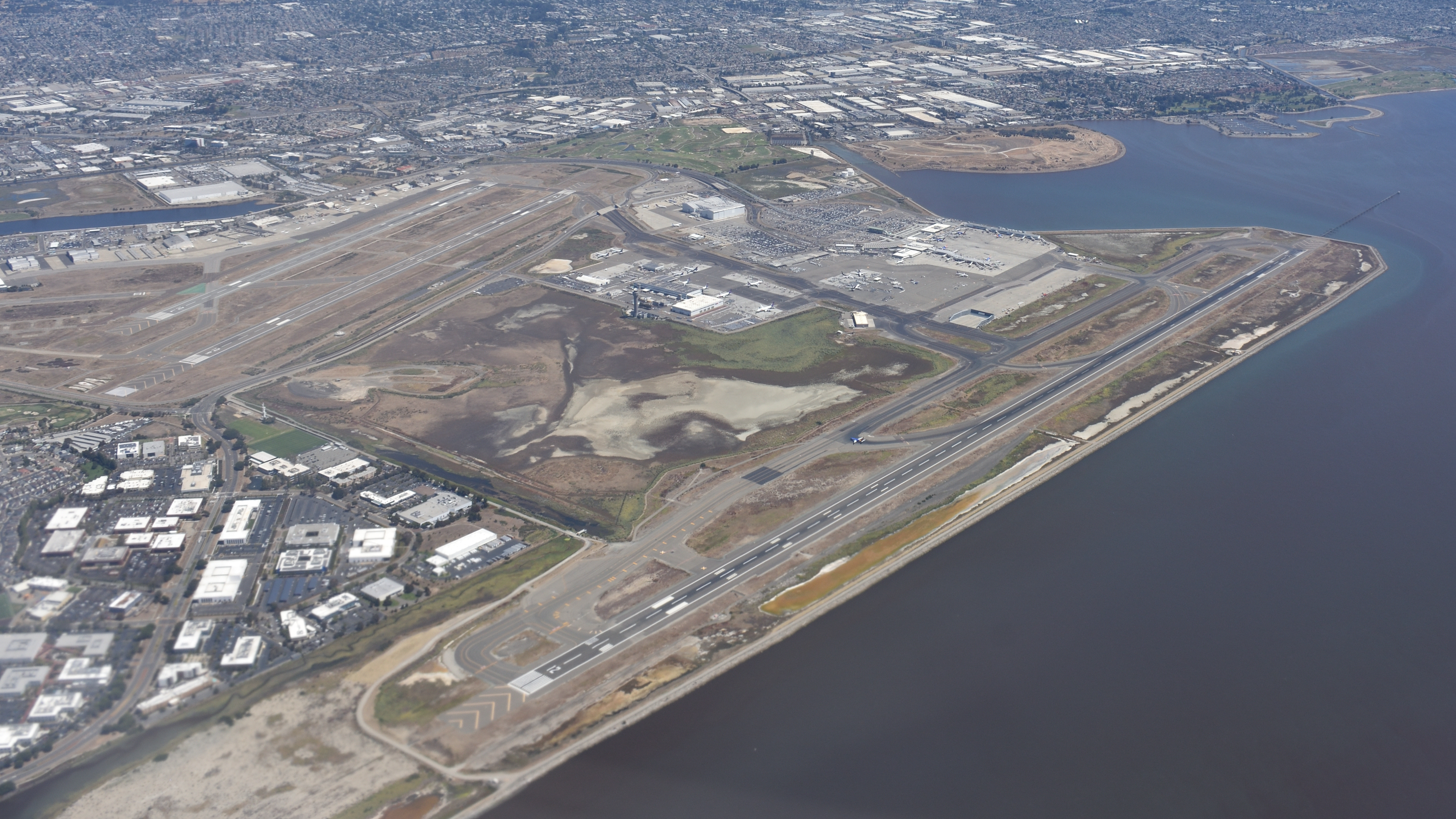
- IATA: OAK; ICAO: KOAK; FAA LID: OAK; WMO: 72493

Summary
- Airport type: Public
- Owner/Operator: Port of Oakland
- Serves: Oakland; East Bay; San Francisco Bay Area
- Location: Oakland, California, U.S.
- Opened: September 17, 1927; 99 years ago
- Hub for: FedEx Express
- Operating base for: Southwest Airlines
- Time zone: PST (UTC−08:00)
  - Summer (DST): PDT (UTC−07:00)
- Elevation AMSL: 9 ft (2.7 m)
- Coordinates: 37°43′17″N 122°13′15″W
- Public transit access: at Oakland International Airport
- Website: oaklandairport.com

Maps
- FAA airport diagram
- Interactive map of Oakland San Francisco Bay Airport

Runways
| Direction | Length | | Surface |
| Direction | ft | m | Surface |
|---|---|---|---|
| 12/30 | 10,520 | 3,206 | Asphalt |
| 10R/28L | 6,213 | 1,894 | Asphalt |
| 10L/28R | 5,458 | 1,664 | Asphalt |
| 15/33 | 3,376 | 1,029 | Asphalt |

Statistics (2025)
- Aircraft operations: 196,017
- Total passengers: 9,210,509
- Sources: FAA

Oakland San Francisco Bay Airport (IATA: OAK, ICAO: KOAK, FAA LID: OAK) is an international airport in Oakland, California, United States. The airport is located seven miles (11 km) south of downtown Oakland and twelve miles (19 km) east of San Francisco, serving the East Bay of the San Francisco Bay Area. The airport is owned by the Port of Oakland and has domestic passenger flights to cities throughout the United States and international flights to Mexico and El Salvador, in addition to cargo flights to China and Japan. The airport covers 2,600 acres (1,100 ha) of land. The airport is an operating base for Southwest Airlines.

== History ==
=== Early years ===
The city of Oakland looked into the construction of an airport starting in 1925. The announcement of the Dole Air Race for a flight from California to Hawaii provided the incentive to purchase 680 acres (280 ha) in April 1927 for the airport. The 7,020-foot-long (2,140 m) runway was the longest in the world at the time and was built in just 21 days ahead of the Dole race start. The airport was dedicated by Charles Lindbergh on September 17. In its early days, because of its long runway enabling safe takeoff rolls for fuel-heavy aircraft, Oakland was the departing point of several historic flights, including Charles Kingsford Smith's historic US–Australia flight in 1928 and Amelia Earhart's final flight in 1937. Earhart departed from this airport when she made her final, ill-fated voyage, intending to return there after circumnavigating the globe.

Boeing Air Transport (a predecessor of United Airlines) began scheduled flights to Oakland in December 1927. It was joined by Trans World Airlines (TWA) in 1932. In 1929 Boeing opened the Boeing School of Aeronautics on the field, which expanded rapidly in 1939 as part of the Civilian Pilot Training Program. Thousands of pilots and mechanics were trained before the facility was changed into the United Air Lines training center in 1945.

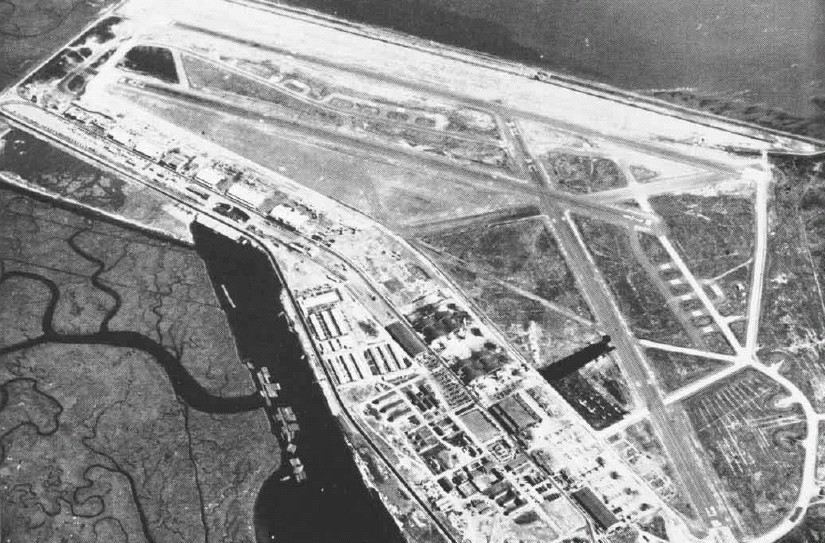
Aerial view of NAS Oakland in the mid-1940s

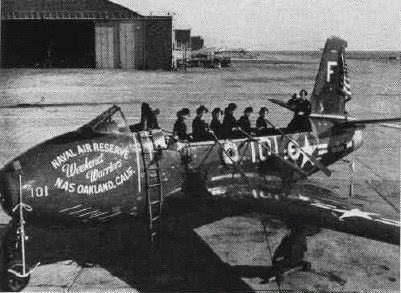
Advertising the Naval Air Reserve at NAS Oakland, 1949

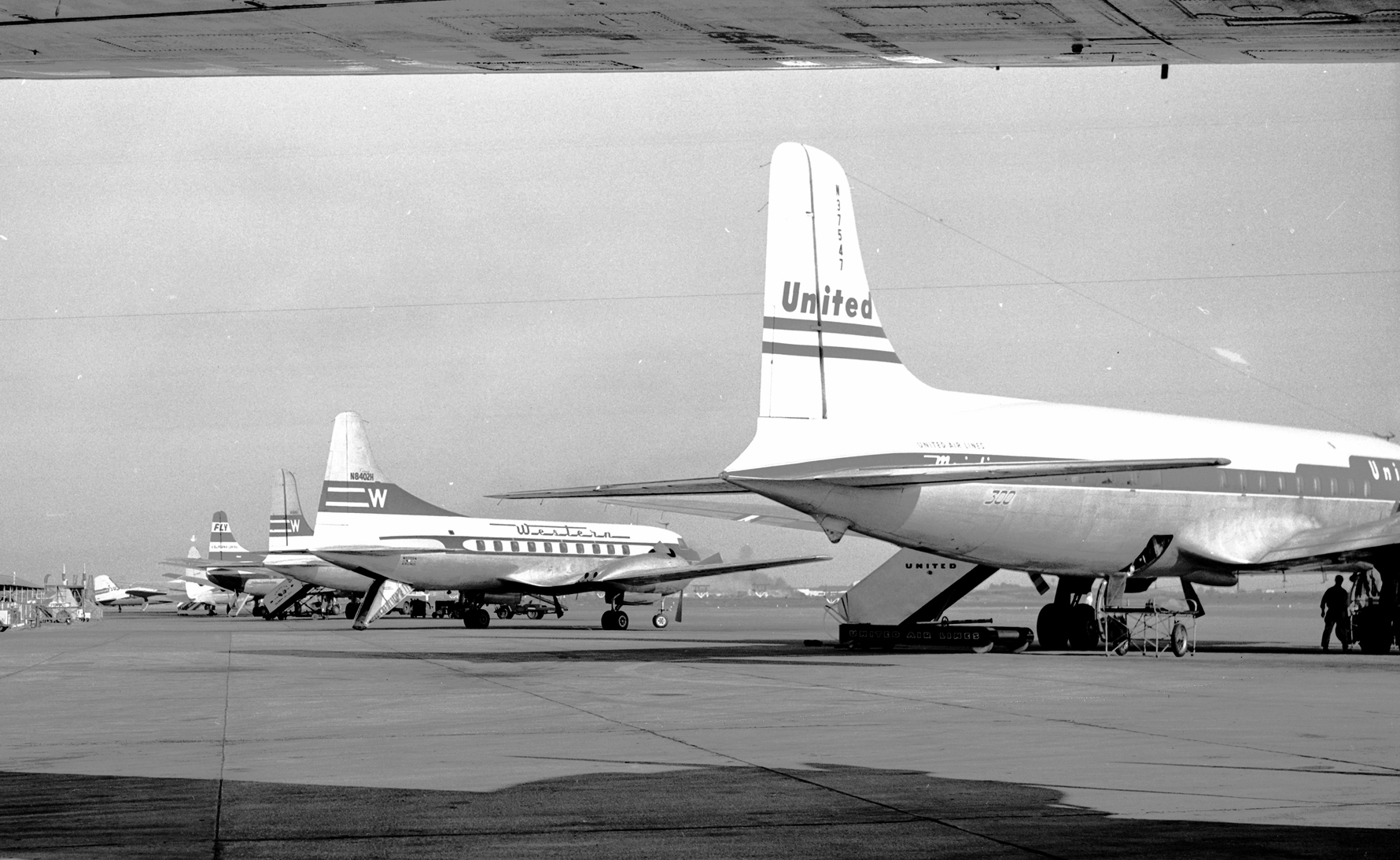
Airliner flightline in 1952

In 1943 the U.S. Armed Forces temporarily took over Oakland Airport and opened Naval Air Station Oakland. It was transformed into an airlift base for military flights to the Pacific islands, ordering all scheduled services to move to San Francisco International Airport. After the war, airlines slowly returned to Oakland; Western Airlines began flights in 1946, and was followed by American Airlines, TWA, United, Transocean Air Lines and Pacific Southwest Airlines (PSA). Oakland became a larger center for non-scheduled and supplemental air carriers: some of the largest such companies were based and headquartered in Oakland including Transocean Air Lines, World Airways, Trans International Airlines, Universal Airlines and Saturn Airways. Other large supplemental carriers, such as United States Overseas Airlines, had operational bases in Oakland. Oakland became one of the largest overhaul and maintenance operations in the country when Aircraft Engine and Maintenance Company (AEMCO) processed thousands of aircraft.

The airport's first Jet Age terminal (now Terminal 1) was designed by John Carl Warnecke & Associates and opened in 1962, part of a $20 million expansion on bay fill that included the 10,000-foot (3048 m) runway 11/29 (now 12/30). The May 1963 OAG showed 15 airline flights arriving in Oakland each day, including nine from San Francisco; in June 1963, TWA flew Oakland's first scheduled jet, a Convair 880, to Chicago. American Airlines scheduled service from Oakland to Phoenix and then into Dallas using the Boeing 720 aircraft. Pacific Southwest Airlines (PSA) provided several flights within California from OAK using Boeing 727 and DC-9 aircraft. United Airlines introduced non-stop service to Chicago and on the San Francisco-Oakland-Los Angeles route using the Boeing 727.

During the Vietnam War, World Airways shuttled thousands of military passengers through Oakland to their bases in Southeast Asia, and an international arrivals facility was built, allowing the airport to handle international flights for the first time. World Airways had broken ground on the World Air Center at Oakland San Francisco Bay Airport. The maintenance hangar could store four Boeing 747s. It opened in May 1973. During its operation, World Airways provided contract maintenance services for 14 airlines in the facility. By 1988, World Airways vacated the Oakland maintenance base and moved its headquarters to Washington Dulles. That same year, United Airlines assumed the lease on the maintenance base.

After the war, Oakland's traffic slumped, but airline deregulation prompted several low-fare carriers to begin flights. This increase prompted the airport to build a $16.3 million second terminal, the Lionel J. Wilson Terminal 2, with seven gates for PSA and AirCal service. In the mid-1980s, People Express Airlines provided scheduled Boeing 747 transcontinental flights from OAK to Newark. SFO Helicopter Airlines served scheduled passenger flights between SFO and the Oakland Convention Center from OAK for many years until 1985. In 1987, British Airways and Air France Concorde visited Oakland to provide supersonic two-hour flights to the Pacific halfway to Hawaii and back to Oakland. Additionally, Concorde returned for a special around-the-world trip covering 38,215 miles over a three-week tour in March 1989.

FedEx Express opened an air cargo base at OAK in 1988, which is now one of the busiest air freight terminals in the United States. In the 1990s, Southwest Airlines opened a crew base in Oakland, and expanded its flights to become the airport's dominant passenger carrier. The airport has international arrival facilities, including U.S. Customs and Border Protection office. The 1990s saw a rise of low-cost carriers serving Oakland, Morris Air (later merged into Southwest Airlines), and MarkAir to name a few, provided several domestic destinations from OAK. During the 1990s, tour operator SunTrips contracted Aerocancun and Leisure Air to provide scheduled charter flights from OAK to sun destinations during the early 1990s. TAESA and Mexicana Airlines also flew between Oakland and cities in Mexico for many years. In the past Tower Air and Corsairfly flew Orly Airport to OAK to Papeete, Tahiti; Martinair flew to Schiphol Airport; and CityBird flew to Brussels Airport.

=== 2000s ===
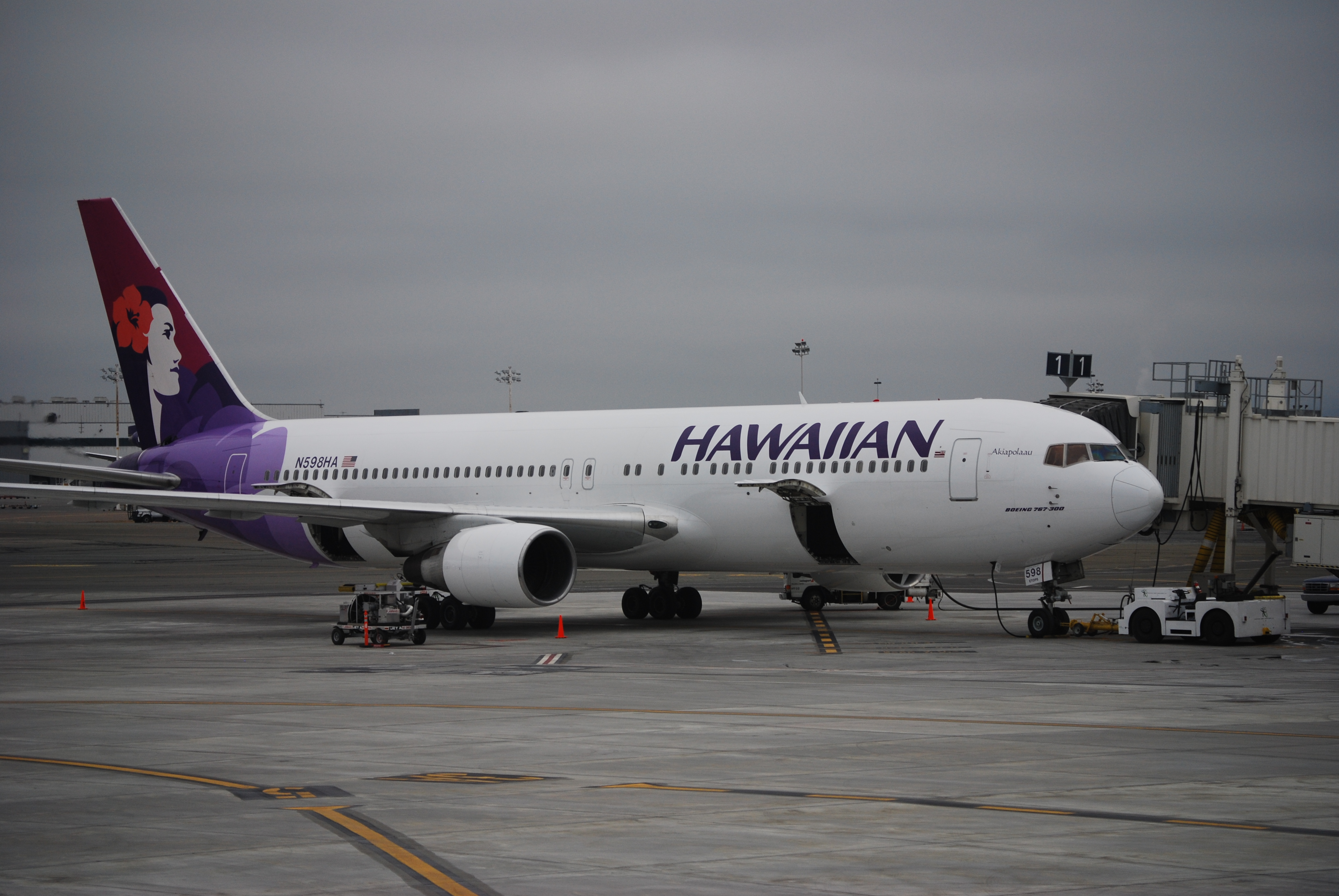
A Hawaiian Airlines Boeing 767-300 at Terminal 1

United Airlines vacated its 300,000 sq ft (30,000 m^{2}) Oakland Maintenance Center in May 2003 and transferred work to its base across the bay at San Francisco International Airport (SFO).

Oakland San Francisco Bay Airport began a $300 million expansion and renovation project in 2004, including adding five gates in Terminal 2. The new concourse partially opened in the fall of 2006, was fully opened by the spring of 2007, and a new baggage claim in Terminal 2 opened in the summer of 2006. The former Terminal 2 baggage claim has been replaced by a renovated and expanded security screening area. As part of this program, airport roadways, curbsides and parking lots were also renovated by the end of 2008.

In 2008, Oakland saw a series of cutbacks due to high fuel costs and airline bankruptcies, more than other Bay Area airports. In just a few days, Oakland's numerous non-stops to Hawaii were eliminated following the liquidation of ATA Airlines and Aloha Airlines, although Hawaiian Airlines started a daily flight to Honolulu a month later. Skybus Airlines stopped flying to Columbus, OH when it ended operations on April 5. American Airlines and Continental Airlines both dropped Oakland on September 3, United Airlines ended service to Los Angeles on November 2.

=== 2010s ===
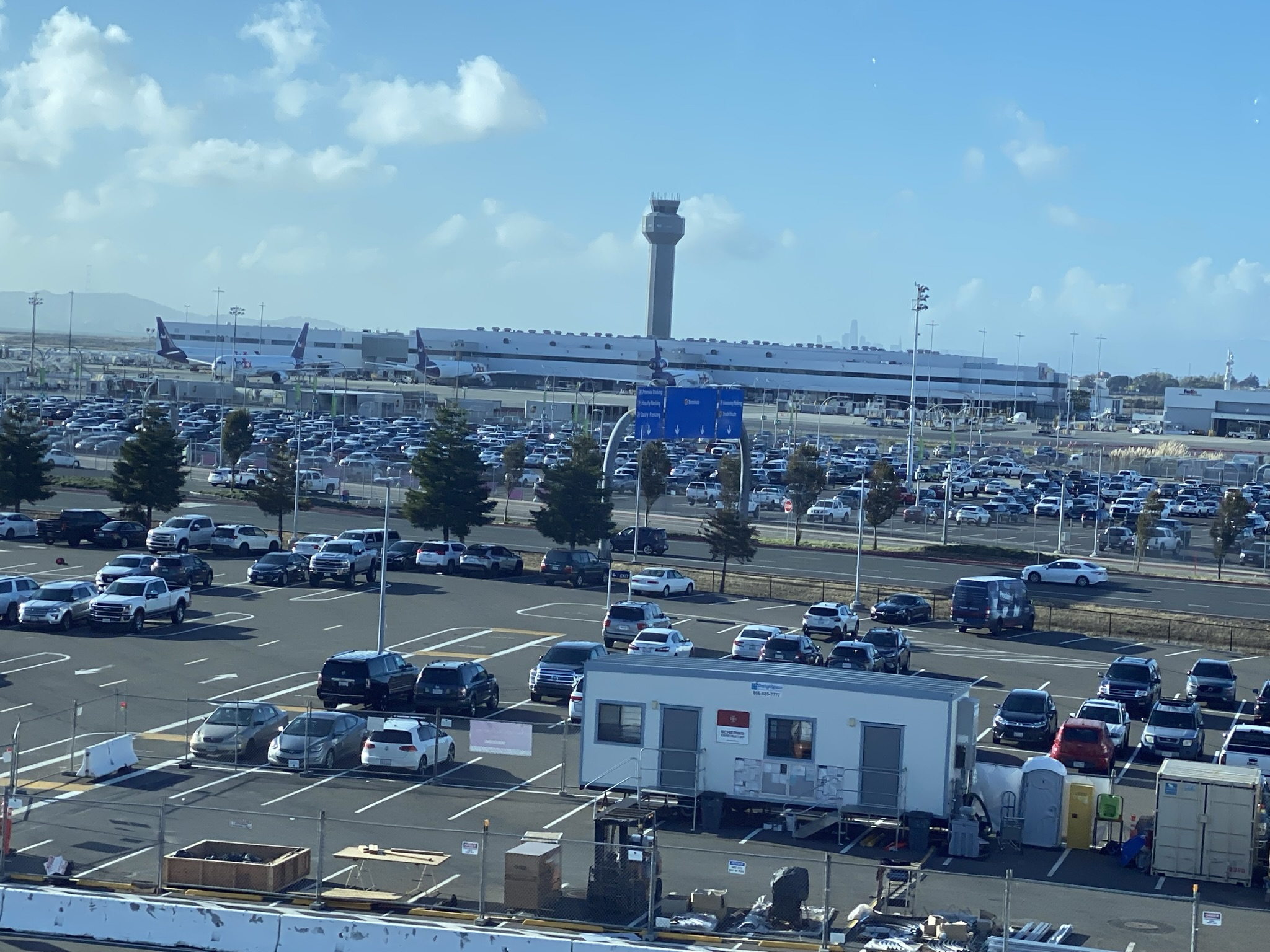
View of the control tower

Following the years of the Great Recession, during which a few airlines were either liquidated (ATA Airlines and Aloha Airlines), or consolidated business to San Francisco International Airport, OAK started a gradual recovery, which has continued through 2017.

In 2009, Allegiant Air moved operations from San Francisco International Airport, before designating OAK as a focus city. After the bankruptcies of ATA and Aloha Airlines, Alaska Airlines and Hawaiian Airlines replaced their nonstop services to Hawaii. In the same year, Volaris began service to OAK as their first destination in the San Francisco Bay Area and held a commercial agreement with Southwest Airlines, until its merger with AirTran Airways in 2011. Malaysia-based AirAsia X honored its new partners, the Oakland Raiders of the National Football League (NFL). AirAsia X had one of their planes full of its executives and crew members "touch down" at OAK in acknowledgement of the to-be-announced sponsorship. AirAsia executives had new optimism that service between the U.S. and the airline's main base in Kuala Lumpur, could possibly happen earlier than originally expected, but has yet to come to fruition as of 2020.

In 2009, OAK had the highest on-time arrival percentage among the 40 busiest North American airports.

In 2011, Spirit Airlines returned to OAK after several years of absence, eventually flying a combined total of seven year-round and seasonal routes by the summer of 2017. Oakland San Francisco Bay Airport also celebrated its 85th anniversary in 2011, commemorating the first transpacific crossing by air from OAK to Hawaii, which took place on June 29, 1927, in The Bird of Paradise, flown by Hegenberger and Maitland. In 2012 United Airlines pulled out of OAK, consolidating operations at San Francisco International Airport, its Bay Area hub. Arkefly (which later re-branded as TUI Airlines Netherlands) chose OAK as a San Francisco Bay Area gateway, flying twice weekly to Amsterdam, via a stop at Los Angeles International Airport. Arkefly provided 18 weeks of scheduled service in the summer of 2012. The airline followed with a similar schedule during the summer of 2013, before discontinuing service at OAK.

In 2013, FedEx Express opened a $30 million upgrade of its hub facility at OAK, including additions to accommodate the airline's new Boeing 777 Freighter fleet. In 2014, Norwegian Air Shuttle announced its first two year-round flights to Stockholm and Oslo airport, using Boeing 787-8 aircraft seating 291 passengers operated by Norwegian Long Haul. The flights were the first-ever nonstop services offered from the two Scandinavian capitals to the San Francisco Bay Area, providing several connections throughout Europe. The Oslo flight was later changed to a seasonal schedule.

A long-proposed extension of the BART system to the airport opened on November 22, 2014, connecting the BART Coliseum station with a station in the parking lot opposite of the airport terminals. The new system consists of a mostly elevated structure, running the length of Hegenberger Road.

In May 2015, Oakland International Airport's Moving Modern program construction commenced a $100 million renovation of the Terminal 1 complex. The project included seismic architectural retrofits in central buildings, replacement and upgrading of infrastructure and improvement of the passenger environment. The project was completed in Spring 2017.

In 2016, Norwegian Air Shuttle announced that nonstop flights would connect Oakland with London beginning the following spring. British Airways responded with their own service to London, with both airlines providing service to London's Gatwick Airport. American Airlines also returned and re-branded, following a merger with US Airways; the latter previously had a short-term presence at OAK, following a separate merger with America West Airlines during the previous decade. Southwest Airlines inaugurated nonstop flights from Oakland to Mexico for the airline's first international nonstop flights from OAK. The additional routes also gave the airline a combined total of 30 year-round and seasonal flights at the airport as of early 2017.

In 2017, Norwegian Air Shuttle announced nonstop flights connecting Oakland with Copenhagen on a seasonal basis from March 28, and Oakland with Barcelona from June 7 to operate year-round. Level, a new carrier owned by IAG, responded with their own Barcelona service, started flights initially operated by IAG partner Iberia on June 2, with both airlines providing service to Barcelona El Prat Airport. In the months following, Norwegian announced in May the introduction of nonstop flights between Oakland and Rome Fiumicino started on February 6, 2018, and in July the introduction of nonstop flights between Oakland and Paris Charles de Gaulle began on April 10, 2018.

=== Recent years ===
Between mid-2018 and early 2020, OAK had both lost and was losing domestic and international nonstop routes; the indefinite grounding of the Boeing 737 MAX by both Southwest and American, the "restructuring" of schedules by airlines, and a lack of demand all contribute to this. British Airways ended service in October 2018. Level moved its operations to SFO, as did Norwegian Air Shuttle for its seven routes serving OAK. Southwest Airlines ended systemwide service with Newark Liberty International Airport in November 2019, followed by discontinuing three more routes with OAK effective January 2020. Three other routes are currently suspended by Southwest until further notice, while American did the same during summer 2019 for service with Dallas/Fort Worth International Airport. Due to the COVID-19 pandemic, JetBlue withdrew operations from OAK in April 2020 while American Airlines withdrew in early June 2020. However, some traffic is returning. In December 2022 Volaris El Salvador announced nonstop flights connecting Oakland with San Salvador beginning the following spring of 2023. In late summer of 2023, Avianca El Salvador announced seasonal nonstop service from Oakland to San Salvador. In September 2023, Viva Aerobus announced nonstop service between Oakland and Monterrey.

In 2024, the airport announced that it was changing its official name from Metropolitan Oakland International Airport to San Francisco Bay Oakland International Airport. The Port of Oakland Board of Commissioners approved the new name on April 11. Among the reasons given for the change were that many travelers do not understand that the City of Oakland is part of the Bay Area and that its airport directly faces San Francisco Bay. Another reason was to reduce the long-running confusion between OAK and Auckland Airport in Auckland, New Zealand. The confusion has been especially severe for Chinese-speaking travelers, because the two cities' names are written identically in simplified Chinese (奥克兰) and must be distinguished by context. On May 9, the Oakland Board of Port Commissioners unanimously voted and granted final approval for the name change. The city attorney of San Francisco, which owns SFO, filed a federal trademark lawsuit against Oakland for the decision. The Port of Oakland filed a countersuit, pointing out that SFO is not located in San Francisco either, but rather in San Mateo County.

On November 12, 2024, U.S. Magistrate Judge Thomas S. Hixson granted SFO's motion for a preliminary injunction and ordered OAK to stop using the new name while the case remained pending. While pursuing an appeal of this preliminary injunction order to the U.S. Ninth Circuit Court, the Port of Oakland Board of Commissioners then approved a new name in July 2025, Oakland San Francisco Bay Airport, stating that they were "putting Oakland first", both literally and figuratively. In reaction, SFO stated that they were "disappointed" and were reportedly considering further legal options.

In 2026, the lawsuit was settled, allowing Oakland to call the airport Oakland San Francisco Bay Airport. As part of the agreement, the city of Oakland cannot highlight the words "San Francisco Bay" in any way. The airport must use "San Francisco Bay" instead of just "San Francisco", and it is not allowed to have the word "international" in its name, despite offering international flights.

=== Proposed developments ===
OAK handled 13.38 million passengers in 2019 but is projecting passenger numbers to reach 20 million by 2028, and 25 million by 2035. To handle this expected growth, the Port of Oakland is considering a major expansion to consolidate and modernize existing terminals while creating a third passenger terminal. This project is in the early stages of planning, with a draft environmental report published in the summer of 2023. The third passenger terminal would be built with up to 25 new gates. Terminals 1 and 2 would be condensed into a single terminal, with fewer gates, shared ticketing, baggage handling, and security. Additionally, customs facilities will be expanded to accommodate additional international flights. A connector will connect the consolidated terminal with the new terminal. A net gain of 16 gates could be added. Also as part of the project, OAK plans to reconfigure cargo facilities and improve roadways, parking, and other support facilities.

== Facilities ==
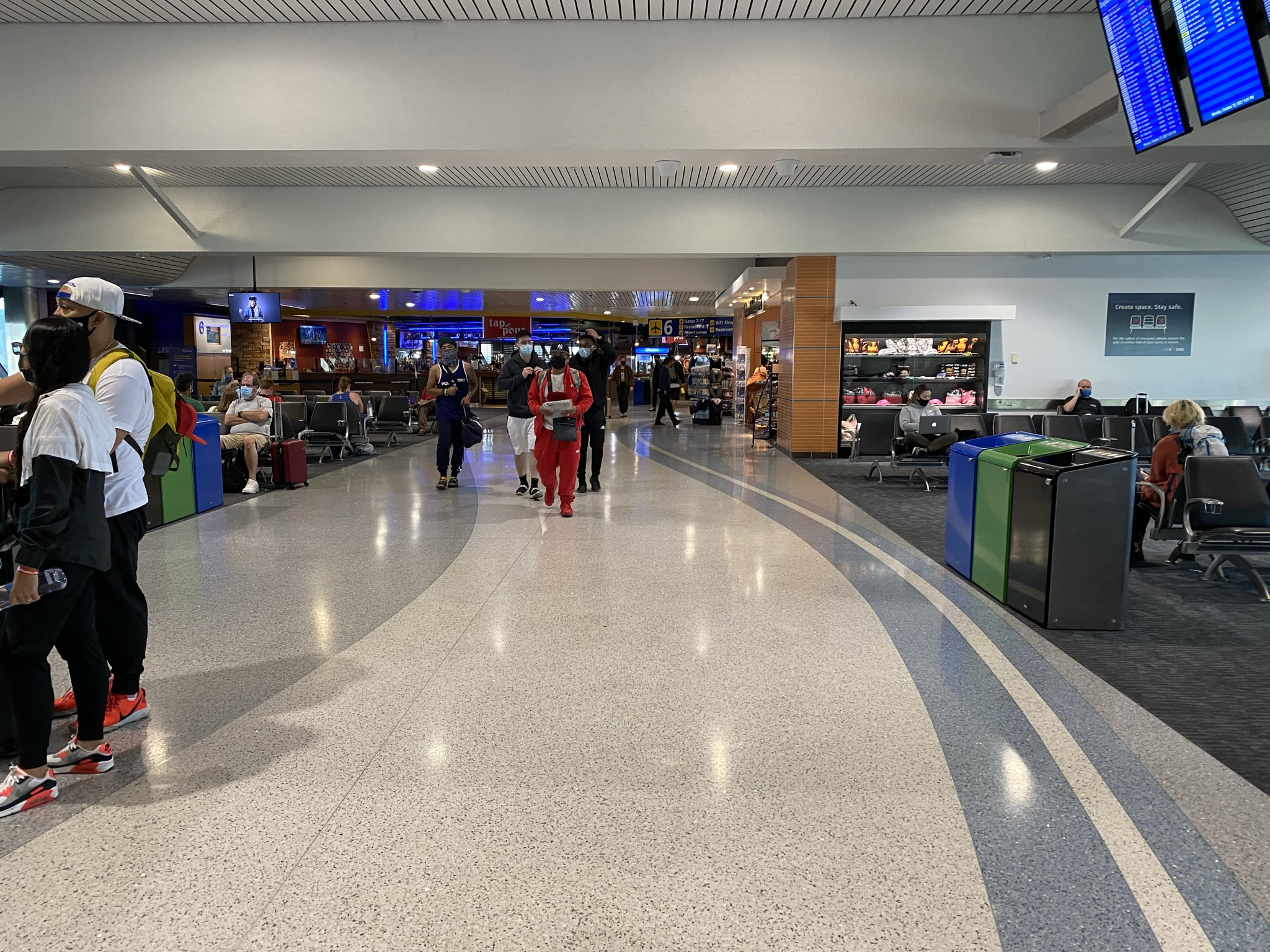
Terminal 1

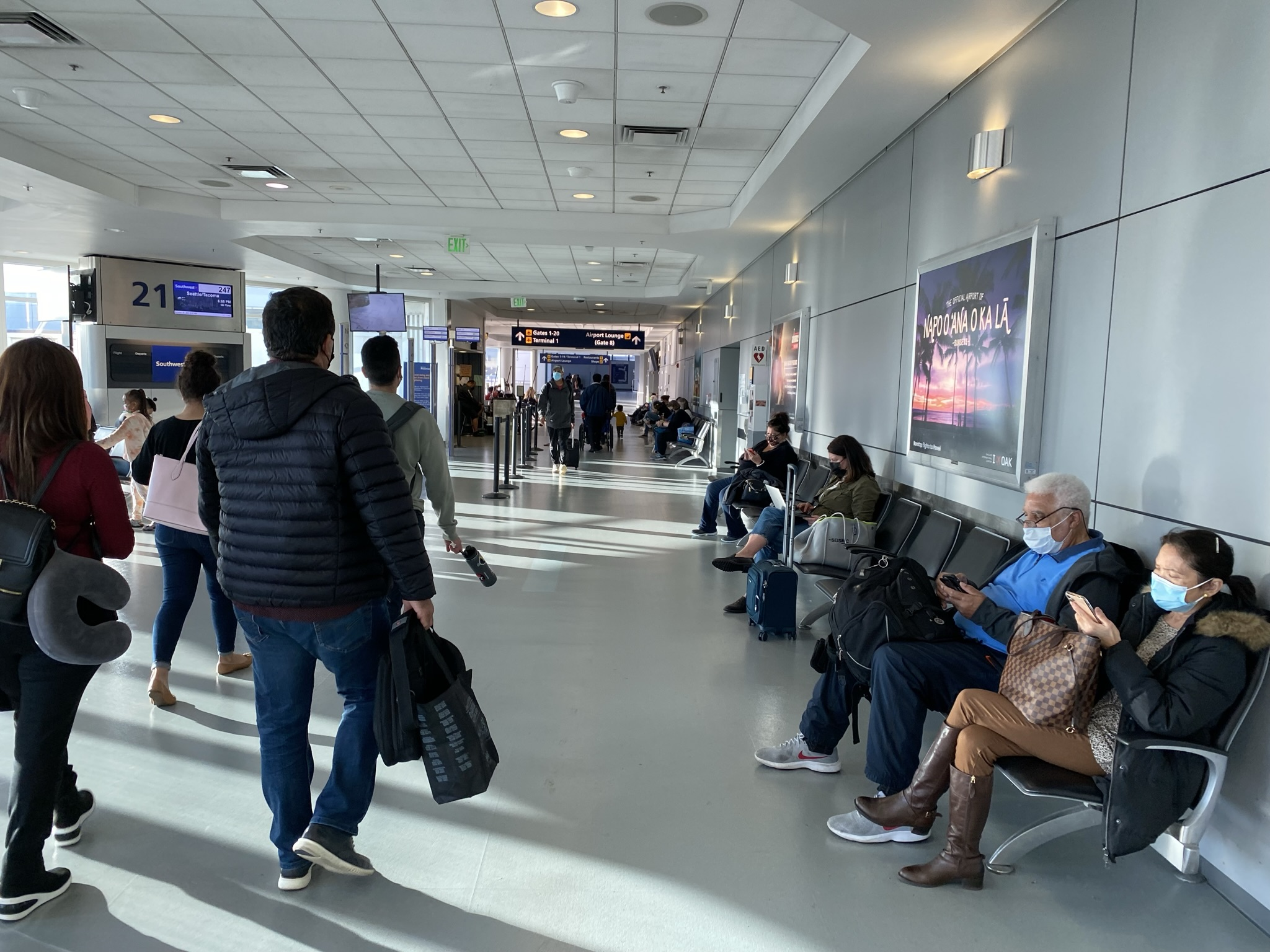
Terminal 2

=== Terminals ===
Oakland San Francisco Bay Airport has two terminals with a total of 29 gates. The terminals are connected at post-security and gate areas, enabling arriving passengers to go straight to their connecting flights without having to re-enter the security check. All non-pre-cleared international flights are processed in Terminal 1.

- Terminal 1 has 16 gates serving Advanced Air, Alaska, Delta, Frontier, Hawaiian, Southwest, Volaris, and Volaris El Salvador.
- Terminal 2 has 13 gates serving Southwest.

JSX is housed in a facility separate from the main passenger terminals.

=== Runways ===
Oakland San Francisco Bay Airport has four runways. Changes to Earth's magnetic field required runways 27 and 29 to be renamed 28 and 30 in 2013.

- South Field (commercial and cargo operations):
  - Runway 12/30: 10,520 ft × 150 ft (3,206 m × 46 m) asphalt
- North Field (general aviation operations):
  - Runway 10R/28L: 6,213 ft × 150 ft (1,894 m × 46 m) asphalt
  - Runway 10L/28R: 5,458 ft × 150 ft (1,664 m × 46 m) asphalt
  - Runway 15/33: 3,376 ft × 75 ft (1,029 m × 23 m) asphalt

Taxiway B connects the north and south runways; it passes over Ron Cowan Parkway, forming an aircraft bridge.

More than 95% of the time, winds in the area blow from the west or north, and aircraft arrive at Oakland from the southeast and depart to the northwest. On occasions when winds blow from the east or south, aircraft operate in the other direction, arriving from the northwest and departing to the southeast.

=== General aviation ===
Signature Flight Support is the primary fixed-base operator (FBO) at Oakland San Francisco Bay Airport. Before BBA Aviation acquired Landmark Aviation, the FBO at OAK was the first in the Bay Area and the twelfth location added to Landmark's network in 2011. The FBO is centrally located at OAK's North Field in the Hangar 5 facility. Landmark has initiated a multimillion-dollar renovation project, having already upgraded the FBO terminal along with beginning hangar and property improvements. KaiserAir also provides FBO services at Oakland's North Field, performing maintenance on Gulfstream, Hawker, Cessna and other business jet aircraft. KaiserAir operates Kona Shuttle with flights to Hawaii and charter business jets.

== Airlines and destinations ==
=== Passenger ===
The airport is served by the following airlines:

| Airlines | Destinations |
|---|---|
| Advanced Air | Crescent City |
| Alaska Airlines | Portland (OR), San Diego, Seattle/Tacoma |
| Delta Connection | Salt Lake City |
| Frontier Airlines | Las Vegas |
| Hawaiian Airlines | Honolulu, Kahului, Lihue |
| JSX | Las Vegas, Santa Monica |
| Southwest Airlines | Albuquerque, Austin, Boise, Burbank, Chicago–Midway, Dallas–Love, Denver, Honolulu, Houston–Hobby, Kahului, Las Vegas, Lihue, Long Beach, Los Angeles, Ontario, Orange County, Palm Springs, Phoenix–Sky Harbor, Portland (OR), Salt Lake City, San Diego, Santa Barbara, Seattle/Tacoma, Spokane |
| Volaris | Guadalajara, León/Del Bajío, Mexico City–Benito Juárez, Morelia |
| Volaris El Salvador | San Salvador |

=== Destinations map ===
Destinations map
Continental U.S. destinations from Oakland San Francisco Bay Airport
Red = Year-round destination
Green = Seasonal destination
Blue = Future destination
Pink = Destination being terminated
Hawaii destinations from Oakland San Francisco Bay Airport
Red = Year-round destination
Blue = Future destination
Mexico destinations from Oakland San Francisco Bay Airport
Red = Year-round destination
Blue = Future destination
Pink = Destination being terminated
Central America destinations
Central American and Caribbean destinations from Oakland San Francisco Bay Airport
Red = Year-round destination

=== Cargo ===
| Airlines | Destinations | Refs |
|---|---|---|
| FedEx Express | Anchorage, Auckland, Dallas/Fort Worth, Fresno, Guadalajara, Honolulu, Indianapolis, Las Vegas, Liège, Los Angeles, Memphis, Newark, Ontario, Osaka–Kansai, Phoenix–Sky Harbor, Portland (OR), Reno/Tahoe, Salt Lake City, San Diego, Seattle/Tacoma, Sydney, Tokyo–Narita; Seasonal: Allentown, Atlanta, Chicago–O'Hare | |
| UPS Airlines | Chicago–Rockford, Dallas/Fort Worth, Fresno, Louisville, Ontario, Philadelphia | |

== Statistics ==
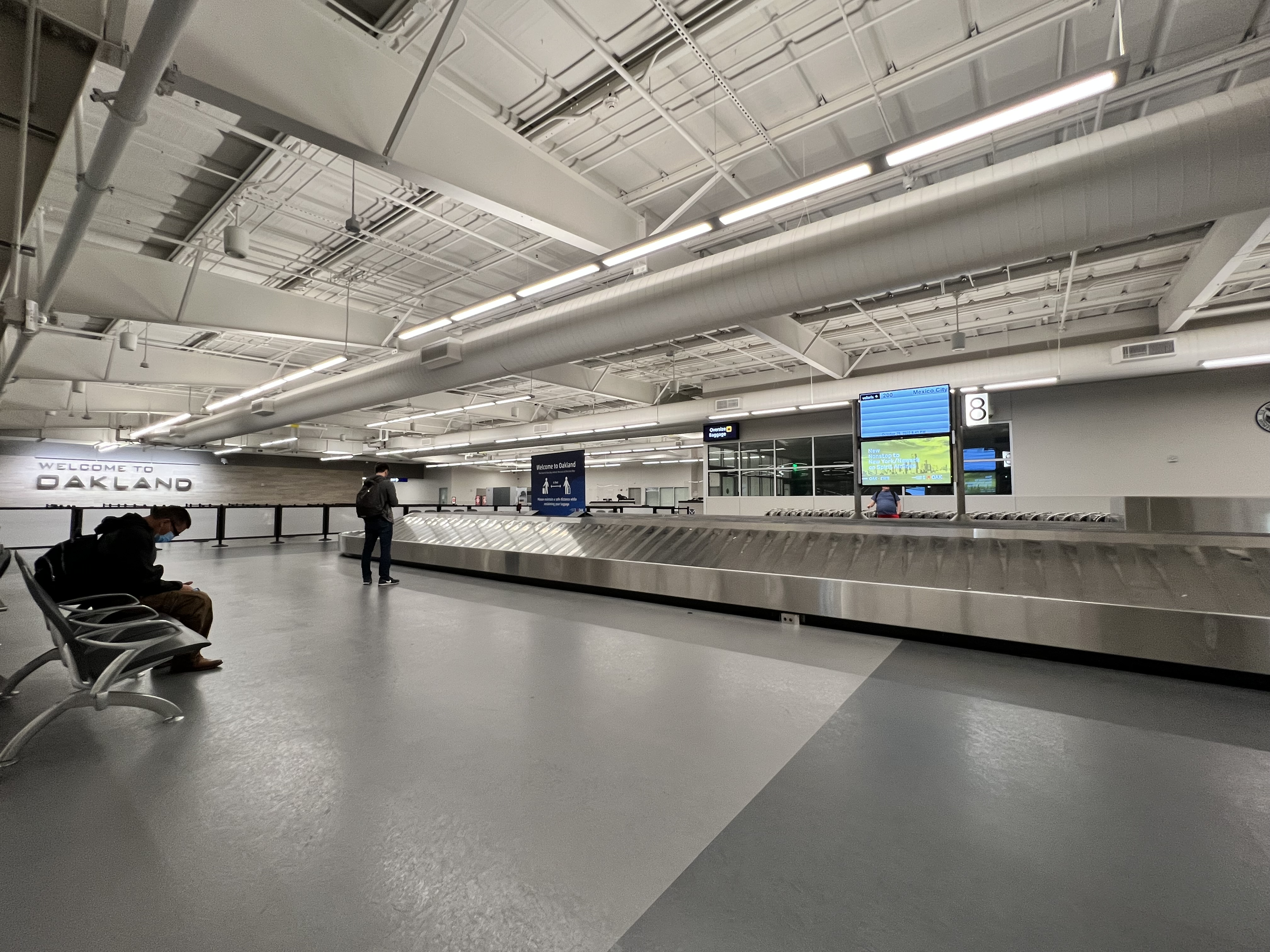
International arrivals baggage claim

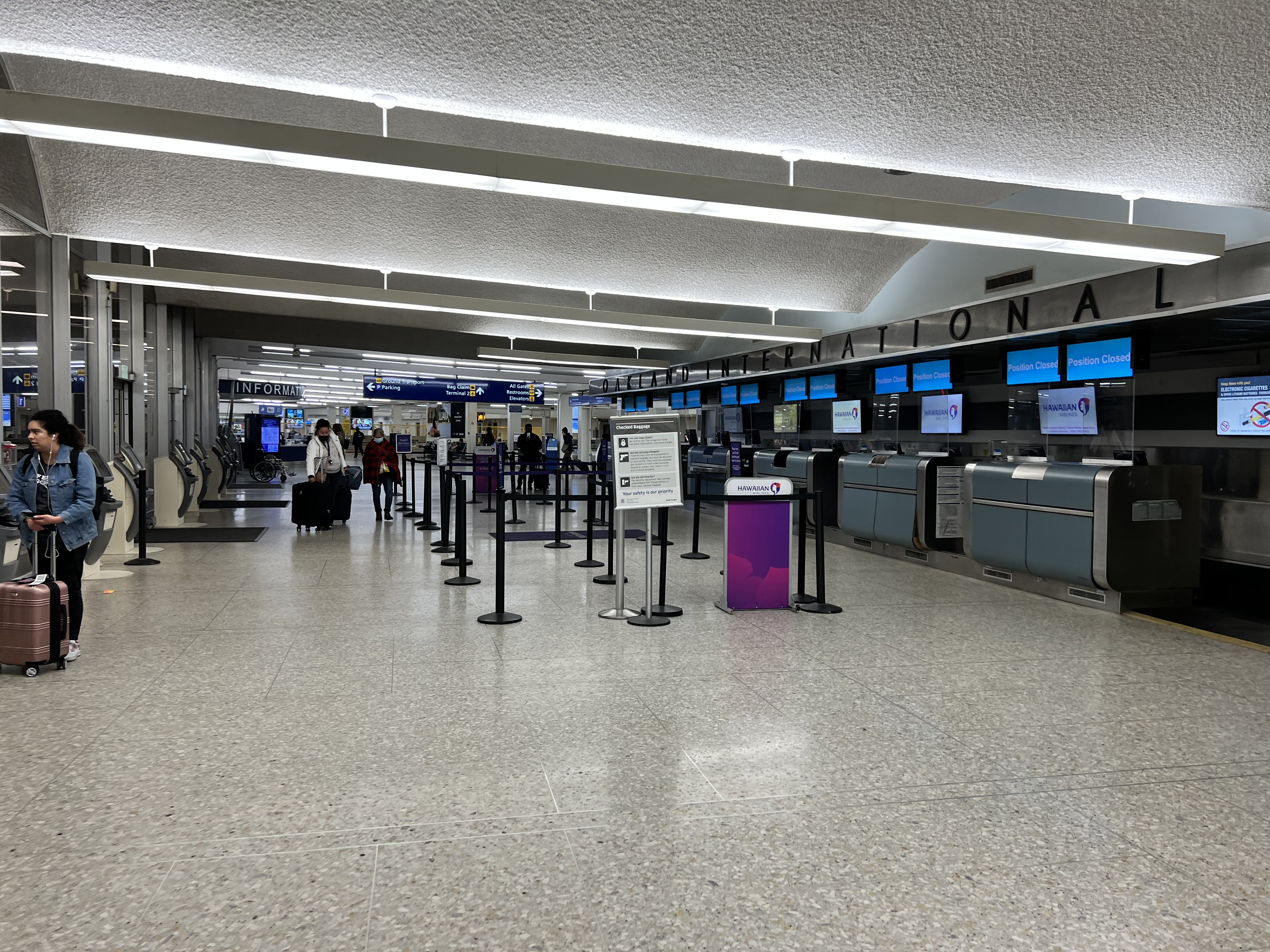
Check in counters at Terminal 1

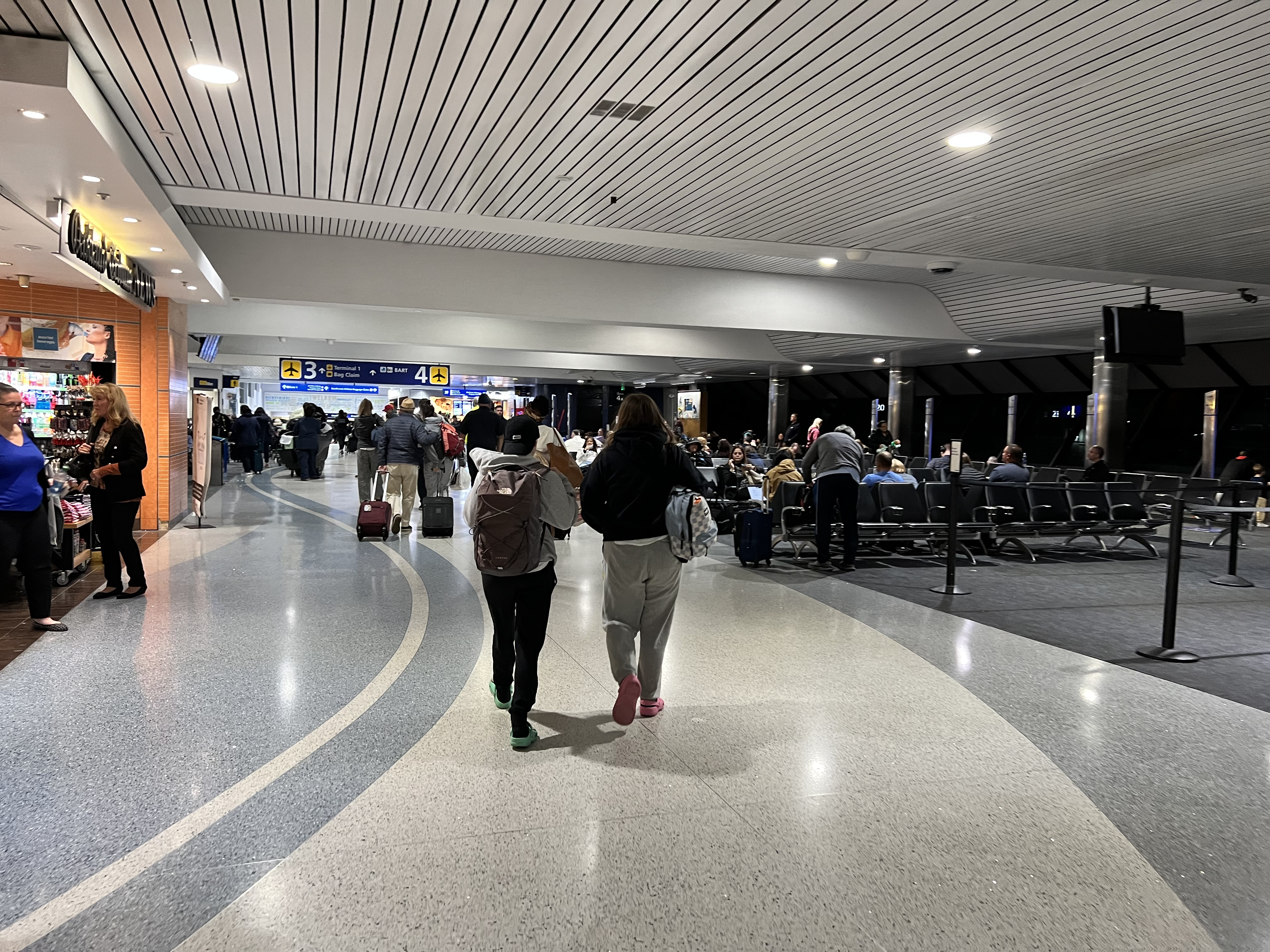
Terminal 1 at the airport

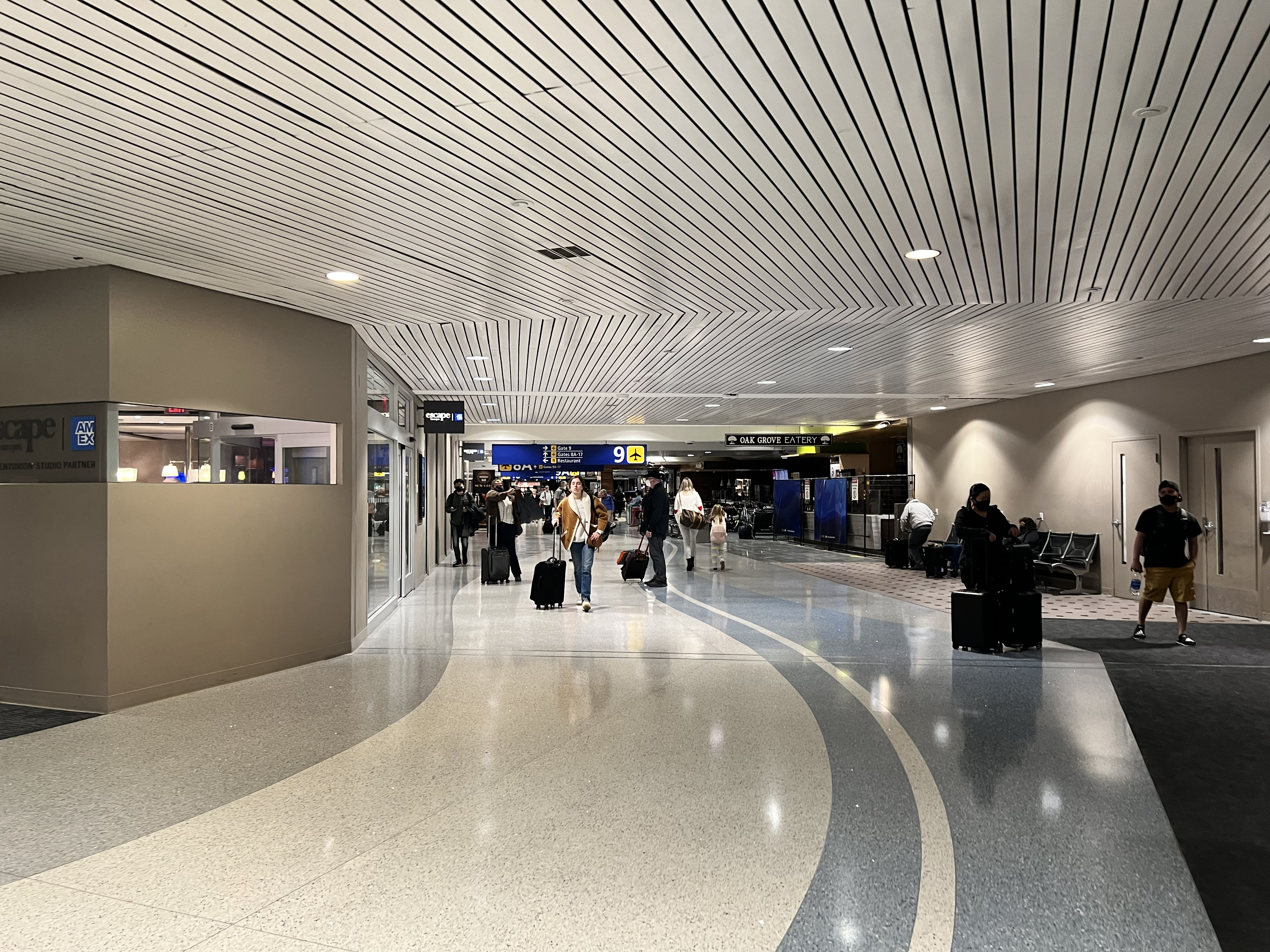
Terminal 1 at the airport

=== Annual traffic ===
Annual passenger traffic at OAK 2008–present
| Year | Passengers | % change | Year | Passengers | % change |
|---|---|---|---|---|---|
| 2008 | 11,474,456 | — | 2018 | 13,594,251 | ▲3.99% |
| 2009 | 9,505,281 | ▼ -17.16% | 2019 | 13,378,411 | ▼ -1.59% |
| 2010 | 9,542,333 | ▲0.39% | 2020 | 4,622,029 | ▼ -65.15% |
| 2011 | 9,266,570 | ▼ -2.89% | 2021 | 8,142,320 | ▲76.16% |
| 2012 | 10,040,864 | ▲8.36% | 2022 | 11,146,229 | ▲36.89% |
| 2013 | 9,742,887 | ▼ -2.97% | 2023 | 11,239,075 | ▲0.83% |
| 2014 | 10,336,788 | ▲6.10% | 2024 | 10,820,939 | ▼ -3.72% |
| 2015 | 11,205,063 | ▲8.40% | 2025 | 9,210,509 | ▼ -14.74% |
| 2016 | 12,070,967 | ▲7.73% | 2026 | | |
| 2017 | 13,072,245 | ▲8.29% | 2027 | | |

=== Top destinations ===
Busiest domestic routes from OAK (September 2025 – August 2026)
| Rank | City | Passengers | Carriers |
|---|---|---|---|
| 1 | Las Vegas, Nevada | 417,314 | JSX, Southwest, Spirit |
| 2 | San Diego, California | 372,681 | Southwest, Spirit |
| 3 | Seattle/Tacoma, Washington | 259,563 | Alaska, Southwest |
| 4 | Burbank, California | 258,740 | JSX, Southwest |
| 5 | Phoenix–Sky Harbor, Arizona | 246,588 | Southwest |
| 6 | Orange County, California | 232,844 | Southwest, Spirit |
| 7 | Denver, Colorado | 220,305 | Southwest |
| 8 | Los Angeles, California | 199,161 | Southwest |
| 9 | Portland, Oregon | 180,119 | Alaska, Southwest |
| 10 | Long Beach, California | 152,068 | Southwest |

Busiest international routes from OAK (September 2025 – August 2026)
| Rank | City | Passengers | Airlines |
|---|---|---|---|
| 1 | Guadalajara, Mexico | 343,491 | Viva, Volaris |
| 2 | Mexico City–Benito Juárez, Mexico | 132,138 | Volaris |
| 3 | Morelia, Mexico | 93,099 | Volaris |
| 4 | León/Del Bajío, Mexico | 78,363 | Volaris |
| 5 | San Salvador, El Salvador | 58,179 | Volaris El Salvador |
| 6 | San Jose Del Cabo, Mexico | 29,768 | Volaris, Southwest |
| 7 | Zacatecas, Mexico | 13,769 | Volaris |
| 8 | Monterrey, Mexico | 8,181 | Viva |

=== Airline market share ===
Largest airlines at OAK (September 2025 – August 2026)
| Rank | Airline | Passengers | Share |
|---|---|---|---|
| 1 | Southwest Airlines | 6,365,891 | 77.8% |
| 2 | Volaris | 642,462 | 7.9% |
| 3 | Alaska Airlines | 639,501 | 7.8% |
| 4 | Delta Air Lines | 133,076 | 1.6% |
| 5 | JSX (airline) | 109,774 | 1.3% |
| – | Other airlines | 293,400 | 3.6% |

== Ground transportation ==
=== Car ===
The airport is accessible by private automobile from Interstate 880 (Nimitz Freeway) which is 2 miles (3 km) away via Hegenberger Road or 98th Avenue heading west. Both roads converge into Airport Road before looping in front of the terminal entrances. Doolittle Drive (State Route 61) crosses both Hegenberger Road and 98th Avenue just to the east of where they converge into Airport Road, providing access to the nearby city of Alameda.

=== Public transportation ===
==== Train ====
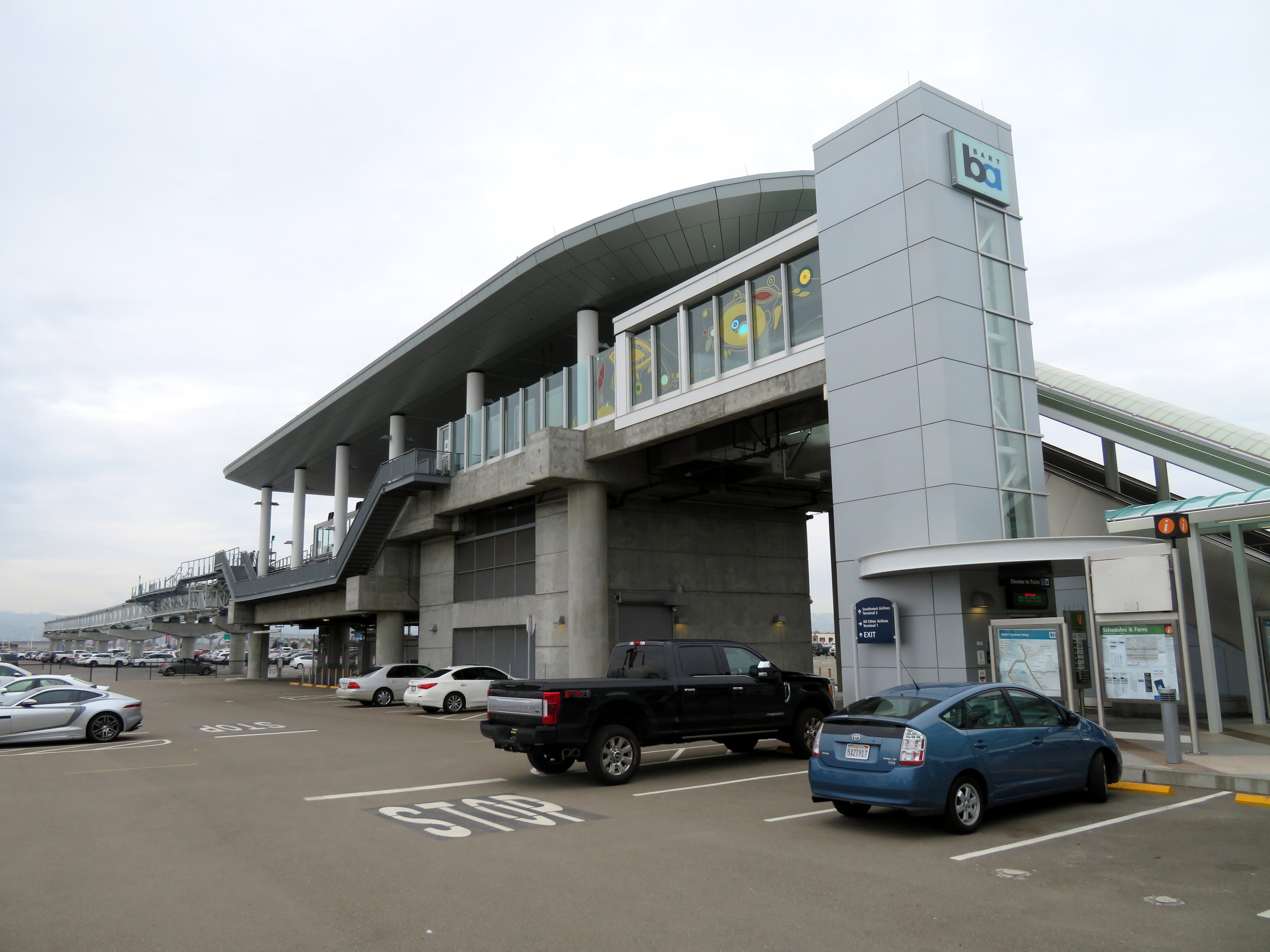
BART station at OAK

Bay Area Rapid Transit (BART) serves the airport at Oakland International Airport station via the Oakland Airport Connector, which is an automated guideway transit (AGT) line connecting the airport to nearby Coliseum station, served by mainline BART trains and Amtrak. The AGT vehicles depart the station every five minutes during daily peak hours and are designed to transport travelers to and from the airport in about eight minutes with an on-time performance of more than 99 percent. A fare surcharge is added for trips to or from Oakland San Francisco Bay Airport. The Oakland Airport Connector Project is largely attributable to the work of former BART director and port commissioner Carole Ward Allen who was responsible for securing local, state, and federal funding for the project. Ward Allen advocated for its approval before several transportation authorities endorsed the project, which created between 2,500 and 5,200 direct and indirect jobs. Some critics of the project argued that the money would be better spent on supporting existing local transit agencies, which had financial issues at the time.

==== Bus ====
Two AC Transit routes directly serve the airport: Line 73 runs from 5 AM to midnight; and Line 805 runs overnight as a part of the Bay Area's All Nighter bus network:

- Line 73 provides service from the airport to the Eastmont Transit Center via Hegenberger Road and 73rd Avenue, connecting with Amtrak's Capitol Corridor service and BART at Oakland Coliseum station. This route provides a cheaper alternative to BART's Oakland Airport Connector.
- Line 805 is an All Nighter service from the airport to the Uptown Transit Center in Downtown Oakland. Route 805 supplements Route 73 service to the Eastmont Transit Center before traveling north on MacArthur Boulevard and Grand Avenue to the Uptown Transit Center, making a limited connection with Amtrak's Capitol Corridor service at Oakland Coliseum station, and additional limited connections with BART at Oakland Coliseum station and 19th Street Oakland station.

Sonoma County Airport Express additionally provides airport bus service between the airport and Marin County, Sonoma County, and the Charles M. Schulz–Sonoma County Airport.

== Accidents and incidents ==
- April 27, 1943: A US Navy Douglas DC-3 crashed in the hills near the Lake Chabot Golf Course, about four miles east of Oakland during approach. Eight of the ten occupants were killed.
- January 18, 1944: A USAAF Douglas C-47 attempted to return to Oakland Municipal Airport because of the failure of the No. 1 engine. It stalled and crashed into a house. All eight occupants died.
- February 13, 1945: A US Navy Douglas DC-3 crashed into the Bay one mile from Naval Air Station Oakland 13 minutes after takeoff due to engine failure; all 24 occupants died.
- January 20, 1947: A US Navy Douglas DC-4 struck an embankment while on a radar-guided approach to Oakland Airport. A fire broke out. 20 of the 21 occupants got out safely, and one died.
- August 24, 1951: United Airlines Flight 615, a Douglas DC-6B impacted mountainous terrain 15 miles southeast of OAK during approach because of the failure of the captain to adhere to instrument procedures. All six crew and 44 passengers died.
- November 17, 1951: An Overseas National Airways (ONA) Douglas C-54, a training flight, collided with another C-54 at Oakland Range. The ONA aircraft crashed on a highway, and the other C-54 made an emergency landing at SFO. All three occupants died, and eleven people on the ground were injured.
- April 20, 1953: Western Airlines Flight 636, a Douglas DC-6B, crashed into the bay on approach to OAK after departing SFO. Eight of the ten occupants (four crew, and four passengers) were killed.
- February 5, 1959: A USAF Fairchild C-119 Flying Boxcar crashed and burned on a test flight, 1.5 miles south of OAK. All three occupants died.
- January 12, 1995: A West Air Cessna 208 Caravan, a cargo flight, impacted terrain four miles west of Pleasanton, California, 14 miles from OAK during the approach. The sole occupant, the pilot, was killed.

== See also ==
- List of airports in the San Francisco Bay Area
- List of airports in California
- California World War II Army Airfields
