= Aerovias Latino Americanas =

Salvadoran airline

- Commenced operations: 1947
- Ceased operations: 1947
- Operating bases: Ilopango International Airport
- Headquarters: San Salvador, El Salvador

Aerovias Latino Americanas, S.A. (Spanish for Latin American Airways, and also known as ALA or ALASA) was a Salvadoran airline which operated in 1947.

== Accidents and incidents ==
- On 30 April 1947, an ALASA Douglas C-47-DL (registered YS-30) was too low and collided with a train while attempting to land at the Ilopango International Airport in San Salvador. None of the four occupants of the aircraft were killed, but the aircraft was damaged beyond repair by the impact and fire.

== See also ==
- List of defunct airlines of El Salvador
