= Brown 1926 parasol monoplane =

General information
- Type: Parasol wing, two passenger light transport
- National origin: United States
- Designer: Lawrence W. Brown
- Number built: at least 2

History
- First flight: c.1924

The Brown 1926 parasol monoplane was a 1920s US, three seat, parasol wing civil aircraft developed from a biplane wartime scout. It was intended for either the private or commercial passenger markets, though one was used as a crop-duster.

== Design and development ==
Like several of Lawrence Brown's early designs, this parasol wing, Curtiss OX-5-engined version of the wartime Thomas-Morse S-4 biplane received no type name of its own. Both engine and airframe were available cheaply in the early post-war years.

Its wing had a similar area to those of the S-4 and was rectangular in plan. Its structure was largely spruce, with two box-beam spars and an airfoil of Brown's own design. The pilot's cockpit was under the trailing edge, which had a deep, curved cut-out to assist upward vision. The wing was attached to the fuselage by pairs of near-parallel steel struts, encased in wooden fairings overlain with fabric, between the spars and the lower longerons on each side.

Its fuselage was an internally wire braced, ash and spruce structure with a rectangular cross-section. The OX-5 engine, on a mounting intended to accommodate a variety of types, had its cylinders exposed and a ventilated metal cowling. Behind it, the passengers' cockpit was below the wing and between the spars. Behind the pilot's cockpit there was a curved upper decking that tapered to a tail which differed from that of the S-4, with a blunted triangular fin and rounded rectangular rudder. Its ground-adjustable tailplane was also rounded rectangular in plan, as were the elevators.

The monoplane had conventional, fixed landing gear. Its wheels were on a single axle, mounted on steel tube legs with rubber shock absorbers and trailing drag struts, both enclosed in wooden streamlining. Its tailskid was made from ash.

== Operational history ==
Although a modern source dates the Brown parasol to 1927, a contemporary account from March 1927 notes that two had been in service for three years, putting the first flight earlier than the spring of 1924.

One of these two was used in 1925 for cotton-dusting in El Salvador. The total number of biplane scout to parasol transport conversions is not known.

== Specifications ==
Data from Aero Digest, 1927 (Maker's data)

General characteristics

- Crew: one
- Capacity: two passengers
- Length: 23 ft (7.0 m)
- Wingspan: 40 ft 8 in (12.40 m)
- Height: 8 ft (2.4 m)
- Wing area: 260 sq ft (24 m^{2})
- Airfoil: Brown no.5
- Empty weight: 1,200 lb (544 kg)
- Fuel capacity: 30 US gal (25 imp gal; 110 L)
- Powerplant: 1 × Curtiss OX-5 V-8 water cooled piston engine, 90 hp (67 kW)
- Propellers: 2-bladed fixed-pitch propeller

Performance

- Maximum speed: 110 mph (180 km/h, 96 kn)
- Cruise speed: 100 mph (160 km/h, 87 kn) at 75% throttle
- Range: 400 mi (640 km, 350 nmi)
- Service ceiling: 16,000 ft (4,900 m)
- Time to altitude: 10 mins to 5,000 ft (1,500 m)
- Landing speed: 38 mph (61 km/h; 33 kn)
- Payload: 300 lb (140 kg)
