= Civil Aviation Authority (El Salvador) =

- Autoridad de Aviación Civil

Agency overview
- Formed: 1955
- Jurisdiction: El Salvador
- Headquarters: San Salvador, El Salvador
- Website: www.aac.gob.sv

The Civil Aviation Authority (Spanish: Autoridad de Aviación Civil, AAC) is the civil aviation agency of El Salvador. The agency conducts investigations into aviation accidents and incidents. The agency is headquartered in Ilopango Airport in Ilopango, San Salvador Department. Honduran authorities delegated the investigation of the TACA Flight 390 incident to the Salvadoran Civil Aviation Authority as per the Convention on International Civil Aviation.
