= Aerolíneas de El Salvador =

Salvadoran airline

IATA	ICAO	Call sign
SZ	SZA	AESA
- Founded: March 1960
- Ceased operations: 1991

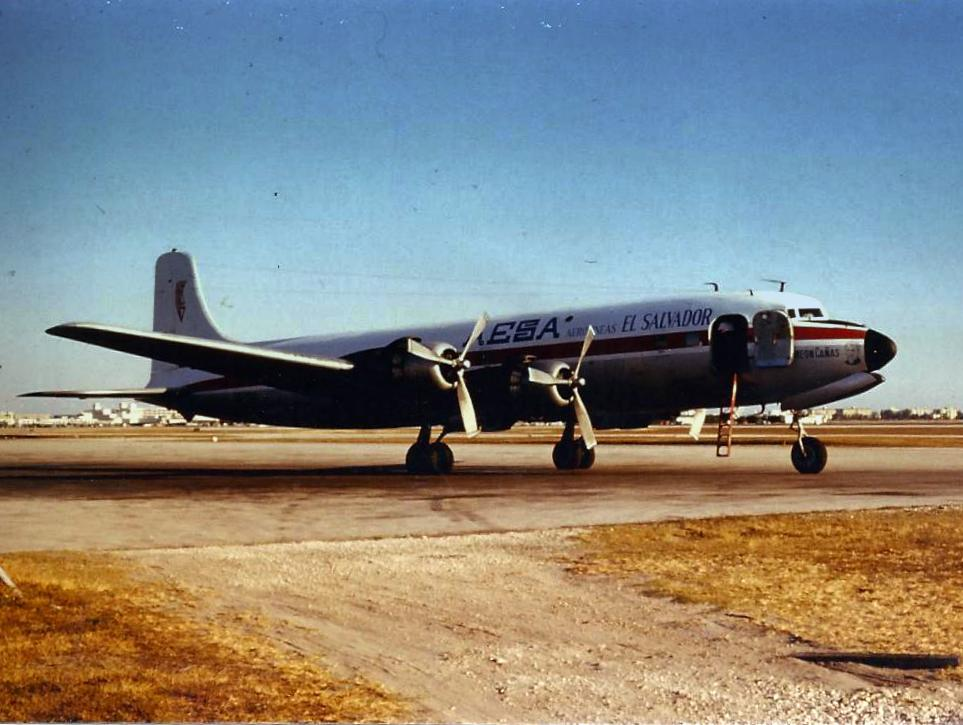
An AESA Douglas DC-6B at Miami International Airport in 1985

AESA - Aerolíneas de El Salvador S.A. was a Salvadoran airline owned by the Government of El Salvador (55%) and LANICA (45%), operating weekly cargo and mail flights between San Salvador and Miami. In 1991, the airline was merged into TACA Airlines.

== Accidents and incidents ==
- On February 13, 1965, a Curtiss C-46 Commando (registered YS-012C) suffered a failure on the left engine, shortly after taking off from Miami International Airport. The aircraft stalled and crashed near the end of the runway, killing both pilots.
- On June 29, 1988, a Douglas DC-6B (registered YS-05C) had a stall and crashed shortly after taking off from El Salvador International Airport. The aircraft was destroyed, while both pilots were injured.

== See also ==
- List of defunct airlines of El Salvador
