= Volaris El Salvador =

Low-cost airline in El Salvador

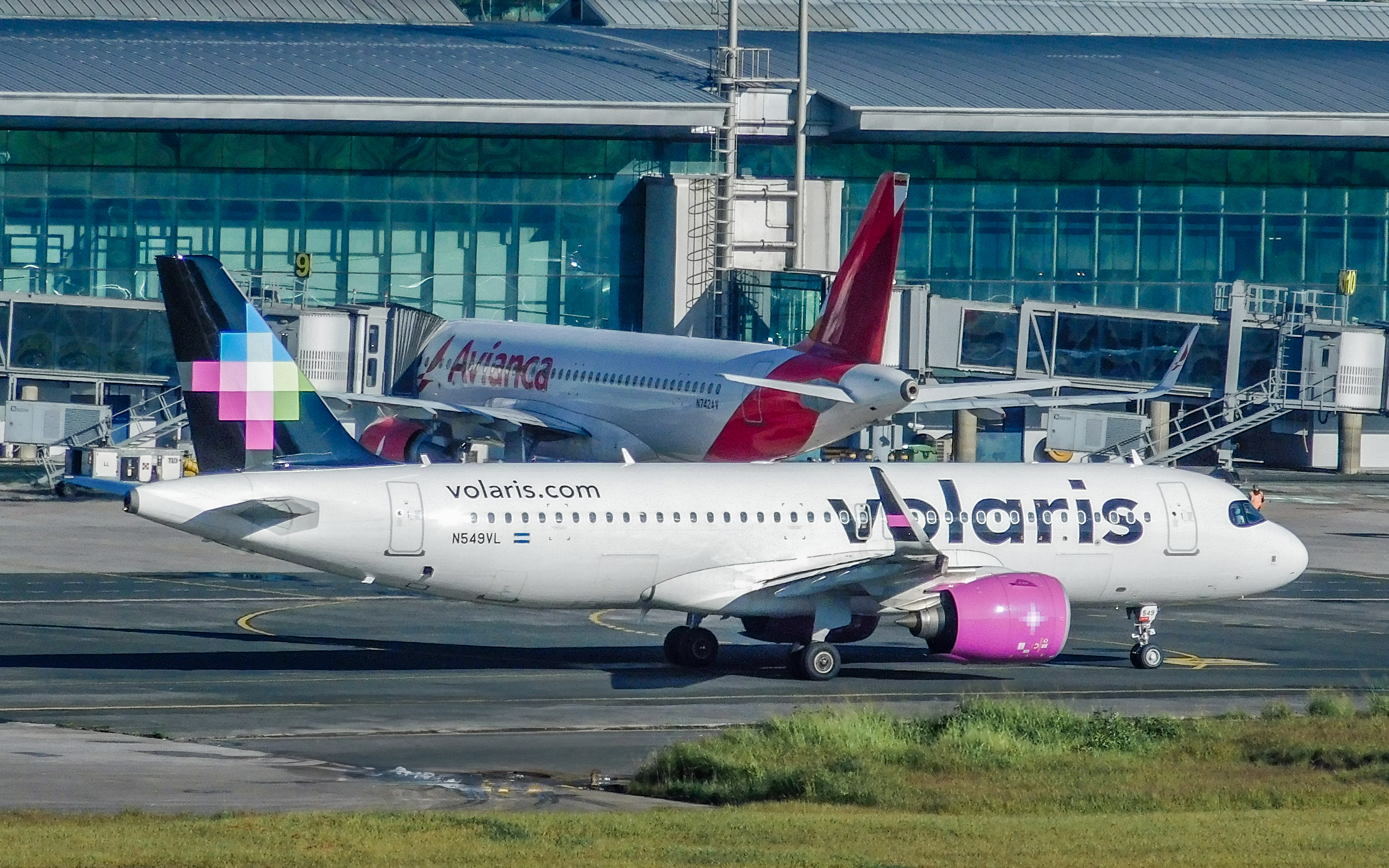
IATA	ICAO	Call sign
N3	VOS	JETSAL
- Founded: 2019; 7 years ago
- Commenced operations: September 2019; 7 years ago
- Operating bases: El Salvador International Airport
- Frequent-flyer program: v.club
- Fleet size: 6
- Destinations: 13
- Parent company: Volaris
- Headquarters: San Salvador, El Salvador
- Key people: Jose Antonio Martinez (Operations Manager); Mauricio Moran Alfaro (CEO)
- Website: www.volaris.com

Vuela El Salvador S.A. de C.V., operating as Volaris El Salvador, is a low-cost airline based in San Salvador. It is a subsidiary of the Mexican Volaris and a local flag carrier for El Salvador.

== History ==
The airline had its first certification flight on August 20, 2019, between the cities of San Salvador, Guatemala City and Guadalajara.

== Destinations ==
Country	City	Airport	Notes	Refs
El Salvador	San Salvador	El Salvador International Airport	Base	
Guatemala	Guatemala City	La Aurora International Airport		
Honduras	San Pedro Sula	Ramón Villeda Morales International Airport		
Honduras	Roatan	Juan Manuel Gálvez International Airport	Terminated	
Mexico	Cancún	Cancún International Airport		
Mexico	Mexico City	Mexico City International Airport		
United States	Chicago	O'Hare International Airport		
United States	Houston	George Bush Intercontinental Airport		
United States	Los Angeles	Los Angeles International Airport		
United States	Oakland	Oakland San Francisco Bay Airport		
United States	Miami	Miami International Airport		
United States	New York City	John F. Kennedy International Airport	Terminated	
United States	Ontario	Ontario International Airport		
United States	Washington, D. C.	Dulles International Airport		
United States	Newark	Newark Liberty International Airport		

== Fleet ==
=== Current fleet ===
As of July 2026, Volaris El Salvador operates the following aircraft:

Volaris El Salvador fleet
Aircraft	In service	Orders	Passengers	Notes
Airbus A320neo	6		186	
Total	6		—	

=== Former fleet ===
As of September 2025, Volaris El Salvador operated 3 Airbus A320neo.

== See also ==
- List of airlines of El Salvador
- List of low-cost airlines
