= Veca Airlines =

Salvadoran airline

VECA Airlines Vuelos Economicos de Centro America
IATA	ICAO	Call sign
VU	VAR	VECA
- Founded: March 28, 2014
- Ceased operations: January 18, 2017
- Hubs: Monseñor Óscar Arnulfo Romero International Airport
- Focus cities: Juan Santamaría International Airport
- Fleet size: 2
- Destinations: 4
- Headquarters: San Salvador, El Salvador
- Key people: Armando De Lucas Hurtado Acera, CEO
- Website: www.vecaairlines.com

VECA Airlines (Vuelos Economicos de Centro America) was a Salvadoran airline owned by Sociedad Hasgar S.A. de C.V. It was established in early 2014 in San Salvador with a main hub at Monseñor Óscar Arnulfo Romero International Airport. By the end of 2014, ALBA Petróleos de El Salvador had bought all outstanding shares of its holding company. As of January 18, 2017 VECA airlines suspended operations due to financial problems.

== History ==
The airline started operations on 28 November 2014 with regional services to major cities in Central America (San José, Managua and Guatemala City). VECA started its services with two Airbus A319s.

== Destinations ==
VECA Airlines' main hub was in San Salvador at Monseñor Óscar Arnulfo Romero International Airport. For initial operations in November 2014, VECA operated to the following cities:

City	Country	Airport
San José	Costa Rica	Juan Santamaría International Airport
San Salvador	El Salvador	Monseñor Óscar Arnulfo Romero International Airport (HUB)
Guatemala City	Guatemala	La Aurora International Airport
Managua	Nicaragua	Augusto C. Sandino International Airport

== Fleet ==
Veca Airlines was operating the following aircraft at the time it suspended operations:

Veca Airlines fleet
Aircraft	In service	Orders	Passengers	Notes
Airbus A319-100	1	—	?	—
Total	1	0		
