= El Salvador International Airport =

Salvadoran largest airport serving San Salvador located in San Luis Talpa, La Paz

El Salvador International Airport Aeropuerto Internacional de El Salvador
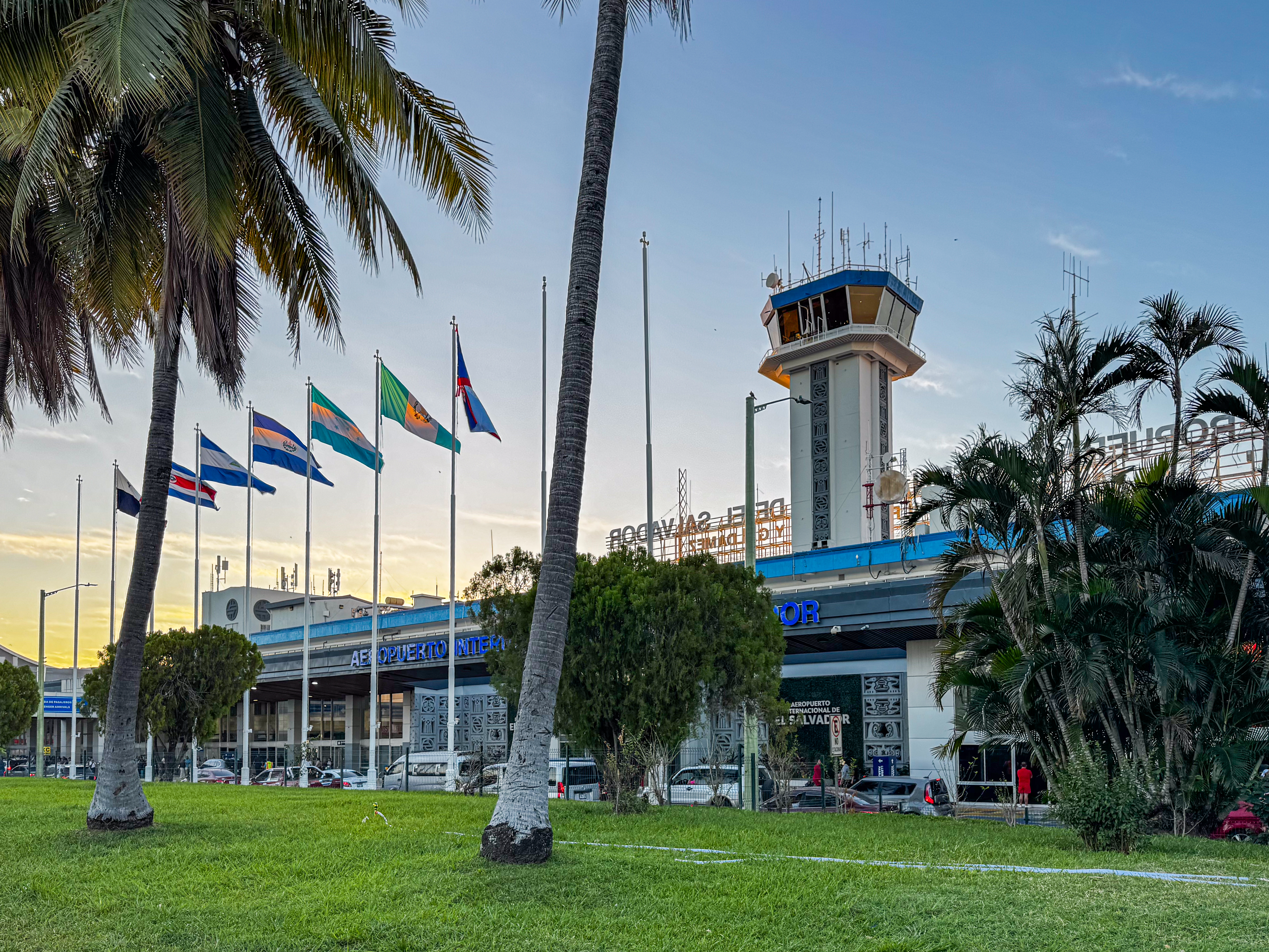
- The airport terminal in 2026
- IATA: SAL; ICAO: MSLP; WMO: 78666

Summary
- Airport type: Military/Public
- Operator: Autonomous Port Executive Commission (CEPA)
- Serves: San Salvador, El Salvador
- Location: San Luis Talpa
- Opened: 31 January 1980; 46 years ago
- Hub for: Avianca El Salvador; Volaris El Salvador
- Time zone: CST (UTC−06:00)
- Elevation AMSL: 31 m (102 ft)
- Coordinates: 13°26′27″N 89°03′20″W
- Website: Official website

Map
- Location in El Salvador

Runways
Direction	Length		Surface
Direction	m	ft	Surface
07/25	3,200	10,499	Asphalt
~~18/36~~ (Closed)	~~800~~	~~2,625~~	~~Asphalt~~

Statistics (2024)
- Total passengers: 5,298,491
- Aircraft operations: 49,066
- Sources: AIP at COCESNA and DAFIF; Passengers and aircraft from airport website

El Salvador International Airport Saint Óscar Arnulfo Romero y Galdámez (Spanish: Aeropuerto Internacional de El Salvador San Óscar Arnulfo Romero y Galdámez), (IATA: SAL, ICAO: MSLP), previously known as Comalapa International Airport (Aeropuerto Internacional de Comalapa) and as Comalapa Air Base (Base Aérea de Comalapa) to the military, is a joint-use civilian and military airport that serves San Salvador, El Salvador. It is located in the south central area of the country, in the city of San Luis Talpa, Department of La Paz, and occupies a triangle of 2,519.8 acres (1,019.7 ha), bordered by the Pacific Ocean on the south and the Jiboa River on the east, with the coastal highway to the northwest. It is close to sea level allowing aircraft to operate efficiently at maximum capacity. It is connected to the capital of San Salvador, El Salvador, by a four-lane motorway, with 42 kilometres (26 mi) travel in an average time of 30 minutes.

It is third in Central America in movement of passengers with 3,411,015 annually, counted without methodology, suggested by International Civil Aviation Organization (ICAO). It is classified as category 1 by the Federal Aviation Administration of the United States (FAA) and is certified by the Civil Aviation Authority (AAC), the first airport on the isthmus to achieve these certifications. In the Skytrax World Airport Awards 2015, it was recognized as the third best airport in Central America and the Caribbean. According to the World Economic Forum, it has the second most competitive infrastructure in the region, achieving a score of 4.8 out of 7. In addition, ICAO recognizes it as having one of the best security standards on the continent, only exceeded by airports in the United States and Canada.

== History ==
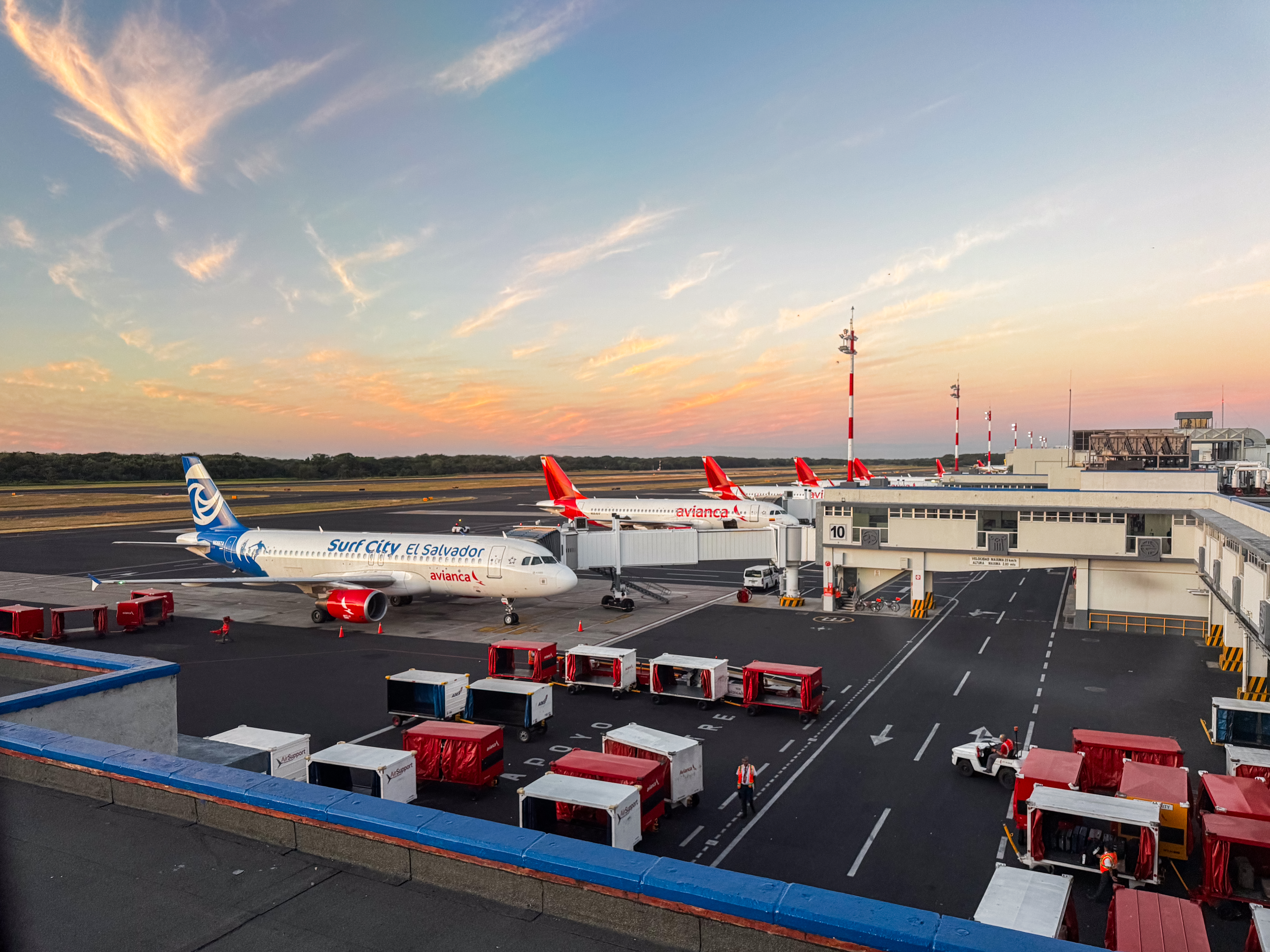
Airport apron

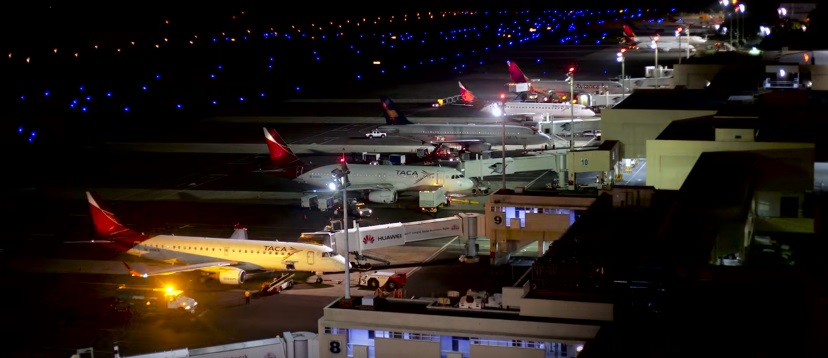
El Salvador International Airport at night

The airport was built in the late 1970s to replace its predecessor, Ilopango International Airport, which is now used for regional, air taxi, military, and charter aviation. The airport was built on the initiative and request of then-President Colonel Arturo Armando Molina. Funding for this project was provided through the Government of Japan, Engineering and building came under the direction of Hazama Ando (then Hazama Gumi). The electrical work for all lighting and communications was completed by Toshiba (then Tokyo Shibaura Electric). The airport entered in operation on 31 January 1980 as Cuscatlán International Airport (Spanish: Aeropuerto Internacional Cuscatlán), with its first flight being a TACA airliner bound for Guatemala City.

In 1995, the Salvadoran company B&B Arquitectos Asociados designed the expansion of waiting rooms and boarding bridges, of which only the area located to the west was built. The airport is the only connection center in Central America, or hub, for the airline Avianca, and also serves other airlines that fly to almost 30 destinations between Central America, North America, South America and Europe. Since 1998 when the first expansion of the airport occurred (AIES II), the airport has been suffering from saturation in areas of check-in, screening, immigration and baggage as it continues to serve more than 2 million passengers arriving each year. In late 2012, the Autonomous Port Executive Commission (CEPA) began their rehabilitation, modernization and optimization project for the airport, which was completed in April 2015.

On 16 January 2014, President Mauricio Funes announced that the airport would be renamed after Monsignor Óscar Arnulfo Romero y Galdámez, but it is still commonly known as El Salvador International Airport (Spanish: Aeropuerto Internacional de El Salvador). The Legislature of El Salvador approved the name change on 19 March 2014, without the vote of the Nationalist Republican Alliance (ARENA) or the National Coalition Party (PCN), to Monseñor Óscar Arnulfo Romero y Galdámez International Airport. On 24 March 2014, Funes unveiled a ceremonial plaque to mark the official renaming. The airport was renamed to Saint Óscar Arnulfo Romero y Galdámez International Airport on 29 October 2018 by the Commission of Culture and Education after Romero was canonized as a saint by the Catholic Church on 14 October of the same year.

== Airport infrastructure ==
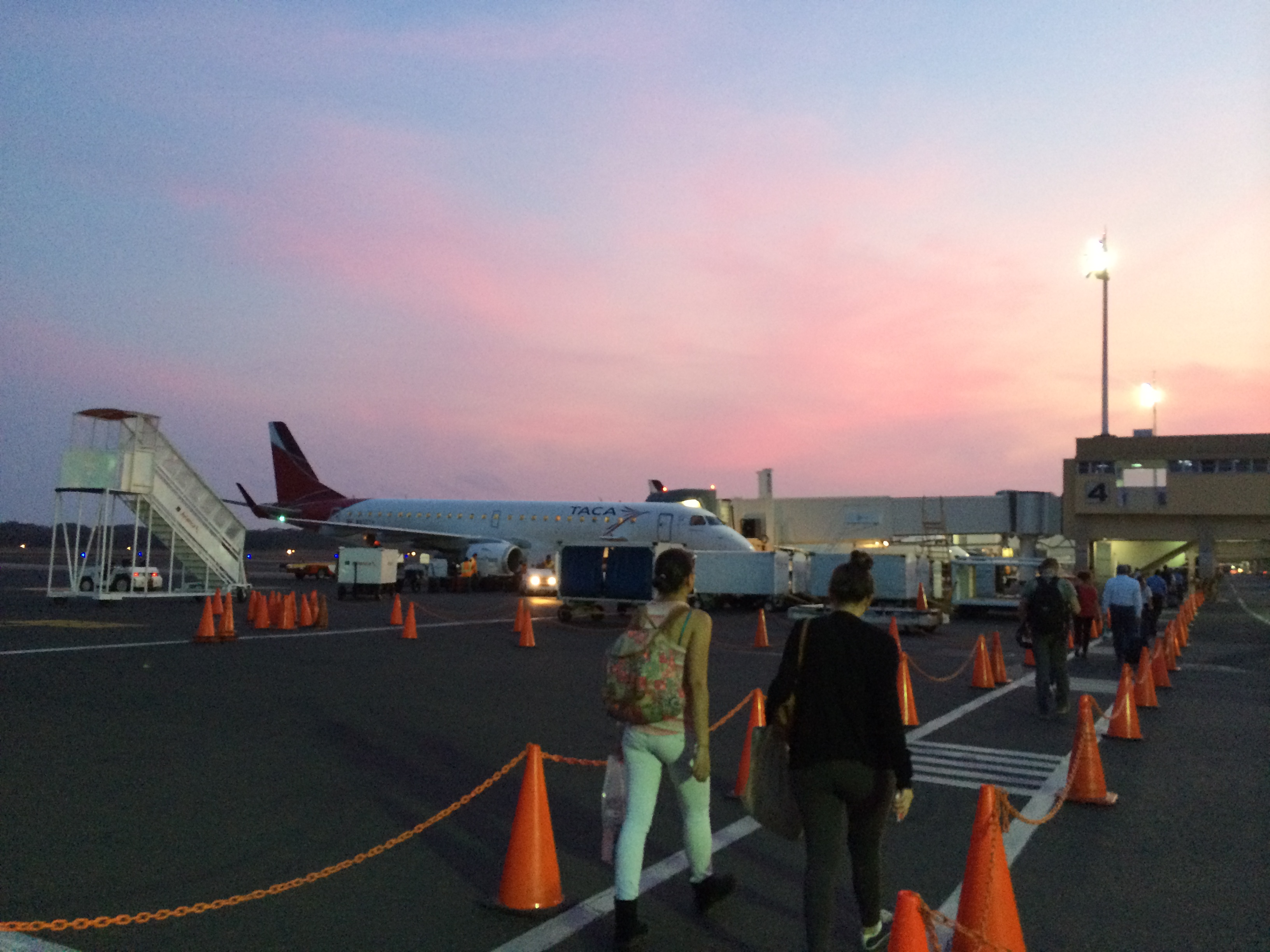
Gate 4 at El Salvador International Airport.

Saint Óscar Arnulfo Romero y Galdámez International Airport serves as the main hub for TACA Airlines, now Avianca El Salvador, and Volaris El Salvador. The cargo terminal, located a few dozen meters west of the passenger terminal, handles millions of tons of cargo each year. The airport is located about 50 km (31 mi) by road from the city of San Salvador. It handles international flights to Central America, North America, South America and Europe including flights to Spain.

When the airport was built, it originally had only 7 gates. It was designed to handle around 400,000 passengers a year, but the high increase of passengers in the last 15 years brought the airport to its maximum capacity. The airport has had two main expansions in the last decade or so. In its first phase (named AIES I), the airport grew from 7 boarding gates to 12, and later the second phase, AIES II, added 5 more gates bringing the total to 17. Along with new gates, new expanded passenger waiting areas were built. Even though all these expansions have been made, the airport once again has reached the peak of its capacity, handling over 2 million passengers in 2006. In February 2022, a brand new terminal building was inaugurated with five gates and the first gate with double boarding jetways in the airport. The new terminal building segregates arriving passengers, connecting, and departing passengers.

The airport has a main runway (07/25) 3,200 m × 45 m (10,499 ft × 148 ft), with an effective running surface of 45 m (148 ft) and 7.5 m (25 ft) shoulders. Parallel to the main track and the same length as this, is the taxiway Alpha, which is connected to the track through six starts. For the use of small aircraft, there is also a secondary runway (18/36), 800 m × 23 m (2,625 ft × 75 ft), which is currently used for parking of "long life" for aircraft that require it.

The platform of Passenger Terminal 1 Building has fourteen aircraft parking positions with respective boarding bridges, which connect the aircraft directly to the waiting rooms. The platform of Passenger Terminal 2 Building has five aircraft parking positions with their respective boarding bridges. One of the positions has double boarding bridges for widebody aircraft. Three remaining positions are "remote", i.e., passengers who disembark at any of them are transferred to the terminal through aerobuses. The remote gates are used mostly by turboprop aircraft. The runway is capable of handling landings and takeoffs by Boeing 747 and Boeing 777 aircraft. Taiwan's President Tsai Ing-wen made an official diplomatic tour of Central America in an Eva Air B777-300ER aircraft.

The platform of the Cargo Terminal Building (ETC) has three positions for cargo aircraft parking, and also has a platform for the maintenance of five aircraft if required, just in front of hangars Aeromantenimiento (AEROMAN), a modern repairs workshop. The ETC has a total built area, comprising warehouses and offices, of 10,286 m^{2} (110,720 sq ft).

== Facilities ==
The airport's modern facilities include duty-free shops, fast food and full-service restaurants, bars, air conditioned areas, tourist facilities, car rental, and spacious waiting rooms. There is space for 14 airplanes in terminal 1, 5 airplanes in terminal 2, 3 in the cargo terminal, 37 in Aeromantenimiento, S.A., and around 20 in the "Long Term Parking" which is runway 18/36. 94.5% of the airport's flights are on time (2005 data). The airport and runway have been closed at least 10 times in the almost quarter century since opening. They were closed for several hours following the devastating earthquake of 2001, followed up with minor repairs to the east end of the runway. They were closed again for several hours in 2005 due to Hurricane Stan. Although the airport is located near the Pacific Ocean, storms and hurricanes are not frequent.

There is Wi-Fi availability throughout much of the airport via Tigo El Salvador. Near Gate 3, a café called "The Coffee Cup" has free Wi-Fi for all customers.

== Security ==
The International Airport of El Salvador, located in the town of San Luis Talpa, La Paz, received an international certification from the Civil Aviation Authority (CAA), after an investment of $8 million and a process of four years and two extensions.

The document credits the Salvadoran airport terminal with compliance with all safety regulations issued under the Civil Aviation Organisation (ICAO), on fire control and health care, removal of rubber from the runways, lights and safety signs.

The certification enables El Salvador to keep the category 1 status from the Federal Aviation Administration of the United States. "From the start of operations of the airport in January 1980, the terminal has been characterized by its safety," said Ricardo Sauerbrey, head of the Salvadoran terminal.

== Airlines and destinations ==
=== Passengers ===
Airlines	Destinations
Aeroméxico	Mexico City–Benito Juárez
Air Europa	Madrid (begins 17 December 2026)
Air Transat	Seasonal: Montréal–Trudeau
American Airlines	Dallas/Fort Worth, Miami
Avianca	Bogotá
Avianca Costa Rica	San José (CR)
Avianca El Salvador	Bogotá, Boston, Cancún, Dallas/Fort Worth, Guatemala City, Guayaquil, Houston–Intercontinental, Lima, Los Angeles, Managua, Medellín–JMC, Mexico City–Benito Juárez, Madrid, Miami, New York–JFK, Ontario (CA), Panama City–Tocumen, Quito, San Francisco, San José (CR), San Pedro Sula, Tegucigalpa/Comayagua, Toronto–Pearson, Washington–Dulles; Seasonal: Chicago–O'Hare, Las Vegas, Montréal–Trudeau
Avianca Guatemala	Guatemala City
Copa Airlines	Panama City–Tocumen
Delta Air Lines	Atlanta
Frontier Airlines	Atlanta, Houston–Intercontinental; Seasonal: Dallas/Fort Worth, Miami, Orlando, Washington–Dulles
Iberia	Madrid
Iberojet	Barcelona, Madrid
TAG Airlines	Guatemala City, Roatán
United Airlines	Houston–Intercontinental, Los Angeles, Newark; Seasonal: Washington–Dulles
Volaris El Salvador	Houston–Intercontinental, Los Angeles, Mexico City–Benito Juárez, Newark, Oakland, San Pedro Sula, Washington–Dulles

=== Cargo ===
Airlines	Destinations
Amerijet International	Miami
Avianca Cargo	Miami
DHL Aero Expreso	Guatemala City, Panama City–Tocumen
FedEx Feeder operated by IFL Group	Guatemala City, Miami
LATAM Cargo	Miami, Quito

== Statistics ==
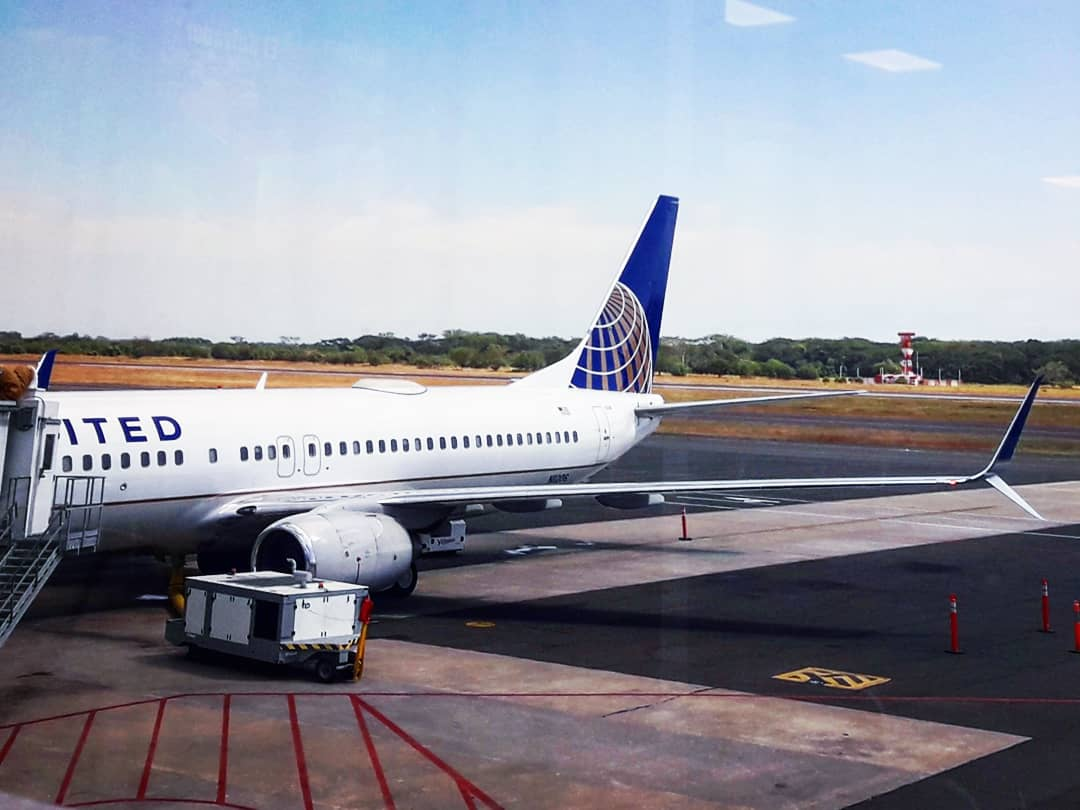
Boeing 737-800 of United Airlines at gate 10 of Saint Óscar Arnulfo Romero y Galdámez International Airport, in 2018. It then was the second largest airline serving the airport, behind Avianca El Salvador.

=== Busiest routes ===
Busiest international routes from El Salvador International Airport (2023)
Rank	City	Passengers	Airlines
1	Los Angeles, California	492,482	Avianca Costa Rica, Avianca El Salvador, United Airlines, Volaris Costa Rica, Volaris El Salvador
2	Houston–Intercontinental, Texas	488,904	Avianca El Salvador, Spirit Airlines, United Airlines, Volaris El Salvador
3	Washington–Dulles, D.C.	472,011	Avianca El Salvador, United Airlines, Volaris Costa Rica, Volaris El Salvador
4	New York–JFK, New York	254,256	Avianca El Salvador, Volaris El Salvador
5	Miami, Florida	236,352	Avianca El Salvador, American Airlines
6	San José, Costa Rica	190,531	Avianca El Salvador, Avianca Costa Rica, Volaris El Salvador, Volaris Costa Rica
7	Dallas/Fort Worth, Texas	177,141	American Airlines, Avianca El Salvador
8	Mexico City, México	173,582	Aeroméxico Connect, Avianca El Salvador, Volaris El Salvador
9	Panama City–Tocumen, Panama	170,643	Avianca El Salvador, Copa Airlines
10	Atlanta, Georgia	127,878	Delta Air Lines, Frontier Airlines

=== Airline market share ===
Top Airlines at SAL (January 2023 – December 2023)
Rank	Airline	Passengers	Percent of market share
1	Avianca El Salvador	1,314,048	35.6%
2	Volaris El Salvador	594,460	16.1%
3	United Airlines	446,067	12.1%
4	American Airlines	307,768	8.3%
5	Avianca Costa Rica	194,032	5.3%

== Accidents and incidents ==
Saint Óscar Arnulfo Romero y Galdámez International Airport has not had any fatalities or accidents, however, there have been two emergency landings from aircraft passing near the airport.

- On 29 June 1988, an El Salvador Airlines Douglas DC-6BF (registered YS-05C) crashed during its initial climb out of the airport. Both occupants survived, but the aircraft was written off.
- On 24 April 1995, a TACA Airlines Cessna Citation I (registered N120ES) undershot the runway on approach, colliding with trees 2,500 feet short of the runway. Both crew members survived.
- In 2001, El Salvador experienced an earthquake (7.6 on the Richter scale). El Salvador International Airport closed for several hours due to airport damage: all damage was successfully repaired.
- On 27 April 2002, a Centurion Air Cargo McDonnell Douglas DC-10-40F (registered N141WE) lost the No. 1 and 2 hydraulic pressure systems after two of its tires exploded upon coming into contact with a reverser cascade from a Boeing 727 which was present on the runway. The aircraft made an emergency landing at the airport.
- In November 2013, a Copa Airlines flight from Los Angeles with a destination of Panama City, Panama, had to perform an emergency landing at El Salvador International Airport due to technical problems.
- On 29 December 2013, flights to/from Honduras and Nicaragua were suspended due to the eruption of the Chaparrastique Volcano (San Miguel Volcano), which caused an ash plume that had a 10 kilometers height. Flights to and from Honduras and Nicaragua resumed when it was safe to fly by and the Yellow and Orange Alerts were gone; by 5 January 2014 all flights were resumed.
- On 7 May 2023, a Cessna A-37 Dragonfly of the Salvadoran Air Force caught on fire while attempting an emergency landing at El Salvador International Airport. The aircraft, which participated in celebrations for the country's Soldier's Day, was originally meant to land at the Ilopango International Airport but landed in Comalapa after the pilot discovered a technical problem. No one was injured during the emergency landing and flights were temporarily delayed.
- On 20 October 2023, a Honduran man died on board an Avianca flight from New York which landed at El Salvador International Airport.

== See also ==
- Transport in El Salvador
- List of airports in El Salvador
