= El Chal =

Pre-Columbian Maya archaeological site

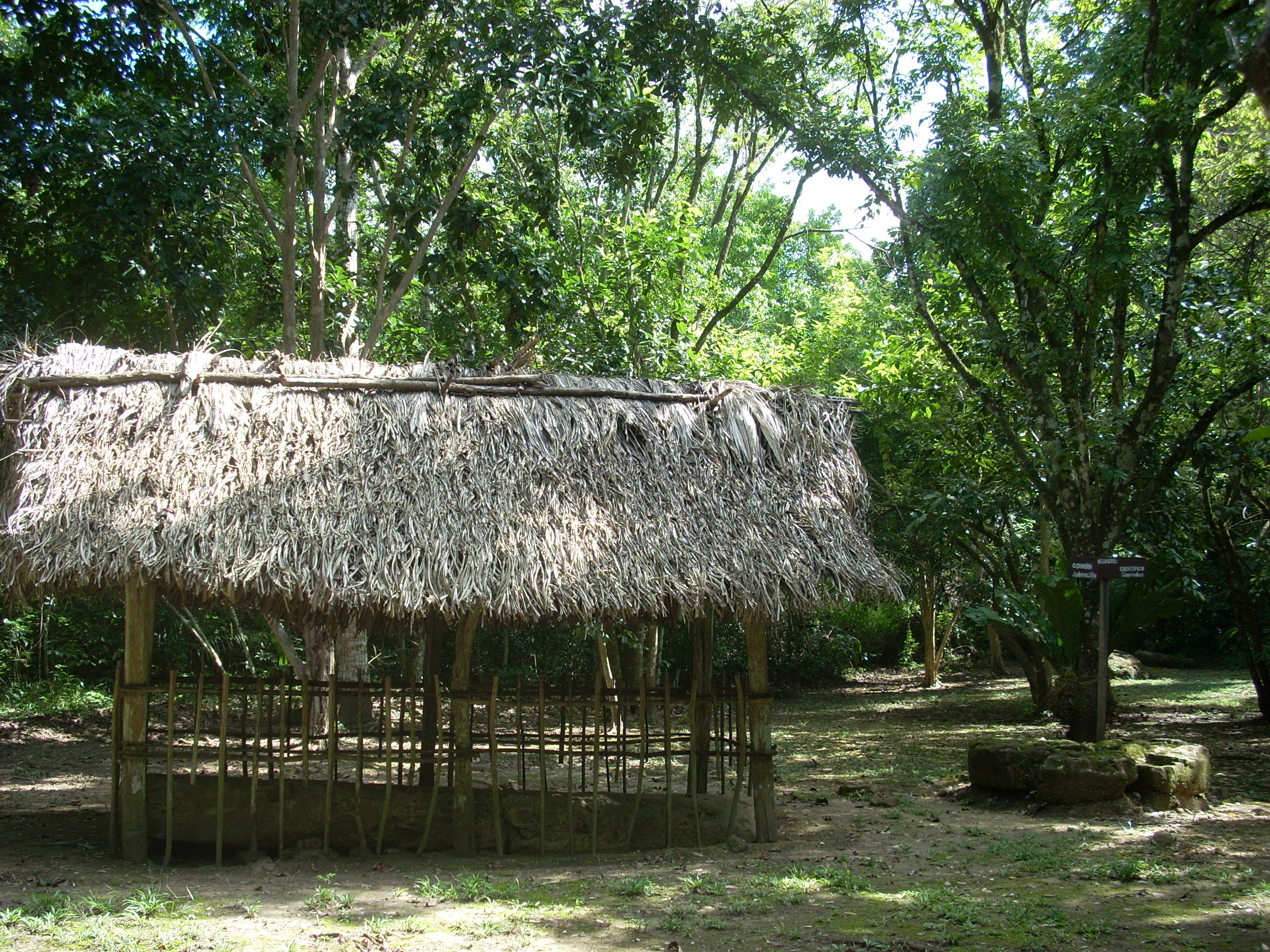

- Location within Guatemala
- 16°38′0″N 89°39′0″W
- Periods: Classic Period
- Cultures: Maya civilization
- Location: El Chal
- Region: Petén Department, Guatemala

History
- Built: Middle Preclassic Period
- Abandoned: Terminal Classic Period

Site notes
- Architectural style: Classic Maya
- Archaeologists: IDAEH

El Chal is a pre-Columbian Maya archaeological site located in the upper San Juan River valley of the southeastern Petén Basin region, Guatemala. The site is situated in the municipality of El Chal, lying some 600 metres (2,000 ft) to the south of the municipal seat also called El Chal.

El Chal was occupied from approximately 300 BC through to 1300 AD (from the Late Preclassic through to the Early Postclassic Periods of Mesoamerican chronology), although some Middle Preclassic activity has been identified in the acropolis. The Late Preclassic occupation of the city was concentrated around an E-Group ceremonial complex some 2 kilometres (1.2 mi) north of the later site core. The site's major period of occupation was during the Late Classic Period, when it was an important centre in the southeastern Petén region. Among the structures at the site is a large quadrangular residential complex, a structural type that is uncommonly found at Southern Maya lowland sites although there is a smaller one with similar characteristics at Machaquilá.

As of 2010 very little restorative work has been undertaken at the site. The archaeological site is protected by the Guatemalan Instituto de Antropología e Historia.

== Location ==
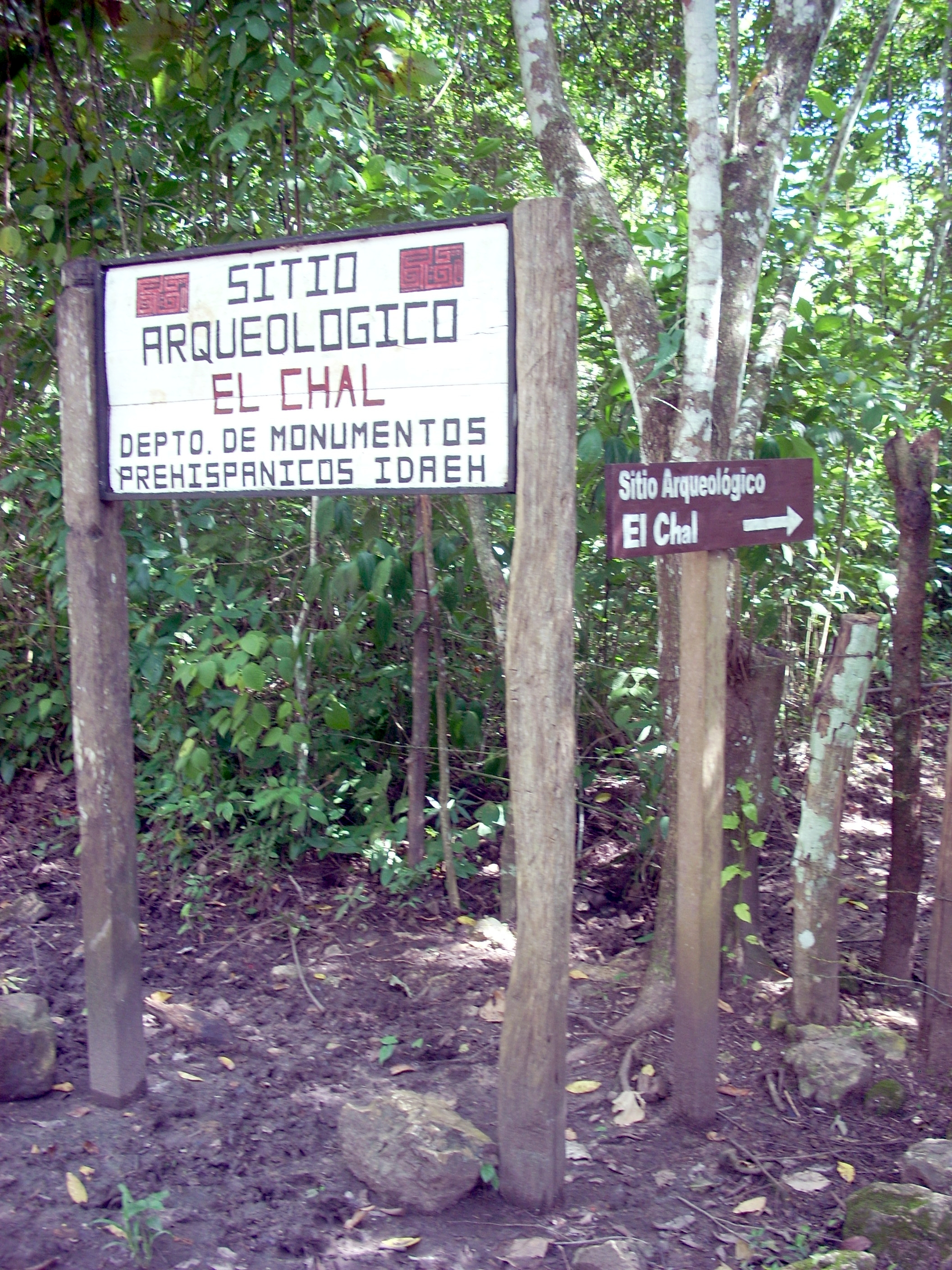
Entrance to the archaeological site

El Chal is located in the municipality of El Chal in the department of Petén in northern Guatemala. El Chal is 40 kilometres (25 mi) south of Flores, the departmental capital. The archaeological site is within the southern area of the village and municipal seat also named El Chal, 600 metres (2,000 ft) to the south of the highway to Flores. The site is situated in the central Petén wet savanna in a well-drained area not subject to seasonal flooding. The local topography is karstic in nature, and includes hills that support some of the city's architecture.

El Chal is located within the valley of the San Juan River, which is a tributary of the Pasión River, at an altitude of 270 metres (890 ft) above mean sea level. The site is situated on a natural north-south communication route between the Maya Mountains and the central Petén region. This route was used during the Colonial Period and was likely to have been inherited from pre-Conquest times.

Some of the major architecture of the site core is covered by secondary forest, including some large trees, while much of the city's remains lie within the modern village, including mounds of various sizes. Some mounds were destroyed in order to build the modern streets, in other cases the mounds were robbed of stone that was reused in modern construction. There are also instances where modern houses have been built on top of ancient mound platforms. Modern houses had previously also occupied the outskirts of the acropolis but were relocated during the Guatemalan Civil War in the late 20th century due to guerrilla activity.

== History ==
El Chal was first occupied in the Middle Preclassic Period, with ceramics associated with a burial being recovered from the acropolis. Late Preclassic occupation has only been identified in a few residential groups in the site core. During the Preclassic the centre of the city was probably situated some distance to the northeast of the Late Classic centre, where a large ritual complex is located.

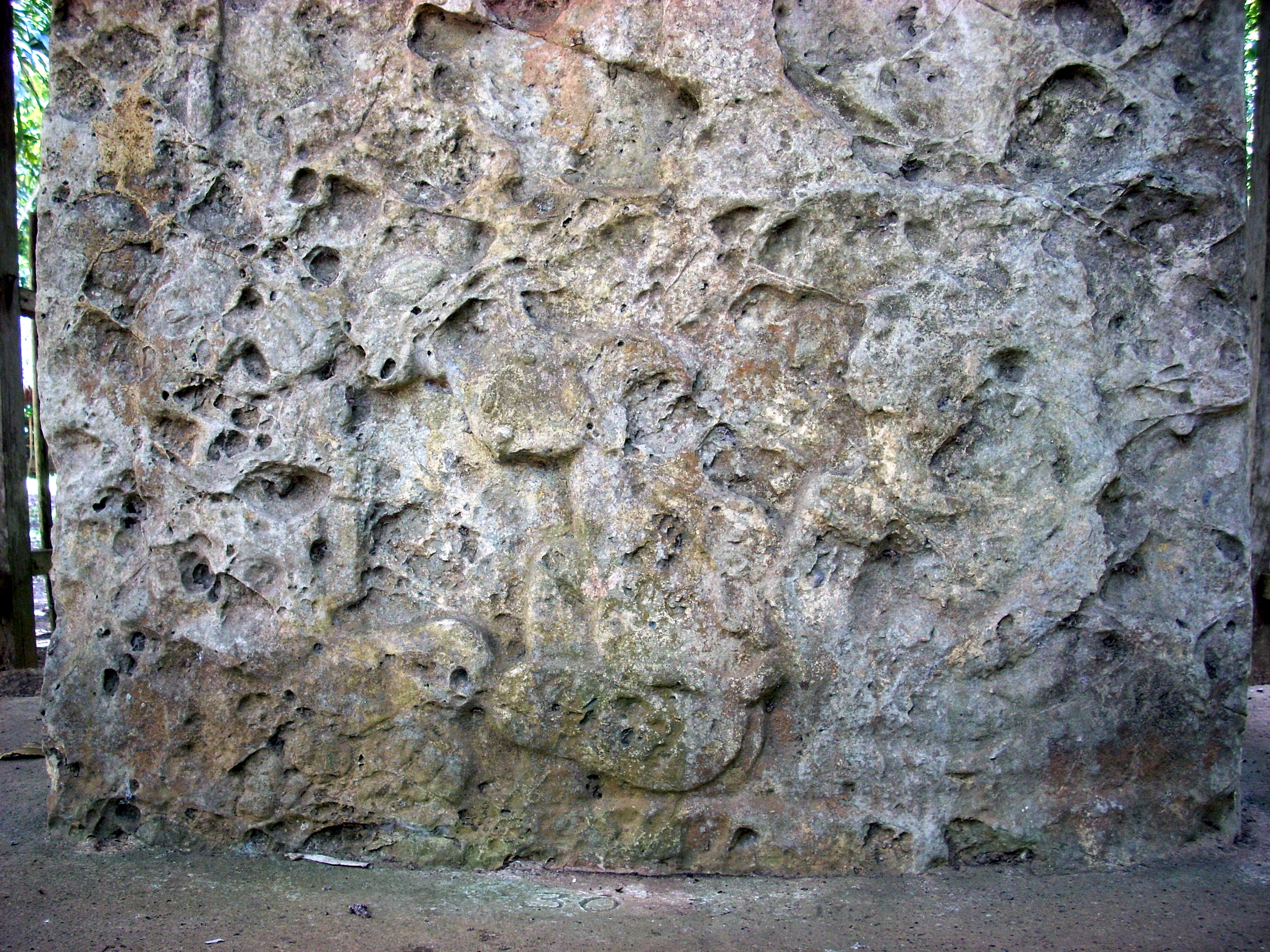
Badly eroded lower panel of Stela 4, depicting three kneeling captives

The major period of occupation at the site was during the Late Classic, when most of the major architecture was built. At this time the city centre was moved to the site core around the newly built acropolis complex. The sculpted monuments of the city indicate that it was important enough during the Late Classic to possess its own Emblem Glyph. The city experienced a period of intensive construction lasting from the Late Classic through to the Terminal Classic. All hieroglyphic texts sculpted on monuments at El Chal date to the 8th century AD, although the inscriptions are heavily eroded. The residential groups constructed upon platforms in Panorama Sector were built in the Late Classic, when a flint workshop was in production in Panorama Group 19. During the Late Classic occupation also expanded throughout the other sectors of the city; Arrepentimiento, Municipal and Central.

During the Terminal Classic, El Chal maintained its primary place in the San Juan valley. This is evidenced by major building activity in the site core where the massive structures were underwent new phases of construction and by the erection of new monuments to accompany the already existing Late Classic monuments. The continued importance of El Chal in the Terminal Classic resulted in other centres in the region being eclipsed, such as El Edén and El Tigrillo to the west and Copoja, La Puente and El Ocote to the southeast. During the Terminal Classic, El Chal developed its own ceramic production industry.

In spite of the continued intensive activity in the site core, in Panorama Sector and the other peripheral residential sectors there was a diminishing of activity compared to the Late Classic, perhaps leading up to the abandonment of the city.

Postclassic Period occupation of El Chal has been identified from ceramic fragments recovered from Structure 1 in the Northwest Plaza. A few Postclassic potsherds were also excavated from Group 15 in the Central Sector.

=== Modern history ===
The name El Chal first appears on a Spanish Colonial watercolour from 1735 together with other villages in the region, with the name of El Chal or El Chacal. It also appears on a map of central and southeastern Petén from 1860, together with Poptún, Concepción, San Clemente and the ruins of Ixkun. Some of the stonework from the ruins has been stripped to be used in the construction of the modern village.

The site was visited by archaeologists Richard Kirsch and Ian Graham in 1974 and 1975 but their work was never published. In 1975, the Department of Prehispanic Monuments at IDAEH designated it as a protected site covering roughly 0.07 square kilometres (0.027 sq mi). In 1989 the Atlas Arqueológico de Guatemala mapped the site and catalogued the remaining monuments. In 1993 the first test excavations took place and an area of 4 square kilometres (1.5 sq mi) around the site core was explored.

In the 1970s some sculpted monuments were removed from El Chal by FYDEP (Fomento y Desarrollo del Petén - "Petén Patronage and Development") and were later transferred to the Tikal National Park. By the mid-1990s the exact location and identity of these monuments had been lost.

Further excavations have taken place since the 1990s, including investigations of the West Plaza in 2003, the East Plaza in 2004, the acropolis in 2005–2006 and the Northwest Plaza in 2006.

== Site description ==
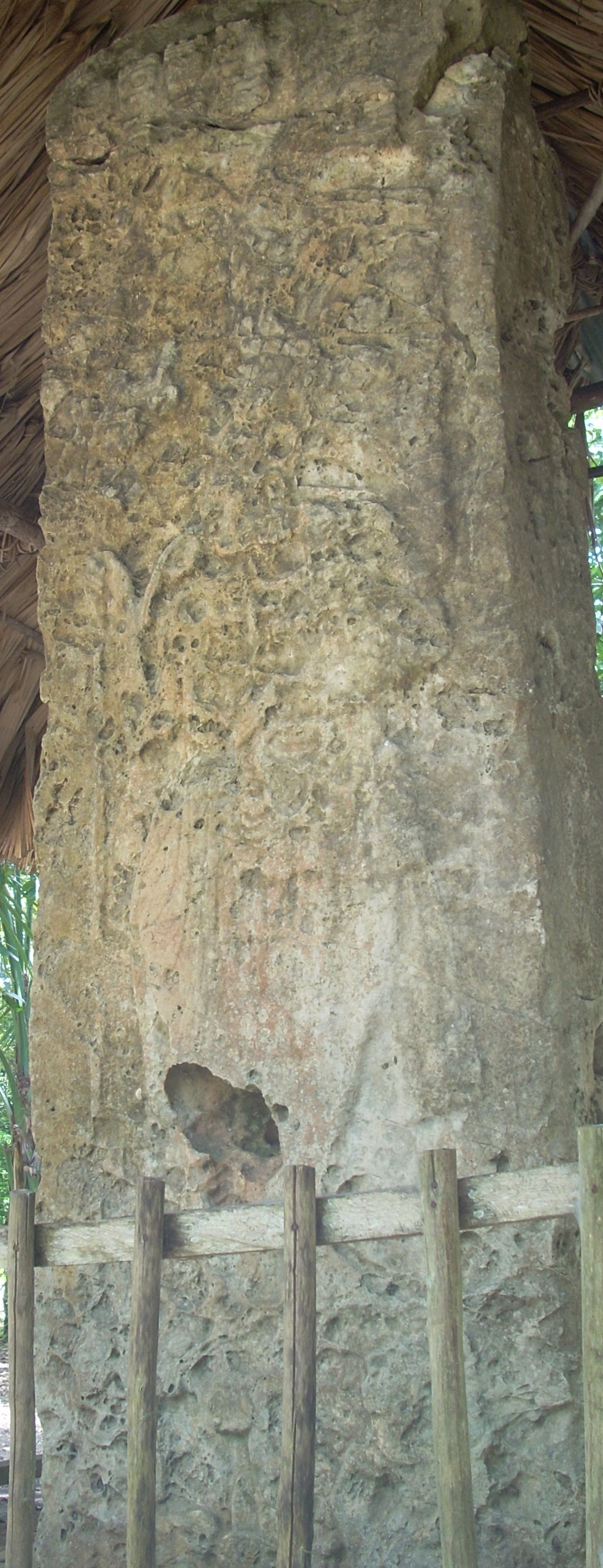
Front of Stela 4 showing an 8th-century ruler

The site core of El Chal consists of an acropolis and three ceremonial plazas in which the majority of sculpted monuments were found, the East Plaza, West Plaza and Northeast Plaza. There are also a number of other plazas in the site core. The plazas and the majority of the residential structures were laid out upon naturally level terrain, while the acropolis was built upon a natural limestone hill and a very few residential groups were built upon artificial basal platforms.

A reservoir is located to the northwest of the acropolis. It was built with irregular limestone blocks and measures 65 metres (213 ft) across. In the rain season it fills to a depth of 2 metres (6.6 ft) and contains 400 cubic metres (14,000 cu ft). A second, natural reservoir, is located to the south of the artificial reservoir and west of the acropolis. In the rain season it also fills to a depth of 2 metres (6.6 ft).

The large ritual complex of El Chal was located a considerable distance to the northeast of the civic centre of the city and was probably first built in the Preclassic Period.

Archaeologists have mapped 268 structures clustered in 53 groups around approximately 68 patios in the site core. Residential structures were concentrated in the area surrounding the ceremonial centre, especially on the north and west sides near to the reservoir. Residences tended to be larger the closer they were to the reservoir. The residential area of El Chal was extensive and archaeologists have divided it into four sectors. Municipal consists of the area occupied by the modern village, El Arrepentimiento is the northeastern portion of the site, Panorama is the northwestern area, and Central is the site core. Central El Chal contains 25 groups, Arrepentimiento contains 40 groups, Panorama contains 53 groups and Municipal contains 18 groups. Panorama was an area of chert production while Municipal is associated with the ritual complex of the city.

=== Central Sector ===
==== Acropolis ====
The acropolis was built on a 30-metre (98 ft) high limestone hill. The base is almost square, measuring 140 metres (460 ft) on each side. The acropolis complex faced northwards onto the south side of the West Plaza. The upper part of the hill was levelled into three wide terraces with an average area of 2,800 square metres (30,000 sq ft). The terraces were linked by a sunken stairway on the north side of the acropolis. The architecture of the acropolis is arranged in six groups.

===== Terraces =====
Terrace 1 is the highest terrace in the acropolis. It supports three small patios labelled as Patios A, B and C. These patios are laid out between 10 structures. Among the structures found on Terrace 1, Structures 1, 3, 5 and 6 have been excavated by archaeologists. Structure 5 is the largest, on the west side of Patio A. Terrace 1 has been dated to the Late and Terminal Classic. A complex stairway divided into three flights gave access to the terrace from the south side. The upper flight descended seven steps to a small room measuring 1.3 by 1.5 metres (4.3 by 4.9 ft). These steps had a tread of 0.3 metres (0.98 ft) and a riser of 0.25 metres (0.82 ft). The second flight descended from the small room to another similar room, and the third flight descended in the opposite direction to the terrace supporting Patio F (Terrace 3). The wall of the upper flight was decorated with a sculpted bas-relief frame, the wall of the middle flight was coated with stucco and were painted with a red and black design.

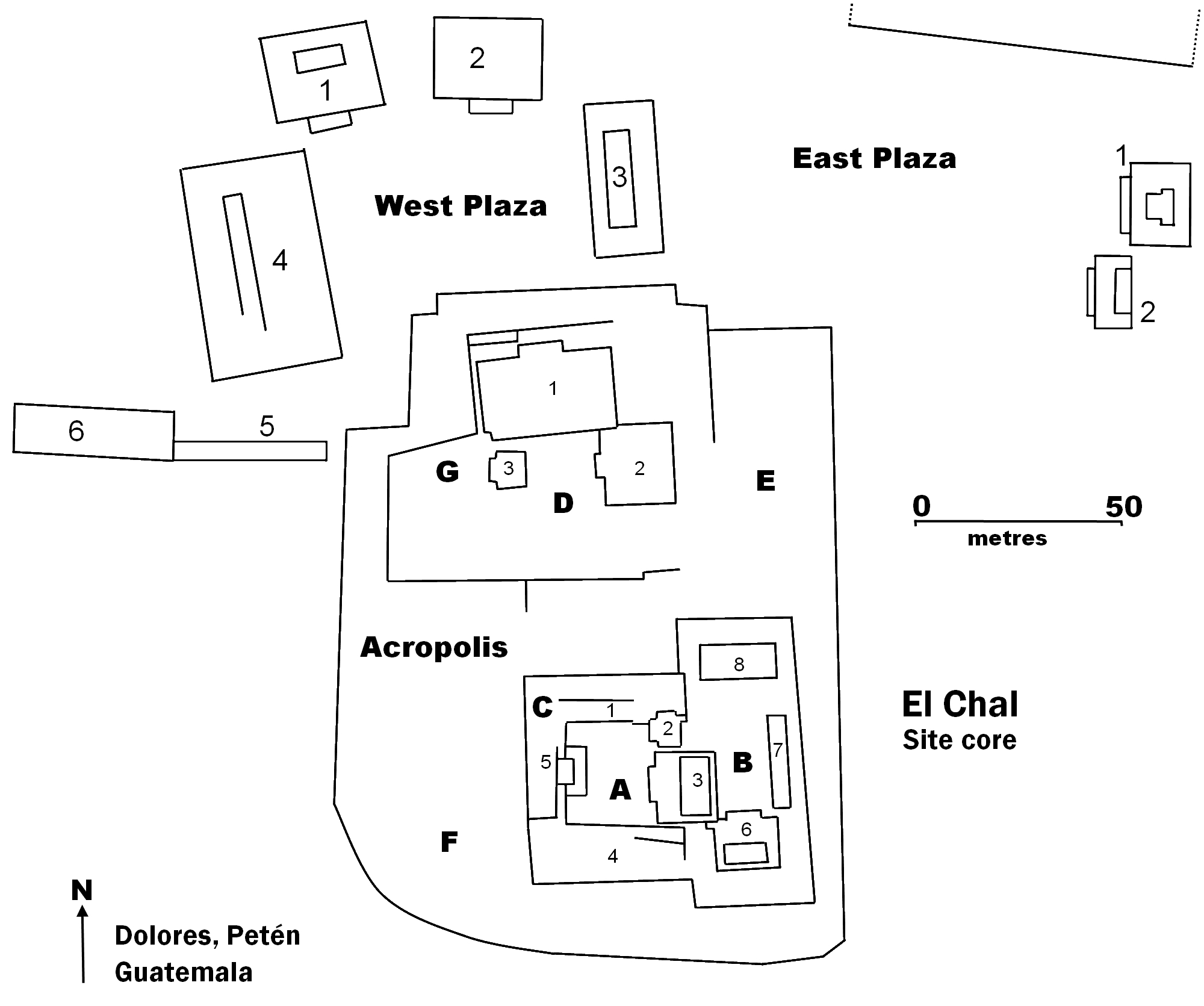
Map of the site core showing the acropolis, and the East and West Plazas.

Terrace 2 is situated 10 metres (33 ft) below Terrace 1. It is divided into two patios (Patios D and E) by a 9-metre (30 ft) high pyramid temple. Patio D was accessed via a stairway from the West Plaza directly to the north, the stairway rose in two sections with a minor terrace between them, referred to as the Lower Terrace. The lower section of the stairway measured 59 metres (194 ft) long, extending 5 metres (16 ft) into the plaza at its lower end. Material excavated from the area around the stairway where it joined the base of the acropolis has been dated to the Late and Terminal Classic. Patio D itself was laid out at the very beginning of the Late Classic Period. It was resurfaced a number of times in the Late Classic, and the earliest of the surrounding structures were built at this time. Additional structures were built in the Terminal Classic, and the patio area was extended with the construction of the adjacent Patio G. Patio E was also accessed via a stairway from the base of the acropolis, although it is very poorly preserved. Ceramics recovered from the western portion of the Lower Terrace dated it to the Late and Terminal Classic. A low platform was excavated in the extreme southwestern corner of the Lower Terrace, although most of the ceramic finds were dated to the Terminal Classic, some pieces dating to the Late Preclassic were also found.

Terrace 3 is located on the southwest side of the acropolis at the same height as Terrace 2. It supports one residential patio group, Patio F, formed by five structures.

===== Patio A =====
Patio A was formed by a group of 5 buildings serving a dual residential and administrative function. Evidence of this is the fact that the structures in the group were divided into multiple rooms with internal benches, a form of architecture that is recognised as being a palace and that may serve for either elite domestic or administrative activity. The stone blocks used in construction measured approximately 40 centimetres (16 in) on each side with a finely dressed front face, tapering towards the back in order to grip the structural fill. This patio is situated on the west side of the main terrace of the acropolis, Terrace 1. Patio A has an area of 432 square metres (4,650 sq ft), with the largest building on the west side. Patio B lies to the east and Patio C to the west, a lower terrace supports Patio F to the southwest and Patio D to the north. The patio was accessed via a short 3-step stairway on the southeast side.

Excavations identified 3 construction phases in Patio A, with the first two dating to the Late Classic and the final phase dating to the Terminal Classic.

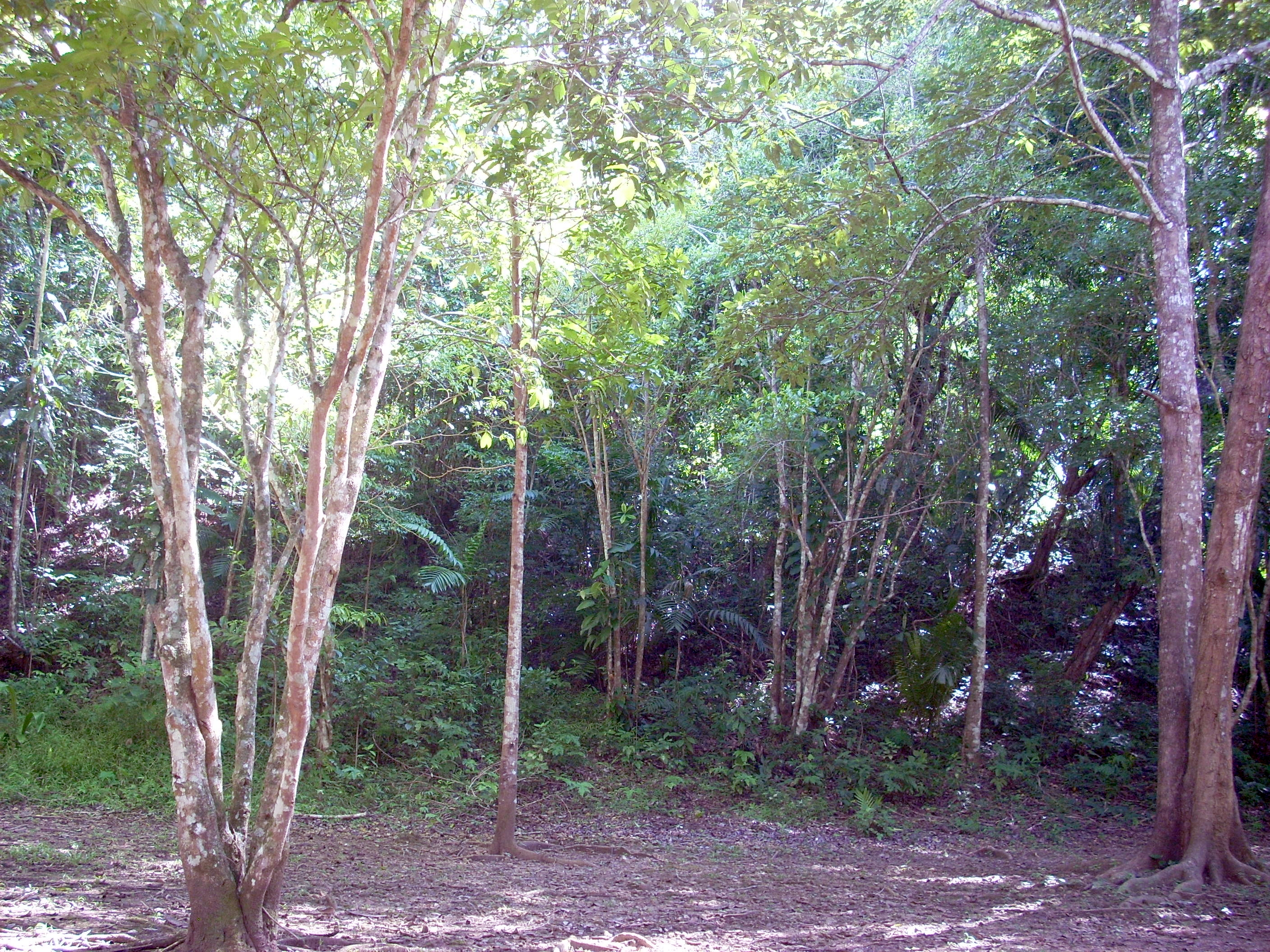
The heavily forested acropolis as seen from the West Plaza

Terrace 1 Structure 1 is on the north side of Patio A. It consists of a long platform access via a 23-metre (75 ft) wide stairway on the south side. The stairway had three steps, each with a tread of 0.6 metres (2.0 ft) and a riser measuring 0.35 metres (1.1 ft). Structure 1 experienced two construction phases, in the Late Classic and in the Terminal Classic. In its final form it measured 34 metres (112 ft) long by 8.5 metres (28 ft) wide and stood 1.4 metres (4.6 ft) high. The superstructure of the building possessed a C-shaped bench.

Terrace 1 Structure 2 is on the northeast side of Patio A. It was a single level platform measuring 8 by 5 metres (26 by 16 ft) by 2 metres (6.6 ft) high. It was accessed via a projecting stairway measuring 5 metres (16 ft) wide and protruding 1.5 metres (4.9 ft) from the structure. The five steps each had a tread of 0.25 metres (0.82 ft) and a riser measuring 0.24 metres (0.79 ft). Archaeologists were unable to investigate the summit of Structure 2 due to the large size of the trees growing upon it. The structure clearly shows two construction phases, the first dating to the Late Classic and the second to the Terminal Classic. Finds dating to the Middle Preclassic were recovered from trenches sunk into the patio in front of the structure, consisting of 378 potsherds associated with Burial 265. A Late Classic cache was also found at the base of the stairway, consisting of 2 eccentric obsidian artefacts shaped like centipedes, a flint arrowhead, various pieces of waste flint, and a number of flint blades and obsidian prismatic blades.

Terrace 1 Structure 3 is on the east side of Patio A and separates it from Patio B. Structure 3 was built in two construction phases. The first phase was covered in stucco and raised 1.3 metres (4.3 ft) above the level of the patio. The second phase consisted of a square platform that was 1.8 metres (5.9 ft) high. A bench on the east side of the platform raised the height to 2.1 metres (6.9 ft) above the floor of the patio. Structure 3 was built from small limestone blocks around a rubble core. In its final form the structure was a rectangular platform measuring 17 by 14.5 metres (56 by 48 ft) and standing 3 metres (9.8 ft) high. The stairway measured 7.5 metres (25 ft) wide and was divided into two by a 2.5 metres (8.2 ft) block. The platform supported a bench measuring 13.5 by 7 metres (44 by 23 ft). An incomplete human skeleton was found next to the south wall (Burial 73), together with broken ceramic fragments dating to the Terminal Classic. Although material excavated from the two construction phases has been dated to the Late Preclassic and the Early Classic, this material is believed to have been transported there and used as infill during the Late Classic construction of the building and not to represent earlier phases of the structure itself.

Terrace 1 Structure 4 is on the south side of Patio A. The earliest version of the building measured 31 by 6.5 metres (102 by 21 ft). It supported a room that measured 28.5 by 2.5 metres (93.5 by 8.2 ft) with three doorways. The central door was 3.5 metres (11 ft) wide and the flanking doorways measured 1.2 metres (3.9 ft) wide. The front of the building was dominated by a bench that ran the entire width of the structure and became a 9-metre (30 ft) wide stairway descending to the patio and extending 1.5 metres (4.9 ft) from the platform. The stairway had 3 steps, each with a height of 0.3 metres (0.98 ft) and a tread of 0.4 metres (1.3 ft). The first construction phase included a 1-metre (3.3 ft) high wall that was later covered by the stucco floor of a small north-facing room. On the east side of the structure, the walls were still found to stand to a height of 2.55 metres (8.4 ft). Structure 4 was deliberately demolished in antiquity. The second construction phase extended the building to a size of 31 by 8.5 metres (102 by 28 ft). It supported three rooms with benches, the combined width of the rooms was 28.5 metres (94 ft) by 2.5 metres (8.2 ft). The same three doors from the earlier phase continued in use.

Terrace 1 Structure 5 is on the west side of Patio A. It consists of a single platform that is the highest in the entire acropolis. It measures 19.5 by 6 metres (64 by 20 ft) and was 1.5 metres (4.9 ft) high. Structure 5 was joined to Structures 1 and 4 since its earliest phase of construction. Structure 5 was accessed by a projecting stairway that ascended the east side, it measured 5.5 metres (18 ft) wide and protruded 2.6 metres (8.5 ft) from the platform. The stairway joins a 2.25-metre (7.4 ft) talud wall topped by a 0.8-metre (2.6 ft) high cornice that projects 10 centimetres (3.9 in) from the talud wall. The walls of Structure 5 were built from finely dressed limestone blocks. No trace of any superstructure was found on top of the platform, nor was any earlier substructure identified. Only the lowest courses of limestone blocks were found to be still in place and it is believed that the upper courses were stripped in antiquity. Finds made near the southeast corner of Structure 5 include a piece of a greenstone axe, two spherical stones, pieces of human bone (labelled as Burial 70) and a concentration of broken domestic ceramics. These finds are believed to represent activity from the very end of the Terminal Classic prior to the abandonment of the site. Burial 278, that of an infant, was found under the floor of Structure 5 and was dated to the Late Classic.

===== Patio B =====
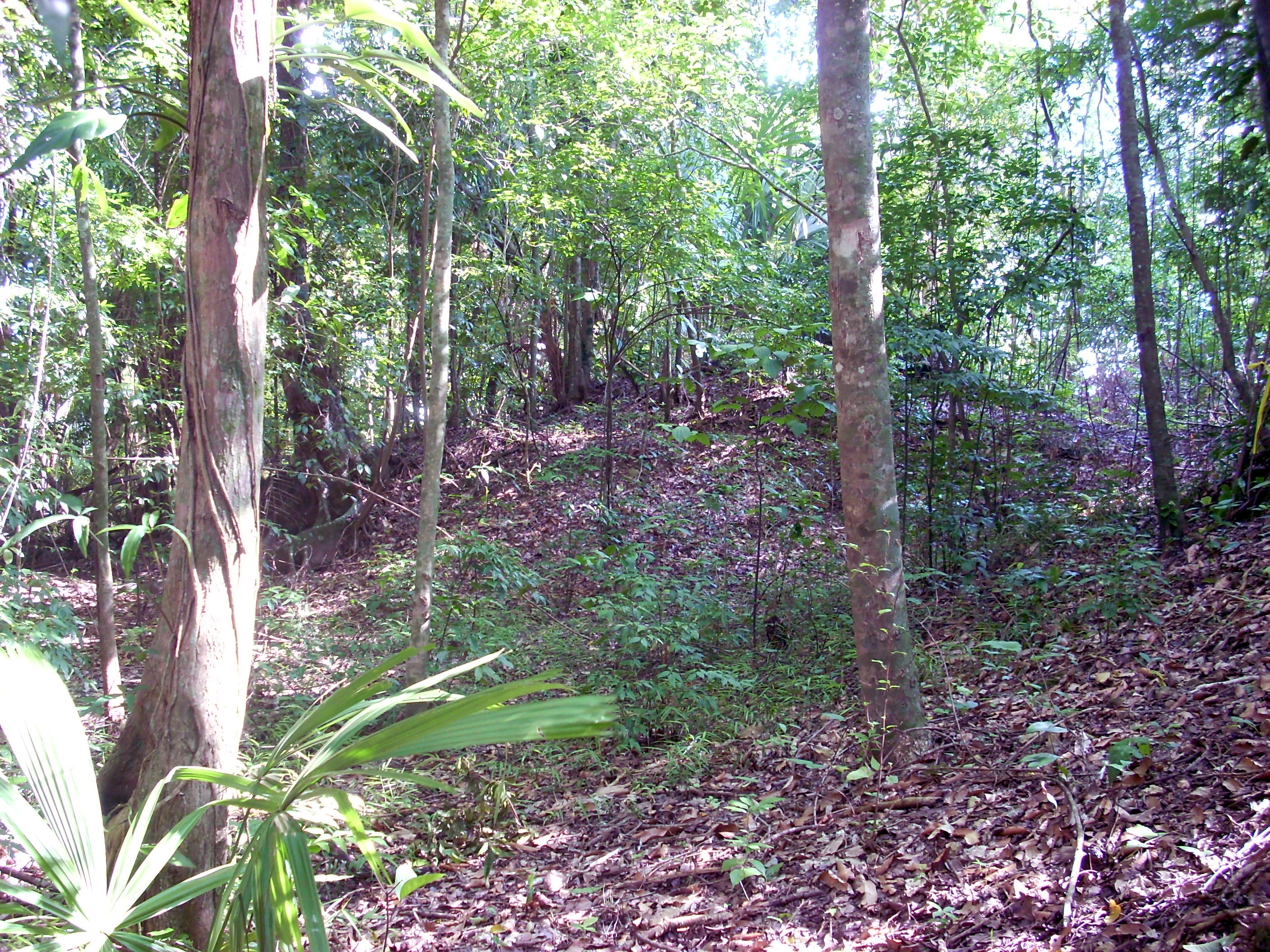
Structures on Terrace 1 of the acropolis

Patio B was filled with a large amount of rubble in order to bring it up to the same level as the pre-existing Patio A, which lies immediately to the west. It is an enclosed courtyard with an area of 768 square metres (8,270 sq ft). Three structures were built upon the new patio, closing it on the north, east and south sides, while the west side was enclosed by Structures 1,2 and 3 of Patio A.

Terrace 1 Structure 6 is on the south side of Patio B. It is a square platform with two stepped levels. After the last phase of construction it had two benches on the top and a wide projecting stairway on the north side, it measures 9 metres (30 ft) wide. The structure measures 14.5 by 12.5 metres (48 by 41 ft), the first bench measures 11 by 5 metres (36 by 16 ft) and the second 10 by 3 metres (32.8 by 9.8 ft). Various human bone fragments, representing pieces of three individuals, were excavated together with domestic ceramics. A smaller second stairway jutted from the southeast corner of the building. Structure 6 has been dated to the Late and Terminal Classic.

Terrace 1 Structure 7 is a low platform on the east side of Patio B. It measured 22.5 by 4 metres (74 by 13 ft) and stood 0.64 metres (2.1 ft) high. Upon the platform was a 1.5-metre (4.9 ft) wide bench, and a single 9.5 metres (31 ft) wide step lead down to the patio. Excavations of the platform uncovered material that was dated to the Late Preclassic, Late Classic and Terminal Classic. Structure 7 was the last to be built on Patio B, postdating the construction of Structures 6 and 8.

Terrace 1 Structure 8 is on the north side of Patio B. It is a rectangular platform measuring 18 by 8.5 metres (59 by 28 ft) with a 5-metre (16 ft) wide south-facing embedded stairway. The structure was not completely explored due to the dense vegetation covering it.

===== Patio C =====
Patio C was added to Terrace 1 at the same time as Patio B, using a large amount of rubble to extend the terrace. It is to the northwest of Patio A and is slightly lower than it. Patio C is bordered by 2 structures, on the north and west sides, with the West Structure being the largest. The fill beneath the patio has a depth of 6 metres (20 ft), which was previously the height of the retaining talud wall of the northwest side of Patio A, as found during excavations. Patio C had 2 construction phases and served an administrative function directly associated with the buildings of Patio A.

The West Structure contained a 1.2-metre (3.9 ft) wide room accessed via a 0.7-metre (2.3 ft) wide doorway. The rear room of the structure contained a bench, or throne, that measured 2.4 by 2.95 metres (7.9 by 9.7 ft) and stood 0.45 metres (1.5 ft) high. Material recovered from the structure has been dated to the Late and Terminal Classic Periods, with a small amount dating to the Postclassic.

The North Structure was a low platform that was covered with stucco and painted red.

===== Patio D =====
Terrace 2 Structure 1 is on the north side of Patio D. It is a low rectangular platform measuring 2 metres (6.6 ft) high. Its walls rest upon the last surface layer of the patio and the structure's surface was littered with abundant Terminal Classic ceramic remains. A sunken stairway climbed the structure at a point 10 metres (33 ft) from the southeast corner. The tread of the steps measured 0.5 metres (1.6 ft) deep while the risers measured 0.2 metres (0.66 ft) high. During the Late Classic this structure apparently had an administrative function. However, by the Terminal Classic it was used as a domestic building, as evidenced by the abundant ceramics and stone artefacts recovered, the latter include a fragment of a metate milling stone, an obsidian knife and two flint knives.

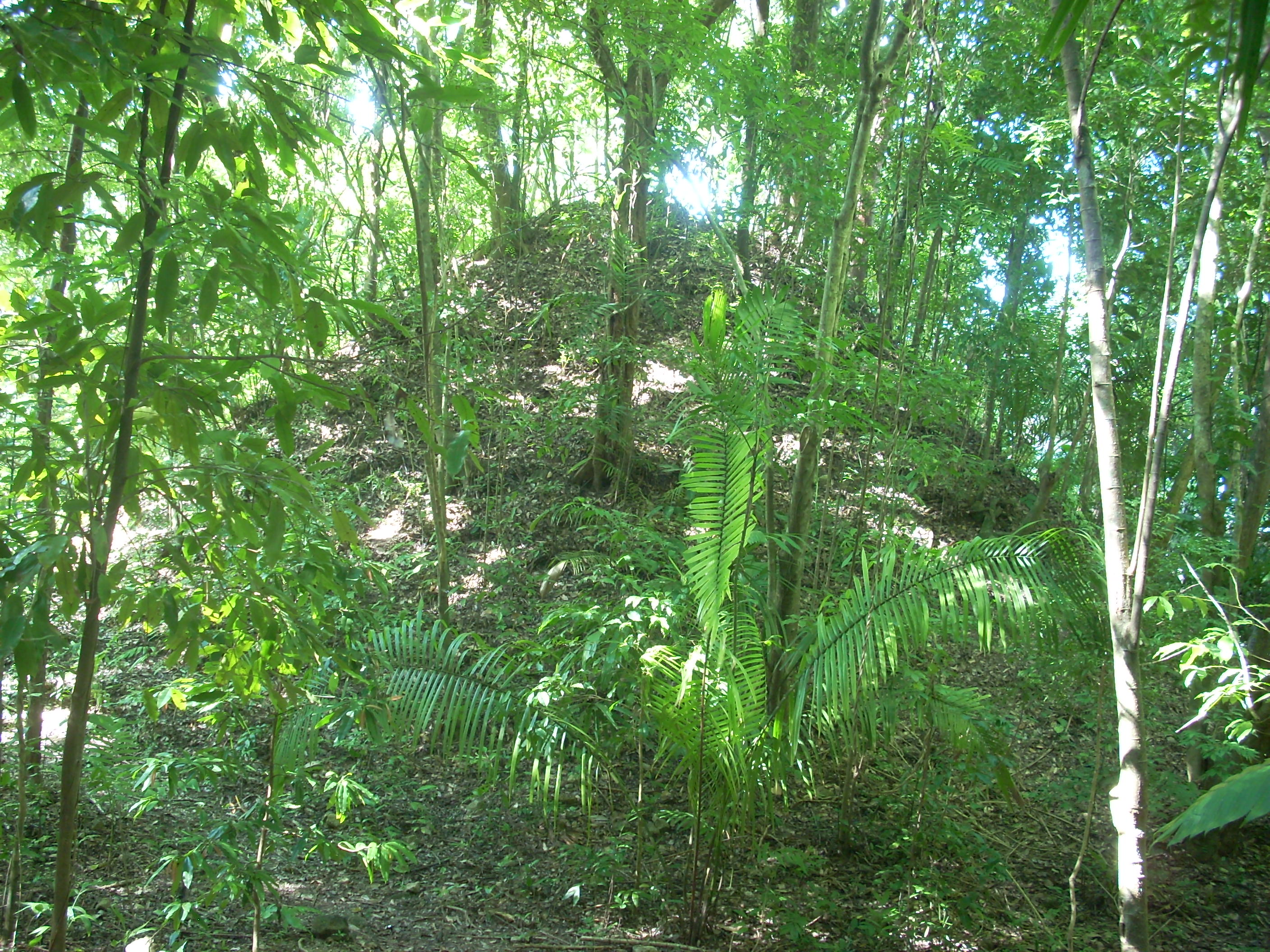
Unrestored pyramid on the acropolis

Terrace 2 Structure 2 is on the east side of Patio D. It was a 9-metre (30 ft) tall pyramidal platform that did not possess a summit superstructure. The upper east side of the pyramid has collapsed and looters' trenches on the west side were filled in by IDAEH in 1991. The walls possessed taluds and excavations uncovered traces of red paint. The stairway faced west onto Patio D, the treads measured 0.2 metres (0.66 ft) and the risers 0.25 metres (0.82 ft). The stairway projected 1.3 metres (4.3 ft) into the patio from the pyramid. A burial cist was found near the front of the pyramid, it was labelled as Burial 264 and was dated to the Late Classic. The platform had five layers of stucco flooring. Material recovered during excavation of the stairway dated to the Terminal Classic.

Terrace 2 Structure 3 encloses the west side of Patio D. Structure 3 does not face onto Patio D but rather is part of the Terminal Classic construction activity that extended Terrace 2 with the addition of Patio G. The structure measured 7.8 metres (26 ft) from east to west. Excavated artefacts around the base have been dated to the Late and Terminal Classic. The stairway is on the west side, facing onto Patio G. The structure is believed to have been built in a single burst of activity in the Terminal Classic. It had two stepped levels and a north-south stairway was identified upon the summit of the structure.

===== Patio F =====
Patio F is on a terrace at the same level as Patios D and E. The patio is a closed courtyard formed by 5 structures on the west and south sides, while the other two sides are formed by the retaining walls of Patios A and C. The structures were residential buildings built upon low platforms, with the principal structure on the south side of the patio. A long, low platform on the west side supports two structures, labelled as Structures 1 and 2. Excavations of this platform recovered ceramic remains dating to the Late and Terminal Classic.

Structure 1 measures 19.3 metres (63 ft) north-south by 4.8 metres (16 ft) east-west and was built upon the same platform that supports Structure 2. The structure had a single room measuring 7.5 by 2 metres (24.6 by 6.6 ft), which contained a bench.

Structure 2 is to the south of Structure 1, resting upon the same basal platform. It measured 7.1 by 5.6 metres (23 by 18 ft) with a room measuring 4.44 by 1.66 metres (14.6 by 5.4 ft).

Structure 3 was built directly upon Patio F, and is therefore lower than Structures 1 and 2. It was on the southwest side of Patio F and measured 6.2 by 5.3 metres (20 by 17 ft) and had a 2.13-metre (7.0 ft) wide projecting stairway extending 0.66 metres (2.2 ft) from the facade. Ceramics from the structure were largely dated to the Terminal Classic, with a few pieces dating to the Postclassic.

Structure 4 was located on the south side of Patio F. Ceramics from the structure were dated to the Terminal Classic.

==== East Plaza ====
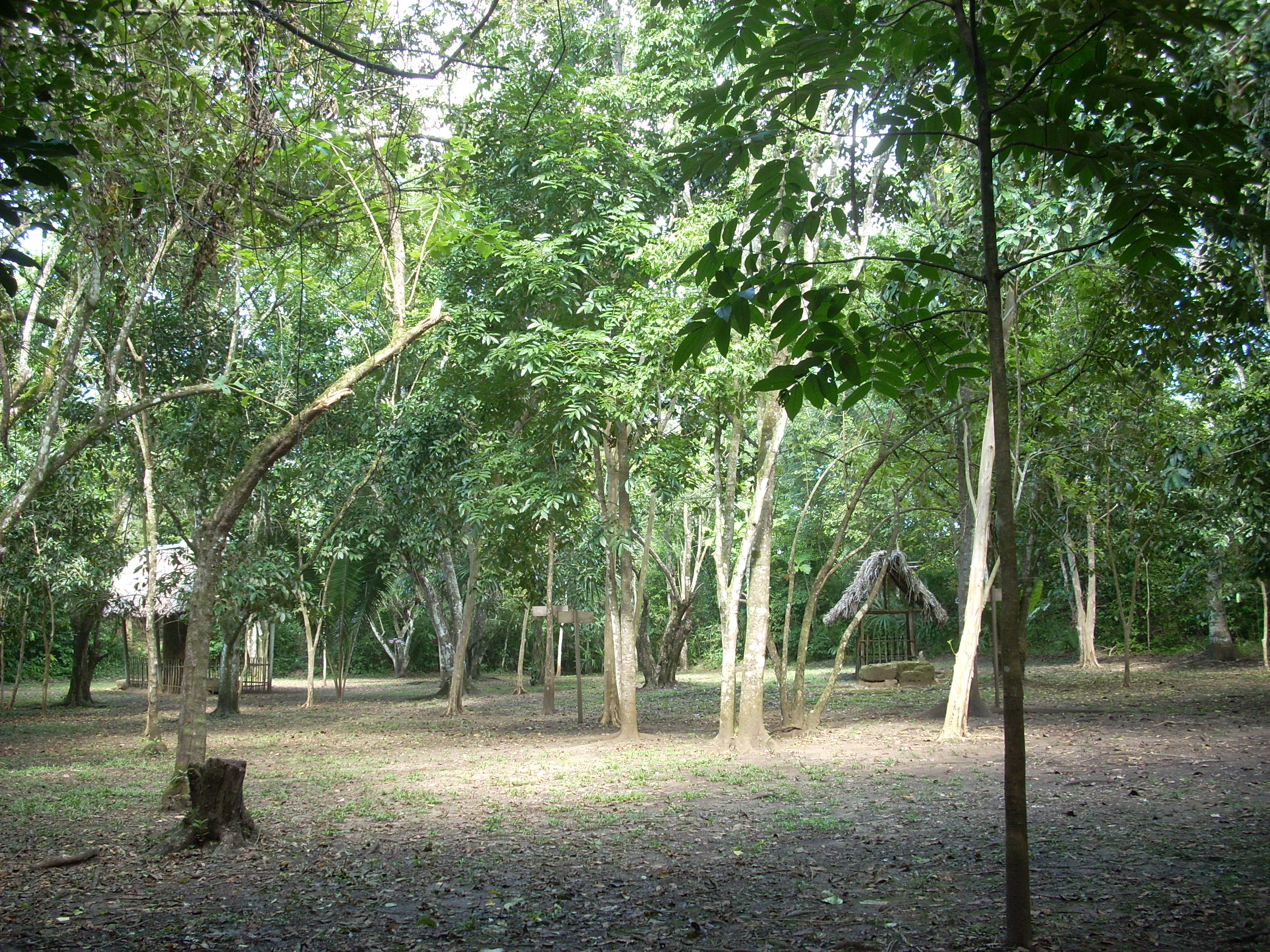
The East Plaza

The East Plaza covers an area of 6,300 square metres (68,000 sq ft), making it the largest open ceremonial space in the entire city. On its east side it is delimited by 2 medium-height structures (East Plaza Structures 1 and 2), on the south side by the base of the acropolis, on the west side by Structure 3 of the West Plaza and on the north side by the South Structure of the Northeast Plaza. Six stelae and three altars were found in the East Plaza. The plaza had two construction phases, the first dated to the Late Classic and the second to the Terminal Classic. A few Late Preclassic ceramic fragments were also recovered. The levelling of the East Plaza involved a considerable inversion of labour due to the limestone bedrock being extremely close to the surface at one side and 2 metres (6.6 ft) under the surface at the other.

East Plaza Structure 1 is on the east side of the plaza. In its final form it was a platform with two levels standing to a total height of 7 metres (23 ft). It measured 20 metres (66 ft) north-south by 15 metres (49 ft) east-west. The structure had a 2-metre (6.6 ft) wide stairway climbing from the plaza on the west side, the stairway was 10 metres (33 ft) long. The lower level was the main platform. It was built from finely dressed limestone blocks. The upper level was built of very poor quality limestone and is extremely badly preserved. A bench was built on top of the structure. It measured 8 by 3 metres (26.2 by 9.8 ft) with a protruding section measuring 3 by 5 metres (9.8 by 16.4 ft). The bench was 25 centimetres (9.8 in) high. A large number of flint chippings were excavated from the structure. They have been dated to the Late Classic.

East Plaza Structure 2 is also on the east side of the plaza. It is a rectangular platform measuring 17 by 10 metres (56 by 33 ft) and facing westwards onto the plaza itself. A stairway climbs the west side of the building. It measures 12 by 1.2 metres (39.4 by 3.9 ft). The platform supports a bench measuring 12 by 3 metres (39.4 by 9.8 ft). The broken remains of Stela 6 are scattered in front of the structure. Relatively few ceramic remains were found associated with this structure. Those that were have been dated to the Terminal Classic, although a pit sunk into the summit uncovered remains dating to the Late Classic at a depth of 1 metre (3.3 ft). Lithic artefacts included a piece of an obsidian knife.

==== West Plaza ====
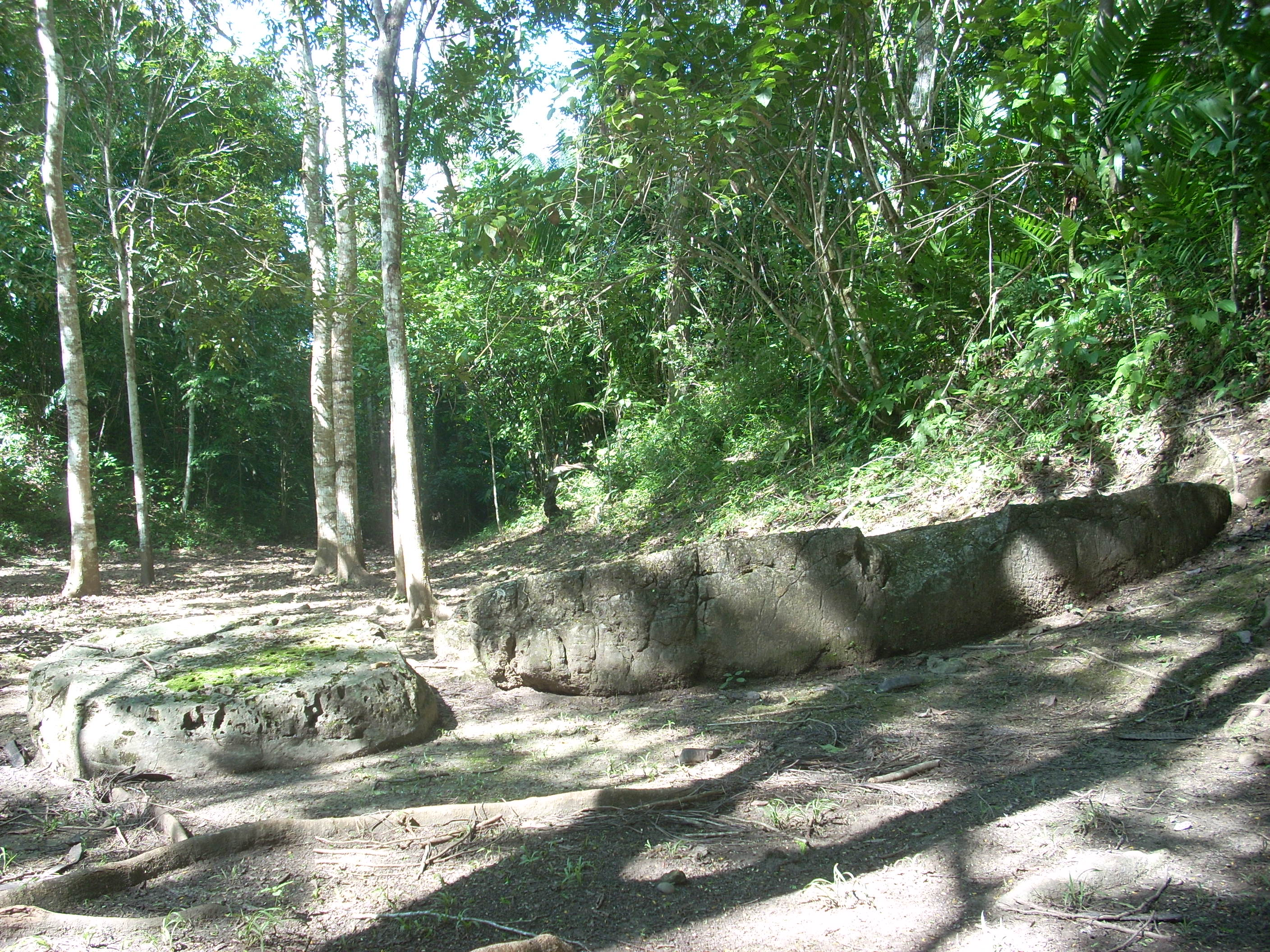
Fallen stela with associated altar in the West Plaza

The West Plaza covers an area of 3,500 square metres (38,000 sq ft). The south side of the plaza is formed by the north side of the acropolis and the plaza is also enclosed by four structures that measure more than 5 metres (16 ft) high. The highest structure is on the west side and measures 13 metres (43 ft) high. A 7.5-metre-wide (25 ft) series of three steps stretched between the north wall of Structure 4 and the southwest corner of Structure 1 and gave access to the Northwest Plaza. These steps had a 0.5-metre (1.6 ft) tread and were 0.2 metres (0.66 ft) high. Six monuments were found in the West Plaza. During the final phase of occupation during the Terminal Classic, refuse found at the base of the acropolis indicates that the West Plaza was occupied as a residential area, with the inhabitants using flimsy perishable structures.

West Plaza Structure 1 is on the north side of the West Plaza, near the northwest corner. The structure faces southwards onto the plaza and has a stairway that measures 12 by 3 metres (39.4 by 9.8 ft) climbing the front of the building. The final version of the structure measured 27 by 20 metres (89 by 66 ft). A bench on the summit of the structure measures 22 by 4 metres (72 by 13 ft). The structure has two phases of construction, the earliest of which dates to the Late Classic.

West Plaza Structure 2 is on the north side of the West Plaza. It is a rectangular platform measuring 27 by 20 metres (89 by 66 ft) with a projecting stairway on the south side that measures 12 by 3 metres (39.4 by 9.8 ft). It is the only building on the West Plaza that did not possess a bench upon the summit. A number of potsherds dating to the Terminal Classic were recovered from the front of the platform.

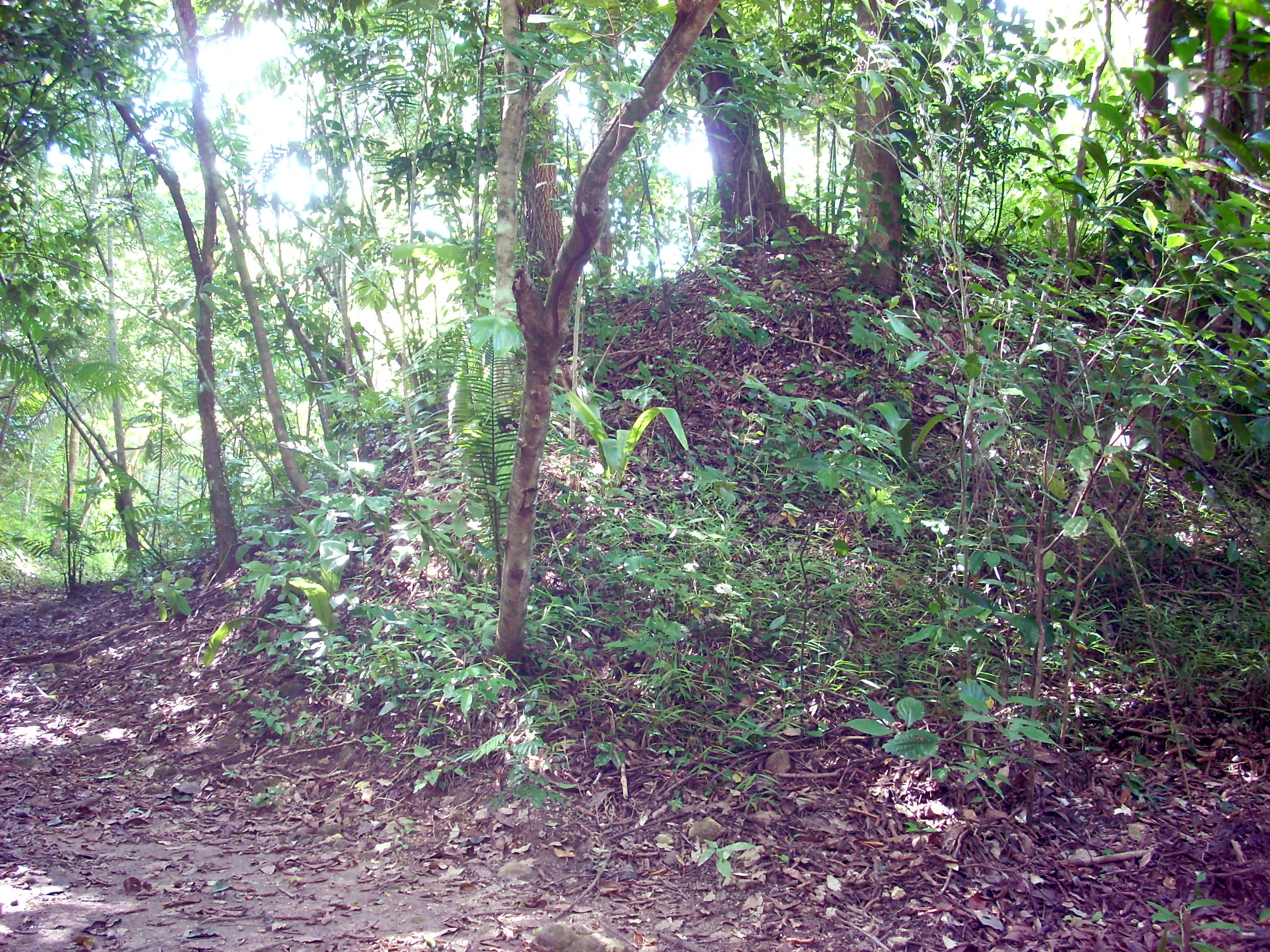
West Plaza Structure 3 seen from the East Plaza

West Plaza Structure 3 is on the east side of the West Plaza and separates it from the East Plaza. It is a rectangular building with a wide stairway climbing from the west. The structure measures 38 by 18 metres (125 by 59 ft) and possesses a bench on the summit that measures 25 by 6 metres (82 by 20 ft). After its final construction phase the platform stood 4.45 metres (14.6 ft) high. A pit sunk into the structure revealed the presence of two earlier substructures. The first was 2.85 metres (9.4 ft) high and the second stood 3.15 metres (10.3 ft) high. All three stages were filled with a rubble core, although the earliest stage consisted of larger pieces than the latter stages. Various artefacts were recovered from the southwest corner of the final stage of the stairway, including pieces of flint, obsidian blades, metates (milling stones) and a large amount of domestic ceramics.

===== Structure 4 =====
West Plaza Structure 4 is on the west side of the West Plaza and is the tallest structure at El Chal. The platform measures 46 metres (151 ft) north-south and 30 metres (98 ft) east-west; it has a rectangular base that was formed of three stepped sections. The lowest section measured 1.83 metres (6.0 ft) high with a 1.3 metres (4.3 ft) wide platform between its upper edge and the beginning of the second section. The middle section was 1.2 metres (3.9 ft) high with a 0.6-metre-wide (2.0 ft) platform between its upper edge and the base of the upper section. The wall of the top section is poorly preserved with just two courses of stonework remaining in place. The sides of the structure have largely collapsed due to erosion, leaving the north side as the best preserved. The stairway has not been positively identified but is believed to be a wide sunken stairway on the east side. The broken fragments of Stela 1 were found at the base of this stairway.

The platform supported a long superstructure facing onto the West Plaza, as evidenced by the bases of its walls. Originally the superstructure consisted of a single, long room but this was later subdivided; another room to the south was probably demolished at the same time. The floor of the superstructure is 11.5 metres (38 ft) above the level of the West Plaza. The walls were 1.1 metres (3.6 ft) thick and the entrance doorway measured 2.5 metres (8.2 ft) wide. This superstructure was divided into five rooms, each measuring 2.9 by 0.5 metres (9.5 by 1.6 ft). These rooms were completely sealed, and in some cases destroyed, by a layer of compact white soil during the Terminal Classic. The rooms were upon a low platform upon the summit and were accessed from the upper section of the basal platform via three steps measuring 22 metres (72 ft) wide, with a tread of 0.25 metres (0.82 ft) and a height of 0.3 metres (0.98 ft). Stucco fragments with traces of pigment indicate that the rooms were once painted.

Room 1 was extremely poorly preserved and is the southernmost of the rooms. Only one doorjamb and a portion of wall belonging to a rear bench were found during excavations.

Room 2 is one of the best preserved of the rooms atop Structure 4. It measured 2.9 metres (9.5 ft) north-south by 0.5 metres (1.6 ft) east-west. The doorway to the room was 1.8 metres (5.9 ft) wide. The room has been dated to the Terminal Classic.

Room 3 is the middle room of the superstructure. It was the only room not to have been sealed during the Terminal Classic and due to this is in a poor state of preservation. The room possessed a bench against the back wall the measured 0.2 metres (0.66 ft) in height and 1 metre (3.3 ft) wide.

Room 4 was well preserved and is very similar to Room 5. It measured 2.9 metres (9.5 ft) north-south by 0.5 metres (1.6 ft) east-west, the door was 1.8 metres (5.9 ft) wide. The bench of the room measured 0.6 metres (2.0 ft) high by 1 metre (3.3 ft) thick.

Room 5 is of identical proportions as rooms 2 and 4. It was extremely well preserved, including the rear wall of the bench and the room was used as a model for investigations of the other rooms in Structure 4.

Some artefacts were recovered from the northeastern portion of the structure. They included fragments of a metate and of a manos (handstone for use with a metate) and a large quantity of domestic ceramics. Stela 1 and Altar 7 were found in front of Structure 4.

===== Ballcourt =====
The Ballcourt is on the north side of the West Plaza. It runs north-south and measures 18 metres (59 ft) long by 4.8 metres (16 ft) wide. The sides of the ballcourt measure approximately 4 metres (13 ft) high. These side structures supported rectangular stone benches. The west structure has been damaged by a looters' trench and originally had a stairway that climbed the west side. Sculpted blocks of stone were found on the benches of both side structures and once decorated the aprons of the ballcourt. The four surviving blocks bear geometric designs and parts of sculpted figures deity masks. The stucco floor at the south end of the ballcourt was found to be well preserved. The ballcourt has been dated to the Late Classic Period.

==== Northeast Plaza ====
The Northeast Plaza covers an area of 850 square metres (9,100 sq ft). It is located to the north of the East Plaza. The Northeast Plaza is enclosed by four structures of similar size and form and was accessed from the northeast corner. The tallest structure measures 5 metres (16 ft) high. The four buildings completely enclose an area measuring 30 by 35 metres (98 by 115 ft). These four structures consist of stepped rectangular platforms and were built from finely dressed limestone blocks. Excavations revealed remains of the superstructure of the tallest structure, including rooms with different entrance doorways. Construction at the plaza dates to the Late Classic period.

Northeast Plaza Structure 2 has a rectangular base. The structure is believed to have had three stepped levels that were built with finely dressed stone blocks, some of which were decorated with a double-trapezoid design. Some of the blocks were found to have a thin coating of cream-coloured stucco. The rear of the structure has the form of a truncated pyramid. The stairway and the upper parts of the structure were deliberately destroyed in antiquity, leaving only the lower courses of stonework in place. The southeastern portion of the platform is the best preserved, where a talud wall stands to a height of 1.5 metres (4.9 ft). Structure 2 is believed to have faced onto the Northeast Plaza. Ceramic remains were found on the east side of the platform and also where Structure 2 joins Structure 4. Excavations of the upper platform revealed five layers of stucco flooring, all dating to the Late Classic. Burial 67 was found deposited in a cist under the second layer, its location had been marked on that floor with a painted red circle. Upon the top of the platform were found traces of a small (0.5-metre (1.6 ft) wide) room with doorways facing the east and west. The walls were 1.35 metres (4.4 ft) thick and their remains stand to a height of 35 centimetres (14 in). The floor of the room slopes noticeably down to the east.

==== Northwest Plaza ====
The Northwest Plaza covers an area of 3,600 square metres (39,000 sq ft). It is enclosed by two structures, the largest of which is a pyramid on the west side. No monuments were found within the Northwest Plaza. The plaza occupies a privileged position at the centre of the city although it does not have a high concentration of structures. Three construction levels have been identified within the Northwest Plaza, all of them date to the Late Classic.

Northwest Plaza Structure 1 has a rectangular base measuring 44 metres (144 ft) east-west by 25 metres (82 ft) north-south and standing 2.5 metres (8.2 ft) high. The lowest level of the platform body has an inclining talud wall. A 15-metre (49 ft) wide stairway projects 2 metres (6.6 ft) from the wall of the structure. The stairways was built during the earliest construction phase of the plaza, rising from the lowest plaza level. After the second surfacing of the plaza an unusual inclining talud-style dado was added to the stairway. At the same time a small bench-type structure was attached to the west side of the platform in order to widen the lower level of the building. The small blocks used in this extension contrast with the large, finely dressed blocks used in the main structure. Potsherds recovered from the structure mainly represent Late to Terminal Classic utilitarian wares, with additional fragments representing a Postclassic occupation of the structure.

Northwest Plaza Structure 2 is a 5.5-metre (18 ft) high pyramid on the west side of the plaza. Its base measures 30 by 24 metres (98 by 79 ft). The architectural quality of the pyramid was poor, as demonstrated by the small, irregular blocks used in construction, and it has been badly damaged by the collapse of its sides. These blocks average 10 centimetres (3.9 in) on each side. The pyramid has also been damaged by a looters' pit on the west side of the structure. Architectural detail has been largely obliterated by the pyramid's poor state of preservation, but inset corners have been identified on the north and south sides. Surface ceramic finds all date to the Terminal Classic. Artefacts recovered include portions of a ceramic incense burner and broken obsidian prismatic blades.

==== Southeast Plaza ====
Southeast Plaza Structure 1 is a rectangular platform with at least two levels. It has been dated to the Late Classic Period.

==== Groups 13 and 15 ====
Group 13 and Group 15 are located just outside the protected archaeological zone, opposite the custodian's house. Group 15 is situated immediately north of Group 13 and some structures are shared by both groups. Ceramic fragments recovered from the two groups have been dated to the Late Preclassic, Late Classic, Terminal Classic and Postclassic, with the majority dating to the Terminal Classic.

Group 15 Structure 2 is a rectangular platform with a projecting stairway. It measures 18 by 7.2 metres (59 by 24 ft) with a projecting stairway that measures 9 by 1.2 metres (29.5 by 3.9 ft). A few domestic ceramics were recovered during excavations.

Group 15 Structure 5 was found to have a midden near the northwest corner from which were excavated a large amount of Terminal Classic potsherds together with a few pieces dating to the Postclassic Period.

==== Group 18 ====
This group is a residential group to the northeast of the site core. Four low structures were built upon a basal platform, largely clustered on the east side. The plaza area had an area of 300 square metres (3,200 sq ft). The plaza had two construction phases, the earliest dating to the Late Preclassic Period and the second to the Late Classic. Burial 68 was found in the centre of the plaza, under the earlier floor level.

Group 18 Structure 1 is on the north side of the plaza. It was severely damaged when a modern street was laid out, cutting through its north side. Only the south wall remains.

Group 18 Structure 2 is on the east side of the plaza. Its earliest phase dates to the Late Preclassic. The Preclassic remains consist of a low north wall running east-west. A later construction phase was built over this. It consisted of a rectangular platform that supported a bench. A small pyrite disc was found near the front wall. Obsidian prismatic blades were found on top of the platform, together with pieces of a thin earthenware bowl. Burial 69 was found in front of the base of the platform.

Group 18 Structure 3 is a rectangular platform located on the south side of the plaza. The core consists of large pieces of rubble that suggest some kind of older substructure. The platform has been dated to the Late Classic.

Group 18 Structure 4 is situated on the west side of the plaza.

==== Group 21 ====
This group is located to the north of the reservoir. The layout of the group is difficult to discern due to destruction caused by the construction of a street, although two low structures survive. Group 21 is distinguished by being the only group outside of the ceremonial centre of the city to possess stone monuments, the badly eroded Stela 10 and Altar 6.

==== Other structures ====
The various minor residential groups, including Groups 7 through to 12, were formed by clusters of very small structures with platforms not exceeding 1 metre (3.3 ft) in height. Groups 4 to 6, 13 to 17, 20 to 24, 26 and 52 all date to the Late and Terminal Classic. Late Preclassic ceramics were recovered from Group 23.

=== Municipal Sector and E-Group ===
The Municipal Sector is the area north of the highway running from Flores to Dolores. Part of this sector actually falls within the municipality of Santa Ana. Eighteen residential groups have been mapped in this sector. These residential groups are clustered around a group of larger structures forming an E-Group ceremonial complex, located 2 kilometres (1.2 mi) from the site core.

The E-Group consists of a number of structures around a small plaza. These include a pyramid at the west side, a long structure on the east side supporting an upper platform and two smaller structures on the north and south sides. The E-Group was first built in the Late Preclassic Period, it was lightly occupied during the Early Classic and was then expanded with the addition of two structures in the Late Classic. By this time major activity at El Chal had been transferred to the area around the acropolis, leaving the once central E-Group on the periphery.

The East Platform of the E-Group has produced ceramics dating to the Late Preclassic, Early Classic and Late Classic. The East Platform was built from limestone blocks and was accessed via a stairway at the rear of the building that projected 6 metres (20 ft). This stairway climbed a 9-metre (30 ft) wide projection from the rear of the building. The east platform does not support the usual lateral structures found at E-Groups, with the Central Platform being the only upper platform upon the basal platform.

The Central Platform of the E-Group is situated upon the middle section of the East Platform. It has produced ceramics dated to the Late Preclassic. The platform has a total height of 8 metres (26 ft).

The West Pyramid of the E-Group produced ceramic evidence dating the Late Preclassic, Early Classic and Late Classic. Although the limestone blocks used for its construction are very poorly preserved, the West Pyramid is believed to have been a radial pyramid dating to the Late Preclassic Period.

The North Structure of the E-Group has not been securely dated but is believed to date to the Late Classic, based on comparisons with E-Groups at other Maya cities.

The South Structure of the E-Group has not been securely dated but is also believed to have been built in the Late Classic.

=== Arrepentimiento Sector ===
The Arrepentimiento Sector is located beside the highway running from El Chal to Santa Elena. It contains about 40 groups of structures concentrated upon karstic hills, with lesser occupation in low-lying areas. Settlement extends northwards from the highway for about 600 metres (2,000 ft) until the dry riverbed of the Río El Chal. The majority of the architectural groups are located among cattle pasture. Some of the groups have been heavily looted, mostly those groups covered by dense vegetation. Those groups in open pasture have not been subject to looting but have suffered from the stripping of their stonework in order to use it in modern construction.

The architectural groups of the Arrepentimiento Sector are residential in nature, with low platforms measuring between 10 and 40 centimetres (3.9 and 15.7 in) high laid out around patios with alignments of uncut stones. The structures in these groups date to the Late Classic.

The North Mound of Group 1 and the South Mound of Group 2 are the only structures that are greater than 1 metre (3.3 ft) in height.

=== Panorama Sector ===
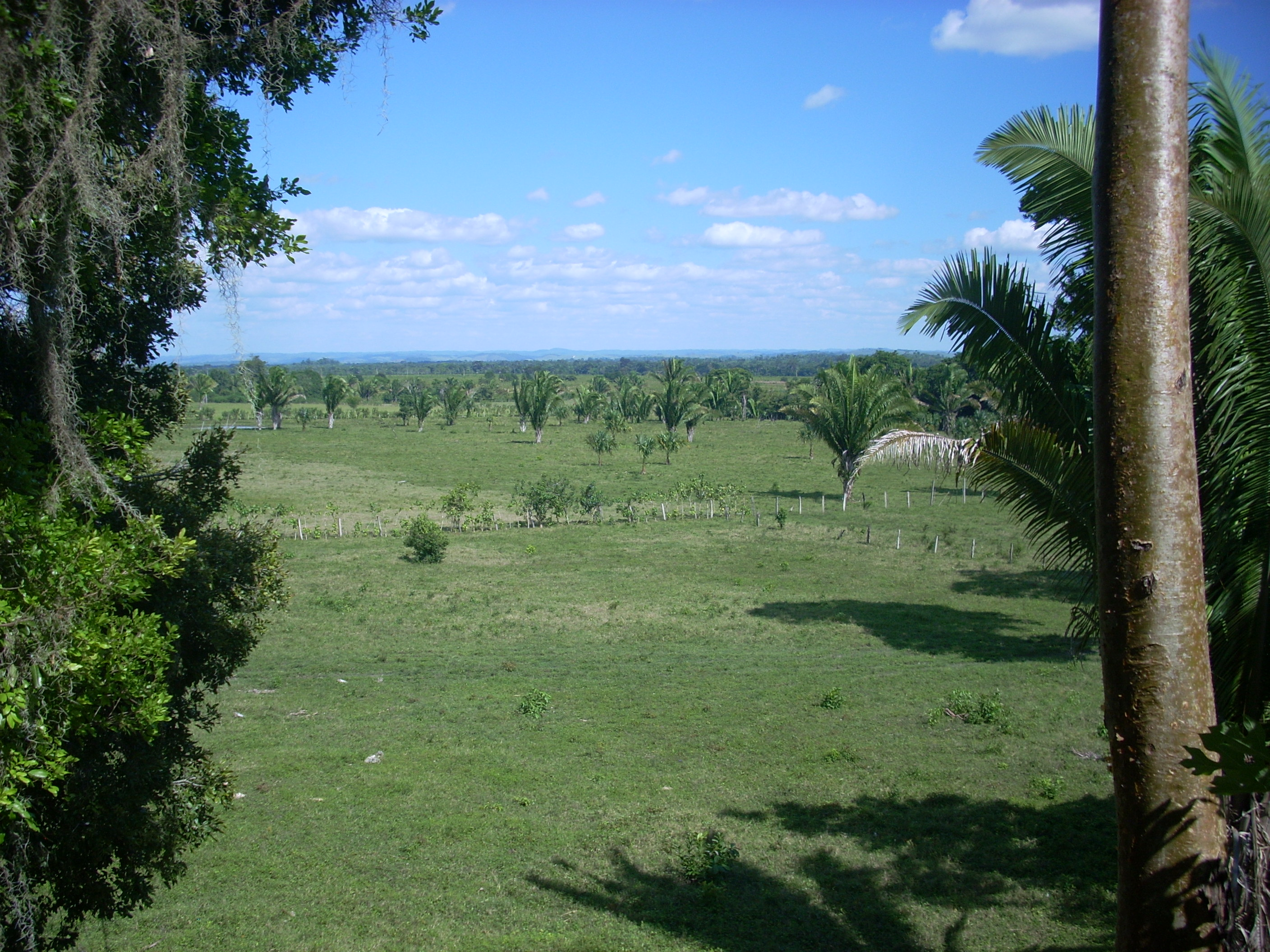
Petén savanna used for cattle ranching, similar to the terrain of Panorama Sector

This sector is located within the lands owned by Finca Panorama, some 3 kilometres (1.9 mi) from El Chal along the highway towards Santa Elena. The altitude is very close to that of the site core, averaging 270 metres (890 ft) above mean sea level. Panorama Sector occupies an area of cattle pasture with very few trees but a great many Corozo Palms, the fruit of which is used locally to produce vegetable oil. The northern part of the sector possesses a number of hills upon which residential groups were built, while towards the south the land descends towards an area of unoccupied seasonal swamps. Panorama Sector possesses 53 architectural groups, 34 of which are in the periphery, together with a causeway.

Of the ceramic fragments recovered from Panorama Sector, 374 pieces have been dated to the Late Classic, representing 62% of the total ceramics found in the sector. The vast majority of these are domestic in nature. 234 pieces were dated to the Terminal Classic, representing the remaining 38%.

Group 4 is located 80 metres (260 ft) west of Group 1. It consists of three structures arranged around a courtyard that is open on the south side. Structure 1 is the largest structure in the group. Structures 2 and 3 have been looted. The group has been dated to the Late Classic Period.

Group 5 is 500 metres (1,600 ft) southwest of Group 1. It consists of three structures laid out around a patio that is open of the east side. Group 5 is dated to the Late Classic.

Group 6 is 30 metres (98 ft) south of Group 1. Like Group 5 it consists of three structures laid out around a courtyard that is open on the east side. Group 6 is dated to the Late Classic.

Group 7 is located on a hillside to the east of Group 15. It consists of five structures completely enclosing a patio. Structure 1, on the north side, and Structure 5, on the west side, are the largest structures in the group. Structures 1, 2 and 3 have all been looted. Group 7 dates to the Late Classic Period.

Group 9 is 20 metres (66 ft) south of Group 7. It consists of 5 structures, four of them are small while the west structure is larger. This group is dated to the Late Classic.

Group 10 is on a hillside to the southeast of Group 9. It consists of four structures forming an enclosed patio group and dates to the Late Classic.

Group 15A is located on an artificial platform formed by levelling a natural elevation. The group is formed of six structures, four of these are large and enclose a patio. Two smaller structures are located to the southeast and southwest. The group has been looted, recovered ceramics date to the Late and Terminal Classic.

Group 15B is situated on the south side of the same artificial platform that supports Groups 15A and 15C.

Group 15C is situated at the south end of the same artificial platform that supports Group 15A. It is composed of three structures arranged around a patio that is open on the north side. Group 15C has been dated to the Late Classic.

Group 16 has not been excavated but is notable for a 70-metre (230 ft) long causeway running north-south past its plaza. The causeway is 9 metres (30 ft) wide and bordered by 20-centimetre (7.9 in) high parapets. The original length of the causeway has not been determined. The plaza itself is bordered by the remains of walls that stand 15 to 20 centimetres (5.9 to 7.9 in) high.

Group 19 consists of three structures laid out around a patio that is open on the south side. The group has been tentatively identified as a stone workshop due to the great quantity of waste product found there, and it may have produced flint cores. Group 19 has been dated to the Terminal Classic. Stela 19 and Altar 9 were found 40 metres (130 ft) east of Group 9. They are the only monuments that have been found in Panorama Sector.

=== Monuments ===
Nineteen carved stone monuments were originally found at El Chal, all of which are badly eroded. Various monuments are broken into fragments. Only five stelae and three altars bore sculpted designs. The stelae exhibit a variety of forms but all the altars are circular. None of the hieroglyphic texts found on the monuments of El Chal have yet been deciphered. The sculptural style of the monuments is similar to that of 8th century monuments from Sacul, Ucanal and Naranjo.

Stela 1 was found at the west side the West Plaza, at the base of Structure 4. It was associated with Altar 7. The stela is broken into various fragments and was sculpted with a rectangular frame containing the portrait of a standing person with an elaborate feathered headdress, holding a staff in his right hand. The figure is accompanied by a vertical hieroglyphic panel containing a calendrical date. The text is badly eroded but the numbers 10 and 13 can be read. The stela was resting upon the last construction phase of the plaza. Stela 1 measured 1.75 metres (5.7 ft) high by 1.5 metres (4.9 ft) wide and was 0.35 metres (1.1 ft) thick. The best preserved fragment, that possessing the sculpted portrait, was moved to the Museo Regional del Sureste de Petén ("Southeastern Petén Regional Museum") in Dolores in 2005. This fragment measured 1.75 metres (5.7 ft) high by 0.66 metres (2.2 ft) wide and was 0.35 metres (1.1 ft) thick. Five stela fragments were left where they had fallen, they contained parts of the frame and of the feathered headdress. The central pieces of the stela were not found during the excavations that took place in 2004 and 2005.

Stela 2 was found in centre of the West Plaza. The butt of this stela was found in its original location, although the shaft has broken and fallen backwards. Stela 2 does not appear to have had any sculpted designs or text. It was associated with Altar 1.

Stela 3 was found in the West Plaza. Stela 3 was originally erected at the base of Structure 3. It was sculpted with a rounded frame containing the figure of a person facing left and accompanied by a badly eroded and completely illegible hieroglyphic text. Stela 3 had been moved from its original location and was associated with Altar 2.

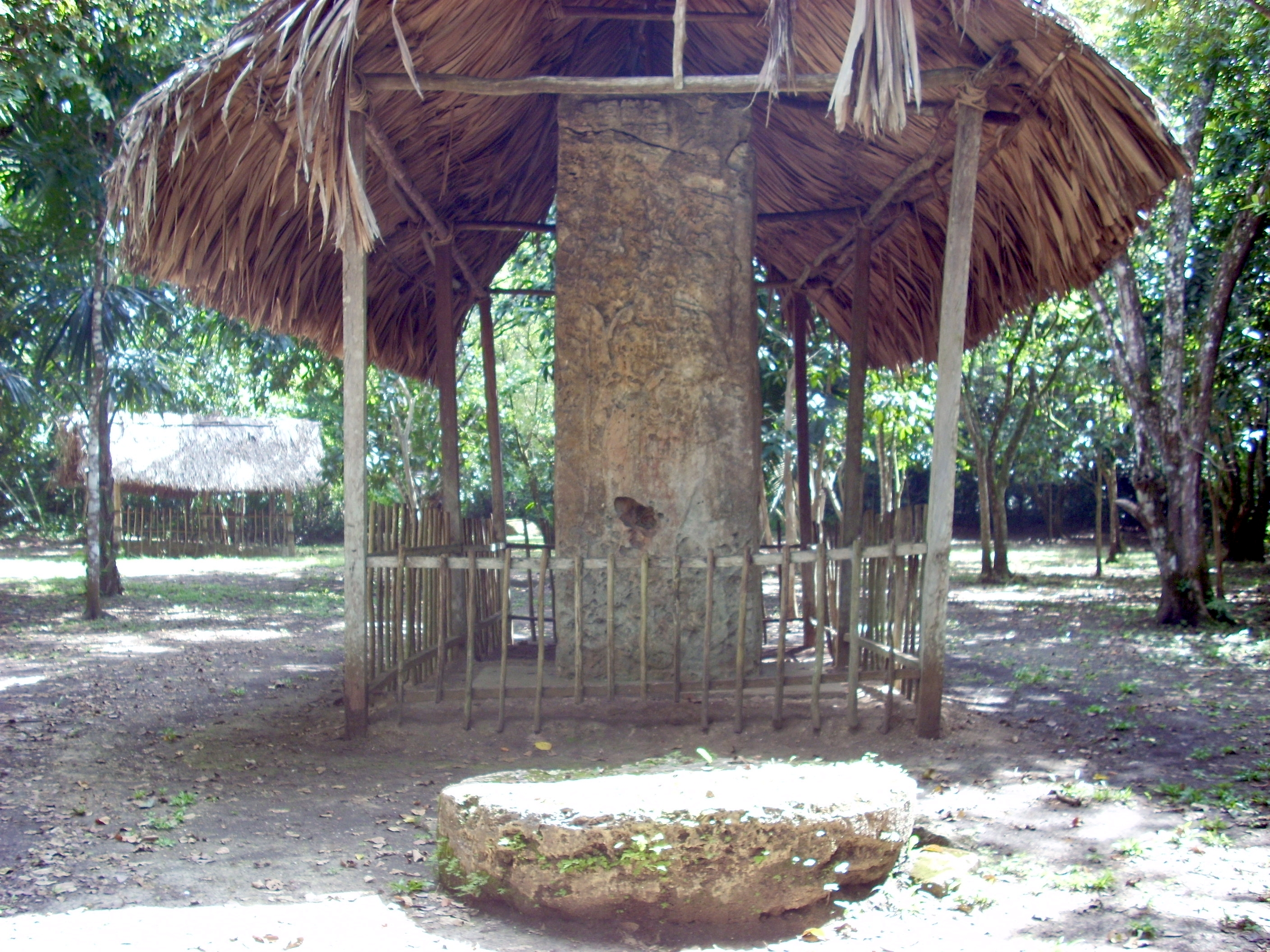
Stela 4, front, showing a king standing upon three war captives. Altar 3 is in the foreground.

Stela 4 was found in the northern part of the East Plaza. It was the only monument at El Chal to have been sculpted on both sides and had been moved from its original location. Due to its sculptural style and its location, it is believed to have been associated with Altars 3 and 4. The upper portion of the front of the stela bears a hieroglyphic text with a calendrical date that has been interpreted as 9.16.10.0.0. 1 Ahau 3 Zip (17 March 761) together with the site's Emblem Glyph. This side of the stela depicts a Maya bloodletting ritual with a richly dressed person standing with legs apart standing on top of three sitting prisoners, the middle of which bears his own name written upon his left leg. The principal figure bears a spear topped by a serpent head with a flint spearhead emerging from it. This spear is very similar in style to one depicted on Stela 8 at Naranjo. The reverse of the stela depicts three individuals standing upon a monster mask seen in profile. A child or youth is seated before two adult figures. All of them wear rectangular headdresses and hold something in their hands that cannot now be distinguished. Hieroglyphic texts are carved above the heads of the two standing figures and probably represent their names. The sculptural style of the two sides is different, and the foot-level of the standing figures on each side is different, with the figures on the reverse being positioned higher up the shaft than the figure on the front. This probably indicates that both sides were sculpted in situ at different times, with the reverse of the stela being crafted after the floor level of the plaza had risen to cover the base of the front side.

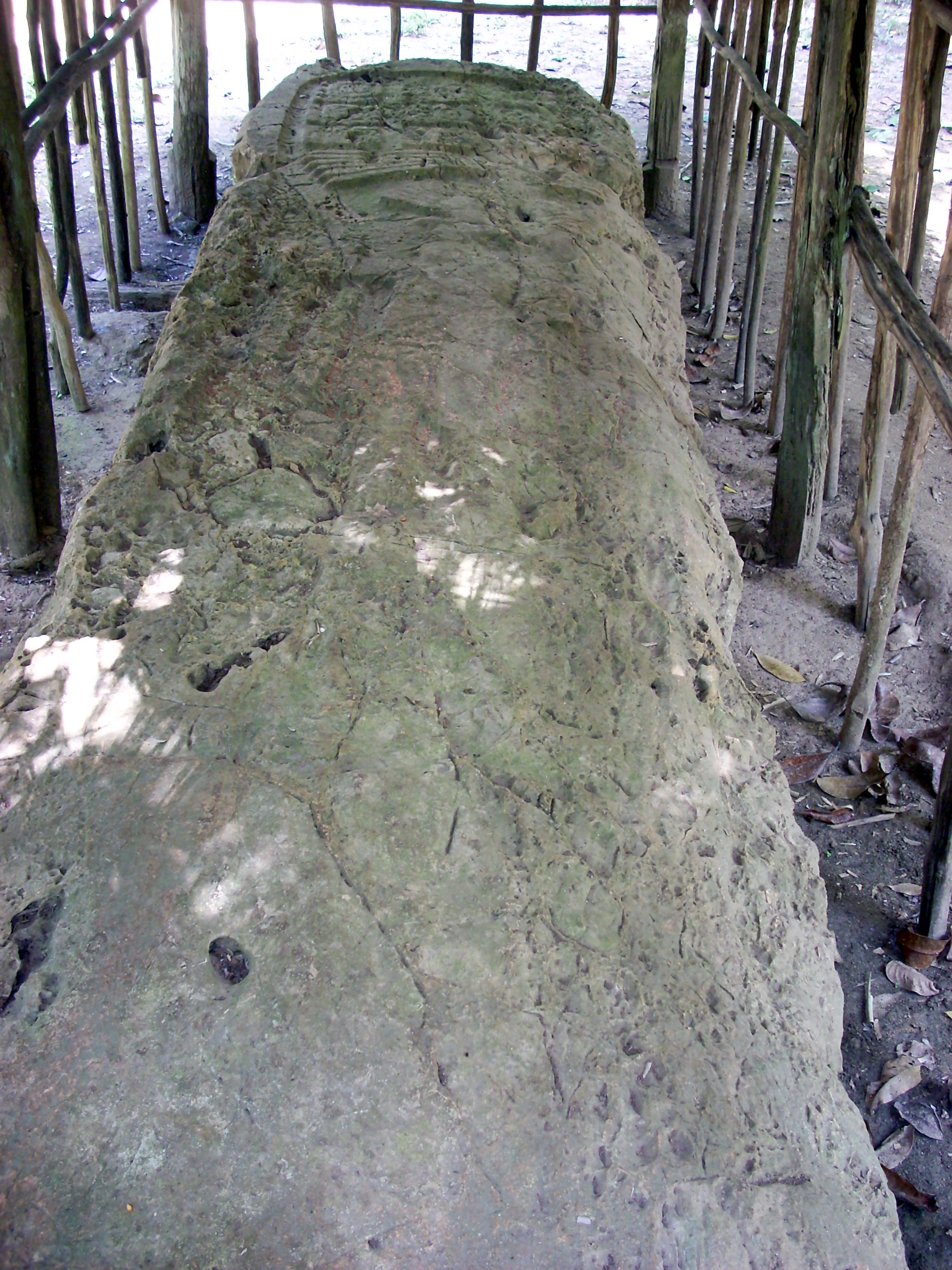
Stela 5

Stela 5 was situated at the base of Structure 1 in the East Plaza. It was carved with a rounded frame containing a figure in profile facing to the left. The figure is standing with the legs together and is wearing a feathered headdress and bears a zoomorphic head on its back, from which hang more feathers. The hands of the figure are extended forward and appear to bear a staff of rulership. The stela bears a hieroglyphic panel with an incomplete dedicatory date that must fall within the range from December 740 to November 805. The text also contains the name of the king who dedicated the stela, Shield Jaguar, and the Emblem Glyph of El Chal.

Stela 6, Stela 7, Stela 8 and Stela 9 are all either fragments or butts of stelae that were removed in the 1970s by FYDEP and are now lost. All of these stelae fragments are situated in the southern half of the East Plaza, with Stela 6 to the east and Stela 9 to the west.

Stela 6 is broken into multiple pieces that are scattered at the base of East Plaza Structure 2. It was a plain limestone monument.

Stela 10 was found in Group 21 together with Altar 6. They are among the very few monuments that were placed outside of the ceremonial centre of the city. Stela 10 was carved with a frame containing a figure, now badly eroded. The figure is standing with feet separated and turned outwards. Small hieroglyphic panels accompany it. Stela 10 had been moved from its original location, which was probably somewhere nearby.

Stela 11 was found at the base of one of the structures in the Southeast Plaza, it was a plain monument. Stela 11 has fallen and is lying on its back.

Stela 12 was found with Altar 9 some 40 metres (130 ft) east of Group 19 and 350 metres (1,150 ft) south of the highway to Flores, in Panorama Sector. They are the only monuments to have been found in Panorama Sector. Stela 12 is a plain monument sculpted from limestone. It has fallen from its upright position and is half buried. It is broken in the middle and measures 2 metres (6.6 ft) long by 0.8 metres (2.6 ft) wide by 0.3 metres (0.98 ft) thick.

Altar 1 was found in centre of the West Plaza, together with Stela 2. This altar was found in its original location. It was a plain monument.

Altar 2 was found in the West Plaza, where it was associated with Stela 3 at the base of Structure 3. Altar 2 was a plain monument and had been moved from its original location.

Altar 3 was found in the northern part of the East Plaza, where it was associated with Stela 4. It was sculpted although it is now badly eroded. It bears the images of two seated anthropomorphic figures but further details cannot be distinguished.

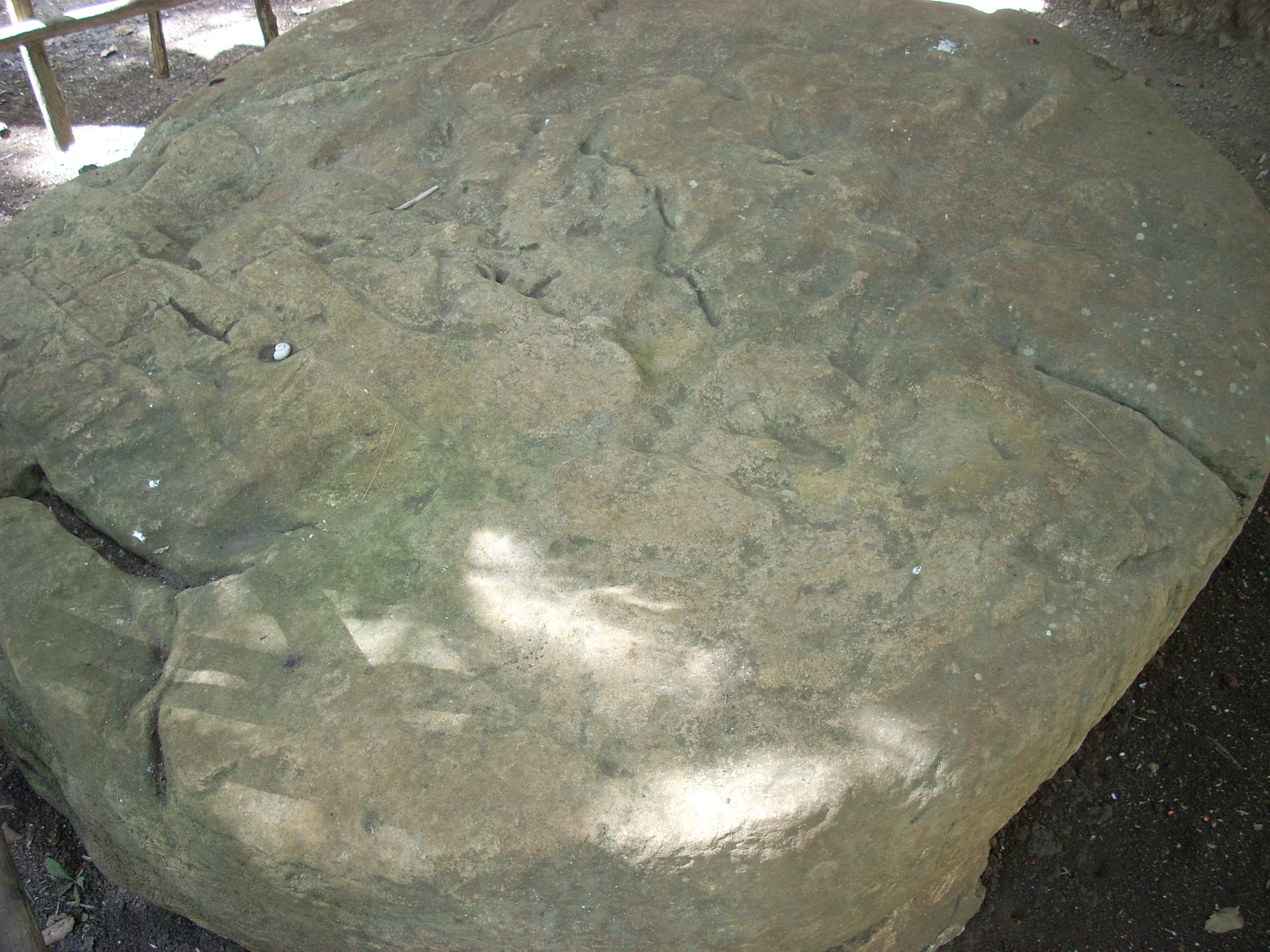
The badly eroded Altar 4

Altar 4 is a circular monument. It was also found in the northern part of the East Plaza and was associated with Stela 4. It depicts three seated prisoners, the central figure is facing to the left while the other two are facing inwards towards him. Hieroglyphic texts are carved underneath the prisoners and upon the sides of the altar. The altar has been dated on stylistic grounds to the latter part of the 8th century AD.

Altar 5 was found in the East Plaza. It has been broken into various pieces and is badly eroded but is believed to have been sculpted with a scene similar to that represented on Altar 4.

Altar 6 is a plain monument that was found in Group 21 together with Stela 10. Like its associated stela it had been moved from its original location in antiquity but was probably not moved far.

Altar 7 was found in the West Plaza at the base of Structure 4 together with Stela 1. The altar is plain, without sculpted figures or text and rests upon the last construction phase of the plaza. It was circular and measured 1.5 metres (4.9 ft) in diameter and was 0.5 metres (1.6 ft) high. It is broken in three parts.

Altar 8 was found in its original location in the Southeast Plaza. It was a plain altar without signs of being sculpted. The monument is badly cracked.

Altar 9 was found with Stela 12 in Panorama Sector, near Group 19. It is located 10 centimetres (3.9 in) from one end of Stela 12 and is also a plain monument. It is a circular altar, broken in fragments and half buried. It measures 60 centimetres (24 in) in diameter and 45 centimetres (18 in) thick. Only the upper 20 centimetres (7.9 in) are exposed.

Altar 11 was found in its original location.

Altar 19 was found in its original location.

=== Burials ===
Burial 67 was found in a cist under the second of five stucco floor levels in Northeast Plaza Structure 2. The skeleton was lying on its back with the head towards the north. The remains were poorly preserved but belonged to an adult. Of the skull only some dental remains were found. A ceramic plate had been placed under the head of the deceased and another plate was placed upon the knees. The plate was painted with four seated anthropomorphic figures with inclined head and wearing leather gloves with jaguar claws. The facial features of the figures are unusual. The bottom of the plate bears the image of a dancer. The ceramics date the burial to the Late Classic.

Burial 68 was found in the centre of the Group 18 plaza. The corpse was poorly preserved, it was laid out on its back with the skull towards the north. The remains were covered with small pieces of limestone mixed with brown soil. A piece of the upper jaw indicated that the remains were those of a child aged between 5 and 10 years old. Four ceramic pieces were deposited as an offering; two plates, an earthenware bowl and a bowl. Burial 68 is dated to the Late Preclassic.

Burial 69 was found in front of the base of Group 18 Structure 2. The remains were extremely poorly preserved but the deceased may have been laid out on their back with the head towards the north. Associated funerary offerings included a tripod plate, a polychrome vase and a flint projectile point. The burial was securely dated to the Late Classic.

Burial 264 was found in a cist under the earliest level of the stucco flooring of Terrace 2 Structure 2, a pyramid on the acropolis. The cist was built from stone slabs and measured 0.7 by 0.6 metres (2.3 by 2.0 ft) by 1.4 metres (4.6 ft). The human remains consist of some skull fragments and some pieces of the longbones, with the skull at the east end. The offering consisted of a ceramic pot with lid dated to the Late Classic period.

Burial 265 was found at the base of the stairway of Terrace 1 Structure 2 in the acropolis. Ceramics associated with the burial have been dated to the Middle Preclassic Period. This burial is the only evidence yet found of such early activity at the site. It consists of the burial of a seated infant together with a newborn. The burial was laid out upon a layer of large stones and was accompanied by a plate and other ceramics as a funerary offering. The child's skull was found underneath the plate itself. Burnt stones and earth were found next to the burial.

Burial 278 was that of an infant, deposited in a cist under the floor of Terrace 1 Structure 5 in the acropolis. It was unaccompanied by any offering, the few ceramic fragments found associated with the cist were dated to the Late Classic Period. The remains were laid out on their back, with the skull oriented to the south.
