= El Chal, Guatemala =

El Chal
- Municipality
- Location of El Chal El Chal (Guatemala)
- Coordinates: 16.64°N 89.65°W
- Country: Guatemala
- Department: Petén
- Gazetted: 6 March 2014
- Seat: El Chal

Government
  - Type: Mayor–council
  - Mayor: Elías Calderón Alvarez

Area
  - Total: 957.63 km^{2} (369.74 sq mi)
- Elevation (average): 270 m (890 ft)

Population (2018 Census)
  - Total: 13,819
  - Estimate (2018): 15,095
  - Density: 14.430/km^{2} (37.375/sq mi)
  - Seat: 2,646 (2015 estimate)
- Time zone: UTC-6 (Central)
- Website: Official website

El Chal is a municipality in the Guatemalan department of Petén, located approximately 50 kilometres (31 mi) southeast of the departmental capital, Flores. Its name may derive from Itzaʼ chal, "shawl", or aj-chal ja, "clear water."

== Geography ==
El Chal is located in the southern part of the Petén Basin. It borders the municipalities of Santa Ana to the north, Dolores to the east, Poptún to the south, Sayaxché to the west, and San Francisco to the northwest. The municipality covers an area of 957.63 square kilometres (369.74 sq mi).

The terrain of El Chal is slightly uneven, becoming more rugged as it approaches the Maya Mountains in the southeast. It has been significantly deforested: as of 2015, 59% of the land is without any forest cover and only 14% is covered by the original forest. The southwestern tip of the municipality lies in the Machaquilá wildlife refuge.

El Chal lies in the watershed of the Pasión River, being drained by its tributaries such as the San Juan, Poxte and Machaquila. These rivers are permanent but non-navigable and have a low level of pollution. The largest body of water in the municipality is Lake Oquevix, which is located on the border between El Chal and Santa Ana and covers about 2.75 square kilometres (1.06 sq mi). Tilapia is farmed in the lake.

El Chal has a tropical climate with an annual average temperature of 26.6 °C (79.9 °F) and a relative humidity generally ranging from 74% to 78%. The rainy season lasts from May to October and peaks in August. Annual precipitation is 1,849 millimetres (72.8 in).

== History ==
The place name of El Chal is attested in records of the Spanish conquest of Petén. It was originally a stopping point where caravans travelling between Dolores and Flores could camp overnight. The first attempt at settling the area was made by the family of Ernesto Montejo and Felicita Cuoch in 1935, although they eventually returned to Santo Toribio near Dolores. The first permanent settlers were the family of Sebastián Cuz and Gertrudis Pop, who arrived in 1948 with their children. They also brought with them two workers named Gregorio Torres and Rodrigo Hernández, whose own families later joined them as well. In 1950s a road linking Poptún with Flores was built through El Chal, enabling more settlers to migrate into the area.

After the Guatemalan Civil War, the neighbouring communities of El Chal and El Quetzal built their first water supply between 1986 and 1987. Negotiations to bring electricity to the area began in 1989, but El Chal did not achieve electrification until 2000.

On 4 February 2014, the Congress of the Republic of Guatemala decreed the creation of El Chal from territory previously part of the municipality of Dolores. The decree was gazetted in the Diario de Centro América on 6 March 2014.

== Government ==
The following people have served as mayor of El Chal:

- Mario Humberto Aldana León, 2014–2016
- Santos Martínez Martínez, 2016–2020
- Elías Calderón Álvarez, 2020–2024

== Demographics ==
In the 2018 Guatemalan Census, which had an estimated underenumeration rate of 9.0%, El Chal recorded a total population of 13,819 inhabitants. The National Institute of Statistics subsequently estimated the population of El Chal in 2018 as 15,095.

The largest inhabited locality in the municipality is the municipal seat, also called El Chal, with an estimated population of 2646 in 2015.

Spanish is the first language of 89% of the population. The remainder speak Qʼeqchiʼ but are usually bilingual in Spanish.

Religion in El Chal is split almost evenly between Roman Catholicism (46%) and Protestantism (43%).

== Culture ==
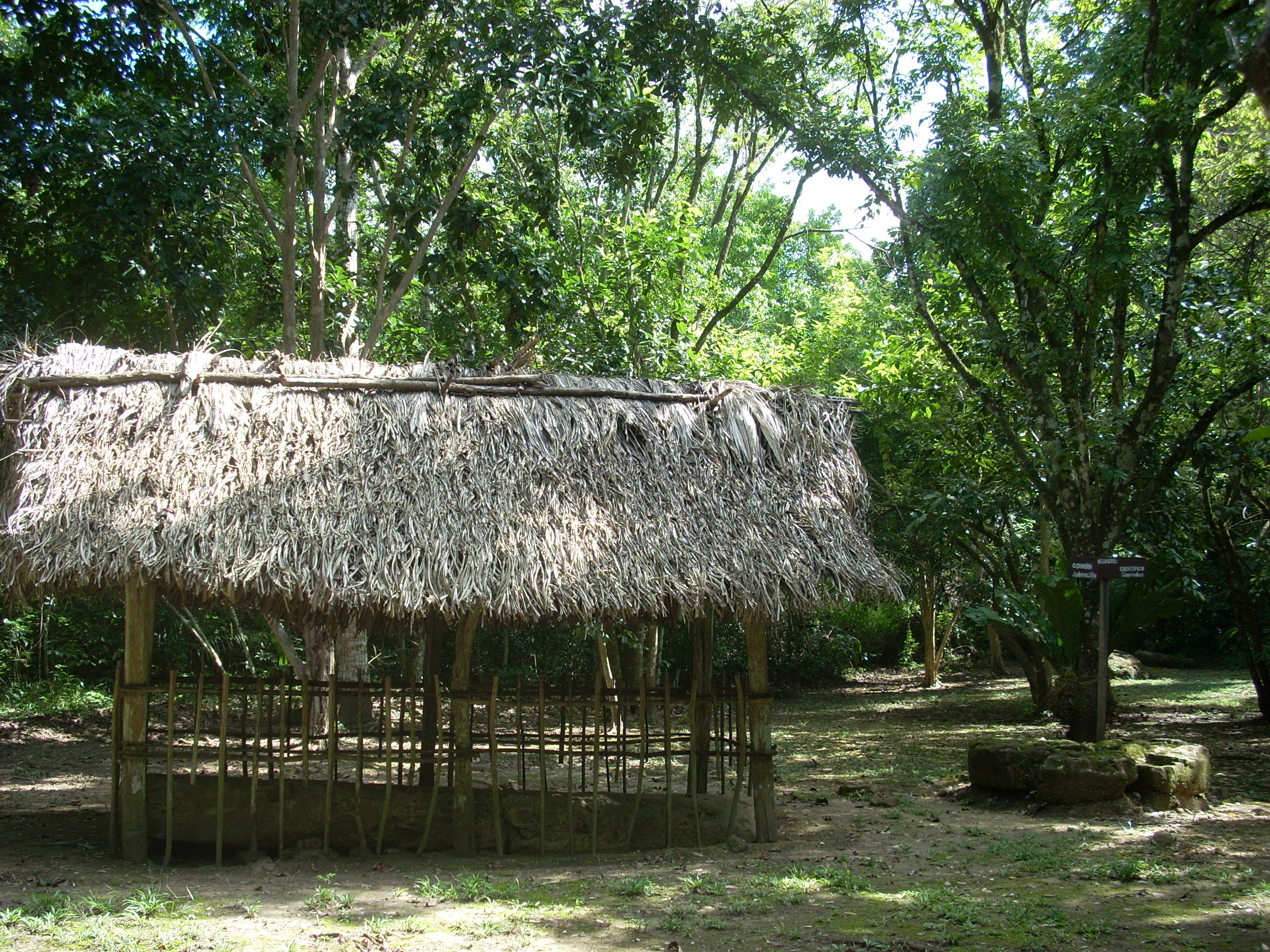
The fallen stela (Stela 5) and its associated altar at the archaeological site of El Chal.

The pre-Columbian archaeological site of El Chal has been protected since 1975 by IDAEH and is located just south of the municipal seat. The local Qʼeqchiʼ continue to hold religious ceremonies there.

The most important festival in El Chal is the feast of Saint Joseph, which has been celebrated there since 1969.

== Economy and infrastructure ==
El Chal's economy relies mainly on slash-and-burn agriculture. Two crops of maize and beans are harvested per year and pumpkin seeds are also cultivated on commercial scale. Other fruits and vegetables are grown on small scale. Cattle farming has developed rapidly in recent years, such that El Chal leads all municipalities in Petén in milk production, averaging 60,000 litres daily.

The municipal seat of El Chal lies on Central American Highway 13, the main road connection between Petén and the rest of Guatemala. Other roads in the municipality remain unpaved.
