= Centro de Restauración de Bienes Muebles =

Centro de Restauración de Bienes Muebles (CEREBIEM)
Agency overview
- Formed: 1976/1984
- Preceding agency: URPAC (1976)
- Jurisdiction: Government of Guatemala
- Headquarters: Guatemala City
- Parent agency: IDAEH

The Restoration Center for Movable Goods of Guatemala (in Spanish: Centro de Restauración de Bienes Muebles (CEREBIEM)) is a Guatemalan government agency responsible for the restoration of artefacts that belong the nation's cultural heritage. CEREBIEM was previously known as Unidad de Rescate del Patrimonio Cultural (URPAC) which was established in 1976. The center is currently a dependency of the Institute of Anthropology and History of Guatemala (IDAEH).
