= Instituto de Antropología e Historia =

National institute in Guatemala

Instituto de Antropología e Historia (IDAEH)
Agency overview
- Formed: 1946
- Jurisdiction: Government of Guatemala
- Headquarters: Guatemala City
- Parent agency: Ministry of Culture and Sports
- Child agencies: CEREBIEM; DECORBIC

The Instituto de Antropología e Historia (IDAEH, Institute of Anthropology and History) is the national institute in Guatemala responsible for the protection and maintenance of Guatemala's historical and archaeological sites, monuments, artefacts, and other aspects of the nation's cultural heritage.

IDAEH was established by governmental decree in 1946. It is currently part of the Ministry of Culture and Sports.

== Notes ==
- Valdés, Juan Antonio (2006). "Management and Conservation of Guatemala's Cultural Heritage: A Challenge to Keep History Alive". In Barbara T. Hoffman (ed.). Art and Cultural Heritage: Law, Policy And Practice. Cambridge and New York: Cambridge University Press. pp. 94–99. ISBN 978-0-521-85764-2. OCLC 60245454.
