= Maya stelae =

Carved stone slabs made by the Pre-Columbian Maya

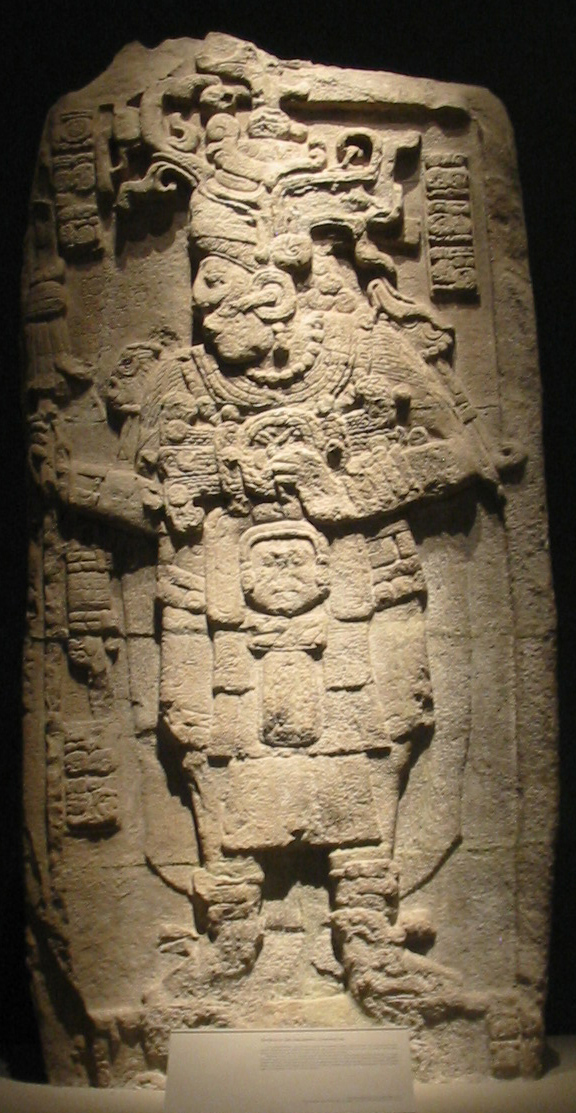
Stela 51 from Calakmul, dating to 731, is the best preserved monument from the city. It depicts the king Yuknoom Tookʼ Kʼawiil.

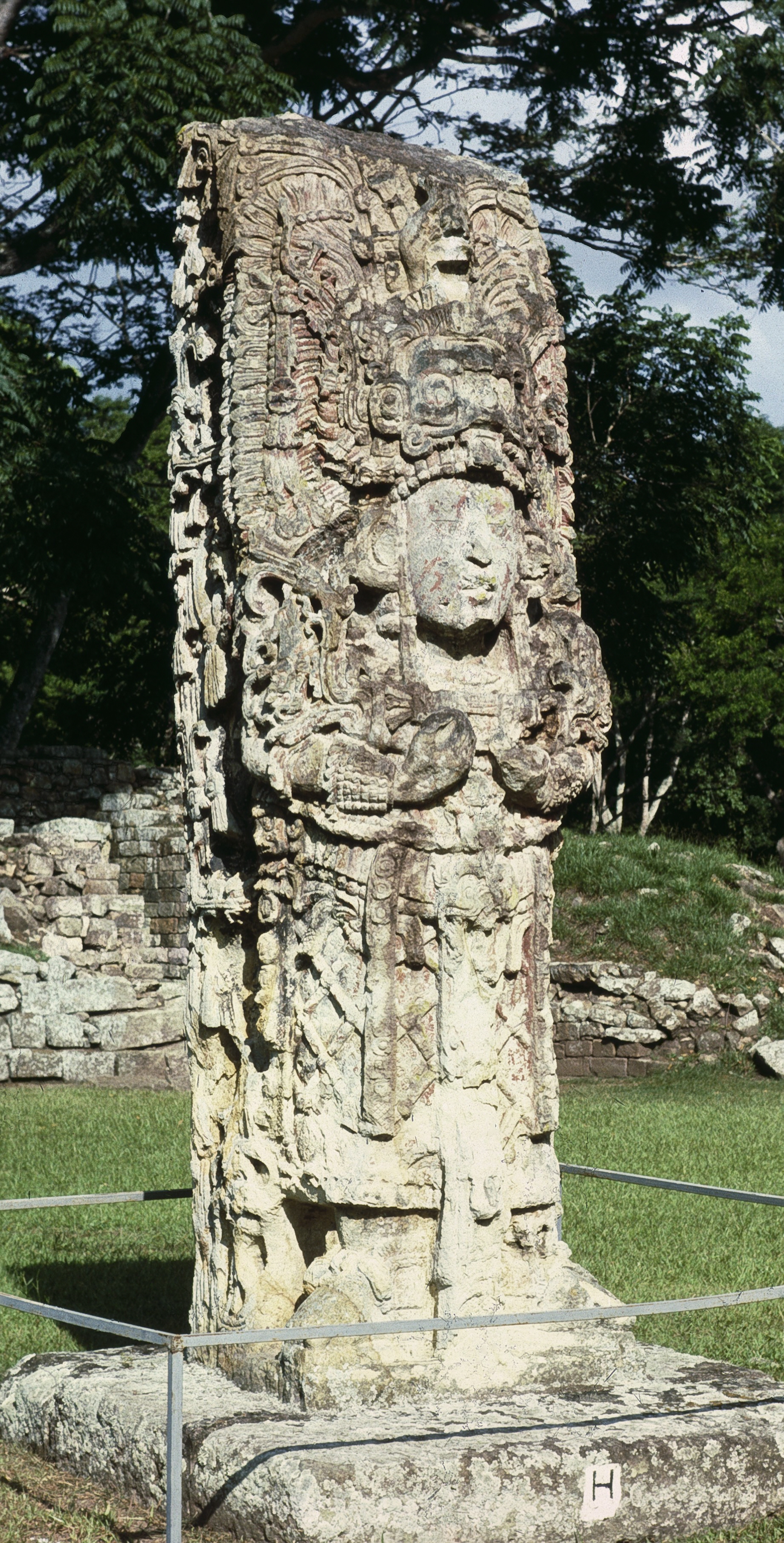
Stela H, a high-relief in-the-round sculpture from Copán in Honduras

Maya stelae (singular stela) are monuments that were fashioned by the Maya civilization of ancient Mesoamerica. They consist of tall, sculpted stone shafts and are often associated with low circular stones referred to as altars, although their actual function is uncertain. Many stelae were sculpted in low relief, although plain monuments are found throughout the Maya region. The sculpting of these monuments spread throughout the Maya area during the Classic Period (c. 250 – c. 900 AD), and these pairings of sculpted stelae and circular altars are considered a hallmark of Classic Maya civilization. The earliest dated stela to have been found in situ in the Maya lowlands was recovered from the great city of Tikal in Guatemala. During the Classic Period almost every Maya kingdom in the southern lowlands raised stelae in its ceremonial centre.

Stelae became closely associated with the concept of divine kingship and declined at the same time as this institution. The production of stelae by the Maya had its origin around 400 BC and continued through to the end of the Classic Period, around 900, although some monuments were reused in the Postclassic (c. 900–1521). The major city of Calakmul in Mexico raised the greatest number of stelae known from any Maya city, at least 166, although they are very poorly preserved.

Hundreds of stelae have been recorded in the Maya region, displaying a wide stylistic variation. Many are upright slabs of limestone sculpted on one or more faces, with available surfaces sculpted with figures carved in relief and with hieroglyphic text. Stelae in a few sites display a much more three-dimensional appearance where locally available stone permits, such as at Copán and Toniná. Plain stelae do not appear to have been painted nor overlaid with stucco decoration, but most Maya stelae were probably brightly painted in red, yellow, black, blue and other colours.

Stelae were essentially stone banners raised to glorify the king and record his deeds, although the earliest examples depict mythological scenes. Imagery developed throughout the Classic Period, with Early Classic stelae (c. 250–600) displaying non-Maya characteristics from the 4th century onwards, with the introduction of imagery linked to the central Mexican metropolis of Teotihuacan. This influence receded in the 5th century although some minor Teotihuacan references continued to be used. In the late 5th century, Maya kings began to use stelae to mark the end of calendrical cycles. In the Late Classic (c. 600–900), imagery linked to the Mesoamerican ballgame was introduced, once again displaying influence from central Mexico. By the Terminal Classic, the institution of divine kingship declined, and Maya kings began to be depicted with their subordinate lords. As the Classic Period came to an end, stelae ceased to be erected, with the last known examples being raised in 909–910.

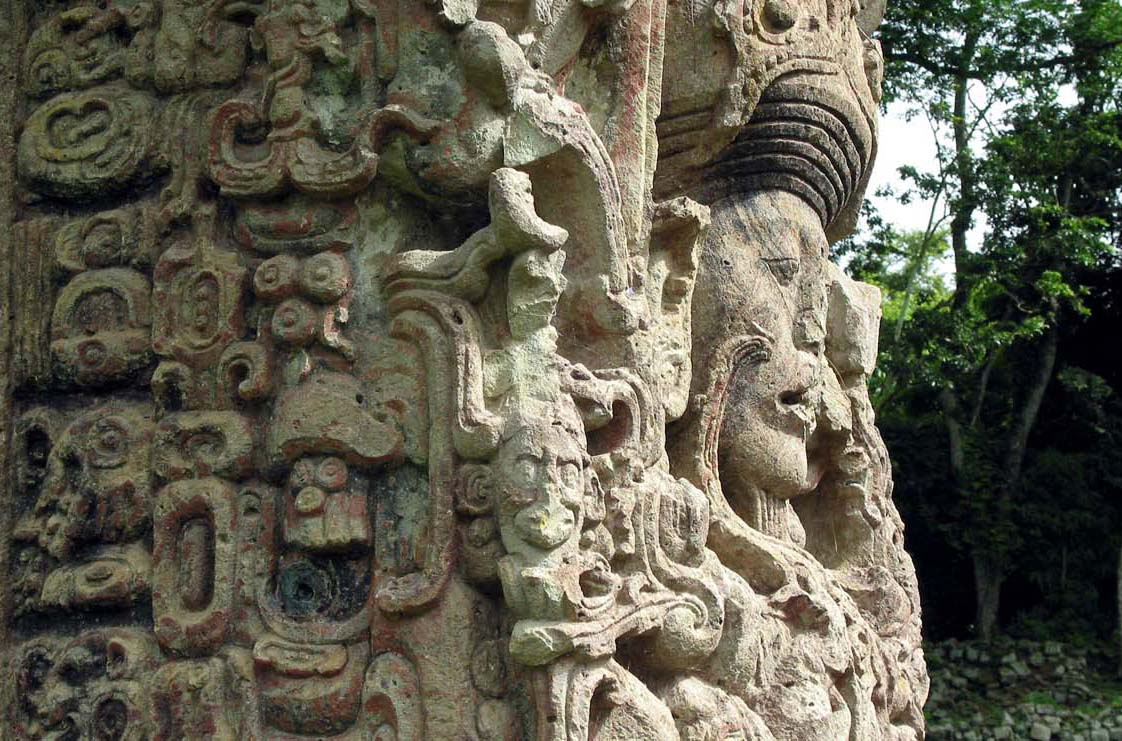
Detail of Stela B, a high relief sculpture from Copán depicting the king Uaxaclajuun Ubʼaah Kʼawiil

== Function ==
The function of the Maya stela was central to the ideology of Maya kingship from the very beginning of the Classic Period through to the very end of the Terminal Classic (800–900). The hieroglyphic inscriptions on the stelae of the Classic period site of Piedras Negras played a key part in the decipherment of the script, with stelae being grouped around seven different structures and each group appearing to chart the life of a particular individual, with key dates being celebrated, such as birth, marriage and military victories. From these stelae, epigrapher Tatiana Proskouriakoff was able to identify that they contained details of royal rulers and their associates, rather than priests and gods as had previously been theorised.

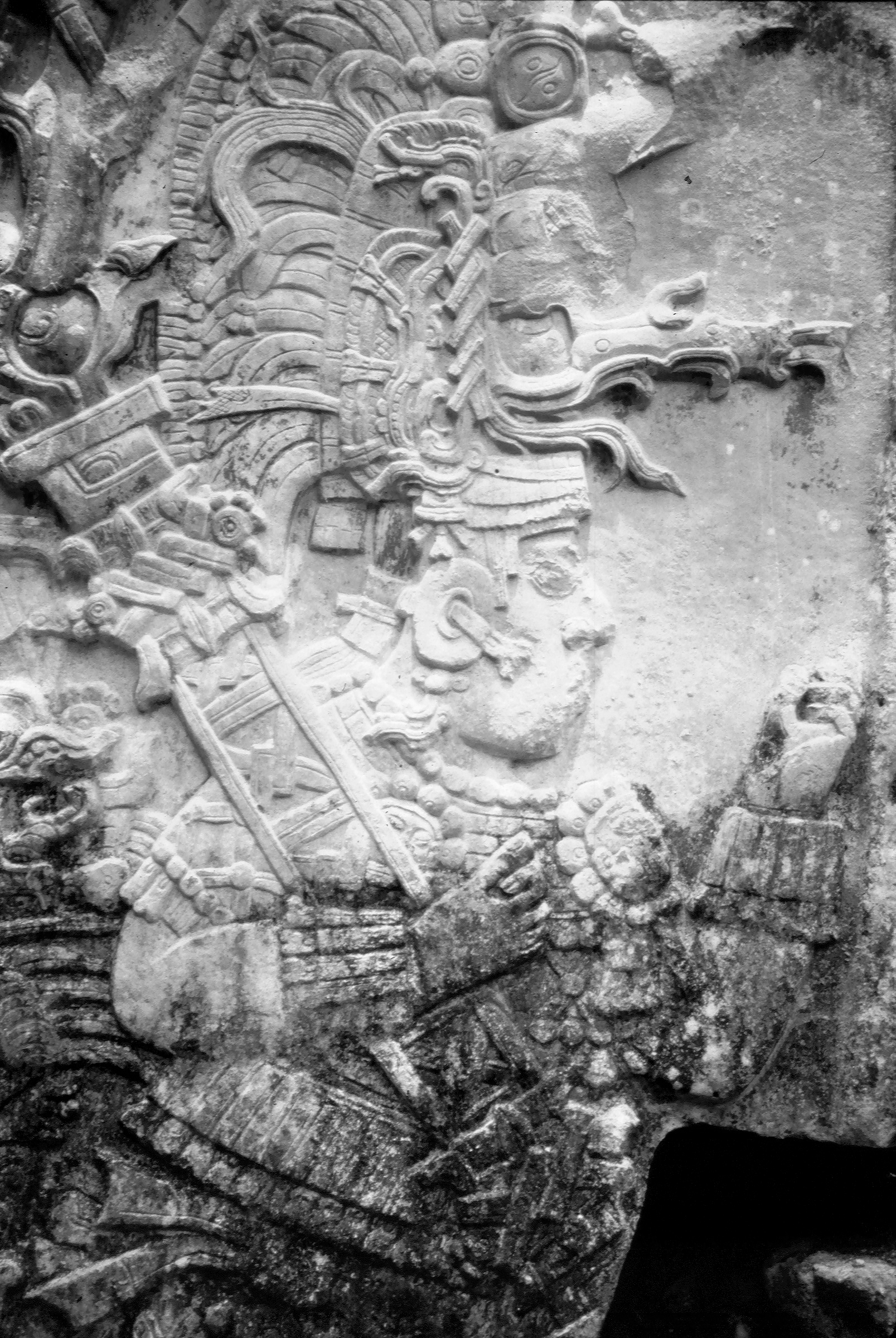
Detail of a stela from Arroyo de Piedra, later reused at Dos Pilas

Epigrapher David Stuart first proposed that the Maya regarded their stelae as te tun, "stone trees", although he later revised his reading to lakamtun, meaning "banner stone", from lakam meaning "banner" in several Mayan languages and tun meaning "stone". According to Stuart this may refer to the stelae as stone versions of vertical standards that once stood in prominent places in Maya city centres, as depicted in ancient Maya graffiti. The name of the modern Lacandon Maya is likely to be a Colonial corruption of this word.

Maya stelae were often arranged to impress the viewer, forming lines or other arrangements within the ceremonial centre of the city. Maya cities with a history of stonecarving that extended back into the Early Classic preferred to pair their stelae with a circular altar, which may have represented a cut tree trunk and have been used to perform human sacrifice, given the prevalence of sacrificial imagery on such monuments. An alternative interpretation of these "altars" is that they were in fact thrones that were used by rulers during ceremonial events. Archaeologists believe that they probably also served as ritual pedestals for incense burners, ceremonial fires and other offerings.

The core purpose of a stela was to glorify the king. Many Maya stelae depict only the king of the city, and describe his actions with hieroglyphic script. Even when the individual depicted is not the king himself, the text or scene usually relates the subject to the king. Openly declaring the importance and power of the king to the community, the stela portrayed his wealth, prestige and ancestry, and depicted him wielding the symbols of military and divine power. Stelae were raised to commemorate important events, especially at the end of a kʼatun 20-year cycle of the Maya calendar, or to mark a quarter or a half kʼatun. The stela did not just mark off a period of time; it has been argued that it physically embodied that period of time. The hieroglyphic texts on the stelae describe how some of the calendrical ceremonies required the king to perform ritual dance and bloodletting. At Tikal, the twin pyramid groups were built to celebrate the kʼatun ending and reflected Maya cosmology. These groups possessed pyramids on the east and west sides that represented the birth and death of the sun. On the south side, a nine-doored building was situated in order to represent the underworld. On the north side was a walled enclosure that represented the celestial region; it was left open to the sky. It was in this celestial enclosure that a stela-altar pair was placed, the altar being a fitting throne for the divine king. Calakmul practised a tradition that was unusual in the Maya area, that of raising twin stelae depicting both the king and his wife.

The iconography of stelae remained reasonably stable during the Classic Period, since the effectiveness of the propaganda message of the monument relied upon its symbolism being clearly recognisable to the viewer. However, at times a shift in the sociopolitical climate induced a change in iconography. Stelae were an ideal format for public propaganda since, unlike earlier architectural sculpture, they were personalised to a specific king, could be arranged in public spaces and were portable, allowing them to be moved and reset in a new location. An important feature of stelae was that they were able to survive different phases of architectural construction, unlike architectural sculpture itself. With the ability to portray an identifiable ruler bearing elite goods, accompanied by hieroglyphic text and carrying out actions in service of the kingdom, stelae became one of the most effective ways of delivering public propaganda in the Maya lowlands. In 7th-century Copán, king Chan Imix Kʼawiil raised a series of seven stelae that marked the boundary of the most fertile land in the Copán valley, an area of approximately 25 to 30 square kilometres (9.7 to 11.6 sq mi). As well as marking the boundary, they defined the sacred geometry of the city and referred to important seats of deities in the ceremonial centre of the Copán.

=== Ritual significance ===
Stelae were considered to be invested with holiness and, perhaps, even to contain a divine soul-like essence that almost made them living beings. Some were apparently given individual names in hieroglyphic texts and were considered to be participants in rituals conducted at their location. Such rituals in the Classic Period appear to have included a kʼaltun binding ritual, in which the stela was wrapped in bands of tied cloth. This ritual was closely tied to the kʼatun-ending calendrical ceremony. A kʼaltun ritual is depicted carved onto a peccary skull deposited as a funerary offering at Copán, the scene shows two nobles flanking a stela-altar pair where the stela seems to have been bound with cloth. The act of wrapping or binding a sacred object was of considerable religious importance across Mesoamerica, and is well attested among the Maya right up to the present day. The precise meaning of the act is not clear, but may be to protect the bound object or to contain its sacred essence. The binding of stelae may be linked to the modern Kʼicheʼ Maya practice of wrapping small divinatory stones in a bundle.

A stela was not just considered a neutral portrait, it was considered to be 'owned' by the subject, whether that subject was a person or a god. Stela 3 from El Zapote in Guatemala is a small monument dating from the Early Classic period, the front of the stela bears a portrait of the rain god Yaxhal Chaak, "Clear Water Chaak". The accompanying text describes how the deity Yaxhal Chaak himself was dedicated, not just his image on the stela. This could be taken to imply that the stela was seen as the embodiment of the deity and is also true of those stelae bearing royal portraits, which were seen to be the supernatural embodiment of the ruler they represented. The stela, combined with any accompanying altar, was a perpetual enactment of royal ceremony in stone. David Stuart has stated that stelae "do not simply commemorate past events and royal ceremonies but serve to perpetuate the ritual act into eternity", thus ascribing a magical effectiveness to stela depictions. In the same vein, stelae bearing royal portraits may have been magically loaded extensions of the royal person (uba 'his self'), extremely powerful confirmations of political and religious authority. Stelae bearing images of multiple people, for instance of several nobles performing a ritual or of a king with his war captives, were likely to be exceptions to this idea of the stela as sacred embodiment of the subject.

At times, when a new king came to power, old stelae would be respectfully buried and replaced with new ones, or they might be broken. When a Maya city was invaded by a rival, it was pillaged by the victors. One of the most striking archaeological markers of such an invasion is the destruction of the defeated city's stelae, which were broken and cast down. At the end of the Preclassic, around 150 AD, this fate appears to have befallen the important city of El Mirador, where most of the stelae were found smashed.

== Manufacture ==
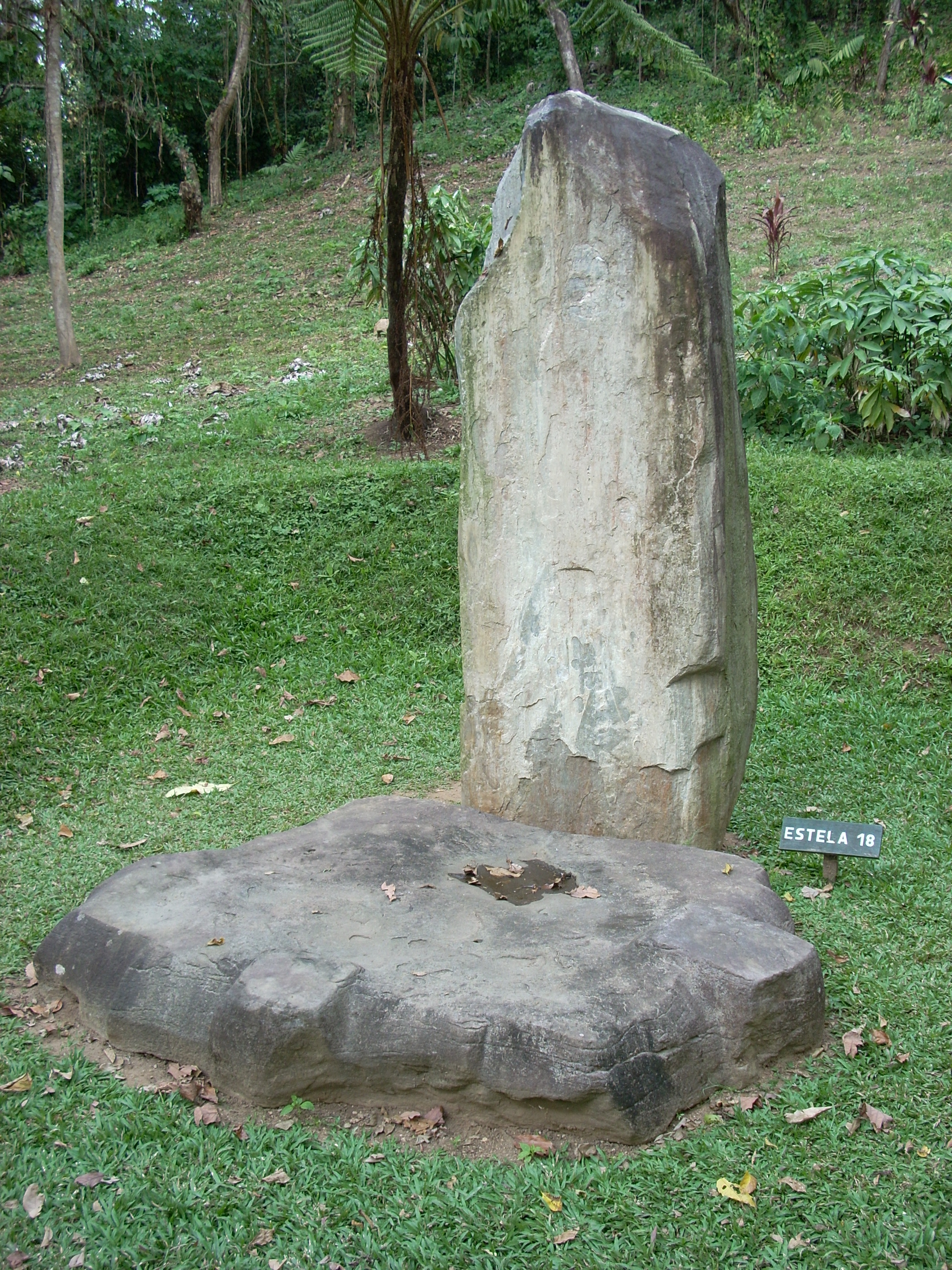
A typical stela-altar pairing from Takalik Abaj, both of them being plain monuments

Royal artisans were sometimes responsible for sculpting stelae; in some cases these sculptors were actually the sons of kings. In other cases it is likely that captive artisans from defeated cities were put to work raising stelae for the victors, as evidenced by the sculptural style of one city appearing upon monuments of its conqueror soon after its defeat. This appears to have been the case in Piedras Negras where Stela 12 depicting war captives submitting to the victorious king is carved in the style of Pomoná, the defeated city. Archaeologists believe that this may also have been the case with Quiriguá after its surprise defeat of its overlord Copán.

Stelae were usually crafted from quarried limestone, although in the Southern Maya area other types of stone were preferred. Volcanic tuff was used at Copán to craft their stelae in three dimensions. Both limestone and tuff were easily worked when first quarried and hardened with exposure to the elements. At Quiriguá a hard red sandstone was used that was unable to reproduce the three-dimensionality of Copán but was of sufficient strength that the kings of the city were able to raise the tallest free-standing stone monuments in the Americas. The Maya lacked beasts of burden and did not employ the wheel; therefore the freshly quarried blocks of stone had to be transported on rollers along the Maya causeways. Evidence of this has been found on the causeways themselves, where rollers have been recovered. The blocks were sculpted to their final form while still soft and they then hardened naturally with time. Stone was usually quarried locally but was occasionally transported over great distances. Calakmul in Mexico was one of two powerful cities that shaped the political landscape of the Classic Period, the other being Tikal. It imported black slate for one stela from the Maya Mountains, more than 320 kilometres (200 mi) away. Although Calakmul raised the greatest number of stelae known from any Maya city, they were sculpted from poor quality limestone and have suffered severe erosion, rendering most of them illegible. Stelae could be of substantial size; Quiriguá Stela E measures 10.6 metres (35 ft) from the base to the top, including the 3-metre (9.8 ft) buried portion holding it in place. This particular monument has a claim to being the largest free-standing stone monument in the New World and weighs about 59 tonnes (65 short tons). Stela 1 at Ixkun is one of the tallest monuments in the Petén Basin, measuring 4.13 metres (13.5 ft) high, not including the buried portion, and is roughly 2 metres (6.6 ft) wide and 0.39 metres (1.3 ft) thick.

Maya stelae were worked with stone chisels and probably with wooden mallets. Hammerstones were fashioned from flint and basalt and were used for shaping the softer rocks used to make stelae, while fine detail was completed with smaller chisels. Originally most were probably brightly painted in red, yellow, black, blue and other colours using mineral and organic pigments. At Copán and some other Maya cities, some traces of these pigments were found upon the monuments.

Generally all sides of a stela were sculpted with human figures and hieroglyphic text, with each side forming a part of a single composition. Undecorated stelae in the form of plain slabs or columns of stone are found throughout the Maya region. These appear never to have been painted or to have been decorated with overlaid stucco sculpture.

Dimensions of selected stelae
Site name	Location	Monument	Height	Width	Thickness
Itzimté	Campeche, Mexico	Stela 6	1.32 metres (4.3 ft)	0.82 metres (2.7 ft)	unknown
Ixkun	Petén Department, Guatemala	Stela 1	4.13 metres (13.5 ft) (Note: Height above ground.)	2 metres (6.6 ft)	0.39 metres (1.3 ft)
Ixkun	Petén Department, Guatemala	Stela 5	2.65 metres (8.7 ft) (Note: Original height before being broken into fragments.)	1.00 metre (3.28 ft)	0.26 metres (0.85 ft)
Kaminaljuyu	Guatemala Department, Guatemala	Stela 11	1.98 metres (6.5 ft)	0.68 metres (2.2 ft)	0.18 metres (0.59 ft)
Machaquilá	Petén Department, Guatemala	Stela 2	2.1 metres (6.9 ft)	1.2 metres (3.9 ft)	unknown
Nakbé	Petén Department, Guatemala	Stela 1	1.63 metres (5.3 ft)	1.55 metres (5.1 ft)	0.25 metres (0.82 ft)
Piedras Negras	Petén Department, Guatemala	Stela 12	3 metres (9.8 ft)	1 metre (3.3 ft)	0.42 metres (1.4 ft)
Quiriguá	Izabal Department, Guatemala	Stela E	10.6 metres (35 ft) (Note: Total height including buried portion.)	unknown	unknown
Takalik Abaj	Retalhuleu Department, Guatemala	Stela 2	2.2 metres (7.2 ft)	1.43 metres (4.7 ft)	unknown
Takalik Abaj	Retalhuleu Department, Guatemala	Stela 5	2.11 metres (6.9 ft)	1.22 metres (4.0 ft)	0.6 metres (2.0 ft)
Tikal	Petén Department, Guatemala	Stela 9	2.1 metres (6.9 ft)	unknown	unknown
Tikal	Petén Department, Guatemala	Stela 29	1.33 metres (4.4 ft) (Note: Maximum height of surviving fragment.)	unknown	unknown
Toniná	Chiapas, Mexico	Monument 101	1.04 metres (3.4 ft)	0.31 metres (1.0 ft)	0.2 metres (0.66 ft)

== History ==
=== Preclassic origins ===
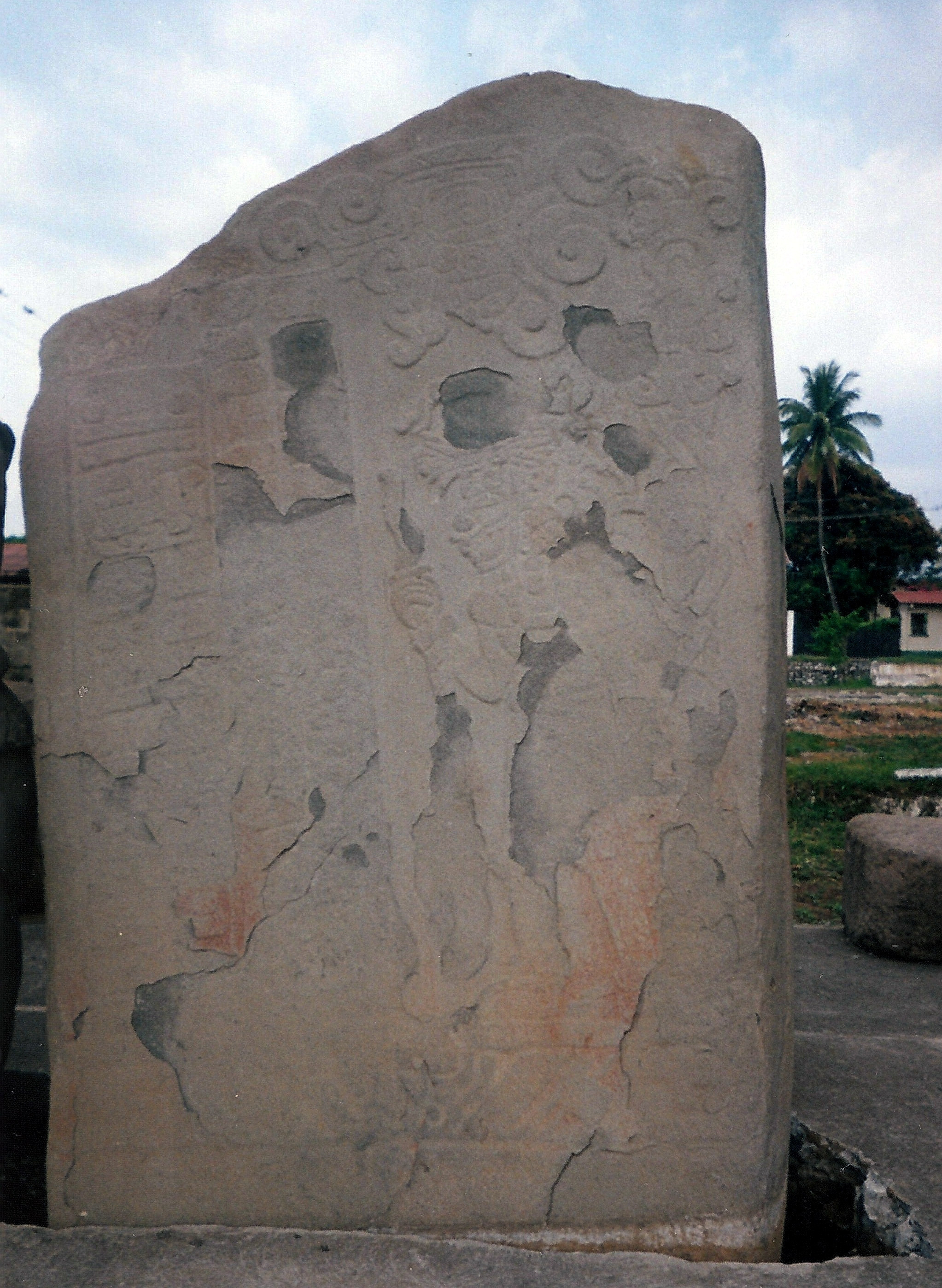
Stela 1 at El Baúl

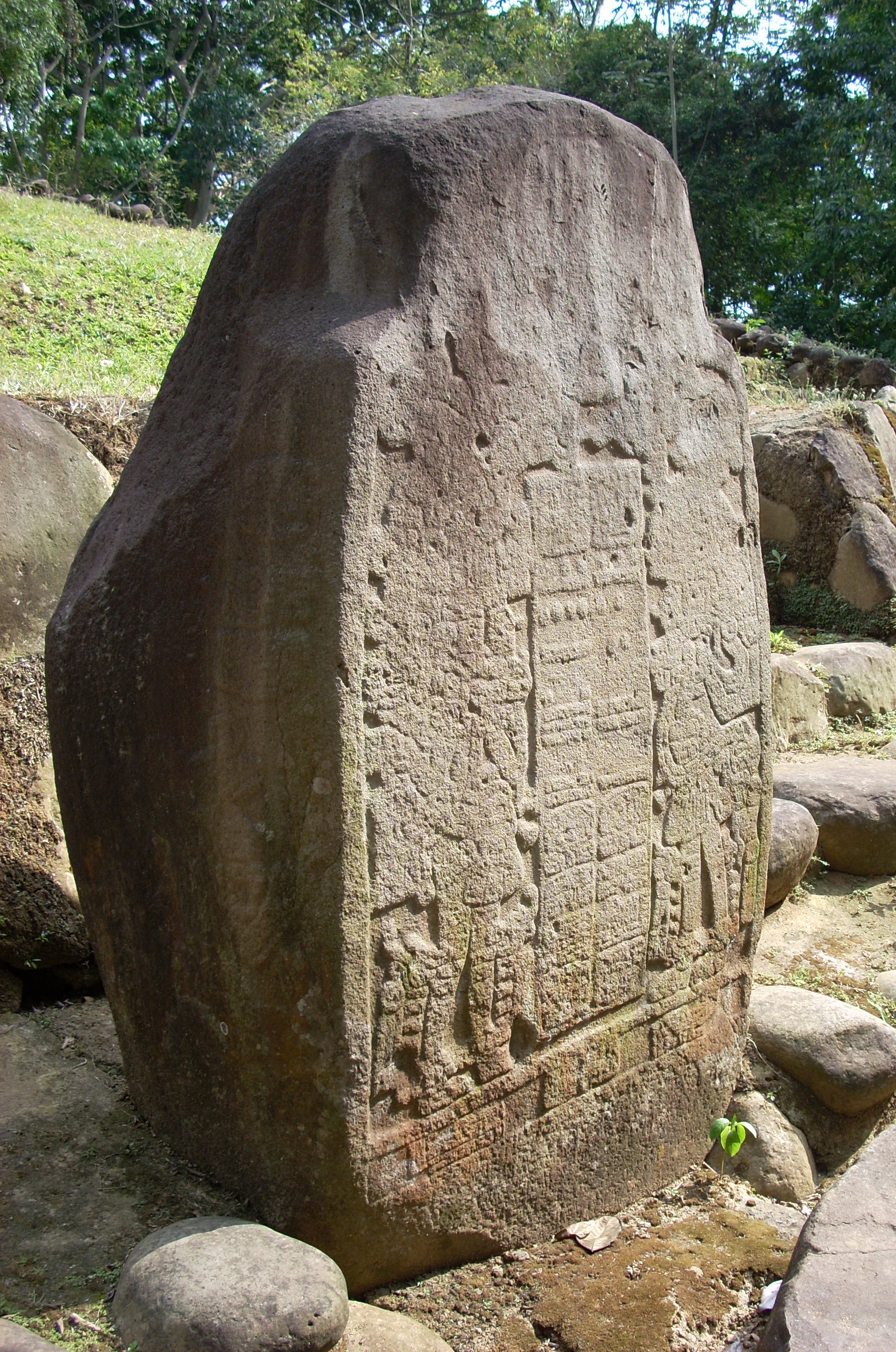
Stela 5 at Takalik Abaj

The Maya sculptural tradition that produced the stelae emerged fully formed and had probably been preceded by sculpted wooden monuments. However the tradition of raising stelae had its origin elsewhere in Mesoamerica, among the Olmecs of the Gulf Coast of Mexico. In the Late Preclassic it then spread into the Isthmus of Tehuantepec and southwards along the Pacific Coast to sites such as Chiapa de Corzo, Izapa and Takalik Abaj where Mesoamerican Long Count calendar dates began to be carved onto the stelae. Although at Izapa the stelae depicted mythological scenes, at Takalik Abaj they began to show rulers in Early Classic Maya posture accompanied by calendrical dates and hieroglyphic texts. It was also at Takalik Abaj and Izapa that these stelae began to be paired with circular altars. By approximately 400 BC, near the end of the Middle Preclassic Period, early Maya rulers were raising stelae that celebrated their achievements and validated their right to rule. At El Portón in the Salamá Valley of highland Guatemala a carved schist stela (Monument 1) was erected, the badly eroded hieroglyphs appear to be a very early form of Maya writing and may even be the earliest known example of Maya script. It was associated with a plain altar in a typical stela-altar pairing that would become common across the Maya area. Stela 11 from Kaminaljuyu, a major Preclassic highland city, dates to the Middle Preclassic and is the earliest stela to depict a standing ruler. The sculpted Preclassic stelae from Kaminaljuyu and other cities in the region, such as Chalchuapa in El Salvador and Chocolá in the Pacific lowlands, tend to depict political succession, sacrifice and warfare.

These early stelae depicted rulers as warriors or wearing the masks and headdresses of Maya deities, accompanied by texts that recorded dates and achievements during their reigns, as well as recording their relationships with their ancestors. Stelae came to be displayed in large ceremonial plazas designed to display these monuments to maximum effect. The raising of stelae spread from the Pacific Coast and adjacent highlands throughout the Maya area. The development of Maya stelae coincides with the development of divine kingship among the Classic Maya. In the southern Maya area, the Late Preclassic stelae impressed upon the viewer the achievements of the king and his right to rule, thus reinforcing both his political and religious power.

Location of the Olmec heartland relative to the southern Maya area

At the Middle Preclassic city of Nakbe in the central lowlands, Maya sculptors were producing some of the earliest lowland Maya stelae, depicting richly dressed individuals. Nakbe Stela 1 has been dated to around 400 BC. It was broken into pieces, but originally represented two elaborately dressed figures facing each other, and perhaps represents the transference of power from one ruler to his successor, however it also has features that recall the myth of the Maya Hero Twins, and would be the earliest known presentation of them. Around 200 BC the enormous nearby city of El Mirador had started to erect stela-like monuments, bearing inscriptions that appear to be glyphs but that are so far unreadable. Stela dating to the Late Preclassic period are also known from the sites of El Tintal, Cival, and San Bartolo in Guatemala, and Actuncan and Cahal Pech in Belize.

On the Pacific Coast El Baúl Stela 1 features a date in its hieroglyphic text that equates to 36 AD. It depicts a ruler bearing a sceptre or a spear with a double column of hieroglyphic text before him. At Takalik Abaj are two stelae (Stela 2 and Stela 5) depicting the transfer of power from one ruler to another; they both show two elaborately dressed figures facing each other with a column of hieroglyphic text between them. The Long Count date on Stela 2 dates it to the 1st century BC at the latest, while Stela 5 has two dates, the latest of which is 126 AD. The stela was associated with the burial of a human sacrifice and other offerings. Stela 13 at Takalik Abaj also dates to the Late Preclassic; a massive offering of more than 600 ceramic vessels was found at its base, together with 33 obsidian prismatic blades and other artefacts. Both the stela and the offering were associated with a nearby Late Preclassic royal tomb. At Cuello in Belize, a plain stela was raised around 100 AD in an open plaza.

At the very end of the Preclassic Period, around 100–300 AD, cities in the highlands and along the Pacific Coast ceased to raise sculpted stelae bearing hieroglyphic texts. This cessation in the production of stelae was the most dramatic symptom of a general decline in the region at this time. This decline has been linked to the intrusion of peoples from the western highlands combined with the disastrous eruption of the Ilopango Volcano that severely affected the entire region.

=== Early Classic ===
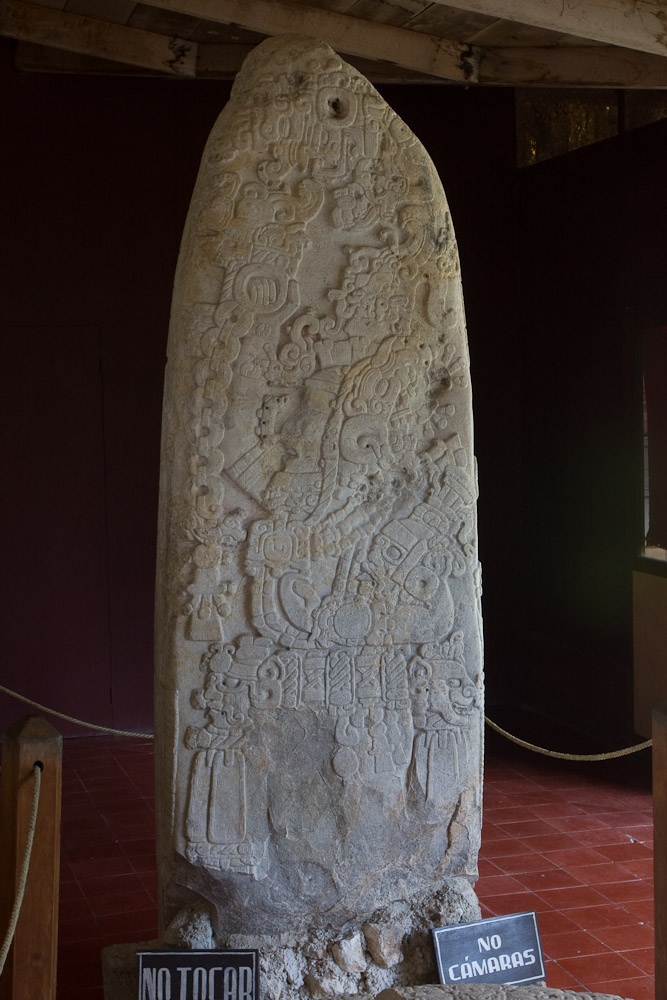
Stela 31 from Tikal

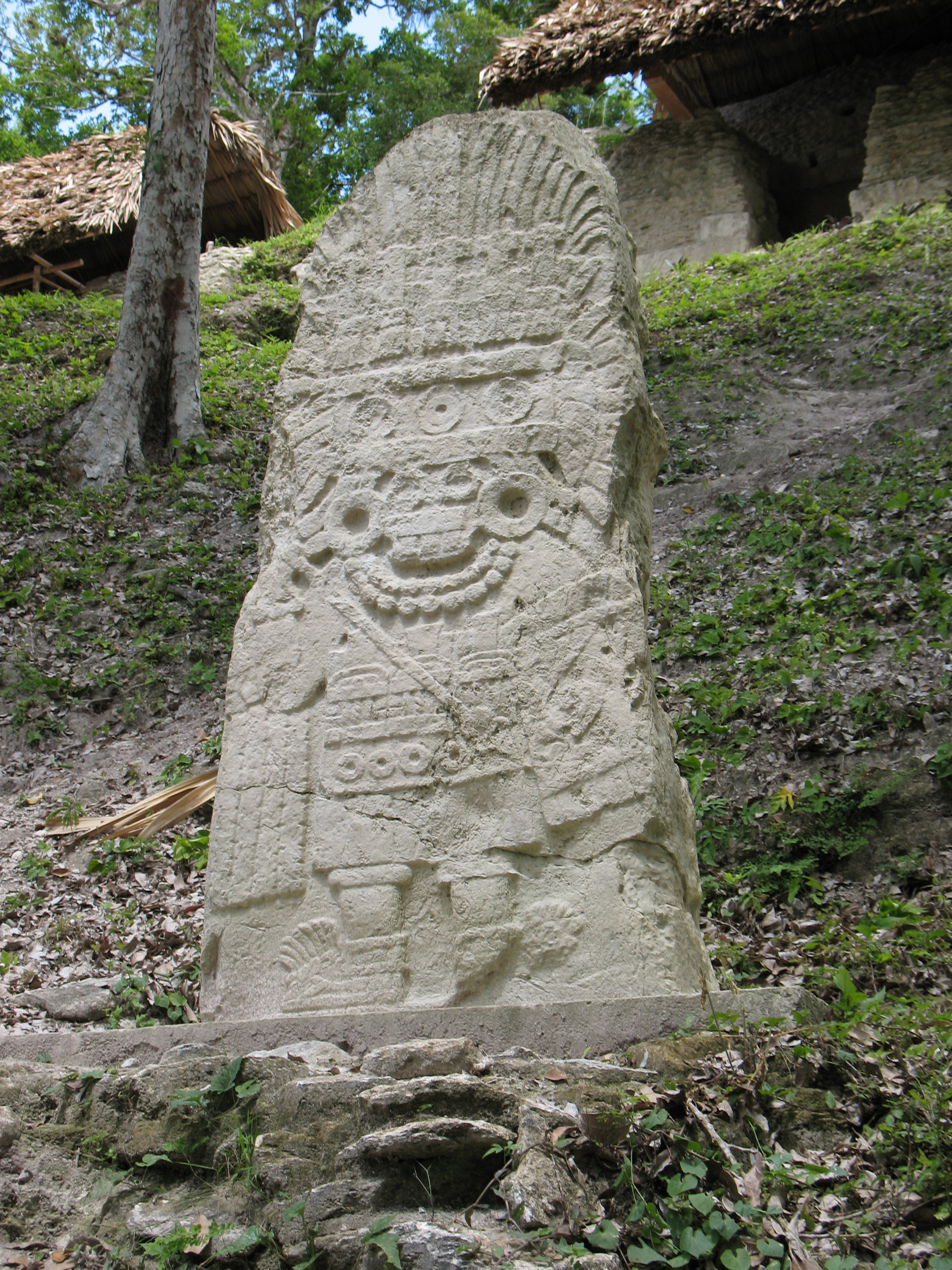
Stela from Yaxha slot5000 depicting a Teotihuacan-style warrior

In the central Petén lowlands, the rise of individual rule at cities like Tikal required the development of new forms of public imagery. Preclassic imagery had involved largely anonymous, impersonal sculpture as an architectural element. The existing Preclassic Petén styles of architectural sculpture were combined with features of the highland and Pacific Coast tradition to produce the Early Classic Maya stela. Features formerly found on architectural sculpture, such as the giant masks adorning Preclassic pyramids, were adapted for use on stelae. For example, the so-called "Jester God" was transferred to the headdress of the ruler portrayed on Tikal Stela 29, which bears the oldest Long Count date yet found in the Maya lowlands – equating to 292 AD. At some Maya cities the first appearance of stelae corresponded with the foundation of dynastic rule.

The standard form of the Maya stela incorporating art, calendrical dates and hieroglyphic text onto a royal monument only began to be erected in the Maya lowlands after 250 AD. The late 4th century saw the introduction of non-Maya imagery linked to the giant metropolis of Teotihuacan in the Valley of Mexico. This foreign influence is seen at Tikal, Uaxactun, Río Azul and El Zapote, all in the Petén Department of Guatemala. At Tikal this was initiated by the king Yax Nuun Ayiin I, from there it spread to his vassal cities. In the 5th century, this strongly Teotihuacan-linked imagery was abandoned by Yax Nuun Ayiin I's son Siyaj Chan Kʼawiil II, who reintroduced imagery associated with the Pacific Coast and adjacent highlands. Minor references to Teotihuacan continued, for example in the form of Teotihuacan war emblems. His Stela 31 was originally erected in 445 but was later broken from its butt and was found buried in the city centre, almost directly above his tomb. It depicts the crowning of Siyaj Chan Kʼawiil II, with his father hovering above him as a supernatural being and is executed in traditional Maya style. On the sides of the stela are carved two portraits of his father in a non-Maya style, dressed as a Teotihuacan warrior, bearing the central Mexican atlatl spear-thrower not adopted by the Maya, and carrying a shield adorned with the face of the Mexican god Tlaloc. The reverse of the stela bears a lengthy hieroglyphic inscription detailing the history of Tikal, including the Teotihuacan invasion that established Yax Nuun Ayiin I and his dynasty.

In the Early Classic period the Maya kings began to dedicate a new stela, or other monument, to mark the end of each kʼatun cycle (representing 7,200 days, just under 20 sidereal years). At Tikal, the first to do so was king Kan Chitam who ruled in the late 5th century. Stela 9 from the city is the first dated monument raised to mark off a period of time, it was raised in 475.

=== Late Classic ===
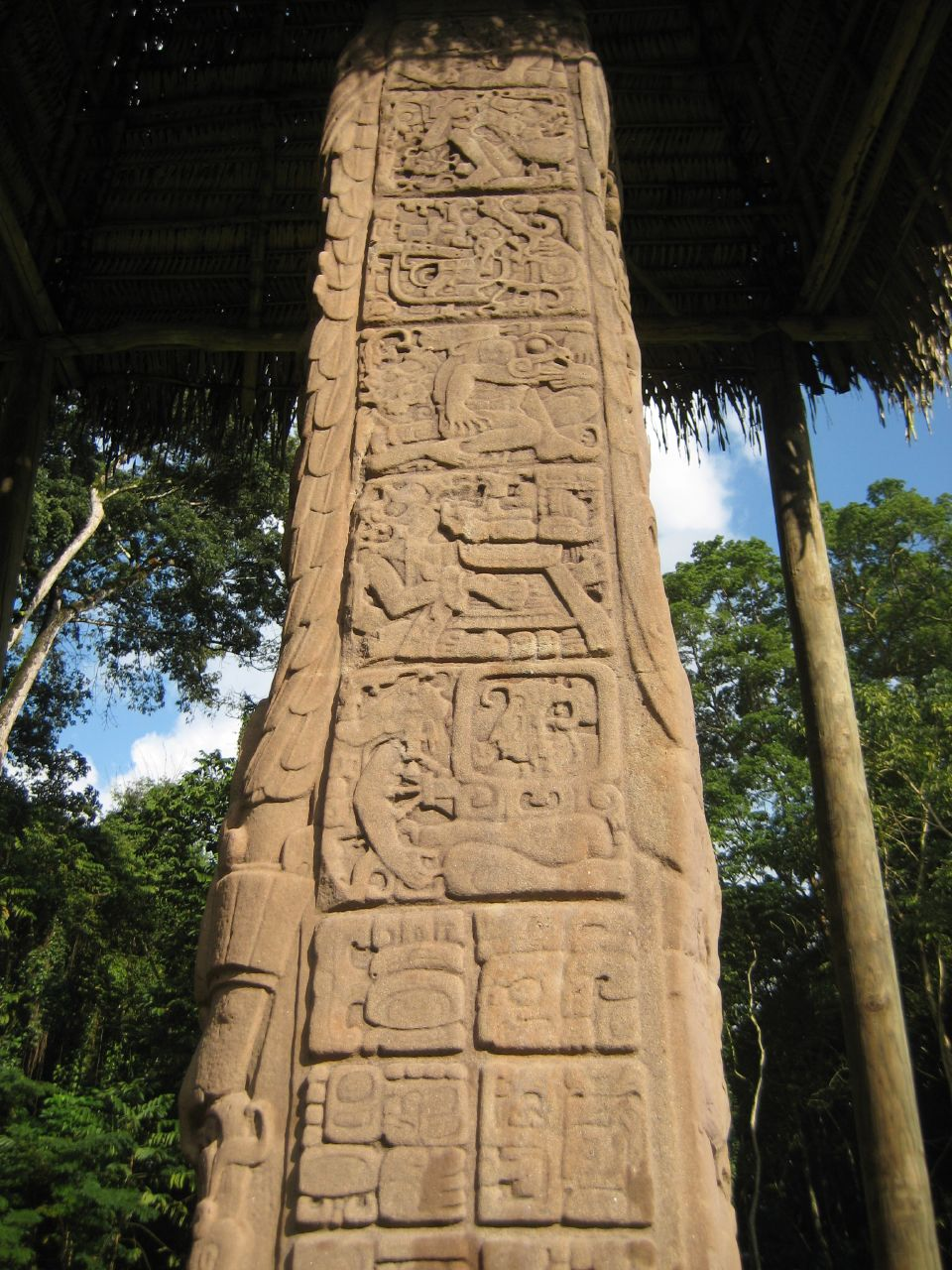
Hieroglyphic text on the side of Stela E at Quiriguá

In the Late Classic the sculpted images of rulers on stelae remained much the same as in the Early Classic, appearing in profile in the foreground and filling almost the entire available space, which is delimited by a frame. Imagery associated with the Mesoamerican ballgame started to appear in the Maya lowlands in the Late Classic Period. Maya kings are depicted as warriors wearing costume from the Mexican highlands, including elements such as the foreign god Tlaloc and the Teotihacan serpent. Such imagery appears in the Late Classic on stelae from Naranjo, Piedras Negras and the Petexbatún cities of Dos Pilas and Aguateca. At Dos Pilas, a pair of stelae represent the king of the city in costume forming a jaguar and eagle pairing, characteristic of the Mexican warrior cult. Stelae were being erected by the Maya across the entire central and southern Maya lowlands by 790, an area that encompassed 150,000 square kilometres (58,000 sq mi).

In the north, Coba on the eastern side of the Yucatán Peninsula raised at least 23 large stelae. Although badly eroded their style and texts link them to cities from the Petén Basin. At the southern periphery of the Maya region, Copán developed a new high-relief style of stelae and in 652 the twelfth king Chan Imix Kʼawiil arranged a series of these stelae to define the sacred geometry of the city, and to celebrate his royal rule and his ancestors. His son and successor Uaxaclajuun Ubʼaah Kʼawiil further developed this new high-relief style of sculpture and erected a series of intricately decorated stelae in the city's Great Plaza that brought the carving of stelae close to full in-the-round three-dimensional sculpture. Both of these kings focused on their own images on their stelae and emphasised their place in the dynastic sequence to justify their rule, possibly linked to a break in the dynastic sequence with the death of the eleventh king of Copán.

After Quiriguá defeated its overlord Copán in 738, it brought massive blocks of red sandstone from quarries 5 kilometres (3.1 mi) from the city and sculpted a series of enormous stelae that were the biggest monolithic monuments ever raised by the Maya. Stela E stands over 10 metres (33 ft) high and weighs more than 60 tons. These stelae were shaped into a square cross-section and were decorated on all four faces. These stelae usually bear two images of the Quiriguá king, on the front and the back, in a lower relief than that found at Copán. They feature highly complex panels of hieroglyphic text that are among the most skillfully executed of all Maya inscriptions in stone. The stelae have weathered well and display fine precision on the part of the sculptors.

=== Terminal Classic ===
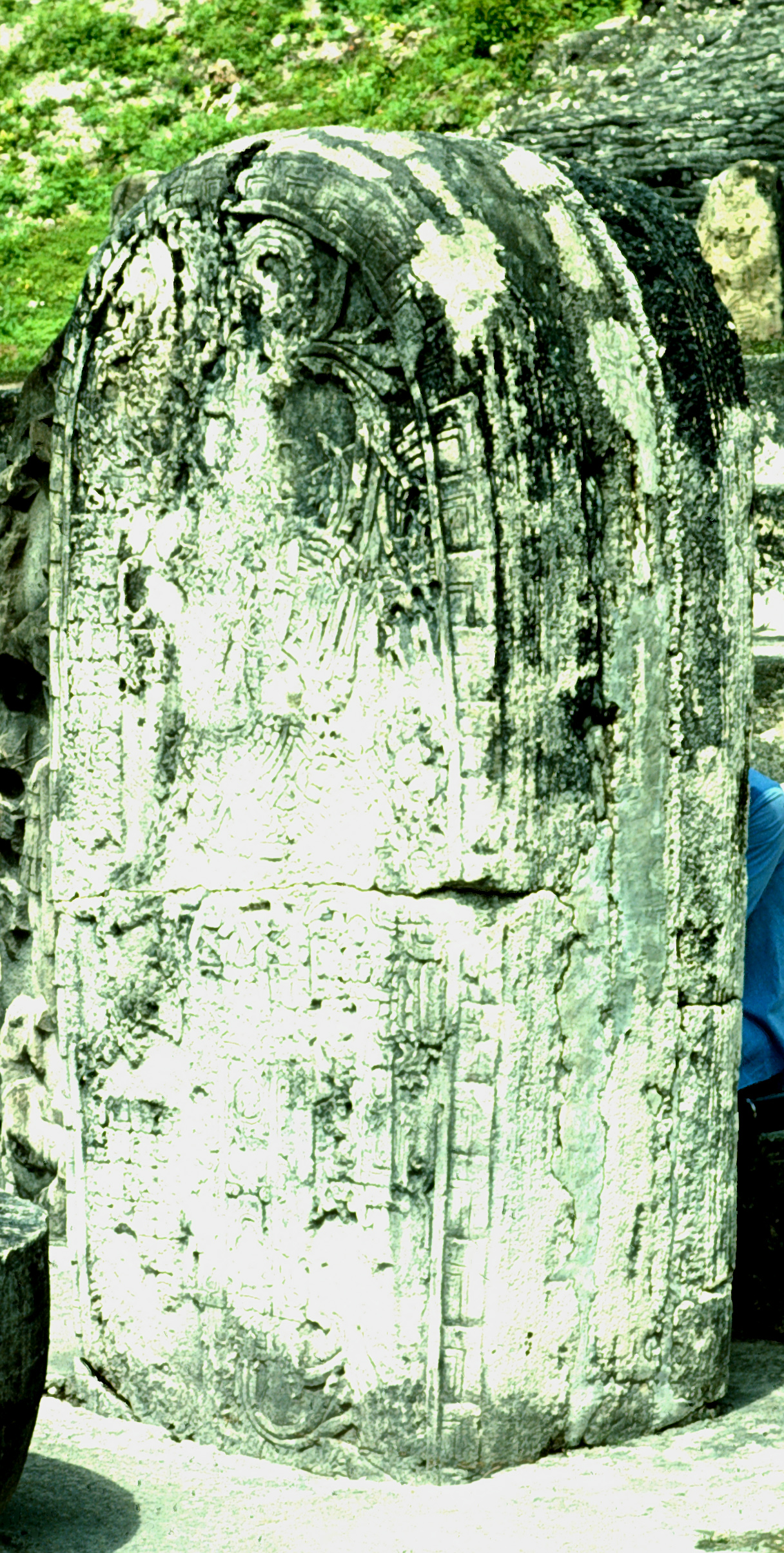
Stela 11 from Tikal, the last to be raised at the city

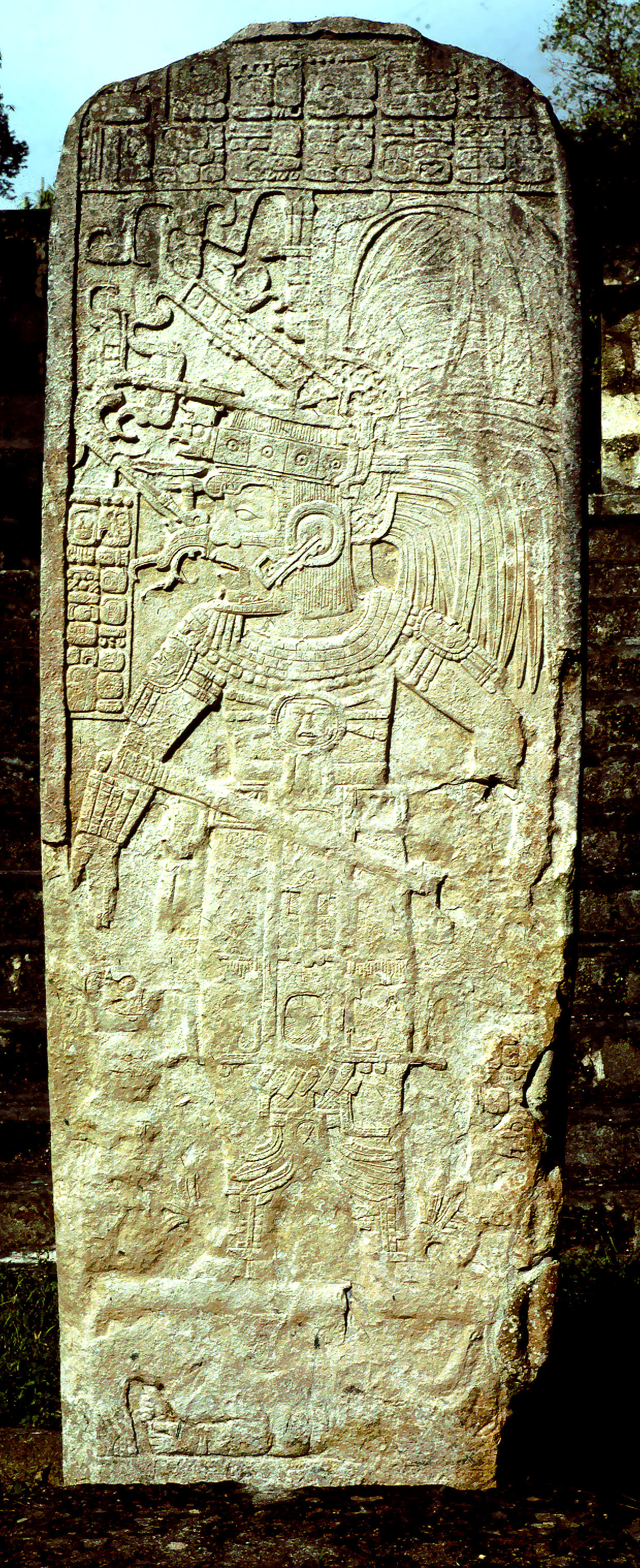
Stela 11 from Seibal, displaying foreign influence

The decline in the erection of stelae is linked to the decline in the institution of divine kingship, which began in the Late Preclassic. Originally the stelae depicted the king with symbols of power, sometimes standing over defeated enemies and occasionally accompanied by his wives or his heir. By the Terminal Classic, kings were sharing stelae with subordinate lords, who also played a prominent role in the events depicted. This reflected a decentralisation of power and the bargaining between high-ranking nobles so that the king could maintain power, but led to a progressive weakening of the king's rule. As the position of the king became weaker and that of his vassals and subordinates became stronger, the latter began to erect their own stelae, a function that was formerly the exclusive preserve of the king himself. Some of these subordinates broke away to form their own petty states, but even this did not last and they also ceased to erect monuments.

In the Pasión River region of Petén, rulers began to be portrayed as ballplayers on stelae. Seibal was the first site in the region to depict its rulers thus. Seventeen stelae were erected at Seibal between 849 and 889, and show a mix of Maya and foreign styles, including a lord wearing the beaked mask of Ehecatl, the central Mexican wind god, with a Mexican-style speech scroll emerging from the mouth. Some of these have a stylistic affinity with the painted murals at Cacaxtla, a non-Maya site in the central Mexican state of Tlaxcala. This hybrid style seems to indicate that the kings of Seibal were Maya lords adapting to changing political conditions by adopting a mix of symbols originating from both lowland Maya and central Mexican sources. Some of the more foreign-looking stelae even bear non-Maya calendrical glyphs. Stelae at Oxkintok, to the north in the Puuc region of the Yucatán Peninsula, divided the face of the stela into up to three levels, each of which contained a different scene, usually of a lone figure that could be either male or female. The representation of the human figure differed from the formal treatment in the south, and were simplified, coarse representations lacking individuality amongst sociopolitical and religious symbols.

As the Classic Maya collapse swept across the Maya region, city after city ceased to erect stelae recording its dynastic achievements. At the important city of Calakmul, two stelae were raised in 800 and three more in 810, but these were the last and the city fell into silence. At Oxkintok the last stela was raised in 859. Stela 11, dated to 869, was the last monument to ever be erected at the once great city of Tikal. The last known Maya stelae bearing a Long Count calendrical date are Toniná Monument 101, which was erected in 909 to mark the kʼatun ending that year, and Stela 6 from Itzimté, dated to 910.

=== Postclassic ===
At Copán ritual offerings were deposited around the city's stelae until at least 1000, which may represent the offerings of a surviving elite that still remembered its ancestors, or may be due to highland Maya still regarding the city as a place of pilgrimage long after it had fallen into ruin. A small number of sculpted stelae once stood at Cerro Quiac in the Guatemalan Highlands, and are presumed to have been erected by Mam Maya in the 13th or 14th century. At Lamanai in Belize, Classic period stelae were repositioned upon two small Postclassic platforms dating to the 15th or 16th century. At La Milpa, also in Belize, at around the time of Spanish contact in the late 16th century a tiny remnant Maya population started to make offerings of Conquest-period pottery to stelae, perhaps in an effort to invoke the ancestors to help resist the Spanish onslaught. A plain stela in Twin Pyramid Group R at Tikal was removed by the local inhabitants some time during the Postclassic; its accompanying altar was also moved but abandoned some distance from its original location. Some plain stelae were raised at Topoxté in the Petén Lakes region of Guatemala in the Postclassic; these were perhaps covered in stucco and painted. This may represent a revival of the katun-ending ceremonies that occurred in the Classic Period, and reflected ties with the northern Yucatán.

== Discovery ==
One of the earliest accounts of Maya stelae comes from Diego Garcia de Palacio, a Spanish colonial official who described six of the stelae at Copán in a letter to king Philip II of Spain written in 1576. Juan Galindo, governor of Petén, visited Copán in 1834 and noted the sculpted high-relief stelae there. Five years later, American diplomat John Lloyd Stephens and British artist Frederick Catherwood arrived in war-torn Central America and set out for Copán, describing fifteen stelae in Stephens' Incidents of Travel in Central America, Chiapas and Yucatán, published in 1841. Stephens and Catherwood noticed the presence of red pigment on some of the Copán stelae. Stephens unsuccessfully attempted to buy the ruins of Quiriguá, and purchased Copán for US$50 ($ 1,500 in 2025) with the idea of shipping the stelae to New York for display in a new museum. In the event, he was prevented from shipping the monuments down the Copán River by the discovery of impassable rapids and all the stelae remained at the site. While Stephens was engaged on business elsewhere, Catherwood carried out a brief investigation of the stelae at Quiriguá but found them very difficult to draw without a camera lucida due to their great height. Ambrosio Tut, governor of Petén, and colonel Modesto Méndez, the chief magistrate, visited the ruins of Tikal in 1848 accompanied by Eusebio Lara, who drew some of the monuments there. In 1852 Modesto Méndez went on to discover Stela 1 and Stela 5 at Ixkun. English explorer Alfred Maudslay arrived at Quiriguá in 1881 and cleared the vegetation from the stelae, then travelled on to see the stelae at Copán. In the early 20th century, an expedition by the Carnegie Institution led by American Mayanist Sylvanus Morley discovered a stela at Uaxactun. This period marked a change from the efforts of individual explorers to those of institutions that funded archaeological exploration, excavation and restoration.

== Collections ==
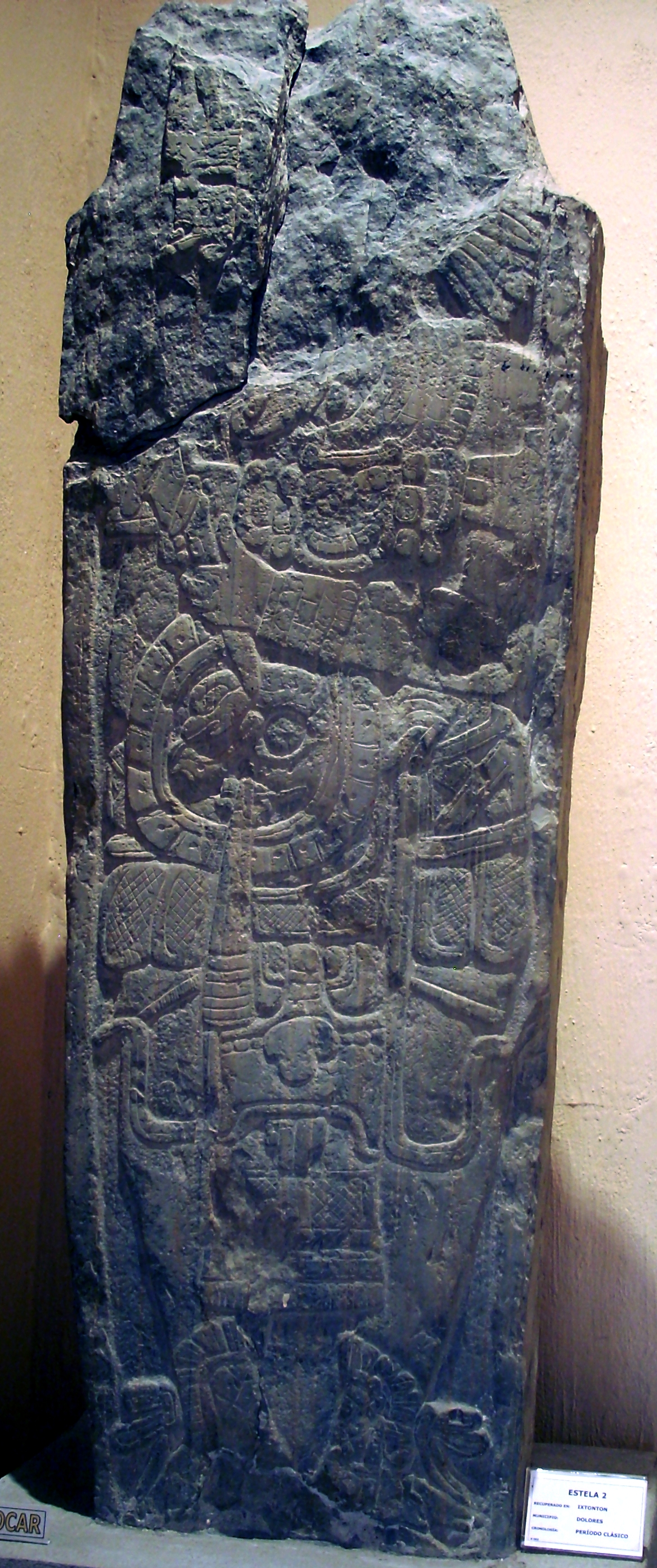
Ixtonton Stela 2 on display at the Museo Regional del Sureste de Petén in Dolores, Guatemala

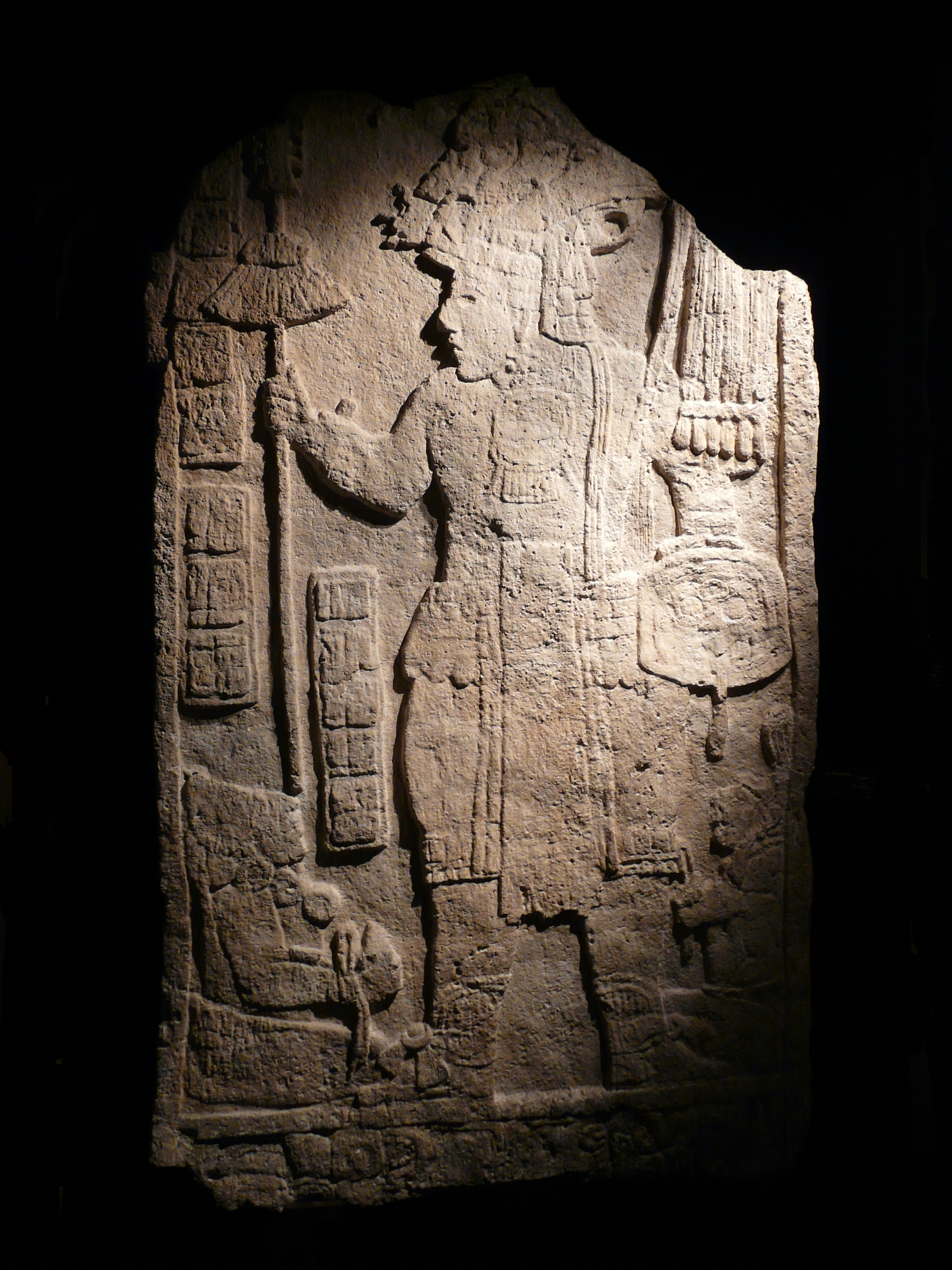
Aguateca Stela 6 on display at the Chilean Museum of Pre-Columbian Art in Santiago de Chile.

Notable collections of stelae on public display include an impressive series of 8th-century monuments at Quiriguá and 21 stelae collected in the sculpture museum at Tikal National Park, both of which are World Heritage Sites in Guatemala. Calakmul, in Mexico, is another World Heritage site that also includes many stelae regarded as outstanding examples of Maya art. Copán in Honduras, also a World Heritage Site, possesses over 10 finely carved stelae in the site core alone.

The Museo Nacional de Arqueología y Etnología ("National Museum of Archaeology and Ethnology") in Guatemala City displays a number of fine stelae, including three 9th-century stelae from Machaquilá, an 8th-century stela from Naranjo and other stelae from Ixtutz, Kaminaljuyu, La Amelia, Piedras Negras, Seibal, Tikal, Uaxactun and Ucanal. The Museo Nacional de Antropología ("National Museum of Anthropology") in Mexico City has a small number of Maya stelae on display. The San Diego Museum of Man in California contains replicas of the stelae from Quiriguá that were made in 1915 for the Pacific-California Exhibition.

Many Maya archaeological sites have stelae on display in their original locations, in Guatemala these include, but are not limited to, Aguateca, Dos Pilas, El Chal, Ixkun, Nakum, Seibal, Takalik Abaj, Uaxactun, and Yaxha. In Mexico, stelae may be seen at Yaxchilan, and the site museum at Toniná.

== Looting ==
Stelae have become threatened in modern times by plundering for sale on the international art market. Many stelae are found in remote areas and their size and weight prevents them from being removed intact. Various methods are used to cut or break a stela for easier transport, including power saws, chisels, acid and heat. When a monument is well preserved, the looters attempt to cut off its face for transport. Even when successful, this results in damage to inscriptions on the sides of the stela. At worst, this method results in complete fragmentation of the stela face with any recoverable sculpture removed for sale. Traceable fragments of well known monuments have been purchased by American museums and private collectors in the past. When such monuments are removed from their original context, their historical meaning is lost. Although museums have justified their acquisition of stelae fragments with the argument that such objects are better preserved in an institution, no stela has been sold in as good a condition as it was in its original location. After 1970 there was a sharp drop in Maya stelae available on the New York art market due to the ratification of a treaty with Mexico that guarantees the return of stolen pre-Columbian sculpture that was removed from the country after the ratification date. In the early 1970s some museums, such as that of the University of Pennsylvania, responded to international criticism by no longer purchasing archaeological artefacts that lack a legally documented history, including place of origin, previous owners and an export license. Harvard University also instituted a similar policy in the early 1970s.

In 1972, the initially well preserved Stela 5 at Ixkun was smashed into pieces by looters, who heated it until it shattered and then stole various pieces. A number of remaining fragments of the monument were rescued by archaeologist Ian Graham and transferred to the mayor's office in Dolores, Petén, where they were eventually used as construction material before once again being recovered, this time by the Atlas Arqueológico de Guatemala in 1989, and moved to their archaeological laboratory. At the nearby site of Ixtonton, 7.5 kilometres (4.7 mi) from Ixkun, most of the stelae were robbed before the site's existence was reported to the Guatemalan authorities. By the time archaeologists visited the site in 1985 only 2 stelae remained.

In 1974, a dealer in pre-Columbian artefacts by the name of Hollinshead arranged for the illegal removal of Machaquilá Stela 2 from the Guatemalan jungle. He and his co-conspirators were prosecuted in the United States under the National Stolen Property Act and they were the first people to be convicted under this act with reference to national patrimony laws. The act states:

"whoever transports, transmits, or transfers in interstate or foreign commerce any goods ... of the value of $5,000 or more, knowing the same to have been stolen, converted or taken by fraud... [s]hall be fined under this title or imprisoned not more than ten years, or both... "[w]hoever receives, possesses, conceals, stores, barters, sells, or disposes of any goods .. . which have crossed a State or United States boundary after being stolen, unlawfully converted, or taken, knowing the same to have been stolen, unlawfully converted, or taken (is subject to fine or imprisonment)."

The act was originally intended to discourage the handling of stolen property but several courts have judged that the National Stolen Property Act is sufficiently broad in scope to apply to goods crossing into the United States from a foreign nation, and is therefore applicable in the case of stolen cultural property.

Under Guatemalan law, Maya stelae and other archaeological artefacts are property of the Guatemalan government and may not be removed from the country without its permission. In the case of Machaquilá Stela 2, the monument was well known before it was stolen and its illegal removal was easy to prove. The stela itself was cut into pieces, with the face being sawn off and moved to a fish packing factory in Belize, where it was packed into boxes and shipped to California. There it was seized by the Federal Bureau of Investigation after being offered for sale to various institutions. The stolen portion of the stela was returned to Guatemala and is now in storage at the Museo Nacional de Arqueología y Etnología in Guatemala City.

Looting has been linked to the economic and political stability of the possessing nation, with levels of looting increasing during times of crisis. It also appears that art collectors have stelae, or portions of them, stolen to order by browsing archaeological books and catalogues for desirable pieces. Examples of this may be found at Aguateca and El Perú, both in Guatemala's Petén department, where only the better preserved hieroglyphs and human faces were cut away.

== List of known Maya stelae by city ==
Notes:
- This list, as research continues, is always open to further growth;
- The list may also contain other kinds of monuments, such as panels/lintels or zoomorphs;
- Long Count dates are presented in the shortened form, and the conversion to actual dates follows the Gregorian calendar;
- All dates are AD (CE), otherwise is noted.

Monument	Image	Date (M.A. Calendar)	Date (Greg. Calendar)	Monarch	Site	Country	Description/Event	Refs
Stela 1					Aguateca	Guatemala		
Stela 2					Aguateca	Guatemala		
Stela 6					Aguateca	Guatemala	Commemoration of a victory by the ruler of the city: the god Jaguar is represented in the warrior/monarch's shield and his two captives have bound feet.	
Stela 7					Aguateca	Guatemala		
Stela 1					Altar de Sacrificios	Guatemala	The site was named after the finding of this stela.	
Stela 2		10.1.0.0.2	30 November 849		Altar de Sacrificios	Guatemala	Latest inscribed stela found on the site.	
Stela 10		9.1.0.0.2	28 August 455		Altar de Sacrificios	Guatemala		
Stela 1			807	Lachan Kʼawiil Ajaw Bot	La Amelia	Guatemala	Portrait of the monarch.	
Lintel 2			804	Lachan Kʼawiil Ajaw Bot	La Amelia	Guatemala	Portrait of the monarch dressed as a ballplayer.	
Stela 1		7.19.15.7.12	6 March 37 CE		El Baúl	Guatemala		
Stela 7					El Baúl	Guatemala	The monarch is standing in front of a second person squatting and in a position of submission wearing paper ear-rings, symbol of the captives.	
Stela 1				Jasaw Chan Muwaan II	Bonampak	Mexico	Portrait of the monarch standing and carrying a ceremonial cane. The styling of the pupil gives him a greater strength to his look; in the lower part of the stele is observed the monster of the earth from which the faces of the young god of corn emerge. A band of glyphs under the feet of the ruler refers to his genealogy, while in another vertical band the emblem glyph of the city can be observed.	
Stela 2				Jasaw Chan Muwaan II	Bonampak	Mexico	Scene of a self-sacrifice ritual performed by the monarch, who is richly dressed (and carrying in his right hand a bag with copal from which the face of the bat god is seen) and between two women: in front of him, his mother Lady Shield Skull, who carries the stingray spines to perform the piercing, and behind him, his wife Lady Green Rabbit of Yaxchilán who wears a huipil and holds the basket with the strips of paper ready to receive the blood drops of the ruler, which will later be incinerated in honor of their deities.	
Stela 3				Jasaw Chan Muwaan II	Bonampak	Mexico	Portrait of the monarch, standing in front of a second person squatting and in a position of submission wearing paper ear-rings, symbol of the captives.	
Lintel 1		9.17.16.3.12	12 January 787	Jasaw Chan Muwaan II	Bonampak	Mexico	Portrait of the monarch capturing an enemy.	
Lintel 2		9.17.16.3.8	4 January 787	Jasaw Chan Muwaan II	Bonampak	Mexico	Portrait of the overlord of Bonampak, Yaxun Bahlam IV of Yaxchilán	
Lintel 3		9.17.9.11.14	25 July 780	Jasaw Chan Muwaan II	Bonampak	Mexico	Portrait of the predecessor of the monarch, Aj Sak Teleh	
Stela 1					Calakmul	Mexico		
Stela 7					Calakmul	Mexico		
Stela 8					Calakmul	Mexico	Celebration of an event in 593. Stela erected after his death.	
Stela 9		9.12.0.0.0	29 June 672	Yuknoom Ch'een II	Calakmul	Mexico	Portrait of Yuknoom Yichʼaak Kʼahkʼ, heir of the monarch (front); Portrait of the wife of Yuknoom Yichʼaak Kʼahkʼ (back). The text that describes the birth of king Yuknoom Yich'aak K'ahk' (6 October 649) and gives him his full royal title.	
Stela 13				Yuknoom Ch'een II	Calakmul	Mexico	Portrait of the monarch.	
Stela 23		9.13.10.0.0	24 January 702	Yuknoom Took' K'awiil	Calakmul	Mexico	Portrait of the wife of the monarch.	
Stela 24		9.13.10.0.0	24 January 702	Yuknoom Took' K'awiil	Calakmul	Mexico	Portrait of the monarch.	
Stela 25				Bolon K'awiil I	Calakmul	Mexico		
Stela 26					Calakmul	Mexico		
Stela 27					Calakmul	Mexico		
Stela 28		9.9.10.0.0	19 March 623	Tajoom Ukʼab Kʼahkʼ	Calakmul	Mexico	Stelae that are the earliest monuments to survive from Late Classic Calakmul. They depict a royal couple but the texts are too poorly preserved to reveal their names.	
Stela 29		9.9.10.0.0	19 March 623	Tajoom Ukʼab Kʼahkʼ	Calakmul	Mexico	Stelae that are the earliest monuments to survive from Late Classic Calakmul. They depict a royal couple but the texts are too poorly preserved to reveal their names.	
Stela 30				Yuknoom Ch'een II	Calakmul	Mexico		
Stela 31				Yuknoom Ch'een II	Calakmul	Mexico		
Stela 32				Yuknoom Ch'een II	Calakmul	Mexico		
Stela 33		9.11.5.0.0	16 September 657	Yuknoom Ch'een II	Calakmul	Mexico	The stela records an event in the reign of Uneh Chan, who may have been the monarch's father. The event was celebrated in 593.	
Stela 34				Yuknoom Ch'een II	Calakmul	Mexico		
Stela 35		9.11.8.0.0 (front); 9.11.10.0.0 (back)	27 March 661 (front); 21 August 662 (back)	Yuknoom Ch'een II	Calakmul	Mexico		
Stela 36				Yuknoom Ch'een II	Calakmul	Mexico		
Stela 37				Yuknoom Ch'een II	Calakmul	Mexico		
Stela 38				Yuknoom Took' K'awiil	Calakmul	Mexico		
Stela 39				Yuknoom Took' K'awiil	Calakmul	Mexico		
Stela 40				Yuknoom Took' K'awiil	Calakmul	Mexico		
Stela 41				Yuknoom Took' K'awiil	Calakmul	Mexico		
Stela 42				Yuknoom Took' K'awiil	Calakmul	Mexico		
Stela 43		9.3.19.17.14	10 October 514		Calakmul	Mexico	The text is in the stela is damaged but carries an early spelling of the k'uhul chatan winik non-royal noble title used in Calakmul and the Mirador Basin.	
Stela 50					Calakmul	Mexico	One of the last monuments erected during the final decline of the city. It bears a crude, clumsily executed portrait.	
Stela 51			731	Yuknoom Took' K'awiil	Calakmul	Mexico	Best preserved monument at Calakmul.	
Stela 52			731	Yuknoom Took' K'awiil	Calakmul	Mexico		
Stela 53			731	Yuknoom Took' K'awiil	Calakmul	Mexico		
Stela 54			731	Yuknoom Took' K'awiil	Calakmul	Mexico	Portrait of a wife of Yuknoom Took' K'awiil.	
Stela 55				Yuknoom Took' K'awiil	Calakmul	Mexico		
Stela 57			771	Bolon K'awiil II	Calakmul	Mexico	The two stelae form a pair.	
Stela 58			771	Bolon K'awiil II	Calakmul	Mexico	The two stelae form a pair.	
Stela 59				Bolon K'awiil I	Calakmul	Mexico		
Stela 60				Bolon K'awiil I	Calakmul	Mexico		
Stela 61			899 or 909	Aj Took'	Calakmul	Mexico	It is a stunted stela with a badly eroded portrait and a shortened date	
Stela 62			751	Great Serpent	Calakmul	Mexico		
Stela 68				Great Serpent	Calakmul	Mexico		
Stela 70				Yuknoom Took' K'awiil	Calakmul	Mexico		
Stela 71				Yuknoom Took' K'awiil	Calakmul	Mexico		
Stela 72				Yuknoom Took' K'awiil	Calakmul	Mexico		
Stela 73				Yuknoom Took' K'awiil	Calakmul	Mexico		
Stela 74				Yuknoom Took' K'awiil	Calakmul	Mexico		
Stela 75		9.12.0.0.0	29 June 672	Yuknoom Ch'een II	Calakmul	Mexico		
Stela 76			633	Yuknoom Head	Calakmul	Mexico	This stela pairs with Stela 78	
Stela 77				Yuknoom Ch'een II	Calakmul	Mexico		
Stela 78				Yuknoom Head	Calakmul	Mexico	This stela pairs with Stela 76.	
Stela 79		9.12.0.0.0	29 June 672	Yuknoom Ch'een II	Calakmul	Mexico		
Stela 84			10th-century		Calakmul	Mexico	This stela is one of the last monuments erected at Calakmul and bears an inscription that is an illiterate imitation of writing.	
Stela 85				Yuknoom Ch'een II	Calakmul	Mexico		
Stela 86				Yuknoom Ch'een II	Calakmul	Mexico		
Stela 87				Yuknoom Ch'een II	Calakmul	Mexico		
Stela 88				Great Serpent	Calakmul	Mexico	Probably paired with Stela 62. Portrait a queen, albeit unknown. B'olon K'awiil also appears to be mentioned on the stela	
Stela 89				Yuknoom Took' K'awiil	Calakmul	Mexico		
Stela 91			10th-century		Calakmul	Mexico	Like Stela 84, this stela bears an inscription that is a meaningless imitation of hieroglyphic writing.	
Stela 93				Yuknoom Ch'een II	Calakmul	Mexico		
Stela 94				Yuknoom Ch'een II	Calakmul	Mexico		
Stela 114		8.19.15.12.13	14 September 431		Calakmul	Mexico	The stela has a long hieroglyphic text that has resisted translation but probably commemorates a royal enthronement in 411.	
Stela 115		9.12.10.0.0	8 May 682	Yuknoom Ch'een II	Calakmul	Mexico		
Stela 116		9.12.10.0.0	8 May 682	Yuknoom Ch'een II	Calakmul	Mexico		
Lintel 3			799	Tajal Chan Ahk	Cancuén	Guatemala	Portrait of the monarch.	
Stela 1		9.8.0.0.0	28 August 593	K'an II or Yajaw Teʼ Kʼinich II	Caracol	Belize	Potentially posthumous monument erected by Kan II, to solidify his rule by referring to Lord Water (but not his predecessor Knot Ahau) or by Yajaw Te’ K’inich I, along with Altar 1 to mark the 9.8.0.0.0 K’atun ending (AD 593). It was found standing and unfragmented.	
Stela 2					Caracol	Belize	Fragmented into seven pieces, only the top portion was found.	
Stela 3		9.11.0.0.0	13 October 652	K'an II	Caracol	Belize	Possible portrait of Lady Batz’ Ek’, who may have been the monarch's mother and/or have served as his regent. The text mentions two arrivals at different dates (probably hers?) at 9.7.10.16.8 and again at 9.9.9.10.5 (although the presence of two arrivals is not thoroughly explained), and proves that she was foreign to Caracol. The stela also references the monarch's accession in 618 and also his 1st penis perforation at age 5 under the direction of his father, Yajaw Teʼ Kʼinich II (Lord Water).Found broken in two major fragments.	
Stela 4		9.7.10.0.0	17 October 583	Yajaw Teʼ Kʼinich II	Caracol	Belize	Portrait of the monarch.	
Stela 5		9.9.0.0.0	10 May 613	Knot Ajaw	Caracol	Belize	Celebration of the 9th K’atun ending. Portrait of the monarch, holding the ceremonial bar, surrounded by open portals with emerging named ancestors.	
Stela 6		9.8.10.0.0	2 July 603	Knot Ajaw	Caracol	Belize	First stela erected by this monarch. Originally had over 144 glyphs, and depicted twin portraits of the monarch and his father, Yajaw Teʼ Kʼinich II. It also makes note of Lord Chekaj K’inich who also carries the Caracol emblem glyph, and may be the younger brother of Lord Water (Yajaw Te’ K’inich).	
Stela 7		9.10.0.0.0	26 January 633	Kʼan II	Caracol	Belize		
Stela 8		9.19.0.0.0	26 June 810		Caracol	Belize	Badly eroded stela, the only semi-legible text being a date.	
Stela 9		[9.18.0.0.0 – 10.0.0.0.0]	[9 October 790 – 13 March 830]		Caracol	Belize		
Stela 10		10.1.10.0.0	7 October 859	Ruler 13 of Caracol	Caracol	Belize	The stela displays a glyphic text on one face, making it unusual in the Caracol corpus.	
Stela 11		9.18.10.0.0	17 August 800	K’inich Joy Kawiil	Caracol	Belize	The text in the stela suggests that Tum Yohl K’inich is the monarch's father, or potentially a related high-ranking military leader	
Stela 12					Caracol	Belize	The stela was devoid of any carving, and entirely plain. While this may be an uncarved monument, it is also likely that erosion destroyed any carving that may have once been present.	
Stela 13		9.4.0.0.0	16 October 514	Yajaw Teʼ Kʼinich I	Caracol	Belize	The iconography on the front closely resembles that of Stela 16, and the back contains enough legible glyphs that date the monument. This date makes it the second oldest stela at the site, and confirms the existence of a royal dynasty at Caracol. The iconography is standard Early Classic, with the monarch holding the ceremonial bar while wearing a god mask.	
Stela 14		9.6.0.0.0	20 March 554	Yajaw Teʼ Kʼinich II	Caracol	Belize	Celebration of the K’atun ending.It was originally thought to be uncarved when first discovered, yet it is actually finely incised and depicts the monarch seated holding the ceremonial bar over a 42 block glyphic text.	
Stela 15		9.7.0.0.0	5 December 573		Caracol	Belize	It is primarily glyphic, although there are small and eroded figures at the top of the monument. It records the accession of Kʼan I and a ch’ak (axe) event against Caracol by the Snake polity and Tikal	
Stela 16		9.5.0.0.0	3 July 534	Kʼan I	Caracol	Belize	The stela is well preserved, and depicts the monarch with the ceremonial bar standing above three smaller seated figures which appear below the ground line. The text of the stela gives a genealogy and includes: the monarch's grandfather, Kʼahkʼ Ujol Kʼinich I; a royal woman from Xultun; and both of the monarch's parents. Bahlam Nehn of Copán is also mentioned, his appearance is however unclear.	
Stela 17		10.1.0.0.0	28 November 849	K’an III	Caracol	Belize	The stela depicts two seated lords facing each other and accompanied by glyphic texts, dating to AD 849. Originally it seems that there was also carving on the sides, with four large cartouches on each side presumably with one large glyph block in each, although these are now eroded and illegible.	
Stela 18		9.19.0.0.0	26 June 810	K’inich Toobil Yopaat	Caracol	Belize	Celebration of the end of the 19th K’atun. The stela is badly eroded, but shows a full figured vision serpent over the body of a bound captive.	
Stela 19		9.19.10.0.0	4 May 820	K’inich Toobil Yopaat	Caracol	Belize	Once the tallest stela at Caracol, it is now broken into several eroded fragments. Only six glyph blocks partially remain on the front, which while eroded, clearly shows the outline of a ruler holding the ceremonial bar. Each side of the monument displayed two cartouches with four glyph blocks each, although those on the left side are broken and eroded. The legible text on the right side seems to be a continuation of the text on the left side, and begins with a glyph that resembles the Site Q (La Corona) emblem. The text also references the two Paddler Gods, who were ‘seen’ by the monarch.	
Stela 20					Caracol	Belize	Only the upper portion of the Stela is known, and depicts two facing seated individuals with two eroded glyphic text in between. In the upper left corner appear the jaws of what Beetz and Satterthwaite describe as a serpent. It gives a date of what is likely an accession, but neither the date nor the ruler's name are included.	
Stela 21		9.13.10.0.0	24 January 702	Ruler 7 of Caracol	Caracol	Belize	Portrait of the monarch, shown with a kneeling captive identified as a k’uhul ajaw (holy lord) of Ixkun, although his name glyph is also illegible. The top left portion of the stela is broken off, and the lowest row of glyph blocks have broken off and eroded.	
Stela 22		9.10.0.0.0	25 January 633	K'an II	Caracol	Belize	The stela once had a hieroglyphic text which covered the entire face of the monument; this text is now badly eroded. Two small figures were carved on the top corners of the monument, sitting crossed legged facing each other. The surviving text relates events from the reign of this monarch. Importantly, the stela relates the arrival date of Lady Batz’ Ek’ to Caracol at 9.9.9.10.5. (10 October 622). This date is also associated with an event with a ruler of Site Q (La Corona), leading Grubeto suggest that this indicates that Batz’ Ek’ was a woman from Site Q who helped establish an alliance between the two centers. This alliance eventually led to the combined defeat of Naranjo, which is mentioned later in the legible text.	
Stela 23			[361–420]		Caracol	Belize	No iconography exists, and only a small amount of text survives. Shows a date that falls between AD 361 and AD 420 and references yajaw te’, which may be referencing a recurring royal name: Yajaw Te’ K’inich	
Stela 24					Caracol	Belize	Only a small portion of the original carving exists; no glyphic text. It depicts a monarch below the waist, and a jaguarian figure emerging from a serpentine mouth. A second figure appears on the left, but only a hand is still visible.	
Stela			700		Caribe, El	Mexico	Portrait of a monarch with a captive.	
Stela 1					Cayo, El	Mexico	Portrait of a monarch.	
Stela 2					Cayo, El	Mexico	Portrait of a monarch with a servant?	
Lintel 1					Cayo, El	Mexico	Portrait of a monarch; Hieroglyphic text	
Panel		9.16.13.5.14	21 June 764		Cayo, El	Mexico	A monarch performing a ceremony.	
Panel					Cayo, El	Mexico	Portrait of a monarch; Hieroglyphic text	
Panel					Cayo, El	Mexico	Portrait of two rulers.	
Stela 1			869	Wa'tul Chatel	Ceibal, El	Guatemala	The stela names someone called "Knife-Wing", who is also known at distant Chichen Itzá.	
Stela 2			870	Wa'tul Chatel	Ceibal, El	Guatemala	Broken and restored. It depicts the frontal view of a masked figure and is the only monument at El Ceibal to show a frontal portrayal.	
Stela 3					Ceibal, El	Guatemala	The stela bears a non-Maya calendrical date, one of the glyphs is cipactli, a crocodile head used to represent the first day of the 260-day calendar in central Mexico.	
Stela 4					Ceibal, El	Guatemala	The stela was lost for sixty years before being rediscovered.	
Stela 5			780		Ceibal, El	Guatemala	The broken middle section of the stela is all that is left, and it bears the representation of a ballplayer.	
Stela 6					Ceibal, El	Guatemala	Hieroglyphic text.	
Stela 7		9.18.10.0.0	17 August 800		Ceibal, El	Guatemala	Portrait of a monarch dressed as a ballplayer. The monument also records the accession of a king of Seibal in 771.	
Stela 8				Wa'tul Chatel	Ceibal, El	Guatemala	Portrait of the monarch, who wears jaguar claws on his hands and feet, together with other attributes of the Bearded Jaguar God.In one hand the king holds the head of the god K'awiil. The text describes a visitor named Hakawitzil, an early form of Jacawitz, the name of one of the patron gods of the Postclassic K'iche' Kingdom of Q'umarkaj in the Guatemalan Highlands. Schele and Mathews propose that the event depicted on this stela gave rise to the foundation legends of the K'iche' people.	
Stela 9				Wa'tul Chatel	Ceibal, El	Guatemala	The stela was damaged and one section is missing. It depicts the monarch with the attributes of the Maize God and describes him invoking the Vision Serpent.	
Stela 10				Wa'tul Chatel	Ceibal, El	Guatemala	Portrait of the monarch, dressed in Terminal Classic Maya style, although his foreign-looking face bears a moustache, which is not a typically Mayan characteristic. The text on this stela displays the emblem glyphs of Tikal, Calakmul and Motul de San José, describing how he received visitors from those cities. Among the visitors are named Kan-Pet of Calakmul and Kan Ek' of Motul. Wat'ul Chatel wears a headdress associated with the patron gods of Seibal, the heron god and K'awiil, deities that were also the patrons of Palenque. This appears to be an attempt by this foreign king to identify himself more closely with the city he came to rule.<	
Stela 11		10.0.0.0.1	14 March 830	Wa'tul Chatel	Ceibal, El	Guatemala	The stela has text that describes the refounding of Seibal on 14 March 830 and the installation of its new lord, Wat'ul Chatel, as a vassal of Chan Ek' Hopet of Ucanal.A panel beneath the portrait of the ruler depicts a bound captive. The hieroglyphic inscription describes how Wat'ul Chatel arrived with his palanquins and his patron deities.	
Stela 12					Ceibal, El	Guatemala		
Stela 13			870	Wa'tul Chatel	Ceibal, El	Guatemala		
Stela 14			870	Wa'tul Chatel	Ceibal, El	Guatemala	Bears stylistic similarities with sculptures at distant Chichen Itzá in the extreme north of the Yucatán Peninsula.	
Stela 18					Ceibal, El	Guatemala	One of the last stelae to be erected in the city	
Stela 19					Ceibal, El	Guatemala	The stela demonstrates the foreign influences prevalent at Seibal during the Late Classic. It depicts a lord wearing a mask representing the central Mexican wind god Ehecatl.	
Stela 20			889	Wa'tul Chatel	Ceibal, El	Guatemala	Portrait of the monarch. One of the last stelae to be erected in the city.	
Stela 21				Wa'tul Chatel	Ceibal, El	Guatemala	Damaged and restored, the stela depicts the monarch bearing a manikin sceptre, and wearing attributes of the Bearded Jaguar God, although without the jaguar claws. The king holds a K'awiil sceptre raised in his right hand, from his other hand hangs a shield with the face of the sun god. The inscription on the monument is largely illegible.	
Panel					Ceibal, El	Guatemala	Hieroglyphic text.	
Stela 12		9.16.0.0.0	7 May 751		Chactún	Mexico		
Stela 17		9.15.0.0.0	20 August 731		Chactún	Mexico		
Stela 18		9.15.0.0.0	20 August 731		Chactún	Mexico	Portrait of a monarch on both sides of the stela.	
Stela 19					Chactún	Mexico		
Stela 3					Chal, El	Guatemala	Portrait of a monarch	
Stela 4					Chal, El	Guatemala	Portrait of a monarch in a ceremony.	
Stela 5					Chal, El	Guatemala	Portrait of a monarch	
Stela 7					Chal, El	Guatemala		
Stela 8					Chal, El	Guatemala		
Stela 2		7.16.3.2.13	6 December 36 BCE		Chiapa de Corzo	Mexico	This stela bears the earliest Mesoamerican Long Count calendar date yet found.	
Lintel 1					Chicozapote, El	Mexico	A portrait of a seated lord.	
Lintel 2					Chicozapote, El	Mexico	A portrait of a seated lord.	
Lintel 3					Chicozapote, El	Mexico	A portrait of two seated lords.	
Lintel 4					Chicozapote, El	Mexico	A portrait of a seated lord.	
Stela 1					Chinkultic	Mexico	Portraits of unknown monarchs	
Stela 8					Chinkultic	Mexico	Portraits of unknown monarchs	
Stela 1		9.12.0.0.0 (front); 9.12.10.5.12 (back)	29 June 672 (front); 28 August 682 (back)	Lady K'awiil Ek' (front); Chan Yopaat (back)	Cobá	Mexico	In Face 1, there's a portrait of Lady K'awiil Ajaw; In Face 2, there's a portrait of Chan Yopaat.	
Stela 2		9.10.10.0.0	4 December 642	Lady K'awiil Ek'	Cobá	Mexico		
Stela 3		9.10.0.0.0	25 January 633	Sihyaj Chan K'awiil	Cobá	Mexico		
Stela 4		9.9.10.0.0 or 9.11.0.0.0	19 March 623 or 12 October 652	Sihyaj Chan K'awiil or Lady K'awiil Ek'	Cobá	Mexico	The stela may represent, according to some authors, the wife of Sihyaj Chan K'awiil, or Lady K'awiil Ek', according to others.	
Stela 5		9.11.10.0	21 August 662	Lady K'awiil Ek'	Cobá	Mexico	Portraits of the monarch and her husband on both sides of the stela.	
Stela 6		9.9.10.0.0	19 March 623	Sihyaj Chan K'awiil	Cobá	Mexico	Depicts a commemoration.	
Stela 8					Cobá	Mexico	Portraits of unknown monarchs. Stela 11 only shows the upper portion of a monarch's portrait.	
Stela 9					Cobá	Mexico	Portraits of unknown monarchs. Stela 11 only shows the upper portion of a monarch's portrait.	
Stela 10					Cobá	Mexico	Portraits of unknown monarchs. Stela 11 only shows the upper portion of a monarch's portrait.	
Stela 11					Cobá	Mexico	Portraits of unknown monarchs. Stela 11 only shows the upper portion of a monarch's portrait.	
Stela 12					Cobá	Mexico	Portraits of unknown monarchs. Stela 11 only shows the upper portion of a monarch's portrait.	
Stela 13					Cobá	Mexico	Portraits of unknown monarchs. Stela 11 only shows the upper portion of a monarch's portrait.	
Stela 15					Cobá	Mexico	Portraits of unknown monarchs. Stela 11 only shows the upper portion of a monarch's portrait.	
Stela 16					Cobá	Mexico	A stela with text only.	
Stela 17					Cobá	Mexico		
Stela 18					Cobá	Mexico	A stela with text only.	
Stela 19					Cobá	Mexico		
Stela 20		9.17.2.0.5 (front); 9.17.10.0.0 (back)	16 January 773 (front); 30 November 780 (back)	Chan K'inich	Cobá	Mexico	Portraits of the ruler at his ascension to the throne (773), and in a commemoration (780).	
Stela 21					Cobá	Mexico	Portraits of unknown monarchs.	
Stela 22					Cobá	Mexico	Portraits of unknown monarchs.	
Stela 23					Cobá	Mexico	Portraits of unknown monarchs.	
Stela 29		9.7.5.0.0 or 9.10.18.0.0	9 November 578 or 23 October 650	Lady Ch'ak Ch'een or Lady K'awiil Ek'	Cobá	Mexico		
Stela 30				Lady Ch'ak Ch'een	Cobá	Mexico		
Panel 4					Cobá	Mexico	Portrait.	
Panel 6					Cobá	Mexico	Portrait.	
Stela 1					Comitán	Mexico	Portrait of a monarch.	
Stela 1				Chan Imix K'awiil	Copán	Honduras	Portrait of the monarch.	
Stela 2			652	Chan Imix K'awiil	Copán	Honduras	Portrait of the monarch.	
Stela 3			652	Chan Imix K'awiil	Copán	Honduras	Portrait of the monarch.	
Stela 4		9.14.15.0.0	17 September 726	Uaxaclajuun Ub'aah K'awiil	Copán	Honduras	Inscription records very early event involving the patron gods of the city on 8.6.0.0.0 (19 December 159 AD) and links them to a reenactment of those events by the monarch who erected the stela.	
Stela 5		9.9.14.11.0	4 October 627	Chan Imix K'awiil	Copán	Honduras	Portrait of the monarch.	
Stela 6				Chan Imix K'awiil	Copán	Honduras		
Stela 7		9.9.0.0.0	10 May 613	K'ak' Chan Yopaat or B'utz' Chan	Copán	Honduras	Celebration of a K'atun-ending ceremony. It bears a long hieroglyphic text that has been only partially deciphered.	
Stela 8				Yax Pasaj Chan Yopaat	Copán	Honduras		
Stela 9			564	Tzi-Bahlam	Copán	Honduras	Portrait of the monarch.	
Stela 10				Chan Imix K'awiil	Copán	Honduras	Portrait of the monarch.	
Stela 11		9.19.10.0.0	4 May 820	Yax Pasaj Chan Yopaat	Copán	Honduras	The stela was originally an interior column from Temple 18, the monarch's funerary shrine. It portrays the monarch as the elderly Maya maize god and has imagery that seems to deliberately parallel the tomb lid of the Palenque king K'inich Janaab' Pakal, probably because of Yax Pasaj Chan Yopaat's close family ties to that city. The text of the column formed part of a longer text carved onto the interior walls of the temple and may describe the downfall of the Copán dynasty.	
Stela 12			652	Chan Imix K'awiil	Copán	Honduras	Portrait of the monarch.	
Stela 13			652	Chan Imix K'awiil	Copán	Honduras	Portrait of the monarch.	
Stela 15			524	B'alam Nehn	Copán	Honduras	Its sculpture consists entirely of hieroglyphic text, which mentions that the monarch was ruling the city by AD 504.	
Stela 16					Copán	Honduras		
Stela 17			554	Tzi-Bahlam	Copán	Honduras	Portrait of the monarch.	
Stela 18				K'inich Popol Hol	Copán	Honduras	A fragment of a monument bearing the name of the monarch.	
Stela 19		9.10.19.15.0	13 August 652	Chan Imix K'awiil	Copán	Honduras	Portrait of the monarch.	
Stela 20					Copán	Honduras		
Stela 21					Copán	Honduras		
Stela 22					Copán	Honduras		
Stela 23				Chan Imix K'awiil	Copán	Honduras		
Stela 29				Yax Pasaj Chan Yopaat	Copán	Honduras		
Stela 34				Ku Ix	Copán	Honduras	Portrait of the monarch.	
Stela 63			435	K'inich Popol Hol or K'inich Yax K'uk' Mo'	Copán	Honduras	The stela's sculpture consists purely of finely carved hieroglyphic texts and it is possible that it was originally commissioned with additional texts added to the sides of the monument. The stela was deliberately broken, together with its hieroglyphic step, during the ritual demolishing of the Papagayo phase of Temple 26.	
Stela A		9.15.0.3.0.	19 October 731	Uaxaclajuun Ub'aah K'awiil	Copán	Honduras	The stela places his rulership among the four most powerful kingdoms in the Maya region, alongside Palenque, Tikal and Calakmul.	
Stela B			8th century	Uaxaclajuun Ub'aah K'awiil	Copán	Honduras	Portrait of the monarch.	
Stela C			8th century	Uaxaclajuun Ub'aah K'awiil	Copán	Honduras	Portrait of the monarch.	
Stela D		9.15.5.0.0	24 July 736	Uaxaclajuun Ub'aah K'awiil	Copán	Honduras	Portrait of the monarch.	
Stela E		9.5.10.0.0	11 May 544	Uaxaclajuun Ub'aah K'awiil	Copán	Honduras	Portrait of the monarch.	
Stela F		9.14.10.0.2	13 October 721	Uaxaclajuun Ub'aah K'awiil	Copán	Honduras	Portrait of the monarch.	
Stela G			8th-century	Uaxaclajuun Ub'aah K'awiil	Copán	Honduras	Portrait of the monarch.	
Stela H		9.14.19.5.0	5 December 730	Uaxaclajuun Ub'aah K'awiil	Copán	Honduras	Portrait of the monarch.	
Stela I		8.6.0.0.0; 8.6.0.10.8	16 December 159 CE; 11 July 160 CE		Copán	Honduras		
Stela J		9.13.3.6.8	7 July 695	Uaxaclajuun Ub'aah K'awiil	Copán	Honduras	This stela was first monument of the monarch's reign.	
Stela M			756	K'ak' Yipyaj Chan K'awiil	Copán	Honduras	Portraits of the monarch.	
Stela N			761	K'ak' Yipyaj Chan K'awiil	Copán	Honduras	Portraits of the monarch.	
Stela P			623	K'ak' Chan Yopaat	Copán	Honduras	Hieroglyphic text.	
Element 19					Corona, La	Guatemala	Portrait of a queen.	
Stela 1					Corona, La	Guatemala	Hieroglyphic text.	
Panel 1		9.12.5.7.4	25 October 677	K'inich Yook	Corona, La	Guatemala		
Panel 6		9.14.19.17.18	18 August 731		Corona, La	Guatemala	Arrival of two princesses from Calakmul to La Corona.	
Stela					Corozal (Santa Rita)	Guatemala	Portrait of K'inich Muwaan Jol, King of Tikal.	
Stela 1					Cozumel	Mexico	Portrait of a lord.	
Stela 2					Cozumel	Mexico	Depiction of Chaak, the god of the rain.	
Stela 1					Dos Caobas	Guatemala	Portrait of a monarch and a captive.	
Stela 2					Dos Caobas	Guatemala	Portrait of a monarch and a servant.	
Stela 3			736	Ucha'an K'in Bahlam	Dos Pilas	Guatemala	Portrait of the monarch.	
Stela 5				Ucha'an K'in Bahlam	Dos Pilas	Guatemala		
Stela 8					Dos Pilas	Guatemala	Hieroglyphic text describing the life of Itzamnaaj K'awiil	
Stela 16			736	Ucha'an K'in Bahlam	Dos Pilas	Guatemala	Portrait of Yich'aak Bahlam of El Ceibal.	
Lintel 19				K'awiil Chan K'inich	Dos Pilas	Guatemala		
Stela 9					Dzibilchaltun	Guatemala	Portrait of a monarch.	
Stela 19					Dzibilchaltun	Guatemala	Portrait of a monarch.	
Stela 1		9.14.9.17.19	10 October 721		Edzna	Mexico		
Stela 2		9.15.0.0.0	20 August 731		Edzna	Mexico		
Stela 3		9.14.0.0.0	3 December 711		Edzna	Mexico		
Stela 5			790		Edzna	Mexico		
Stela 6		10.1.0.0.0	28 November 849		Edzna	Mexico		
Stela 9			810		Edzna	Mexico		
Stela 18		9.12.0.0.0 (front); 9.13.0.0.0 (back)	29 June 672 (front); 16 March 692 (back)		Edzna	Mexico		
Stela 20		9.16.6.5.0	14 July 757		Edzna	Mexico		
Stela 21		9.11.10.0.0	21 August 662		Edzna	Mexico		
Stela 22		9.11.0.0.0	12 October 652		Edzna	Mexico		
Stela 23		9.10.0.0.0	25 January 633		Edzna	Mexico		
Stela				Ukit Kan Leʼk Tokʼ	Ek' Balam	Mexico	Portrait of the monarch	
Stela 1					Encanto, El	Mexico	Portraits of K'inich Ehb and Sihyaj Chan K'awiil, kings of Tikal.	
Stela 1		9.18.0.0.0	9 October 790		Florida, La	Guatemala	Portrait of a monarch.	
Stela 5					Florida, La	Guatemala	Portrait of a monarch.	
Stela 6		9.11.0.0.0	12 October 652		Florida, La	Guatemala		
Stela 7		9.16.15.0.0	17 February 766	Ka'hk Chan Yopaat	Florida, La	Guatemala	Portrait of the monarch.	
Stela 8		9.12.5.0.0	3 June 677	Bahlam K'awiil	Florida, La	Guatemala		
Stela 9		9.15.0.0.0	20 August 731	Ka'hk Chan Yopaat	Florida, La	Guatemala	Portrait of the monarch's mother, Lady Chaak, performing a ritual.	
Stela 16		9.17.15.0.0	4 November 785		Florida, La	Guatemala	Portrait of a queen, probably an elderly Lady Chaak.	
Stela 1					Honradez, La	Guatemala	Portrait of a monarch (given the long skirt, probably a queen).	
Stela 2					Honradez, La	Guatemala	Lower fragment of the stela, with only a visible foot, and hieroglyphic text.	
Stela 3					Honradez, La	Guatemala	Badly preserved portrait of a monarch.	
Stela 4					Honradez, La	Guatemala	Portrait of a monarch.	
Stela 5					Honradez, La	Guatemala	Portrait of a monarch.	
Stela 6					Honradez, La	Guatemala	Portrait of a monarch.	
Stela 7					Honradez, La	Guatemala	Portrait of a monarch.	
Stela 9					Honradez, La	Guatemala	Fragment with hieroglyphic text.	
Stela 3					Horcones, Los	Guatemala		
Lintel 1					Ikil	Mexico		
Lintel 2					Ikil	Mexico		
Stela 1					Itzimte	Mexico	Portraits of unknown monarchs.	
Stela 3					Itzimte	Mexico	Portraits of unknown monarchs.	
Stela 4					Itzimte	Mexico	Portraits of unknown monarchs.	
Stela 5					Itzimte	Mexico	Portraits of unknown monarchs.	
Stela 6					Itzimte	Mexico	Portraits of unknown monarchs.	
Stela 7					Itzimte	Mexico	Portraits of unknown monarchs.	
Stela 8					Itzimte	Mexico	Portraits of unknown monarchs.	
Stela 9					Itzimte	Mexico	Portraits of unknown monarchs.	
Stela 10					Itzimte	Mexico	Portraits of unknown monarchs.	
Stela 11					Itzimte	Mexico	Portraits of unknown monarchs.	
Stela 12					Itzimte	Mexico	Portraits of unknown monarchs.	
Lintel 1					Itzimte	Mexico	Portraits of unknown monarchs.	
Stela 1		9.18.0.0.0	11 October 790	Rabbit God K	Ixkun	Guatemala	The stela bears the images of the monarch and another visiting king, Ch'iyel of Sacul. The text of suggests that Rabbit God K's mother, Lady Ik, was originally from another city named as Akbal, which has yet to be identified.	
Stela 2				Eight Skull	Ixkun	Guatemala	Records two battles, one against Sacul on 21 December 779 and the other against Ucanal on 10 May 780. The text names Eight Skull, the predecessor of Rabbit God K. The text is incomplete but this ruler has been nicknamed "Eight Skull" by epigraphers, and he is believed to have dedicated the monument.	
Stela 3				Rabbit God K	Ixkun	Guatemala	Only the upper half of the stela remains. The monument is badly eroded and it lacks any surviving hieroglyphic text; it is sculpted with the image of a ruler facing towards the left, the figure is bearing a God K sceptre, one of the symbols of rulership. Possibly dedicated by Rabbit God K.	
Stela 4				Rabbit God K	Ixkun	Guatemala	The stela bears ruler wielding a God K sceptre; a war captive is depicted underneath the ruler's image.Due to the similarity of the ruler's image and the similar dating to Stela 1, Stela 4 is believed to have been dedicated by Rabbit God K.	
Stela 5			c.800	Rabbit God K	Ixkun	Guatemala	The main figure on the stela is depicted carrying a staff of rulership in the left hand while the right hand scatters drops of blood or some other substance. The ruler is depicted wearing an elaborate feathered headdress in the form of the head of a jaguar or a puma. The ruler is richly decorated with jewellery including earspools, necklace and a chest ornament.	
Stela 8					Ixkun	Guatemala		
Stela 10					Ixkun	Guatemala		
Stela 12				Eight Skull	Ixkun	Guatemala	The stela may have been reused in the construction of the final phase of Structure 10 It bears a hieroglyphic text divided into two columns, but, unfortunately, the text is too eroded to be read with precision.	
Stela 1			879		Ixlu	Guatemala		
Stela 2					Ixlu	Guatemala	Portrait of a monarch.	
Stela 2					Ixtonton	Guatemala	Portrait of a monarch.	
Stela 1				Aj Yaxjal B’aak	Ixtutz	Guatemala	Portrait of a monarch.	
Stela 2				Aj Yaxjal B’aak	Ixtutz	Guatemala	Portrait of a monarch.	
Stela 3				Aj Yaxjal B’aak	Ixtutz	Guatemala	Portrait of a monarch.	
Stela 4		9.17.9.17.18	28 November 780	Aj Yaxjal B’aak	Ixtutz	Guatemala	Hieroglyphic inscriptions.	
Stela 5					Ixtutz	Guatemala		
Stela 6					Ixtutz	Guatemala		
Stela 7					Ixtutz	Guatemala		
Panel 1					Ixtutz	Guatemala	Only fragments remain of the panel.	
Stela 1					Izapa	Guatemala	Mythological scenes.	
Stela 2					Izapa	Guatemala	Mythological scenes.	
Stela 5					Izapa	Guatemala	Mythological scenes.	
Stela 21					Izapa	Guatemala	Mythological scenes.	
Stela 25					Izapa	Guatemala	Mythological scenes.	
Stela 50					Izapa	Guatemala	Mythological scenes.	
Stela 1					Jimbal	Guatemala	Portrait of a monarch.	
Stela 1			485	Chan Ahk	Joyanca, La	Guatemala	Portrait of a monarch.	
Jamb					Kabah	Mexico	Portrait of a monarch.	
Stela					Kaminaljuyu	Guatemala	Portrait of a monarch.	
Lintel 1		9.15.15.0.0	1 June 743	Knot-Eye Jaguar	Lacanha	Mexico	Portrait of a monarch.	
Stela 1		9.15.5.1.14	27 August 736		Laxtunich	Guatemala	Portrait of a monarch.	
Panel 1					Laxtunich	Guatemala	Portrait of a monarch.	
Stela 2				Aj Ho' Baak	Machaquila	Guatemala		
Stela 3				Sihyaj K'in Ich’aak II	Machaquila	Guatemala	Portrait of the monarch.	
Stela 4				Sihyaj K'in Ich’aak II	Machaquila	Guatemala		
Stela 5				Juun Tsak-Took	Machaquila	Guatemala		
Stela 6				Juun Tsak-Took	Machaquila	Guatemala		
Stela 7				Juun Tsak-Took	Machaquila	Guatemala		
Stela 8				Juun Tsak-Took	Machaquila	Guatemala		
Stela 10				Ets'nab Chaak	Machaquila	Guatemala		
Stela 11				Ets'nab Chaak	Machaquila	Guatemala		
Stela 12				Ets'nab Chaak	Machaquila	Guatemala		
Stela 13				Sihyaj K'in Ich'aak I	Machaquila	Guatemala		
Stela 18				Chaak Bahlam	Machaquila	Guatemala		
Stela 1					Mar, La	Mexico	Portrait of a monarch.	
Stela 2					Mar, La	Mexico	Portrait of a monarch.	
Stela 2					Mirador, El	Guatemala	Hieroglyphic text	
Stela 2					Montura, La	Guatemala	Hieroglyphic text	
Stela 1			756	Wochan K'awiil	Moral Reforma	Mexico	Portrait of the monarch	
Stela 2			711		Moral Reforma	Mexico	Portrait of a monarch with a captive.	
Stela 1			8th century		Motul de San José	Guatemala	A text describing an accession to the throne of a monarch under supervision of Jasaw Chan K'awiil I of Tikal	
Stela 2				Yajaw Te' K'inich	Motul de San José	Guatemala	Portrait of the king; the stela also depicts dancing figures on its east face. On its west face it depicts a figure sculpted using the so-called X-ray style found on Ik-style ceramics, which depicts the face in profile wearing a mask that has been cut away to show the face underneath.	
Stela 3					Motul de San José	Guatemala		
Stela 4				Yajaw Te' K'inich	Motul de San José	Guatemala	The stela shows king Yajawte' K'inich performing a dance, with one foot raised	
Stela 5					Motul de San José	Guatemala	Stela with hieroglyphic inscriptions.	
Stela 6					Motul de San José	Guatemala	The stela was fragmented and then pieced together in part; it shows the portrait of a monarch of the city dressed in rich clothing and regalia. The figure was positioned performing a dance, with one foot half lifted off the ground. In his right hand the ruler held a God K sceptre. It is dated to the Late Postclassic period.	
Stela 18		9.11.0.0.0 or 9.15.10.0.0	12 October 652 or 28 June 741		Naachtun	Guatemala	Portrait of a female monarch (possibly wife of the monarch on stela 19), standing above a captive from Calakmul.	
Stela 19					Naachtun	Guatemala	Portrait of a monarch	
Stela 26				Kʼan Chitam of Tikal	Naachtun	Guatemala	Portrait of Lady Tzutz, the monarch's wife.	
Stela 1				Kʼakʼ Tiliw Chan Chaak	Naranjo	Guatemala		
Stela 2		9.14.1.3.18	13 February 713	Kʼakʼ Tiliw Chan Chaak	Naranjo	Guatemala	Portrait of the monarch	
Stela 3		9.14.1.3.18	13 February 713	Kʼakʼ Tiliw Chan Chaak	Naranjo	Guatemala	Portrait of Wak Chanil Ajaw, mother of the monarch.	
Stela 6				K'ahk' Ukalaw Chan Chaak				
Stela 7				Itzamnaaj K'awiil	Naranjo	Guatemala		
Stela 8				Itzamnaaj K'awiil	Naranjo	Guatemala		
Stela 10				Itzamnaaj K'awiil	Naranjo	Guatemala	Hieroglyphic text.	
Stela 11				K'ahk' Ukalaw Chan Chaak	Naranjo	Guatemala		
Stela 12				Itzamnaaj K'awiil	Naranjo	Guatemala		
Stela 13				K'ahk' Ukalaw Chan Chaak	Naranjo	Guatemala		
Stela 14				Itzamnaaj K'awiil	Naranjo	Guatemala		
Stela 15				Aj Wosal Chan K'inich	Naranjo	Guatemala		
Stela 16				Aj Wosal Chan K'inich	Naranjo	Guatemala		
Stela 17				Aj Wosal Chan K'inich	Naranjo	Guatemala		
Stela 18		9.14.14.17.19	14 September 726	Kʼakʼ Tiliw Chan Chaak	Naranjo	Guatemala	Portrait of Wak Chanil Ajaw, mother of the monarch.	
Stela 19				K'ahk' Ukalaw Chan Chaak	Naranjo	Guatemala		
Stela 20				K'ak' Yipiiy Chan Chaak	Naranjo	Guatemala		
Stela 21		9.13.14.4.0	24 March 706	Kʼakʼ Tiliw Chan Chaak	Naranjo	Guatemala	The stela celebrates the victory of Kʼakʼ Tiliw Chan Chaak over Yootz.	
Stela 22		9.13.9.17.19	23 January 702	Kʼakʼ Tiliw Chan Chaak	Naranjo	Guatemala		
Stela 23		9.13.18.4.16	19 March 710	Kʼakʼ Tiliw Chan Chaak	Naranjo	Guatemala		
Stela 24		9.13.9.17.19	23 January 702	Kʼakʼ Tiliw Chan Chaak	Naranjo	Guatemala	Portrait of Wak Chanil Ajaw, mother of the monarch, then still his regent. The queen is portrayed over a prisoner, the king Kinichil Kab of Ucanal. The text mentions the queen's arrival at Naranjo on 30 August 682.	
Stela 25				Aj Wosal Chan K'inich	Naranjo	Guatemala	Commemoration of the ascension of the monarch, which had the supervision of K'altuun Hix, King of Dzibanche/Calakmul.	
Stela 26				Kʼakʼ Tiliw Chan Chaak	Naranjo	Guatemala		
Stela 27				Aj Wosal Chan K'inich	Naranjo	Guatemala		
Stela 28		9.14.4.7.13	13 April 716	Kʼakʼ Tiliw Chan Chaak	Naranjo	Guatemala	The stela records victories of the monarch.	
Stela 29		9.14.3.0.0	17 November 714	Kʼakʼ Tiliw Chan Chaak	Naranjo	Guatemala	Portrait of Wak Chanil Ajaw, mother of the monarch.	
Stela 30		9.14.3.0.0	17 November 714	Kʼakʼ Tiliw Chan Chaak	Naranjo	Guatemala	Portrait of the monarch. The stela also records a victory of Naranjo over Sakha.	
Stela 31		9.14.9.17.19	10 October 721	Kʼakʼ Tiliw Chan Chaak	Naranjo	Guatemala	Portrait of Wak Chanil Ajaw, mother of the monarch.	
Stela 32					Naranjo	Guatemala	Hieroglyphic text.	
Stela 33				K'ahk' Ukalaw Chan Chaak	Naranjo	Guatemala		
Stela 35			799	Itzamnaaj K'awiil	Naranjo	Guatemala	The stela records a victory over Yaxha.	
Stela 36				K'ahk' Ukalaw Chan Chaak	Naranjo	Guatemala	Hieroglyphic text.	
Stela 38				Aj Wosal Chan K'inich	Naranjo	Guatemala		
Stela 40		9.14.9.17.19	10 October 721	Kʼakʼ Tiliw Chan Chaak	Naranjo	Guatemala	Portrait of the monarch.	
Stela 41				Aj Wosal Chan K'inich	Naranjo	Guatemala		
Stela 46		9.14.14.17.19	14 September 726	Kʼakʼ Tiliw Chan Chaak	Naranjo	Guatemala	Portrait of the monarch.	
Stela 1		9.14.14.17.18	13 September 726		Nim Li Punit	Belize	Portrait of a monarch	
Stela 2		9.14.15.4.12	16 December 726		Nim Li Punit	Belize	Portrait of a monarch.	
Stela 7					Nim Li Punit	Belize	Portraits of two rulers.	
Stela 14		9.17.19.17.18	7 October 790		Nim Li Punit	Belize	Portrait of a monarch.	
Stela 15					Nim Li Punit	Belize	Portrait of a monarch.	
Stela 21					Nim Li Punit	Belize	Portrait of a monarch.	
Stela 23			780		Nim Li Punit	Belize	Portrait of a monarch	
Stela 1		9.7.15.0.0.	17 September 588		Ojo de Agua	Mexico	Hieroglyphic text.	
Stela 3					Oxkintok	Mexico	Depicts probably a ritual.	
Stela 9					Oxkintok	Mexico	Portrait of a monarch dancing, or performing a ritual.	
Jamb					Oxkintok	Mexico	Portrait of a monarch.	
Stela 6					Pacbitun	Belize	Portrait of a monarch.	
Stela of Madrid					Palenque	Mexico	Portrait of a monarch.	
Stela					Palenque	Mexico	Fragmented stela that shows the bottom part of a portrait of a monarch.	
Stela					Palenque	Mexico	Fragmented stela that shows the upper part of a portrait of a monarch.	
Lintel 1					Pasadita, La	Guatemala	The lintel shows Yaxun Bahlam IV of Yaxchilan, with a captive.	
Lintel 2		9.16.15.0.0	17 February 766	Tiloom	Pasadita, La	Guatemala	Portrait of the monarch, with Yaxun Bahlam IV of Yaxchilan.	
Stela 11			672	Lady K'abel and K'inich Bahlam	Perú, El	Guatemala	Portrait of the male monarch.	
Stela 12			672	Lady K'abel and K'inich Bahlam	Perú, El	Guatemala	Portrait of the female monarch, who came from Calakmul and had a superior title than her husband.	
Stela 15		8.19.0.0.0	23 March 416		Perú, El	Guatemala	The monument contains only Maya glyphs. Stanley Gunter dates the stela to 416. The monument contains the names of rulers back until the mid 4th century. The monument also describes how a foreign war leader Siyaj K'ahk, or Siyaj K'ak' came to Waka' during January of 378. According to epigrapher David Stuart (Mayanist), this stela supports the idea of Siyaj K'ahk' traveling through Waka' roughly eight days before taking over Tikal's government.	
Stela 16					Perú, El	Guatemala	The monument shows a man wearing a headdress and royal outfit similar to rulers of Teotihuacan. The man holds a bird-headed staph on his right and a bundle on his left. David Freidel suggests the bird head is a symbol for "Spearthrower Owl." This was one name used for a certain king of Teotihuacan, and the father of Siyaj K'ahk'. Epigrapher Stanley Guenter deciphered part of the Maya script on Stela 16 and believes it says "planted [his] banner stone, Siyaj K'ahk". Freidel thinks this monument is a depiction of the war leader many years after he had traveled through Waka'.	
Stela 18			682	Lady K'abel and K'inich Bahlam	Perú, El	Guatemala	Portrait of the male monarch.	
Stela 20			682	Lady K'abel and K'inich Bahlam	Perú, El	Guatemala	Portrait of the female monarch.	
Stela 30				Mah-Kina Bahlam	Perú, El	Guatemala	The text of stela 30 describes the contact of the monarch and his wife to the king Jaguar-Paw, of Calakmul. The stela says they participated, along with other kings from western kingdoms, in the ritual of accession for Jaguar-Paw. One of these kings may have included Flint-Sky-God K of Dos Pilas, well known for his many captives. The stela describes how Mah-Kina-Balam and his wife were a part of the period-ending rites and displayed the God K scepter to Jaguar-Paw. Stela 30 also gives proof of Jaguar-Paw's visits to El Perú.	
Stela 33			692	Lady K'abel and K'inich Bahlam	Perú, El	Guatemala	Portrait of the male monarch.	
Stela 34			692	Lady K'abel and K'inich Bahlam	Perú, El	Guatemala	Portrait of the female monarch, described as a lady warlord.	
Stela 43			702		Perú, El	Guatemala	The text shown mentions a queen named Ikoom, that came from Calakmul.	
Stela 1			September 706	K'inich Yo'nal Ahk II	Piedras Negras	Guatemala	Portrait of Lady K'atun Ajaw of Namaan, wife of the monarch.	
Stela 2			September 706	K'inich Yo'nal Ahk II	Piedras Negras	Guatemala		
Stela 3			711	K'inich Yo'nal Ahk II	Piedras Negras	Guatemala	Portraits of the monarch (front), and of Lady K'atun Ajaw of Namaan (the monarch's wife) and three-year old daughter of the couple, Lady Juntan Ahk (back). Hieroglyphic text.	
Stela 4			711	K'inich Yo'nal Ahk II	Piedras Negras	Guatemala		
Stela 5				K'inich Yo'nal Ahk II	Piedras Negras	Guatemala		
Stela 6				K'inich Yo'nal Ahk II	Piedras Negras	Guatemala		
Stela 7		9.15.0.0.0	20 August 731	K'inich Yo'nal Ahk II	Piedras Negras	Guatemala	Portraits of the monarch, standing, with a captive.	
Stela 8		9.14.14.9.19	18 March 726	K'inich Yo'nal Ahk II	Piedras Negras	Guatemala	Portraits of the monarch, standing, with a captive.	
Stela 9		9.15.5.3.13	5 October 736	Itzam K'an Ahk II	Piedras Negras	Guatemala		
Stela 10				Itzam K'an Ahk II	Piedras Negras	Guatemala		
Stela 11		9.15.0.0.2	22 August 731	Itzam K'an Ahk II	Piedras Negras	Guatemala	Portrait of the monarch enthroned.	
Stela 12		9.18.5.0.2	15 September 795	K'inich Yat Ahk II	Piedras Negras	Guatemala	The monarch receives two war chieftains, who bring him captives.	
Stela 13				Ha' K'in Xook	Piedras Negras	Guatemala		
Stela 14				Yo'nal Ahk III	Piedras Negras	Guatemala		
Stela 15				K'inich Yat Ahk II	Piedras Negras	Guatemala		
Stela 16				Yo'nal Ahk III	Piedras Negras	Guatemala		
Stela 18				Ha' K'in Xook	Piedras Negras	Guatemala		
Stela 22				Itzam K'an Ahk II	Piedras Negras	Guatemala		
Stela 23				Ha' K'in Xook	Piedras Negras	Guatemala		
Stela 25				K'inich Yo'nal Ahk I	Piedras Negras	Guatemala		
Stela 26		9.9.11.12.3	11 November 624	K'inich Yo'nal Ahk I	Piedras Negras	Guatemala	Portrait of the monarch, standing, with a captive.	
Stela 29					Piedras Negras	Guatemala	Hieroglyphic text.	
Stela 31				K'inich Yo'nal Ahk I	Piedras Negras	Guatemala		
Stela 32					Piedras Negras	Guatemala		
Stela 33				Itzam K'an Ahk I	Piedras Negras	Guatemala		
Stela 34				Itzam K'an Ahk I	Piedras Negras	Guatemala		
Stela 35		9.11.10.0.0	21 August 662	Itzam K'an Ahk I	Piedras Negras	Guatemala	Portrait of the monarch, standing, with a captive.	
Stela 36				Itzam K'an Ahk I	Piedras Negras	Guatemala	Hieroglyphic text.	
Stela 37				Itzam K'an Ahk I	Piedras Negras	Guatemala		
Stela 38				Itzam K'an Ahk I	Piedras Negras	Guatemala		
Stela 39				Itzam K'an Ahk I	Piedras Negras	Guatemala		
Stela 40			746	Itzam K'an Ahk II	Piedras Negras	Guatemala		
Lintel 1				K'inich Yat Ahk II	Piedras Negras	Guatemala		
Lintel 2			658	Itzam K'an Ahk I	Piedras Negras	Guatemala	Commemoration of the death of Yo'nal Ahk II.	
Lintel 3				K'inich Yat Ahk II	Piedras Negras	Guatemala		
Lintel 4				Itzam K'an Ahk I	Piedras Negras	Guatemala	Portrait of the monarch, with captives.	
Lintel 7				Itzam K'an Ahk I	Piedras Negras	Guatemala		
Lintel 12			514	Piedras Negras Ruler C	Piedras Negras	Guatemala		
Lintel 15				K'inich Yo'nal Ahk II	Piedras Negras	Guatemala		
Stela 1					Pixoy	Mexico	Portraits of unknown monarchs.	
Stela 2					Pixoy	Mexico	Portraits of unknown monarchs.	
Stela 3					Pixoy	Mexico	Portraits of unknown monarchs.	
Stela 4					Pixoy	Mexico	Portraits of unknown monarchs.	
Stela 5					Pixoy	Mexico	Portraits of unknown monarchs.	
Stela					Plan de Ayutla	Mexico	Portrait of a monarch.	
Stela					Planchón del Rey	Mexico	Portrait of a monarch.	
Stela 1					Poco Uinic (Santa Elena)	Mexico		
Stela 2					Poco Uinic (Santa Elena)	Mexico		
Stela 3		9.17.19.13.16	17 July 790		Poco Uinic (Santa Elena)	Mexico		
Monument 1					Poco Uinic (Santa Elena)	Mexico		
Monument 2					Poco Uinic (Santa Elena)	Mexico		
Monument 3					Poco Uinic (Santa Elena)	Mexico		
Stela					Pomona	Mexico	Portrait of the queen K'an Bolon.	
Stela C					Pusilha	Belize	Portrait of a monarch.	
Stela D				Ruler B of Pusilha	Pusilha	Belize	Portrait of the monarch.	
Stela E				Ruler G of Pusilha	Pusilha	Belize	Portrait of the monarch and Bahlam Nehn of Copán.	
Stela F					Pusilha	Belize		
Stela H				Ruler C of Pusilha	Pusilha	Belize		
Stela K				Ruler C of Pusilha	Pusilha	Belize	Portrait of the monarch.	
Stela M				Ruler E of Pusilha	Pusilha	Belize		
Stela O				Ruler B of Pusilha	Pusilha	Belize		
Stela P		9.17.0.0.0	5 December 573	Ruler A of Pusilha	Pusilha	Belize	Portrait of a monarch. Text referring to an event on 17 June 571, implying that the kingdom was founded shortly before the beginning of the Late Classic period.	
Stela Q		9.8.0.0.6	28 August 593	Ruler B of Pusilha	Pusilha	Belize		
Stela U				Ruler X1 of Pusilha	Pusilha	Belize		
Stela 1				K'ak' Tiliw Chan Yopaat	Quiriguá	Guatemala		
Stela A		9.17.5.0.2	29 December 775	K'ak' Tiliw Chan Yopaat	Quiriguá	Guatemala	Forms a pair with Stela C.	
Stela C		9.17.5.0.2	29 December 775	K'ak' Tiliw Chan Yopaat	Quiriguá	Guatemala	The hieroglyphic text contains references to 455 and Tutuum Yohl K'inich, an early king.< The stela also bears a reference to the date 13.0.0.0.0 4 Ahaw 8 Kumk'u (13 August 3114 BC). This date is recorded throughout the entire Maya area as the beginning of the current creation, when the deities were placed in order. Stela C forms a pair with Stela A and was dedicated on the same date.	
Stela D			766	K'ak' Tiliw Chan Yopaat	Quiriguá	Guatemala	It is distinguished by the relatively rare, extravagant, full-figure anthropomorphic versions of Maya hieroglyphics on the upper parts of its sides, which are particularly well preserved.	
Stela E		9.17.0.0.2	24 January 771	K'ak' Tiliw Chan Yopaat	Quiriguá	Guatemala	Portrait of the monarch on the stela's front and back. This stela is the largest stone ever quarried by the ancient Maya, may even be the largest free-standing worked monolith in the New World.	
Stela F			761	K'ak' Tiliw Chan Yopaat	Quiriguá	Guatemala	Portrait of the monarch on the stela's north and south sides and hieroglyphic inscriptions on its east and west sides.	
Stela H			751	K'ak' Tiliw Chan Yopaat	Quiriguá	Guatemala	Its glyphs are arranged in a rare mat pattern, copied from Copán. The stela is executed in the wrap-around style.A flint blade was found buried under the stela butt, buried as an offering when the stela was dedicated. The hieroglyphic inscriptions are badly damaged.	
Stela I					Quiriguá	Guatemala		
Stela J			756	K'ak' Tiliw Chan Yopaat	Quiriguá	Guatemala		
Stela K		9.18.15.0.6	24 July 805	Jade Sky	Quiriguá	Guatemala	Last and smallest stela constructed at Quiriguá. Depicts a beardless Jade Sky, ruler of Quiriguá and a God K shield emblem on the opposite side. Its small size is reflective of the city's decline.	
Stela S			746	K'ak' Tiliw Chan Yopaat	Quiriguá	Guatemala	Portrait of the monarch on the front, the other three sides being covered by hieroglyphic text. Unfortunately, due to the heavy erosion most of the text is illegible.	
Stela T			692		Quiriguá	Guatemala	The stela is a badly eroded schist sculpture bearing mostly unreadable glyphs accompanying a poorly preserved figure. The stela is conservative in style, being similar to the much older Stela U.	
Stela U		9.2.5.0.2	18 April 480	Turtle Shell	Quiriguá	Guatemala	Heavily eroded portrait of the monarch, extending over three sides of the stela. This style originated in Tikal and indicates contact with the central Petén region. This stela has an identifiable date, and references a ritual that was supervised by the king of Copán.	
Stela 1		9.16.10.0.0	17 March 761	Ch'iyel	Sacul	Guatemala	The earliest dated monument known from the city. The text refers a participation of the monarch in a bloodletting ceremony.	
Stela 2		9.18.0.0.0	11 October 790	Ch'iyel	Sacul	Guatemala	Commemoration of the visit of the monarch to Ixkun. Portraits of the monarch and the king of Ixkun, Rabbit God K, facing each other and holding staves of rulership, with a prisoner in a panel beneath their feet.	
Stela 3					Sacul	Guatemala	The stela bears hieroglyphic inscriptions. Although now largely illegible, it is evident that a number of calendrical dates were included.	
Stela 4					Sacul	Guatemala	Plain monuments fashioned from fossiliferous limestone.	
Stela 5					Sacul	Guatemala	Plain monuments fashioned from fossiliferous limestone.	
Stela 6			9th century (full date incomplete)		Sacul	Guatemala	Portrait of a monarch accompanied by a hieroglyphic text.	
Stela 7					Sacul	Guatemala	Plain monuments fashioned from fossiliferous limestone.	
Stela 8					Sacul	Guatemala	Plain monuments fashioned from fossiliferous limestone.	
Stela 9		9.18.0.0.0	11 October 790	Ch'iyel	Sacul	Guatemala	Portrait of the monarch.	
Stela 10		9.18.10.0.0	28 August 800		Sacul	Guatemala	The stela is the latest monument erected in the city	
Stela 12					Sacul	Guatemala	Plain monument fashioned from fossiliferous limestone.	
Stela 1					Santa Elena	Mexico		
Stela 4					Sayil	Mexico	Portrait of a monarch.	
Stela 5					Sayil	Mexico	Portrait of a monarch.	
Stela 9					Sayil	Mexico	Portrait of a monarch.	
Stela 2					Takalik Abaj	Guatemala		
Stela 5					Takalik Abaj	Guatemala		
Stela 14					Takalik Abaj	Guatemala		
Stela 18					Takalik Abaj	Guatemala		
Stela 53					Takalik Abaj	Guatemala		
Stela 55					Takalik Abaj	Guatemala		
Stela 4					Tamarindito	Guatemala	Hieroglyphic text.	
Stela 1			5th century	Sihyaj Chan Kʼawiil II	Tikal	Guatemala	Portrait of the monarch, standing.	
Stela 2				K'an Chitam	Tikal	Guatemala		
Stela 3				Chak Tok Ichʼaak II	Tikal	Guatemala	Hieroglyphic text.	
Stela 4			396	Yax Nuun Ayiin I	Tikal	Guatemala	It is dated after the intrusion of Teotihuacan in the Maya area. The stela displays a mix of Maya and Teotihuacan qualities, and deities from both cultures. It has a portrait of the monarch with the Underworld Jaguar God under one arm and the Mexican Tlaloc under the other. His helmet is a simplified version of the Teotihuacan War Serpent. Unusually for Maya sculpture, but typically for Teotihuacan, the monarch is depicted with a frontal face, rather than in profile.	
Stela 5			744	Yik'in Chan K'awiil	Tikal	Guatemala		
Stela 6			514	Yo K'in and Kaloomteʼ Bahlam	Tikal	Guatemala	Badly damaged monument bearing the name of the "Lady of Tikal" who celebrated the end of the 4th K'atun in that year.	
Stela 7				Chak Tok Ichʼaak II	Tikal	Guatemala		
Stela 8				Bird Claw	Tikal	Guatemala		
Stela 9				Kʼan Chitam	Tikal	Guatemala		
Stela 10			6th-century	Yo K'in and Kaloomteʼ Bahlam	Tikal	Guatemala	Badly damaged. It described the accession of Kaloomte' Bahlam in the early 6th century and earlier events in his career, including the capture of a prisoner depicted on the monument.	
Stela 11			869	Jasaw Chan K'awiil II	Tikal	Guatemala	Last monument ever erected at Tikal.	
Stela 12		9.4.13.0.0	9 August 527	Yo K'in and Kaloomteʼ Bahlam	Tikal	Guatemala	The queen is described as performing the year-ending rituals but the monument was dedicated in honor of the king.	
Stela 13				Kʼan Chitam	Tikal	Guatemala		
Stela 15				Chak Tok Ichʼaak II	Tikal	Guatemala		
Stela 16		9.14.0.1.0	23 December 711	Jasaw Chan K'awiil I	Tikal	Guatemala	Portrait of the monarch and a hieroglyphic text in the front face of the monument.	
Stela 17		9.6.3.9.15	15 September 557	Wak Chan K'awiil	Tikal	Guatemala	Portrait of the monarch.	
Stela 18		8.18.0.0.0	6 July 396	Yax Nuun Ayiin I	Tikal	Guatemala	Celebration of the k'atun-ending of 396.	
Stela 19		9.18.0.0.0	9 October 790	Yax Nuun Ayiin II	Tikal	Guatemala		
Stela 20		9.16.0.0.0	7 May 751	Yik'in Chan K'awiil	Tikal	Guatemala		
Stela 21		9.15.5.0.0	24 July 736	Yik'in Chan K'awiil	Tikal	Guatemala	Only the bottom of the stela is intact, the rest having been mutilated in ancient times. The surviving sculpture is of fine quality, consisting of the feet of a figure and of accompanying hieroglyphic text. The stela is associated with Altar 9.	
Stela 22		9.17.0.0.0	22 January 771	Yax Nuun Ayiin II	Tikal	Guatemala	Probably a portrait of the monarch. The face of the figure has been mutilated.	
Stela 23			6th century	Lady Yo K'in and Kaloomteʼ Bahlam	Tikal	Guatemala	Defaced portrait of the queen called "Lady of Tikal", a daughter of Chak Tok Ich'aak II who became queen at the age of six but never ruled in her own right, being paired with male co-rulers.	
Stela 24		9.19.0.0.0	26 June 810	Dark Sun	Tikal	Guatemala	Broken into fragments in ancient times, although the name of Dark Sun survives on three fragments.	
Stela 25		9.4.3.0.0	30 September 517	Lady Yo K'in and Kaloomteʼ Bahlam	Tikal	Guatemala	Portrait of the queen.	
Stela 26				Chak Tok Ichʼaak I	Tikal	Guatemala	Broken, probably at the beginning of the Late Classic. Its remains were then interred within the temple shrine.	
Stela 27		9.3.0.0.0	28 January 495	Chak Tok Ichʼaak I	Tikal	Guatemala		
Stela 28				Kʼinich Muwaan Jol and/or Sihyaj Chan Kʼawiil II	Tikal	Guatemala		
Stela 29		8.12.14.8.15	6 July 292	Foliated Jaguar	Tikal	Guatemala	The earliest surviving Long Count date from the Maya lowlands. The stela is also the earliest monument to bear the Tikal emblem glyph. It bears a portrait of the monarch facing to the right, holding the head of an underworld jaguar god, one of the patron deities of the city. The stela was deliberately smashed during the 6th century or some time later, the upper portion was dragged away and dumped in a rubbish tip close to Temple III, to be uncovered by archeologists in 1959.	
Stela 30		9.13.0.0.0	16 March 692	Jasaw Chan Kʼawiil I	Tikal	Guatemala	First surviving monument to be erected after the Hiatus. Its style and iconography is similar to that of Caracol, one of the more important of Tikal's enemies.	
Stela 31		9.0.10.0.0	17 October 445	Siyaj Chan K'awiil II	Tikal	Guatemala	The accession monument of the monarch, which bears two portraits of his father, Yax Nuun Ayiin I, as a youth dressed as a Teotihuacan warrior.He carries a spearthrower in one hand and bears a shield decorated with the face of Tlaloc, the Teotihuacan war god. The stela has been described as the greatest Early Classic sculpture to survive at Tikal. A long hieroglyphic text is carved onto the back of the monument, the longest to survive from the Early Classic, which describes the arrival of Siyah K'ak' at El Perú and Tikal in January 378. It was also the first stela at Tikal to be carved on all four faces.	
Stela 32					Tikal	Guatemala	Fragmented monument with a foreign Teotihuacan-style sculpture apparently depicting the lord of that city with the attributes of the central Mexican storm god Tlaloc, including his goggle eyes and tasselled headdress.	
Stela 39		8.17.0.0.0	19 October 376	Chak Tok Ich'aak I	Tikal	Guatemala	A broken monument that was erected in the Lost World complex. The upper portion of the stela is missing but the lower portion shows the lower body and legs of the monarch, holding a flint axe in his left hand. He is trampling the figure of a bound, richly dressed captive. The text on the back of the monument describes a bloodletting ritual to celebrate a Katun-ending. The stela also names the monarch's father as K'inich Muwaan Jol.	
Stela 40		9.1.13.0.0	18 June 468	Kʼan Chitam	Tikal	Guatemala	Portrait of the monarch.	
Stela 43					Tikal	Guatemala	A plain monument, paired with Altar 35.	
Stela 1		10.0.0.0.0	13 March 830		Tila	Mexico	Portrait of a monarch.	
Stela 2		9.12.13.0.0	22 April 685		Tila	Mexico		
Stela 3		9.13.0.0.0	16 March 692		Tila	Mexico		
Stela					Tonalá	Mexico	Portrait of a monarch/warrior/god.	
Stela 1			6th century	B'alam Ya Acal	Toniná	Mexico	Portrait of the monarch.	
Stela (?)		10.3.12.9.6	3 September 901		Toniná	Mexico	Portrait of a monarch.	
Monument 3			688	K'inich Baaknal Chaak	Toniná	Mexico	It is a statue, broken into various fragments, but is largely complete and only lightly eroded. Represents the monarch with inscriptions describing his accession and the promotion of Aj Ch'aaj Naah to the priesthood .	
Monument 5					Toniná	Mexico	The stela depicts a badly eroded life-size human statue with the head missing.	
Monument 7			728	K'inich Ich'aak Chapat	Toniná	Mexico	The stela was carved from yellow sandstone and suffered only minor damage. It is a stela base with well-preserved hieroglyphs on all four vertical sides	
Monument 8			682	Ruler 2 of Toniná	Toniná	Mexico	The stela shows the presentation of three war captives to the monarch.	
Monument 12			672	Ruler 2 of Toniná	Toniná	Mexico	The stela is a sculpture carved in the round, representing the monarch.	
Monument 27					Toniná	Mexico	The stela is a carved step depicting K'awiil Mo', a lord from Palenque, as an elderly prisoner, bound and lying on his back with his profile positioned in such a way as to be trodden on time and again.	
Monument 99					Toniná	Mexico	An undated fragment that depicts a female captive, a rare theme in Maya art.	
Monument 101			909		Toniná	Mexico	This monument has the last Long Count date from any Maya monument, celebrating a K'atun ending.	
Monument 106			593	Ruler 1 of Toniná	Toniná	Mexico	This stela has the earliest securely dated monument at the site.	
Monument 113				Ruler 2 of Toniná	Toniná	Mexico	The stela depicts the monarch participating in a scattering ritual.	
Monument 114			794	Ruler 8 of Toniná	Toniná	Mexico	The monument commemorates the death of an important noble, apparently a relative or vassal of Ruler 8's predecessor Tuun Chapat.	
Monument 122		9.13.19.13.3	28 August 711	Ruler 4 of Toniná	Toniná	Mexico	A low relief sculpture marking the defeat of Palenque by the monarch and the capture of Kan Joy Chitam II, who is depicted as a bound captive.	
Monument 141				K'inich B'aaknal Chaak	Toniná	Mexico	The stela is a very well preserved hieroglyphic panel carved from fine grained white limestone with almost the whole inscription intact. It describes the dedication of a ballcourt by the monarch.	
Monumrnt 154			633	K'inich Hix Chapat	Toniná	Mexico	The stela records the installing of two subordinate lords by the monarch.	
Monument 158			904	Ruler 10 of Toniná	Toniná	Mexico		
Stela 3					Tortuguero	Mexico	Hieroglyphic text.	
Stela 6					Tortuguero	Mexico	This stela includes the only known inscription depicting the end of the 13-Bak'tun era in 2012.	
Stela 1		8.18.10.0.0 (front); 8.19.0.0.0 (back)	15 May 406 (front); 23 March 416 (back)		Tres Islas	Guatemala	Badly damaged.	
Stela 2		8.18.14.15.0 (front); 9.2.0.0.0 (back)	18 February 411 (front); 13 May 475 (back)		Tres Islas	Guatemala	It was associated with an offering consisting of two ceramic vessels placed rim to rim; these contained 9 jade figurines including representations of shells, a tortoise and a human head in profile, as well as pieces of coral and shells that included a cowry.	
Stela 3			400		Tres Islas	Guatemala	The smallest of the three stelae. It is broken diagonally in two fragments. The stela depicts a personage dressed in the war-garb of Teotihuacan and bearing three feathered darts in his left hand. The figure wears an elaborate feathered headdress with cheek guards, and a fan-shaped tail piece formed of feathers and the tails of three coyotes. The image of the warrior is very similar to the portrait of Tikal king Yax Nuun Ayiin I as depicted on Stela 31 of that city. Above the figure there is the image of a flying bird of a type commonly found on the monuments of the Pacific Coast, and the figure stands upon an image of a scarlet macaw, believed to be an identifying symbol of Tres Islas. The text of the stela is badly eroded, consisting of an introductory glyph and two columns of eight glyphs. The date recorded on the stela appears to equate to a date in 400.	
Stela 1					Tulum	Mexico	Portrait of one or two different monarchs.	
Stela 2					Tulum	Mexico	Portrait of a monarch or a god.	
Stela					Tzendales	Mexico	Portrait of a monarch.	
Stela 1					Tzum	Mexico	Portraits of unknown monarchs	
Stela 2					Tzum	Mexico	Portraits of unknown monarchs	
Stela 3					Tzum	Mexico	Portraits of unknown monarchs	
Stela 4					Tzum	Mexico	Portraits of unknown monarchs	
Stela 5					Tzum	Mexico		
Stela 6					Tzum	Mexico		
Stela 1					Uaxactun	Guatemala	Hieroglyphic text.	
Stela 2					Uaxactun	Guatemala		
Stela 3					Uaxactun	Guatemala	References in text to a monarch, Wak Kab' Ajaw' ruling in 300 BCE.	
Stela 4			396	Sun Charger	Uaxactun	Guatemala		
Stela 5			August 391	Sun Charger	Uaxactun	Guatemala	Portrait of a warrior from Teotihuacan, possibly K'ihnich Mo', a captain appointed to represent Siyaj K'ak' of Tikal in the city. References in text to this ruler of Tikal.	
Stela 6					Uaxactun	Guatemala		
Stela 7					Uaxactun	Guatemala		
Stela 8					Uaxactun	Guatemala		
Stela 9					Uaxactun	Guatemala		
Stela 10					Uaxactun	Guatemala	Portrait of a monarch.	
Stela 11					Uaxactun	Guatemala		
Stela 12			869		Uaxactun	Guatemala	Hieroglyphic text.	
Stela 13					Uaxactun	Guatemala	Hieroglyphic text.	
Stela 14			702		Uaxactun	Guatemala		
Stela 15					Uaxactun	Guatemala		
Stela 16					Uaxactun	Guatemala		
Stela 17					Uaxactun	Guatemala	Hieroglyphic text.	
Stela 18		8.16.0.0.0	1 February 357		Uaxactun	Guatemala		
Stela 19					Uaxactun	Guatemala	Portrait of a monarch.	
Stela 20					Uaxactun	Guatemala		
Stela 21					Uaxactun	Guatemala		
Stela 22					Uaxactun	Guatemala		
Stela 2					Ucanal	Guatemala	Portraits of unknown monarchs.	
Stela 3					Ucanal	Guatemala	Portraits of unknown monarchs.	
Stela 4					Ucanal	Guatemala	Portraits of unknown monarchs.	
Stela 6					Ucanal	Guatemala	Portraits of unknown monarchs.	
Stela 7					Ucanal	Guatemala	Hieroglyphic text.	
Stela 5					Uxbenka	Belize	The carvings on this stela are deteriorated to the point that archaeologists have not been able to identify what the carvings depicted.	
Stela 6					Uxbenka	Belize	This stela is missing its upper half, it appears that its upper half was broken off. Glyphs were found on this stela, which has been dated to the Late Classic period. Of those glyphs, one section reads “Hanab Pakal”, which has been translated to “flower shield”.	
Stela 11		8.18.0.0.0	6 July 396		Uxbenka	Belize	This stela was found in three pieces. Similarly to Stela 6, Stela 11 is also missing its upper half. Stela 11 contains some of the more readable glyphs found in Uxbenka. Additional legible glyphs found on Stela 11 include a jaguar paw similar to one found on Tikal Stela 39. Iconography present on Stela 11 includes the lower half of an individual with both feet pointed in the same direction and a Double-Headed Serpent Bar. This indicated that this stela is from the Early Classic also, as it is a pose consistent with other Early Classic iconography.	
Stela 14					Uxbenka	Belize	Stela 14 is not only the tallest of the stela at Uxbenka but also, “the tallest monument at Uxbenka”. Most of the inscriptions were eroded off by natural weathering processes. Faint outlines of a large Late Classic-style witz monster are nevertheless observable.	
Stela 15		9.17.10.0.0	30 November 780		Uxbenka	Belize	Inscriptions on this stela that remain legible include the initial series introductory glyph (ISIG) and a long count date.	
Stela 18					Uxbenka	Belize	Although partly eroded, iconography on Stela 18 is interpreted to show an Early Classic ruler. Faint outlines of inscriptions are seen on Stela 18, but they are too eroded to read.	
Stela 19		9.17.11.0.0	25 November 781		Uxbenka	Belize	Inscriptions on this stela are comparatively well preserved, with 35 glyphs legible. A partial long count date and introductory series initial glyph (ISIG) has been identified.<	
Stela 21					Uxbenka	Belize	Originally only the left half of the stela was found. Similarly to Stela 11 and Stela 18, Stela 21 depicts a similar carving of an Early Classic ruler with a Double-Headed Serpent Bar. This carving helps date it to the Early Classic Period.	
Stela 22			751		Uxbenka	Belize	Six severely eroded glyphs are found on one side of this stela. A possible date was suggested from a legible “Haab” glyph.	
Stela 1					Uxmal	Mexico		
Stela 2					Uxmal	Mexico	Portrait of a monarch.	
Stela 3					Uxmal	Mexico	Portrait of a monarch.	
Stela 4					Uxmal	Mexico	Portrait of a monarch.	
Stela 5					Uxmal	Mexico		
Stela 6					Uxmal	Mexico	Portrait of a monarch.	
Stela 7					Uxmal	Mexico	Portraits of two rulers.	
Stela 8					Uxmal	Mexico		
Stela 9					Uxmal	Mexico	Hieroglyphic text.	
Stela 10					Uxmal	Mexico		
Stela 11					Uxmal	Mexico	Portrait of a monarch.	
Stela 12					Uxmal	Mexico	Portrait of a monarch.	
Stela 13					Uxmal	Mexico		
Stela 14				Kʼahkʼ Pulaj Chan Chaahk	Uxmal	Mexico	Portrait of the monarch.	
Stela 15					Uxmal	Mexico		
Stela 17		10.3.6.0.0	1 April 895	Kʼahkʼ Pulaj Chan Chaahk	Uxmal	Mexico	Hieroglyphic text.	
Stela 2		9.9.19.14.19	25 November 632	Lady Yajaw K'ahk	Uxul	Mexico	Portrait of the monarch.	
Stela 3		9.9.19.14.19	25 November 632	Lady Yajaw K'ahk	Uxul	Mexico	Portrait of the monarch's husband.	
Stela 6		9.11.7.10.18	11 April 660	Muyal Chaak	Uxul	Mexico		
Stela 10		9.12.5.0.0	3 June 677	Muyal Chaak	Uxul	Mexico		
Stela 12			662	Muyal Chaak	Uxul	Mexico	Portrait of the monarch's wife.	
Stela 13			662	Muyal Chaak	Uxul	Mexico	Portrait of the monarch.	
Stela					Wajxaklajun	Guatemala		
Jamb 1					Xcalumkin	Mexico	Hieroglyphic text.	
Jamb 2					Xcalumkin	Mexico	Portraits of unknown rulers.	
Jamb 3					Xcalumkin	Mexico	Portraits of unknown rulers.	
Jamb 4					Xcalumkin	Mexico	Portraits of unknown rulers.	
Jamb 5					Xcalumkin	Mexico	Portraits of unknown rulers.	
Jamb 6					Xcalumkin	Mexico	Portraits of unknown rulers.	
Jamb 7					Xcalumkin	Mexico	Hieroglyphic text.	
Jamb 8					Xcalumkin	Mexico	Hieroglyphic text.	
Jamb 9					Xcalumkin	Mexico	Hieroglyphic text.	
Stela 2					Xtampak (Santa Rosa)	Mexico	Lower fragment of a stela. A foot is visible, along with hieroglyphic text.	
Stela 9					Xtampak (Santa Rosa)	Mexico	Portrait of a monarch.	
Stela 2					Xultun	Guatemala		
Stela 3					Xultun	Guatemala		
Stela 4					Xultun	Guatemala		
Stela 5			672		Xultun	Guatemala	Portrait of a monarch.	
Stela 6			501		Xultun	Guatemala		
Stela 7					Xultun	Guatemala		
Stela 8					Xultun	Guatemala		
Stela 9					Xultun	Guatemala		
Stela 10			889		Xultun	Guatemala	Portrait of a monarch.	
Stela 12					Xultun	Guatemala		
Stela 13					Xultun	Guatemala		
Stela 14					Xultun	Guatemala		
Stela 15					Xultun	Guatemala		
Stela 16					Xultun	Guatemala		
Stela 17					Xultun	Guatemala		
Stela 18			6th-century	Akhnal	Xultun	Guatemala	Hieroglyphic text that mentions the monarch as the 33th in line of the dynasty.	
Stela 19					Xultun	Guatemala		
Stela 20					Xultun	Guatemala		
Stela 21					Xultun	Guatemala	Capture of Buk'a, King of Los Alacranes.	
Stela 22					Xultun	Guatemala		
Stela 23					Xultun	Guatemala		
Stela 24					Xultun	Guatemala	Portrait of a monarch.	
Stela 25					Xultun	Guatemala		
Stela 1					Yaxchilán	Mexico	A damaged portrait.	
Stela 2			613	K'inich Tatb'u Jol III (?)	Yaxchilán	Mexico	Badly weathered, but reveals a portrait.	
Stela 3					Yaxchilán	Mexico	Destroyed and re-erected, revealing a well-preserved sculpture.	
Stela 4					Yaxchilán	Mexico	Destroyed and re-erected, revealing a well-preserved sculpture.	
Stela 5				Itzamnaaj Bahlam III	Yaxchilán	Mexico	Portrait of the monarch in the upper part of the monument.	
Stela 6				Yaxun Bahlam III	Yaxchilán	Mexico		
Stela 7					Yaxchilán	Mexico	Destroyed and re-erected, revealing a well-preserved sculpture of a kneeling figure.	
Stela 9					Yaxchilán	Mexico	Portrait of a monarch.	
Stela 10				Yaxun Bahlam IV	Yaxchilán	Mexico	Portrait of the monarch, between two figures, probably in a ritual. The configuration may be similar, for example, to Stela 2 of Bonampak.	
Stela 11		9.15.15.0.0	1 June 743	Itzamnaaj Bahlam III	Yaxchilán	Mexico	Portraits of the monarch and his son, Yaxun Bahlam IV, participating in a ritual, with well-preserved hieroglyphic text.	
Stela 12					Yaxchilán	Mexico	Hieroglyphic inscriptions.	
Stela 13					Yaxchilán	Mexico	A portrait.	
Stela 15					Yaxchilán	Mexico	Two figures, probably one of them is a monarch. The other is kneeling.	
Stela 18			After 723	Itzamnaaj Bahlam III	Yaxchilán	Mexico	Portrait of the victorious monarch standing over a kneeling captive, identified as Aj Popol Chaj, the ruling lord of Lacanha.	
Stela 19					Yaxchilán	Mexico	Fragmented stela that appears to be a portrait of a monarch.	
Stela 20					Yaxchilán	Mexico	Portrait of a monarch and a kneeling captive.	
Stela 27			514	Joy Bahlam I	Yaxchilán	Mexico	Portrait of the monarch. Earliest stela known from Yaxchilan. The stela was damaged in antiquity and subsequently restored in the Late Classic, probably during the reign of Yaxun Bahlam IV.	
Stela 31					Yaxchilán	Mexico	Sculpted from a stalactite. It is undated and depicts three incised figures and some hieroglyphs.	
Stela 33					Yaxchilán	Mexico	Fragmented monument.	
Stela 35				Itzamnaaj Bahlam III	Yaxchilán	Mexico	Small stela with a portrait of Lady Eveningstar (also known as Lady Ik Skull), wife of the monarch.	
Lintel 1		9.16.1.0.0	1 May 752	Yaxun Bahlam IV	Yaxchilán	Mexico	Portrait of the monarch and his wife, Lady Great Skull Zero.	
Lintel 2		9.16.6.0.0	5 April 757	Yaxun Bahlam IV	Yaxchilán	Mexico	Portrait of the monarch and his son and heir, Itzamnaaj Bahlam IV.	
Lintel 3		9.16.5.0.0	10 April 756	Yaxun Bahlam IV	Yaxchilán	Mexico	Portrait of the monarch with an ally, K'in Mo'Ajaw.	
Lintel 4				Yaxun Bahlam IV	Yaxchilán	Mexico	Portrait of the monarch.	
Lintel 5		9.16.1.2.0	10 June 752	Yaxun Bahlam IV	Yaxchilán	Mexico		
Lintel 6		9.16.1.8.6	14 October 752	Yaxun Bahlam IV	Yaxchilán	Mexico		
Lintel 7		9.16.1.8.8	16 October 752	Yaxun Bahlam IV	Yaxchilán	Mexico		
Lintel 8		9.16.4.1.1	7 May 755	Yaxun Bahlam IV	Yaxchilán	Mexico	The monarch and his ally, Sajal K'an Tok Wayib grab their two captives (Jeweled Skull and Kok Te' Ajaw) in the midst of a battle.	
Lintel 9		9.16.17.6.12	18 June 768	Yaxun Bahlam IV	Yaxchilán	Mexico	The monarch and his brother-in-law, Chak Chami, are dancing.	
Lintel 10			808	K'inich Tatbu Jol IV	Yaxchilán	Mexico	Hieroglyphic text.	
Lintel 12				Yaxun Bahlam IV	Yaxchilán	Mexico	The monarch and a noble/lieutenant, surrounded by what looks like worshippers or war captives, probably about to the sacrificed in his honor.	
Lintel 13		9.16.0.14.5	16 February 752	Yaxun Bahlam IV	Yaxchilán	Mexico	This lintel bears well preserved sculptures.	
Lintel 14		9.15.10.0.1	29 June 741		Yaxchilán	Mexico	This lintel bears well preserved sculptures.	
Lintel 15		9.16.3.16.19 or 9.16.17.2.4	26 March 755 or 22 March 768	Yaxun Bahlam IV	Yaxchilán	Mexico	Portrait of Lady Wak Tuun of Motul de San José, wife of the monarch, during a bloodletting ritual that results in the appearance of the Vision Serpent. It was originally set above the southeast doorway of the central room. Lady Wak Tuun is carrying a basket containing the tools used for the bloodletting ritual, including a stingray spine, rope and bloodstained paper. The Vision Serpent emerges from a bowl containing strips of bark paper.	
Lintel 16		9.16.0.13.17	8 February 752	Yaxun Bahlam IV	Yaxchilán	Mexico	Portrait of the monarch holding a spear and standing over a kneeling captive. The monarch wears the same costume that his father is seen wearing on Lintel 26.	
Lintel 17			752	Yaxun Bahlam IV	Yaxchilán	Mexico	Portrait of the monarch and his wife, Lady B'alam Mut, participating in a bloodletting ritual. The king watches while his wife pulls a rope through her tongue draw blood. This ritual is recorded as having taken place eight days after the capture event depicted on Lintel 16.	
Lintel 18					Yaxchilán	Mexico		
Lintel 21		9.16.1.1.9	30 May 752	Yaxun Bahlam IV	Yaxchilán	Mexico	Hieroglyphic inscriptions.	
Lintel 22					Yaxchilán	Mexico	Hieroglyphic inscriptions.	
Lintel 24		9.13.17.15.12	26 October 709	Itzamnaaj Bahlam III	Yaxchilán	Mexico	Portrait of the monarch and his wife, Lady K'ab'al Xook performing a bloodletting ritual. The king stands holding a burning torch over his wife, who pulls a spiked rope through her tongue. A screenfold book lies in a basket in front of the kneeling princess. The lintel has traces of red and blue pigments. The ceremony represented on the sculpture took place on 28 October 709. This lintel is regarded as a masterpiece of Maya art.	
Lintel 25		9.14.11.15.1	3 August 723	Itzamnaaj Bahlam III	Yaxchilán	Mexico	Portrait of Lady K'ab'al Xook, wife of the monarch, invoking the Vision Serpent to commemorate the accession of her husband to the throne. Lady Xook holds a bowl containing bloodletting apparatus consisting of a stingray spine and bloodstained paper. The Vision Serpent rising before her has two heads, one at each extreme, from the mouth of one emerges a warrior, from the other emerges the head of central Mexican deity Tlaloc, a water god from the distant metropolis of Teotihuacan in the Valley of Mexico. The hieroglyphic inscription on the lintel is unusual, being reversed as if it were meant to be read in a mirror, although the significance of this is unknown. The events depicted on the lintel are described as having occurred "in front of the water of Siyan Chan", a reference to the main plaza of the city being located on the shore of the Usumacinta River.	
Lintel 26			726	Itzamnaaj Bahlam III	Yaxchilán	Mexico	Portrait of the monarch. The king is being offered a helmet before battle.	
Lintel 27					Yaxchilán	Mexico	Hieroglyphic inscriptions.	
Lintel 28		9.16.4.6.17	31 August 755	Yaxun Bahlam IV	Yaxchilán	Mexico	Hieroglyphic inscriptions.	
Lintel 29				Yaxun Bahlam IV	Yaxchilán	Mexico	Series of three lintels bearing a continuous hieroglyphic text detailing the birth and accession of the monarch.	
Lintel 30				Yaxun Bahlam IV	Yaxchilán	Mexico	Series of three lintels bearing a continuous hieroglyphic text detailing the birth and accession of the monarch.	
Lintel 31				Yaxun Bahlam IV	Yaxchilán	Mexico	Series of three lintels bearing a continuous hieroglyphic text detailing the birth and accession of the monarch.	
Lintel 32					Yaxchilán	Mexico	Two portraits.	
Lintel 33					Yaxchilán	Mexico	A portrait.	
Lintel 35			6th-century	K'inich Tatb'u Jol II	Yaxchilán	Mexico	The stela records a series of victories including that over the great city of Calakmul.	
Lintel 37					Yaxchilán	Mexico	Hieroglyphic inscriptions.	
Lintel 38					Yaxchilán	Mexico	Series of three stelae which are sculpted on their edges instead of the undersides.	
Lintel 39					Yaxchilán	Mexico	Series of three stelae which are sculpted on their edges instead of the undersides.	
Lintel 40					Yaxchilán	Mexico	Series of three stelae which are sculpted on their edges instead of the undersides.	
Lintel 41			755	Yaxun Bahlam IV	Yaxchilán	Mexico	The stela celebrates the victories of the monarch. The king is shown preparing for a battle. His wife, Lady Wak Jalam Chan Ajaw of Motul de San José, is offering him his spear.	
Lintel 42					Yaxchilán	Mexico		
Lintel 43					Yaxchilán	Mexico		
Lintel 46					Yaxchilán	Mexico		
Lintel 47		9.4.11.8.16	11 February 526	K'inich Tat'bu Jol II	Yaxchilán	Mexico		
Lintel 48					Yaxchilán	Mexico		
Lintel 50					Yaxchilán	Mexico		
Lintel 53					Yaxchilán	Mexico		
Lintel 54					Yaxchilán	Mexico		
Lintel 55					Yaxchilán	Mexico		
Lintel 58					Yaxchilán	Mexico		
Lintel 60					Yaxchilán	Mexico		
Stela 4					Zacpetén	Guatemala	Portrait of a monarch.	
Stela 5		9.0.4.0.0	18 November 439	Sihyaj Chan Kʼawiil I of Tikal	Zapote, El	Guatemala	Portrait of Lady Ayiin, wife of the monarch	
Stela 12					Zapote Bobal	Guatemala	Portrait of a monarch.	
Lintel 1					Zotz, El	Guatemala	Portrait of a monarch.	

== See also ==
- Copán Altar Q
- Olmec colossal heads
- Pascual Abaj
- Potbelly sculpture
- Yaxchilan Lintel 24
