= Lamaw Ekʼ =

Lamaw Ekʼ was a Maya king of city-state Motul de San José in Guatemala. He ruled 755?–779.

A vessel bearing depicting Lamaw Ekʼ was found as far away as Altar de Sacrificios. Analysis has revealed that it was manufactured in Motul de San José, indicating some form of interaction between these distant sites.

Lamaw Ekʼ ruled directly after Yajaw Teʼ Kʼinich but was not his son, on one vessel his father is given the title kʼuhul Ikʼnal, a "divine noble of Motul de San José" but not the king (whose title is kʼuhul ajaw or "divine lord"). Each of these two rulers had his own dedicated master painter.

The name of the painter who produced the ceramic vessels for Lamaw Ekʼ is only partially deciphered.
