= Watʼul Chatel =

- King of Seibal
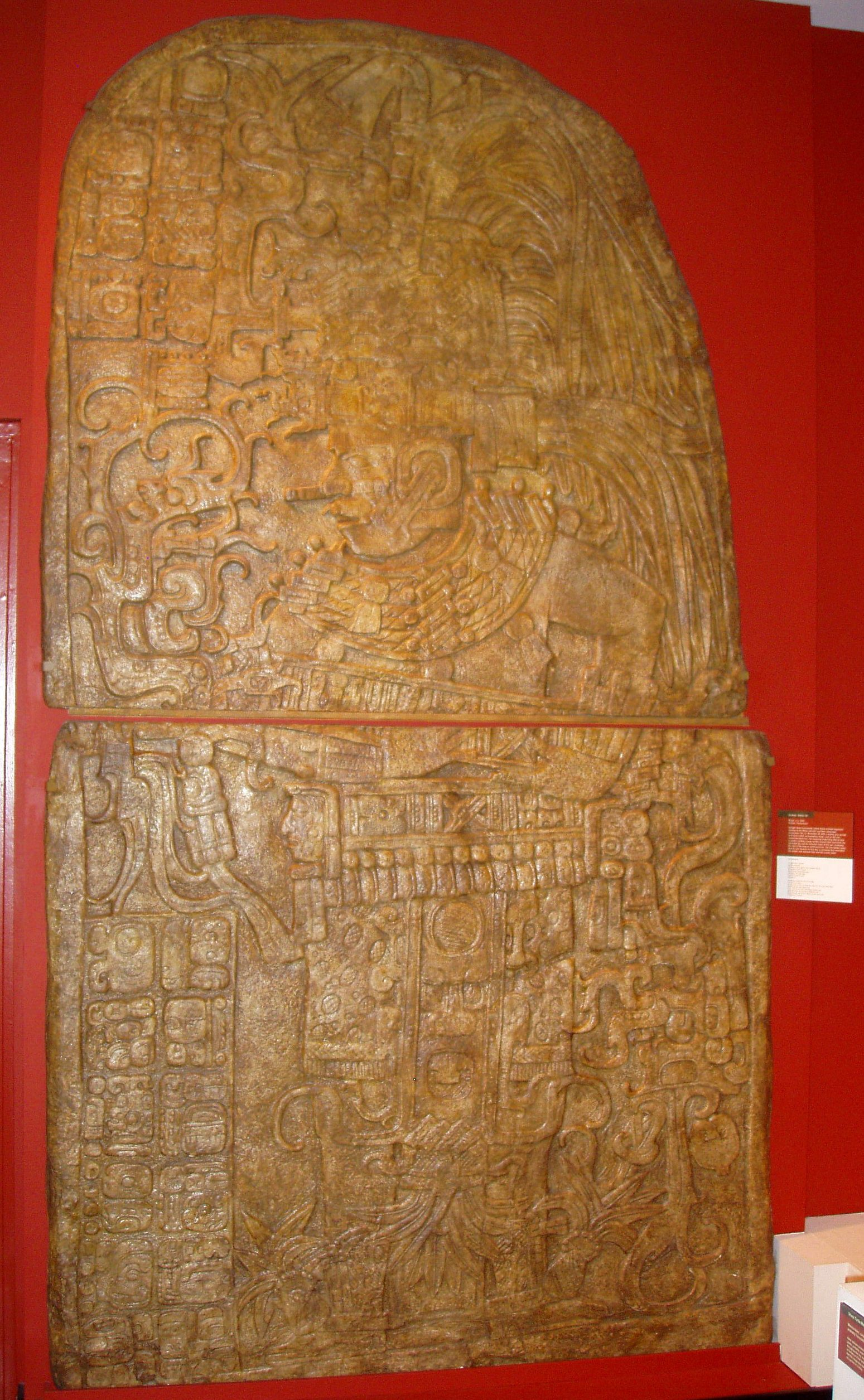
- Stela 10 at Harvard University showing the king Watʼul Chatel
- Religion: Maya religion

Watʼul Chatel was a king of Seibal, the Maya city. He is also known as Aj Bʼolon Haabʼtal.

== Biography ==
Seibal's refounding took place in AD 830 when Watʼul Chatel became a king, as a vassal of Chan Ekʼ Hopet of Ucanal. The new king dedicated a new building and stelae in 849, overseen by Jewel Kʼawil, the king of Tikal, and Chan Pet, king of Calakmul. Watʼul Chatel built an innovative new temple-stelae arrangement to the south of the Central Plaza of Group A.

His last monument was erected in 889, almost 60 years after his accession.

== Depictions ==
On Stela 8 Watʼul Chatel wears jaguar claws on his hands and feet, together with other attributes of the Bearded Jaguar God.

Stela 9 depicts Watʼul Chatel with the attributes of the Maize God and describes him invoking the Vision Serpent, which he grasps in his hands.

Stela 10 depicts Watʼul Chatel dressed in Terminal Classic Maya style, although his foreign-looking face bears a moustache. The text on this stela displays the glyphs of Tikal, Calakmul and Motul de San José, describing how he received noble visitors from those cities.

Stela 11 describes the refounding of Seibal on 14 March 830 and the installation of Watʼul Chatel.
