= Akte =

Akte may refer to:

- Mount Athos, a mountain in northern Greece, known as Akte in Classical times
- Akte, a satellite archaeological site of Motul de San José, in Guatemala
