= Sak Muwaan =

- Ajaw

King of Motul de San José
- Reign: c.700-726
- Successor: Yajaw Te' K'inich
- Born: Motul de San José
- Died: 726; Motul de San José
- Issue: Yajaw Te' K'inich; Chuy-ti Chan (prince)
- Religion: Maya religion

Sak Muwaan was a king of the Maya city Motul de San José in Guatemala. He ruled sometime between 700 and 726.

An Ik-style vessel possesses a hieroglyphic text declaring that it was the property of Chuy-ti Chan, the son of Sak Muwaan. Chuy-ti Chan is described as an artist and ballplayer.

His successor was Yajaw Te' K'inich.
