= Sak Chʼeen =

Sak Chʼeen was a ruler of the Maya city-state of Motul de San José in Guatemala.

He is shown on one cylindrical vase. According to Mayanist David Stuart, the vase shows a ballgame between the kings of El Pajaral and Motul de San José. It has been proposed that the vase was created by the king of El Pajaral to commemorate the visit of Sak Chʼeen of Motul de San Jose.

He is depicted wearing a large yoke, painted deerskin hip guards, either fringed or "trimmed with feathers" and an extremely elaborate headdress. He is dropping onto his knee(pad) to strike the ball, which is exaggerated to huge proportions.
