= Seibal =

Archaeological site of the Maya civilization

Coordinates: 16°30′42″N 90°3′40″W

- El Ceibal
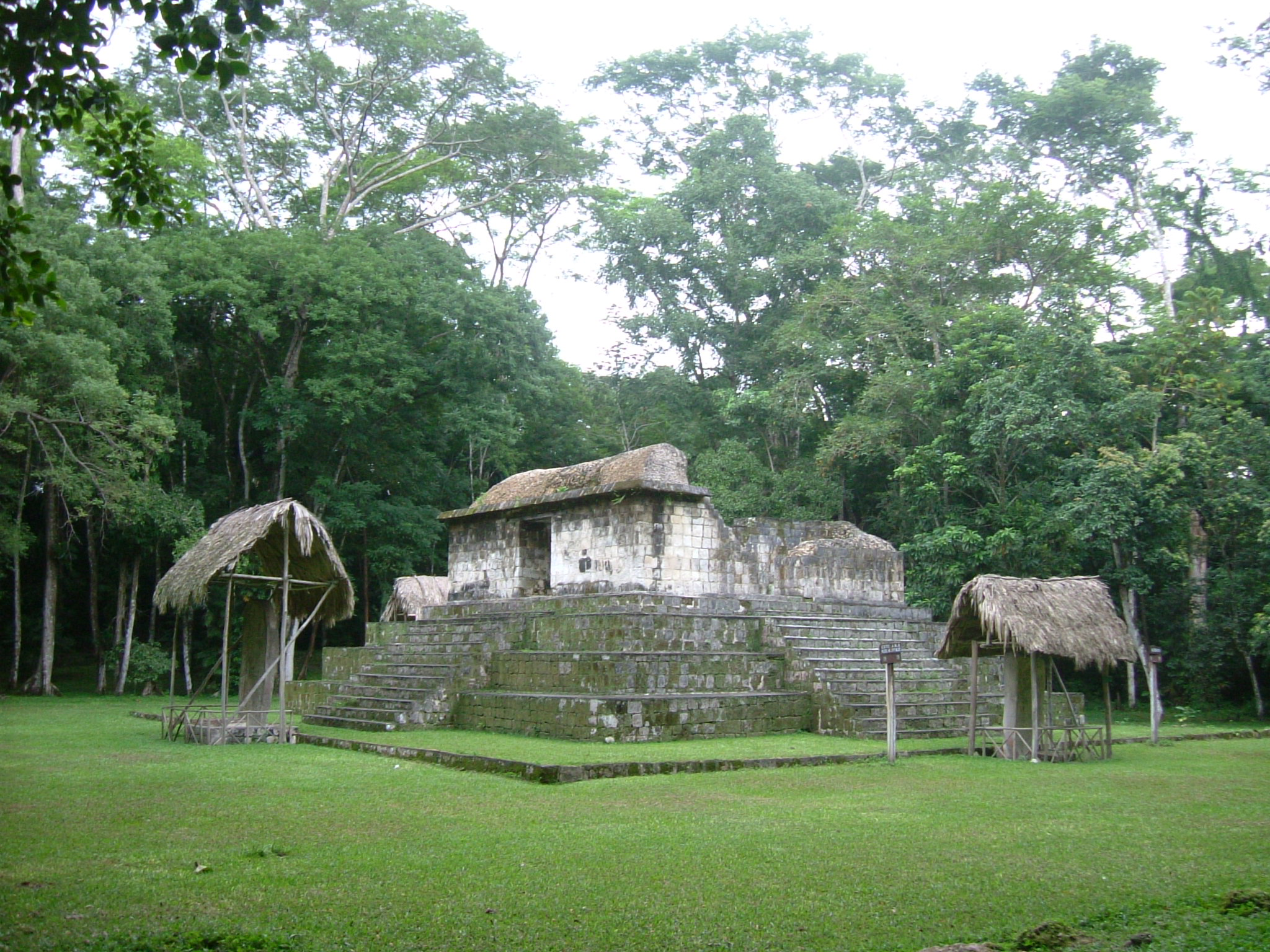
- Archaeological site of El Ceibal

- Location within Guatemala
- Type: Maya site
- Periods: Late Preclassic to late Classic
- Cultures: Maya
- Location: Sayaxché, Petén, Guatemala
- Region: Mesoamerica

History
- Built: 400 BC
- Abandoned: 950 AD

Site notes
- Condition: Ruins
- Current use: Archaeological site
- Governing body: Ministry of Culture and Sports (Guatemala)
- Management: Ministry of Culture and Sports

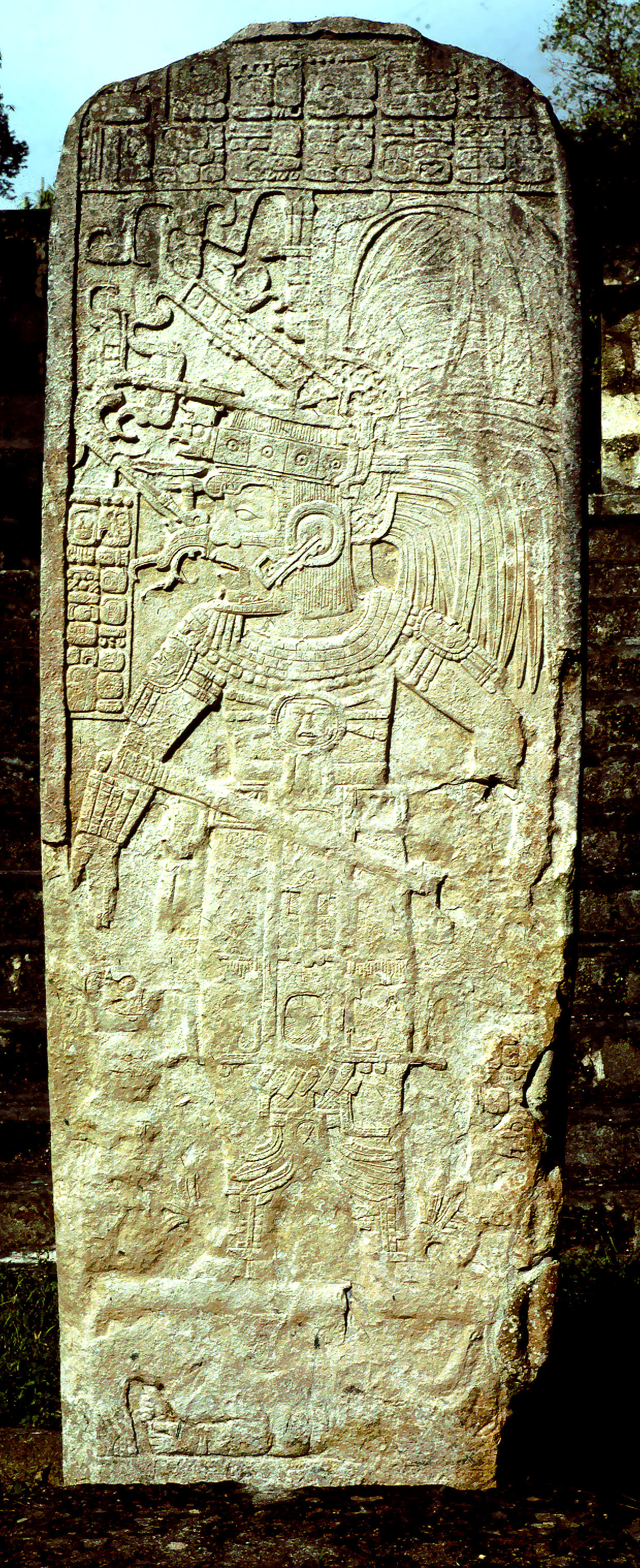
Stela 11 at Seibal.

Seibal (Spanish pronunciation: [sejˈβal]), known as El Ceibal in Spanish, is a Classic Period archaeological site of the Maya civilization located in the northern Petén Department of Guatemala, about 100 km SW of Tikal. It was the largest city in the Pasión River region.

The site was occupied from the Preclassic Period through to the Terminal Classic, with a significant hiatus. The principal phase of occupation dates to the Late Preclassic (400 BC – AD 200), followed by a decline in the Early Classic (AD 200–600). Seibal experienced a significant recovery in the Terminal Classic immediately prior to its complete abandonment, reaching its second peak from about 830 to 890, with a population estimated at 8–10,000 people. The dates on the stelae at Seibal are unusually late, with monuments still being dedicated after the Classic Maya collapse had engulfed most of the Petén region. Many of Seibal's late monuments show artistic influence from central Mexico and from the Gulf Coast of Mexico.

The early history of the site is lost due to the catastrophic defeat of the polity in AD 735 by the nearby Petexbatun kingdom with its capital at Dos Pilas, resulting in the destruction of its earlier sculpted monuments. Seibal was reduced to being a vassal state until the destruction of the Petexbatun kingdom in the late 8th century AD. In AD 830 a new elite installed itself at the site with the arrival of Wat'ul Chatel from Ucanal to the east. This new arrival reinvigorated Seibal and allowed it to last to the dawn of the 10th century, well after the Classic Maya collapse had engulfed most of the region.

== Etymology ==
Seibal is a corruption of the Spanish word ceibal, meaning "place where many ceiba trees grow". El Ceibal was the name of a lumber camp near the ruins at the time of their discovery. The change in spelling originated with a publication by Teoberto Maler in 1908, which used a German form with initial "s".

== Location ==
Seibal is located on bluffs about 100 metres (330 ft) above the Pasión River, a major tributary of the Usumacinta River. About 100 kilometres (62 mi) downstream, the Pasión River joins with the Salinas River to form the Usumacinta, which flows northwards to the Gulf of Mexico. The site lies in the Petén department of northern Guatemala, 16 kilometres (9.9 mi) east of the modern town of Sayaxché. Seibal lay 27 kilometres (17 mi) east of the Late Classic city of Dos Pilas and 100 kilometres (62 mi) south of Tikal. Lake Petén Itzá lies 60 kilometres (37 mi) to the north of the ruins.

Seibal lies among tropical rainforest on a limestone plain that is intermittently hilly and flat.

== Population ==
Surveys have revealed an average of 436 structures per square kilometer (1118 per square mile) in the site core, falling to 244 structures/km^{2} (626/square mile) in the periphery. At its height in the Late Preclassic, the population has been estimated at 1600 in the site core with a further 8000 dispersed through the periphery, to produce an estimated total population of almost ten thousand. In the Early Classic the population suffered a severe decline, population is estimated to have dropped to 34% of peak population. In the Late to Terminal Classic the population increased to 85% of its Late Preclassic level, an expansion that appears to have occurred rapidly and spread to all parts of the site, perhaps as the result of an influx of refugees arriving from other sites around AD 830. This was followed by a population crash to 14% of peak Preclassic population in the Early Postclassic (AD 900–1200) prior to the complete abandonment of the site.

== Social Stratification ==
The social stratification of Seibal was that of priest-kings, as well as nobility and elites living in the main ceremonial center, with the common people living in the peripheries of the city. During the 1964-68 excavations, 34 of the 45 found burials were from the peripheral zone, showing the distribution of population by class.

== Known rulers ==
All dates A.D.

Name	Title or nickname	Ruled
Yich'aak B'alam	"Jaguar Claw"	c.735–747+
Ajaw B'ot	Ruler D, Ah-Bolon-Abta	771–?
Wat'ul Chatel	Aj B'olon Haab'tal	830–889+

== History ==
The site was occupied by the Middle Preclassic, then declined from the Late Preclassic through to the Early Classic, with a renewed expansion in the Late to Terminal Classic before being completely abandoned.

=== Preclassic ===
Seibal was first settled around 900 BC in the Preclassic Period. It reached its peak population in the Late Preclassic around 200 BC, at the end of the Cantuse ceramic phase (300-200 CE). Ceramics from the deep Middle Preclassic levels at Seibal belong to the little-known Real/Xe phase, found in the western Petén region. A cruciform Olmec-style cache consisting of a bloodletter and jade celts is similar to those found in the Olmec heartland on the Gulf Coast of Mexico, and the artifacts were probably manufactured at La Venta. This cache dates to approximately 900 BC. After the Real/Xe complex, came the Escoba period, dating to approximately 600CE-300CE. The ceramics between these two periods are similar, but Escoba ceramics are more extensive and stratigraphically separated. There is also evidence during this time of the population increase that would peak at the end of the Cantutse period.

The earliest settlement in the Middle Preclassic was mostly confined to Group A. After 300 BC, in the Late Preclassic, settlement expanded to include Group D. During this period, there is evidence of ceremonial structures being built both in Group A and D.

By the end of the Late Preclassic (or Protoclassic), Seibal experienced an unexplained decline in population.

=== Early Classic ===
During the Early Classic, the decline that began in the Late Preclassic continued unabated until the site was all but abandoned around AD 300 for unknown reasons.

=== Late Classic ===
Seibal underwent a revival in the Late Classic with an expansion of occupation linked to the great city of Tikal. About AD 650 new inhabitants moved into the city in order to found a new kingdom. Groups A and D saw new construction, with a particular emphasis on Group D, which became an important part of the ceremonial centre. Any monuments raised by the Late Classic rulers responsible for this renewed occupation were defaced when the city suffered a catastrophic defeat in the 8th century AD. After the defeat of Seibal, foreign influences can be seen from Central Mexico in the art and stelae of the site dating to the Bayal phase (mid-700 CE-post-classic).

The earliest mention of Seibal in hieroglyphic inscriptions is on Stela 15 at Dos Pilas, dated to 13 October 721, and refers to Seibal becoming involved in the long-running war between the great cities of Tikal and Calakmul and their respective allies and vassals. Dos Pilas was a newly founded city in the Petexbatún region, established by Tikal to exert its control over the Pasión River, a strategy that backfired when Calakmul seized control of the fledgling kingdom.

==== Defeat ====
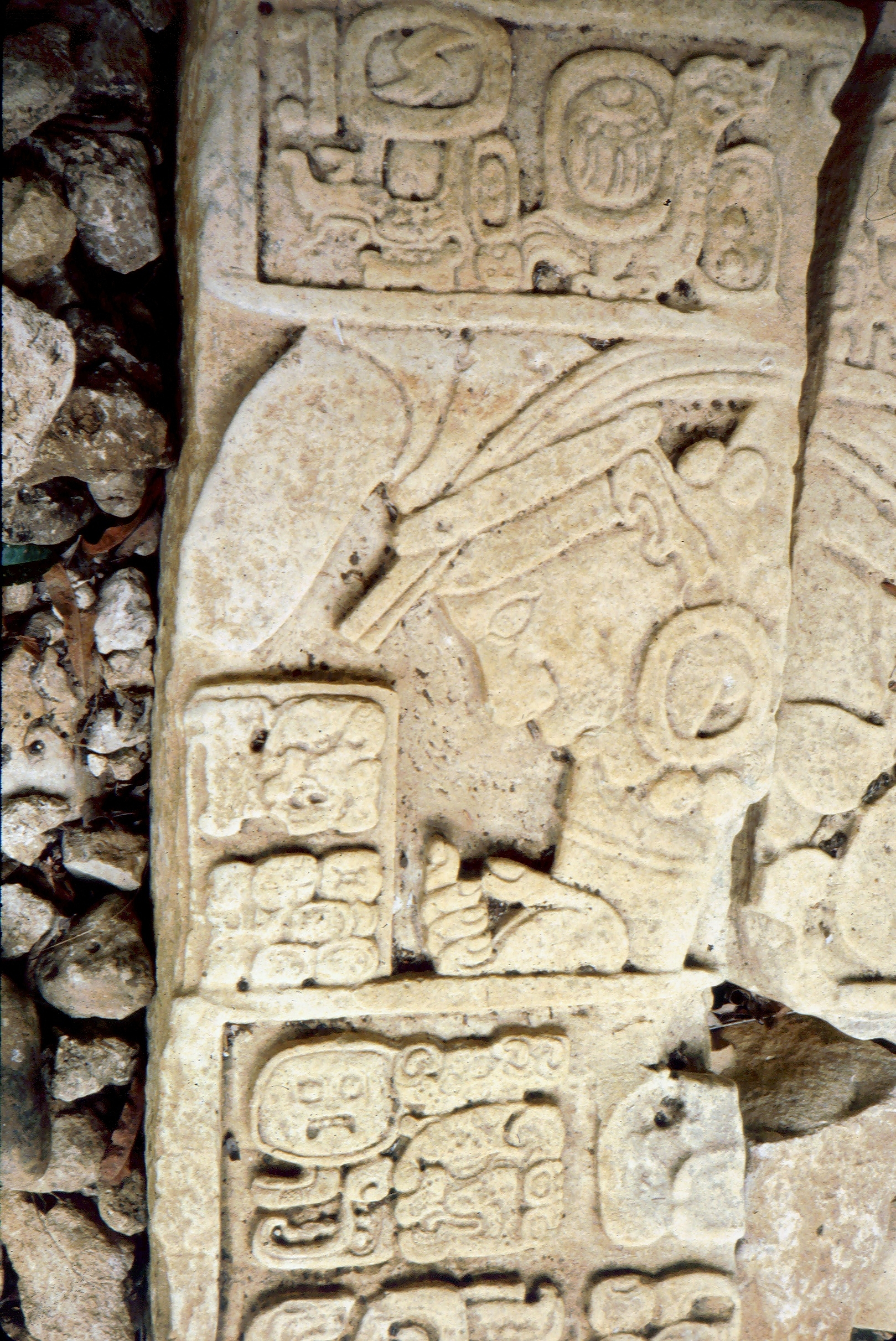
Part of relief at the base of Dos Pilas Stela 16 showing both the Seibal emblem glyph and the face of Yich'aak B'alam

In AD 735 Ucha'an K'in B'alam, the third king of Dos Pilas, attacked Seibal, capturing Yich'aak B'alam. The captive king was not executed but rather became a vassal of his more powerful neighbour. Ucha'an K'in B'alam raised monuments to his victory over Seibal at Dos Pilas, Aguateca and Seibal itself. Yich'aak B'alam is shown under the feet of Ucha'an K'in B'alam on Aguateca Stela 2. At Seibal a hieroglyphic stairway was built recording the city's new status as a vassal of Dos Pilas. At the same time as he erected these monuments to his victory, Ucha'an K'in B'alam ordered the destruction of the hieroglyphic records on the earlier monuments of Seibal, with inscriptions at Dos Pilas and Aguateca specifically recording the destruction of Seibal's previously recorded history using phrases that translate as "they destroyed the writing" and "they chopped the writing off the statues that were made".

Yich'aak B'alam continued as a vassal under the next king of Dos Pilas, K'awiil Chan K'inich, who presided over rituals at Seibal in 745 and 747.

Seibal regained its independence in the late 8th century with the destruction of the Dos Pilas kingdom. Ajaw B'ot acceded to the throne in AD 771, restoring Seibal as an independent capital. After AD 800 Seibal fell into a thirty-year hiatus during which no new monuments were erected.

=== Terminal Classic ===
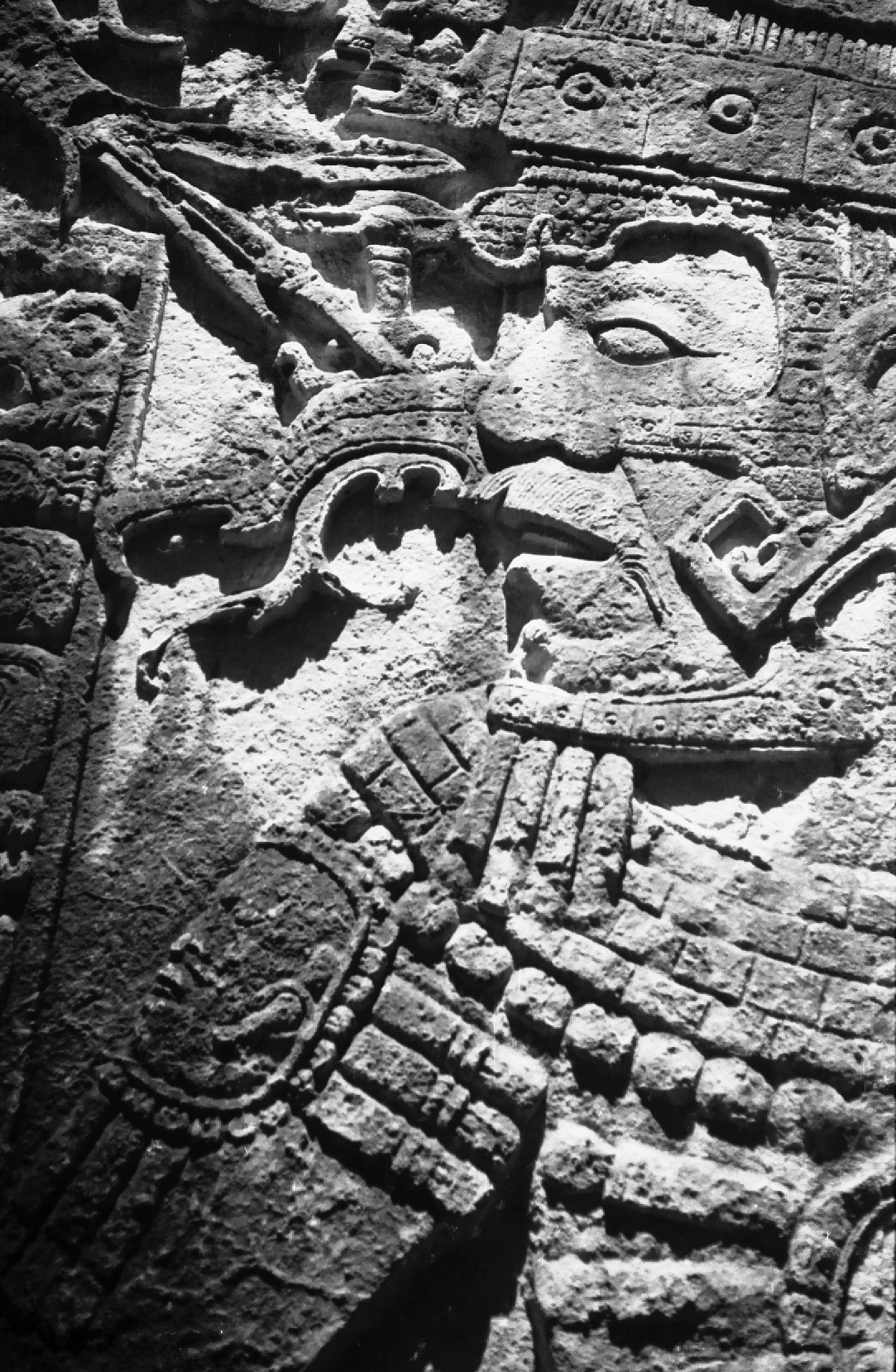
Detail of Stela 11 at Seibal, showing king Wat'ul Chatel.

With its independence came a new apogee, and for a brief time Seibal became a prominent regional capital located on the important Pasión River trade route. The architecture and ceramics from this period demonstrate connections with the northern Yucatán Peninsula and the Gulf Coast of Mexico. Seventeen stelae carved between AD 849 and 889 show a mix of Maya and foreign styles, including a lord wearing the beaked mask of Ehecatl, the central Mexican wind god, with a Mexican-style speech scroll emerging from the mouth, carvings of foreign-style foot slippers, and squared cartouches. Some of these stelae have a stylistic affinity with the painted murals at Cacaxtla, a site in the central Mexican state of Tlaxcala. This hybrid style seem to indicate that the new lords of Seibal were Maya lords adapting to changing political conditions by adopting a mix of symbols originating from both lowland Maya and central Mexican sources. Some of the more foreign-looking stelae even bear non-Maya calendrical glyphs. Changes at Seibal at this time are associated with the Chontal-controlled trade flowing along the Pasión River. The Chontal Maya themselves were warrior-merchants originating from the Gulf Coast of Mexico who displayed a mixture of Maya and non-Maya characteristics.

Hieroglyphic texts at Seibal indicate that the city's newly refound vigour was sponsored by a new alliance formed by the cities of Caracol and Ucanal in the east, two sites that had so far survived the spreading Classic Maya collapse. It is likely that they were attempting to reopen the old Pasión-Usumacinta trade route and were drawn to Seibal by its defensible location overlooking the Pasión River. Seibal's refounding took place in AD 830 with the installation of Wat'ul Chatel as a vassal of Chan Ek' Hopet of Ucanal. The new king dedicated a new building and stelae in 849, overseen by Jewel K'awil of Tikal, and Chan Pet, king of Calakmul. Wat'ul Chatel built an innovative new temple-stelae arrangement to the south of the Central Plaza of Group A. Structure A-3 consists of a low radial pyramid with an inventive arrangement of sculpted monuments.

Wat'ul Chatel's last monument was erected in 889. This stela is also the last dated monument raised at Seibal and by 900 the city was all but abandoned, the whole region had been engulfed by the Classic Maya collapse and trade no longer flowed along the Pasión-Usumacinta route. Most Classic Maya capitals had already been abandoned and whatever external support Seibal had received from its overlord had vanished. By 930 AD, the site was completely abandoned. It was left relatively undisturbed until around 1890 when Federico Artes was informed of the city's ruins.

The late stelae at Seibal show a marked reduction in quality over a span of about forty years, with the loss of Classic Period traits, and bearing flatter and cruder representations than earlier stelae. This may reflect the loss of expertise in the Terminal Classic, with craftsmen less able to work monuments and large structures as time progressed.

=== Modern history ===
The ruins of Seibal were probably discovered around 1890 by loggers working for the Hamett Mahogany Company. Federico Arthes, an owner of logging company Arthes and Sons, first reported the existence of the ruins of Saxtanquiqui, the Maya name of the site, in 1892 in a public article for the Guatemala City paper. He resided and did business in the Peten. The Guatemalan government nominated Senor Arthes Comisionado Especial to collect material to be displayed in the Guatemalan exhibit for the 1893 World's Columbian Exposition in Chicago. He was having very little luck getting satisfactory material at Tikal due to lack of available water for the plaster casting at which point he traveled to Saxtanquiqui with Gorgonio Lopez Toledo, a former assistant to Alfred Maudley. He took molds from some of the stelae and the resulting casts were displayed in the Exposition, bringing the recent discovery of the ruins to the attention of archaeologists for the first time. After the exposition closed, the casts were given to the Peabody Museum. Photographs of the stelae are still catalogued under the name "Sactankiki", the western spelling used by Maler after his expedition but a name he later wrote about with derision.

Two years later, in July 1895, Seibal was explored by Teoberto Maler on behalf of the Peabody Museum of Harvard University. He made a site plan and discovered a new stela to add to those already discovered. He returned to the site for further investigations in August 1905 but discovered no new monuments. The Peabody Museum published Maler's work in 1908, including good quality photos of the stelae.

Seibal was next investigated by Sylvanus Morley in 1914 on behalf of the Carnegie Institution of Washington. Dr Barnum Brown visited the ruins in 1948, and members of the Altar de Sacrificios Expedition of the Peabody Museum made visits in 1961, 1962 and 1963.

In 1964, the Peabody Museum returned to the site with a thorough investigation that continued until 1968, led by Gordon R. Willey as director and A. Ledyard Smith as field director. Further excavations were carried out from May to June in 2006 by the Proyecto Arqueológico Ceibal-Petexbatun (Seibal-Petexbatun Archaeological Project).

== Site description ==
Seibal is a medium-sized site. The site core is divided into three principal hilltop groups (Groups A, C and D) connected by causeways and covers a little over 1 km^{2}. The causeways were faced with masonry and had parapets in places. Causeway I is the western causeway, Causeway II is the south causeway and Causeway III is the eastern causeway. Group D is a fortress refuge concealed above the river frontage. Group B is a small complex located about 3 kilometres (1.9 mi) from the site core. Group A is smaller than Group D but has most of the sculptured monuments. Various small housemound groups lie beyond the site core. They are spaced between 50 and 100 metres (55 and 109 yd) apart, extending for several kilometers to the north, south and west.

Only two structures have been restored at Seibal, the A-3 temple platform and the C-79 circular platform, topped with the Jaguar Altar. Both were restored during the investigations carried out by the Peabody Museum in the 1960s.

Seibal possesses a satellite site located to the north, known as El Anonal. This site has large structures built from clay that date to the Middle Preclassic period.

The following table summarizes the spatial organization, architectural density, and ceremonial-defensive functions across the primary hilltop groups at Seibal:

Spatial and Architectural Profile of the Primary Site Groups at Seibal
Site Group	Topographic Setting & Access	Structure Density & Plazas	Primary Architectural & Sculptural Features	Structural Function
Group A	Western terminus of Causeway I on an elevated plateau	Over 50 mounds surrounding North, South, and Central Plazas	Radial pyramid Structure A-3, Structure A-10 (28 m tall), ballcourt A-19, and Terminal Classic carved stelae	Administrative and primary ceremonial core of the polity.
Group C	Situated along Causeway II ending at Structure C-79	Over 40 mounds lining the causeway axis	Circular three-tiered platform (Structure C-79) and associated crouched-jaguar altar	Sacred ritual complex with central Mexican stylistic influences.
Group D	Eastern terminus of Causeway III perched on steep bluffs above the Pasión River	Compact layout with over 70 structures around 5 plazas	Defensible perimeter, 20-meter-high stepped pyramid, and single plain stela	Fortress refuge and riverine trade control complex.

== Architecture ==
Group A is in the site core. It features three plazas, the North, South and Central Plazas and lies at the west end of Causeway I. Group A has more than fifty mounds arranged around the three plazas. Monuments dating to the period when Seibal was a vassal of Dos Pilas (AD 735–761) are situated in the Central Plaza of the group. In this group, there is also a ball court that is dated to the Terminal Classic and stylistically resembles that at Uxmal.

Group C lies on Causeway II, which passes through it to end at the circular Structure C-79. Group C has over forty mounds.

Group D is a compact group at the east end of Causeway III, it is perched in an easily defensible position at the edge of the bluffs overlooking the Pasión river. It has more than seventy structures crowded around five plazas. Group D only had one stela, which was a plain monument erected in front of a 20-metre (66 ft) high stepped pyramid.

The East Patio of Group A is part of an acropolis complex located behind Structure A-14. The complex is situated upon a massive platform raised almost 7 metres (23 ft) above the natural surface level. The patio was accessed by a stairway on the south side. It includes Structures A-15 and A-16.

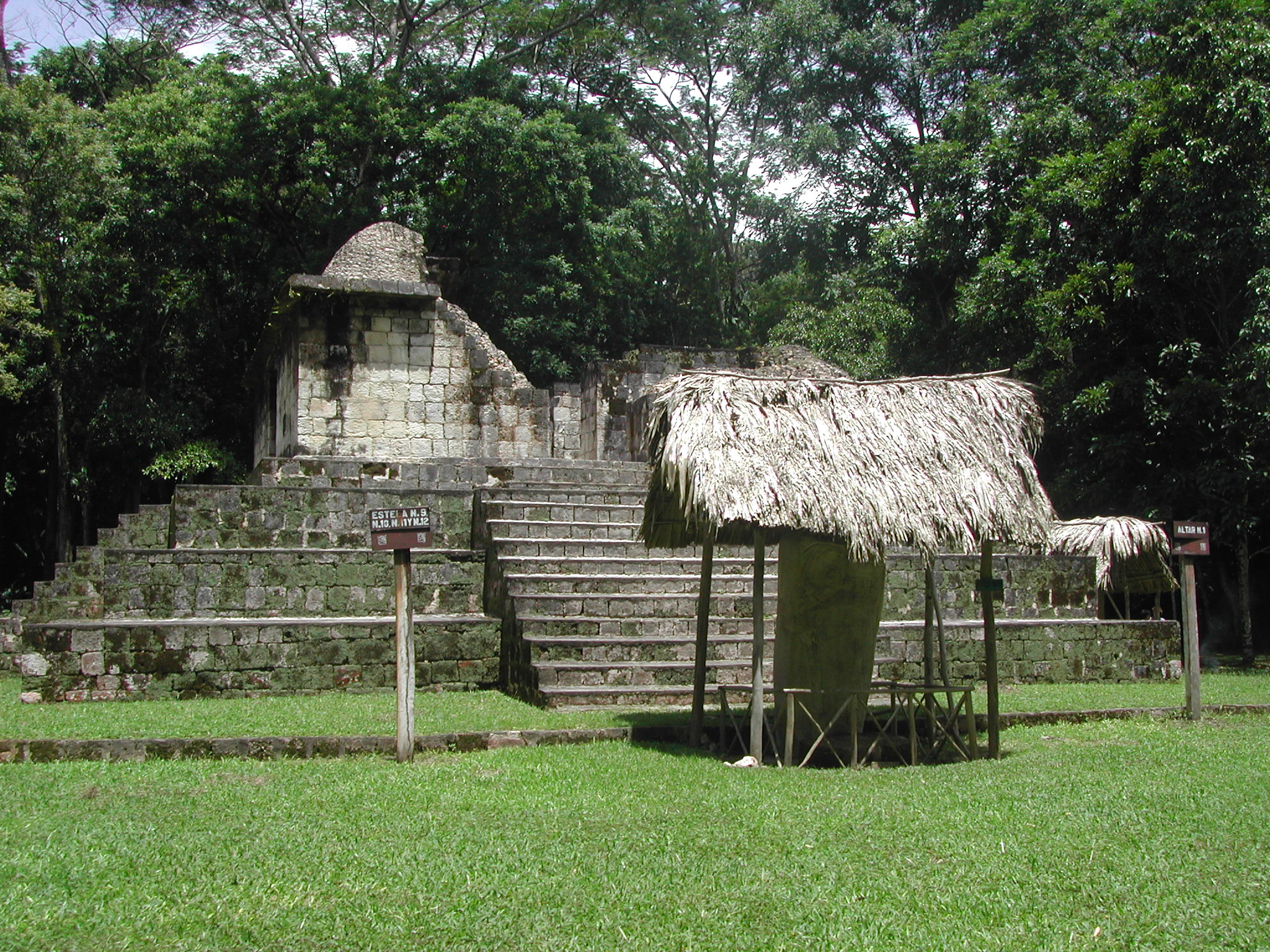
Structure A-3

Structure A-3 is a temple platform located in the centre of the south plaza. It has a stairway ascending each of its four sides. Five stelae are associated with this structure, one located at the base of each stairway and a fifth inside the building surmounting the platform. Three large jade cobbles were interred under the central stela. This structure and its associated stelae were dedicated in AD 849 by king Wat'ul Chatel (also known as Aj B'olon Haab'tal). Structure A-3 has the remains of a corbeled vault, the only surviving example at Seibal. The arrangement of the radial pyramid with its associated stelae was highly innovative. The radial temple form was ancient in the Maya region, dating back to the Late Preclassic, but Wat'ul Chatel placed upon it a square shrine with four doors, one opening onto each of the stairways. The temple building contained three vaulted chambers oriented north–south, with doors joining each chamber along an east–west axis. The cornice of the temple supported a brightly coloured stucco frieze. The frieze collapsed with the temple in ancient times. Archaeologists were able to recover portions of the fallen frieze and attempt a reconstruction of how it originally appeared. Each of the four doors was originally topped by a larger-than-life sculpture of king Wat'ul Chatel. Twelve smaller figures were spaced around the cornice, one at each corner with an additional figure positioned half-way between each corner and the central figure of the king. It is not known who these smaller figures represented. The spaces between the figures were occupied by panels with cross-hatch designs and sculpted vegetation and animals. Old gods sat in the centre of each of the sixteen panels, including Itzamna and Pawatun. Structure A-3 was built over an earlier platform structure.

Structure A-10, a 28-metre (92 ft) tall temple-pyramid, is the tallest structure at the site.

Structure A-13 is a radial pyramid. Excavations uncovered a mass burial (Burial 4) with parts of eleven people, including two women and a child. This was not a traditional Classic Maya burial and has been dated to AD 930, very late in the occupation of the site.

Structure A-14 is covered by the forest that has overgrown the northern part of the Central Plaza. It is a range structure running north–south and once had a hieroglyphic stairway detailing Seibal's defeat by Dos Pilas, although the inscriptions have now been removed to the old project camp. The structure was found to contain an elite female burial, labelled as Burial 1.

Structure A-15 is located on the north side of the East Patio of the North Plaza. It is a long, low structure running east–west and closing the patio on the north side. It measures 24 by 8 metres (79 by 26 ft) by 1.5 metres (4.9 ft) tall. The building contained a long room with a wide entrance opening southwards onto the patio, raised from the patio by a step. The room contained a stone bench built from reused blocks. The structure was superimposed upon two earlier substructures, the earliest of which had a different orientation to the final building. All three periods of construction appear to date to the Terminal Classic, with the last phase perhaps dating to about the time of the fall of the city.

Structure A-16 is located on the northeast side of the East Patio of the North Plaza. It is a rectangular structure measuring 16 by 10 metres (52 by 33 ft), running north–south and facing to the west. The remains of the structure stand 2.7 metres (8.9 ft) high. The western side of the building had been damaged by looters prior to archaeological investigation. The looters' trench measured 5 by 0.8 metres (16.4 by 2.6 ft) by 3.5 metres (11 ft) deep and cut through the structure's floor, bench and rear wall but did not uncover any burials or offerings. Fallen limestone blocks and slabs reveal that the structure once had a corbel-vaulted chamber. Fragments of stucco were also recovered, they once made up a colourful frieze above the front of the building that included modelled human figures. The stucco still had traces of orange, green and yellow paint. The building was a palace-type structure with perhaps six rooms, three on the west side and three on the east, and it was originally roofed in stone. The interior had an L-shaped bench. The structure was built of finely cut limestone blocks and the walls were coated with stucco painted orange and turquoise. It is believed that the building was part of a Terminal Classic royal palace with architectural features similar to those of the temple Structure A-3.

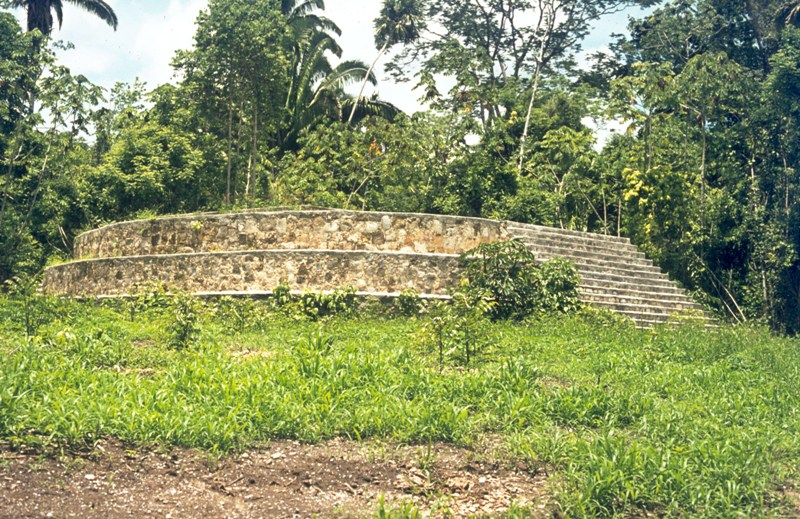
The unusual circular structure C-79.

Structure A-19 and Structure C-9 are ballcourts. They have a resemblance to ballcourts at Chichen Itza. Both ballcourts are aligned east–west, an unusual feature in the Maya area, although the topography of the site severely restricted the layout of the city to a principally east–west orientation. Ballcourt A-19 lies on the west side on the north plaza.

Structure C-79 is a circular three-tiered platform built during the Terminal Classic on top of a pre-existing structure dating to the Late Preclassic Period. Circular structures such as this have their origin in central Mexico, where they are typically temples of Ehecatl, the god of wind. However, the structure at Seibal was surmounted by a rectangular building platform, whereas the temple buildings of Ehecatl were also circular. Structure C-79 has two stairways, the larger ascends the west side, the smaller is on the east side. A circular jaguar altar rests on three pedestals before the structure, two of these are crouching figures that originally supported the altar, the third central column is modern and was put in place as an additional support during restoration of the ruins. The altar has the crude representation of a jaguar's head carved onto its edge. Structure C-79 and the associated altar are dated to about AD 870.

== Monuments ==
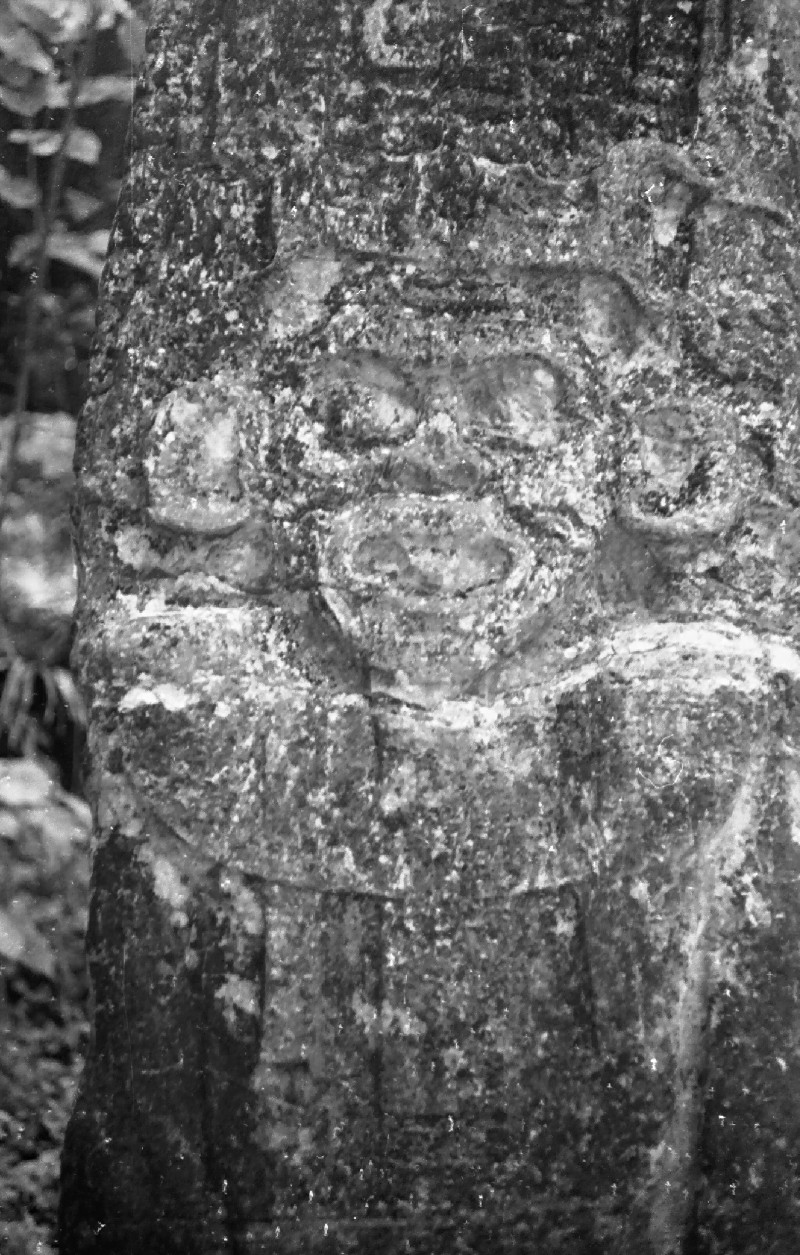
Stela 2 at Seibal

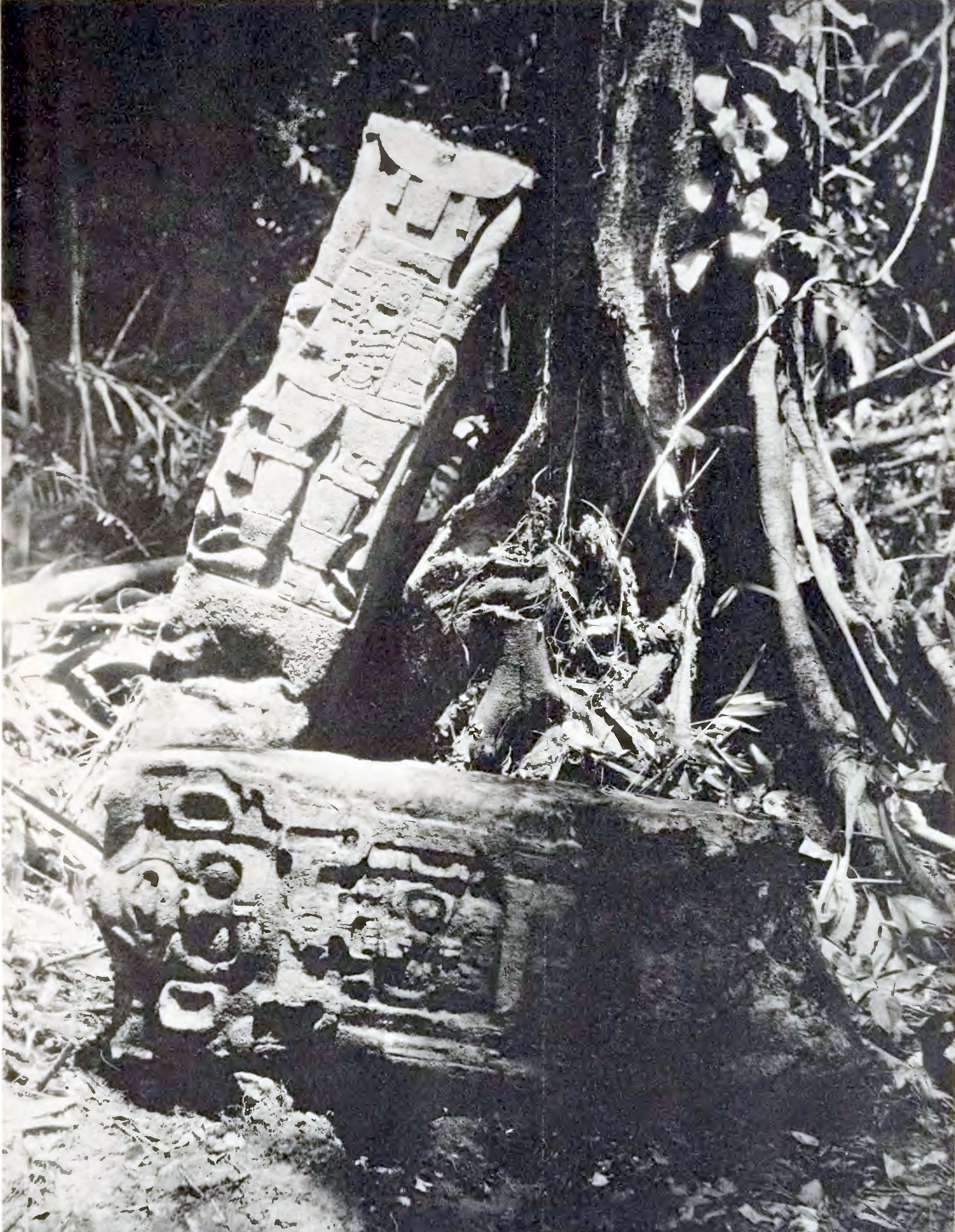
Stela 2 as photographed by Teoberto Maler in the early 20th century

The monuments of Seibal include a number of stelae, carved stone shafts, often sculpted with figures and hieroglyphs. The monuments at Seibal are fashioned from a hard limestone, accounting for their generally excellent preservation. During excavations in the 1960s, 57 stelae were identified. Of these 22 were sculpted and 35 were plain.

Hieroglyphic Stairway 1 was located on the front of Structure A-14. The stairway was installed by king Ucha'an K'in B'alam of Dos Pilas to record Seibal's status as a vassal after its defeat by that city. The stones are no longer in situ, having been removed to the area of the camp of the old archaeological project.

Stela 1, on the north side of the South Plaza near Structure A-3, names someone called "Knife-Wing", who is also known at distant Chichen Itza. It is dated to AD 869.

Stela 2 is believed to date to around AD 870 although it bears no hieroglyphic text. It depicts the frontal view of a masked figure and is the only monument at Seibal to show a frontal portrayal. It was broken into six or seven pieces and has been restored.

Stela 3 bears a non-Maya calendrical date, one of the glyphs is cipactli, a crocodile head used to represent the first day of the 260-day calendar in central Mexico. This stela once stood next to Stela 2 but was removed to a museum in Guatemala City.

Stela 4 is badly damaged, having been broken into pieces by a falling tree. It was lost for sixty years before being rediscovered. It currently remains buried under a thin covering of soil.

Stela 5 lies to the north of the South Plaza and is badly damaged. The broken middle section of the stela is all that is left, it bears the representation of a ballplayer and dates to about AD 780.

Stela 6 is slightly to the north of Stela 5, bearing hieroglyphic text. This stela was damaged in antiquity when the upper part was broken off and erected by an altar nearby.

Stela 7 stands to the north of stelae 5 and 6. It is in a reasonable state of preservation and bears the image of a ruler dressed as a ballplayer. This monument was probably dedicated in AD 780, although it records the accession of a king of Seibal in AD 771.

Stela 8 is a well-preserved monument on the south side of Structure A-3. Here king Wat'ul Chatel wears jaguar claws on his hands and feet, together with other attributes of the Bearded Jaguar God. In one hand the king holds the head of the god K'awiil. The text describes a visitor named Hakawitzil, an early form of Jacawitz, the name of one of the patron gods of the Postclassic K'iche' Kingdom of Q'umarkaj in the Guatemalan Highlands. Schele and Mathews propose that the event depicted on this stela gave rise to the foundation legends of the K'iche' people.

Stela 9 was erected on the west side of Structure A-3. It is badly damaged and one section is missing. The stela depicts Wat'ul Chatel with the attributes of the Maize God and describes him invoking the Vision Serpent.

Stela 10 is on the north side of Structure A-3. It depicts Wat'ul Chatel, dressed in Terminal Classic Maya style, although his foreign-looking face bears a moustache, which is not a typically Mayan characteristic. The text on this stela displays the emblem glyphs of Tikal, Calakmul and Motul de San José, describing how he received visitors from those cities. Among the visitors are named Kan-Pet of Calakmul and Kan Ek' of Motul. Wat'ul Chatel wears a headdress associated with the patron gods of Seibal, the heron god and K'awiil, deities that were also the patrons of Palenque. This appears to be an attempt by this foreign king to identify himself more closely with the city he came to rule.

Stela 11 is on the east side of Structure A-3 and describes the refounding of Seibal on 14 March 830 and the installation of its new lord, Wat'ul Chatel, as a vassal of Chan Ek' Hopet of Ucanal. A panel beneath the portrait of the ruler depicts a bound captive. The hieroglyphic inscription describes how Wat'ul Chatel arrived with his palanquins and his patron deities.

Stela 13 stands a little to the west of the South Plaza. It dates to AD 870.

Stela 14 dates to about AD 870 and stands at the junction of two causeways and is in a good state of preservation. It has stylistic similarities with sculptures at distant Chichen Itza in the extreme north of the Yucatán Peninsula.

Stela 18 is one of the last stelae to be erected at Seibal, it lies 20 metres (66 ft) west of the group of monuments consisting of Stelae 5, 6 and 7.

Stela 19 demonstrates the foreign influences prevalent at Seibal during the Late Classic. It depicts a lord wearing a mask representing the central Mexican wind god Ehecatl.

Stela 20 stands to the west of the South Plaza. It was one of the last monuments to be erected at Seibal, dating to AD 889.

Stela 21 is located inside the chamber at the top of Structure A-3. This stela was badly damaged when the vaulted chamber collapsed on top of it and has also suffered from erosion. The monument has been restored and depicts the lord of Seibal Wat'ul Chatel bearing a manikin sceptre. Like Stela 8, the king wears attributes of the Bearded Jaguar God, although without the jaguar claws. The king holds a K'awiil sceptre raised in his right hand, from his other hand hangs a shield with the face of the sun god. The inscription on the monument is largely illegible.

== See also ==
- Punta de Chimino
