= Itzamnaaj Bahlam of Ucanal =

17th century king that ruled in Guatemala

Itzamnaaj Bahlam was a Maya king of Ucanal in Guatemala in the late seventh century.

He is mentioned on Naranjo Stela 22 as having had his city burned on September 4, 698 by the forces of K'ak' Tiliw Chan Chaak, the ten-year-old king of Naranjo. On the front of this same stela he is shown nearly nude except for a loincloth, and with his hands tied and reaching up in supplication, groveling in front of and below the Naranjo king. The accompanying text states that this is a scene corresponding to the January 26, 702, suggesting that Itzamnaaj Bahlam may have been held a prisoner at Naranjo for over three years.

Ucanal Stela 6 is badly eroded but the name of Itzamnaaj Bahlam can be seen at Glyph A4a. The date on this monument cannot be read but stylistically the stela fits better in the late eighth century than in the late seventh century, and it seems more likely that this monument refers to a later Ucanal king of the same name.

A more likely connection to this Itzamnaaj Bahlam comes from one looted vase. This vase, painted in Naranjo style by one of the artists in the court of K’ahk’ Tiliw Chan Chahk, bears the name of Itzamnaaj Bahlam, who carries the K’an Witznal Ajaw - title of the kings of Ucanal. These considerations make it almost certain that this is the same Ucanal king who was defeated by Naranjo. The big question remains as to whether this vase was painted for the Ucanal lord before Naranjo's attack, in which case there was obviously a major deterioration in the relationship between Naranjo and Ucanal between 688 and 698, or whether it was given after the defeat as a gift to a now compliant vassal lord.
