= Yajaw Teʼ Kʼinich =

King of Motul de San José in Guatemala

- Ajaw
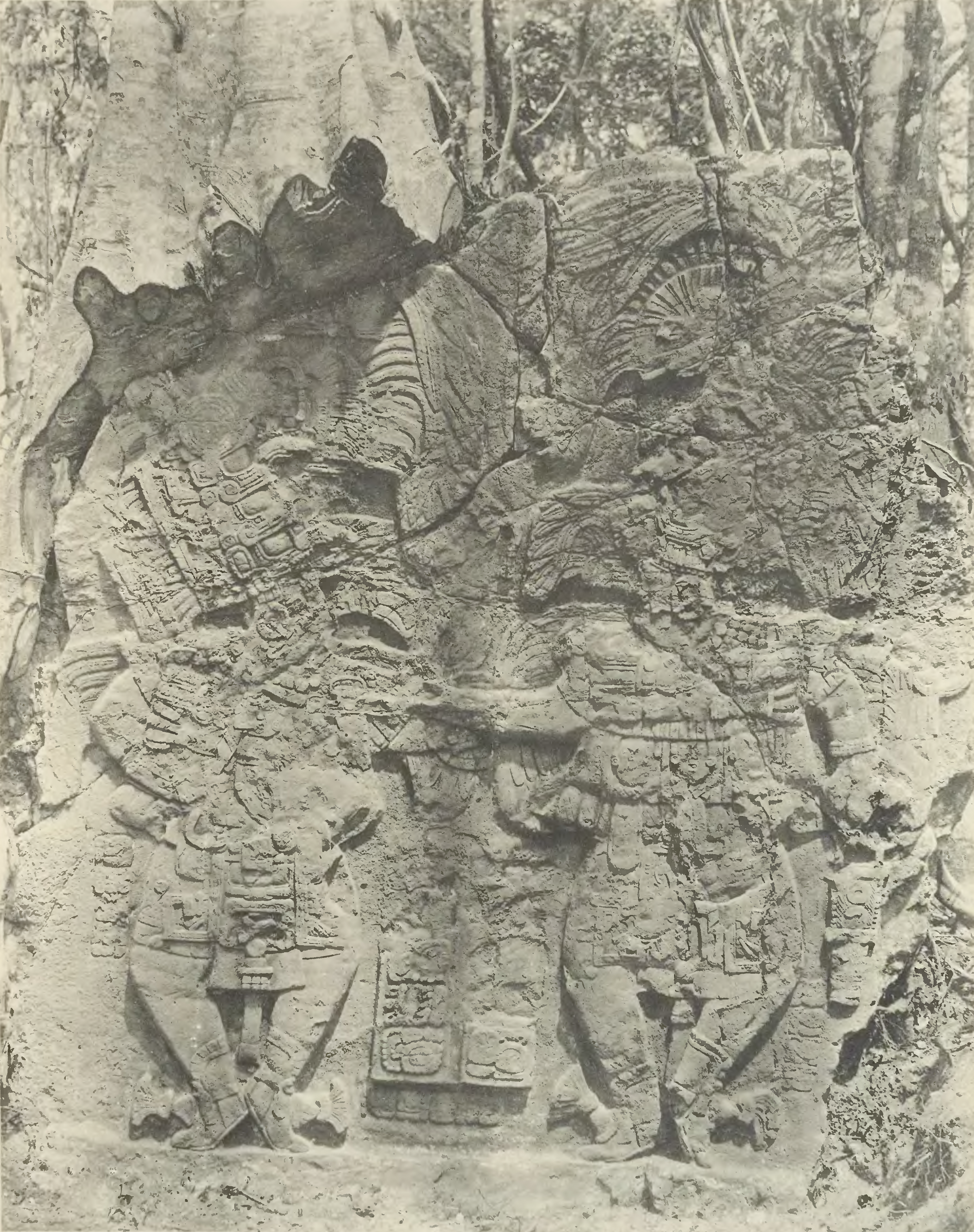
- Detail of Stela 2 of Motul de San José, which represents the monarch.

King of Motul de San José
- Reign: c.726-755
- Predecessor: Sak Muwaan
- Successor: Lamaw Ekʼ
- Born: Motul de San José
- Died: c.755 Motul de San José
- Father: Sak Muwaan
- Religion: Maya religion

Yajaw Teʼ Kʼinich was a Maya king of city-state Motul de San José in Guatemala. He ruled c. 725–755.

He was a successor and possibly son of Sak Muwaan.

His artist is named on the ceramics as Tʼuubal Ajaw, Lord of Tʼuubal.

Yajaw Teʼ Kʼinich is depicted on one Ik-style vessel wearing a mask and dancing, he is also depicted on Stelae 2 and 6 in the site core. He is recorded on one vessel as possibly having died in AD 755.

His successor was Lamaw Ekʼ.
