= Ajaw Bʼot =

8th century Mayan king

Ajaw Bʼot, also known as Ah-Bolon-Abta or Ruler D, was king of the Maya city of Seibal (in present-day Guatemala) during the 8th century.

== Biography ==
Ajaw Bʼot acceded to the throne on January 20, 771, restoring Seibal as an independent capital. It is unknown when he died.
