= Ucanal =

Archaeological site of Maya civilization

Coordinates: 16°19′N 90°06′W

Ucanal is an archaeological site of the ancient Maya civilization. It is located near the source of the Belize River in the Petén department of present-day northern Guatemala.

== Location ==
Ucanal is located inside a bend of the Mopan River. It is accessed via the highway from Flores to Melchor de Mencos, and is near the village of Tikalito. It is 51 miles (82 km) south of Tikal.

== History ==
Ucanal was located in a strategic location near the source of the Belize River.

The ancient name of the Ucanal polity was K'anwitznal, and one of its first rulers was Ajaw K'uk' or Lord Quetzal. The city had strong ties with Tikal and, in the 7th century AD, with Caracol. Ucanal was attacked by the Kalomte queen-regent, Wac' Chanil Ahau or Lady Six Sky of Naranjo (Saal) in September and December of 693; and on 1 February 695 Ucanal's lord Kinich Cab ("Shield-Jaguar") was captured by the ruler of Naranjo. Kinich Cab was held at Naranjo until 22 June 712; Ucanal was reduced to the status of vassal of that city.

In 800 CE, lord Hok K'awil of Caracol captured the lord of Ucanal. Over the next decades, a Maya-speaking, ethnically mixed Nahua/Maya Putun people filled the power vacuum in Ucanal. These people did not worship the Feathered Serpent Kukulcan. In 830 CE, lord Chan Ek' Hopet installed Wat'ul Chatel as his vassal over Seibal, and commemorated it upon Stele 11 there.

One of the rulers of Ucanal was Itzamnaaj Bahlam of Ucanal.

== Site ==
The site has archeological evidence of two artificial irrigation channels: one is 420 metres (1,380 ft) long and the other is 370 metres (1,210 ft) long, both channels are 7 metres (23 ft) wide. There are 114 structures in the main area and at least 150 residential groups. The protected area covers 1 square mile (2.6 km^{2}) but does not include all the minor groups. There are several temples and palaces, and two ballcourts. Many of the stelae were destroyed by invaders from Naranjo (Saal). There are 22 stelae and 16 altars.
