= Motul de San José =

Ancient Maya site in northern Guatemala

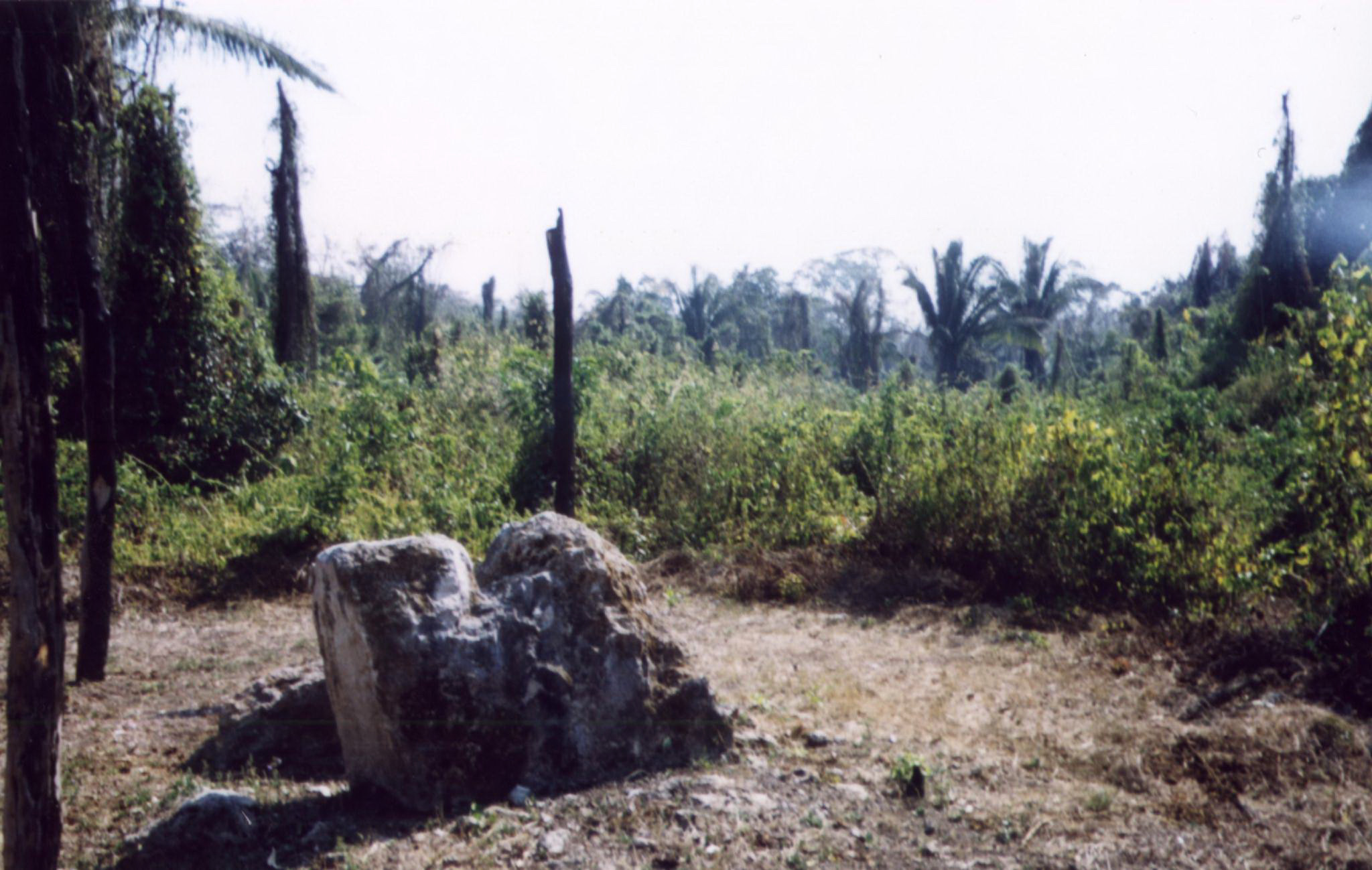
- A badly fire-damaged stela in Group C

- Location within Guatemala today
- 17°1′35″N 89°54′5″W
- Periods: Middle Preclassic to Early Postclassic
- Cultures: Maya
- Location: San José
- Region: Petén Department, Guatemala

Site notes
- Architectural style: Classic Maya
- Excavation dates: 1998–2008
- Archaeologists: Antonia Foias, Kitty Emery Proyecto Arqueológico Motul de San José

Motul de San José is an ancient Maya site (known anciently as Ik'a', 'Windy Water') located just north of Lake Petén Itzá in the Petén Basin region of the southern Maya lowlands. It is a few kilometres from the modern village of San José, in Guatemala's northern department of Petén. A medium-sized civic-ceremonial centre, it was an important political and economic centre during the Late Classic period (AD 650–950).

The site was first settled between 600 and 300 BC, in the latter portion of the Middle Preclassic period, when it most likely was a fairly small site. This Maya city then had a long and continuous occupational history until the Early Postclassic, up to around AD 1250, with peaks in the Late Preclassic and Late Classic periods. Motul de San José had begun to refer to Tikal as its overlord in the late 4th century AD; by the 7th century it had switched its allegiance to Calakmul, Tikal's great rival, before returning its allegiance to Tikal in the early 8th century. In the late 8th century Motul de San José appears to have been conquered by Dos Pilas, capital of the Petexbatún kingdom.

Most natural resources were easily available in the immediate vicinity of the city. The nearby port at La Trinidad de Nosotros was an important hub for the import of exotic goods and export of local products such as chert and ceramics. Other goods not immediately available were likely to have been provided by the city's satellite sites. The local area provided a number of different soils suitable for varied agricultural use, and the port at La Trinidad de Nosotros provided the city with freshwater products such as turtles, crocodiles and freshwater molluscs. Deer were hunted locally and provided an important source of protein for the upper class, while freshwater snails were the main source of protein for commoners.

Motul de San José has been identified as the source of Ik-style polychrome ceramics bearing painted scenes of the Late Classic Maya aristocracy involved in a variety of courtly activities. The Ik-style was characterised by hieroglyphs painted in a pink or pale red colour, scenes with dancers wearing masks, and the realistic representation of subjects as they appeared in life. The city was the capital of a polity that included various satellite sites of varying importance, including a port on the shore of Lake Petén Itzá.

== Location ==
Motul de San José is located 3 kilometres (1.9 mi) from the north shore of Lake Petén Itzá, in the centre of the department of El Petén. The nearest town is Flores, 10.5 kilometres (6.5 mi) to the south, on the other side of the lake. The nearest villages are San José, 5 kilometres (3.1 mi) away, and San Andrés, 6.5 kilometres (4.0 mi) away, both are to the south of the site, on the northern shore of the lake. The archaeological site is connected to Nuevo San José, a northern expansion of San José, by a dirt road. It lies among land that has been cleared of forest within the last century and is now used to plant maize and graze cattle.

Motul de San José lies on a limestone plateau at the northern edge of the fault depression that underlies the central lakes of the Petén Basin. The local topography consists of ridges, generally running east–west or northeast–southwest alternating with lower-lying areas with clay soils. These low-lying areas tend to feed into drainage systems flowing into either Lake Petén Itzá itself or into the Akte River. The Kantetul River is a seasonal watercourse with its origin 5 kilometres (3.1 mi) to the northeast of the site and flowing westwards into the Akte River, passing 2 kilometres (1.2 mi) from the site core. The Akte River in turn flows west into the San Pedro River, which flows northwest into Mexico where it joins the Usumacinta River and ultimately empties into the Gulf of Mexico. A mixture of ancient and modern agricultural terraces line the riverbank, 2 kilometres (1.2 mi) north of the site core. Access to water was crucial for Maya cities, since much of the Maya lowlands have been described as a seasonal desert due to the combination of a prolonged dry season lasting between four and six months together with the limestone geography that makes surface water scarce. In addition the Maya greatly preferred water to land transport and used canoes to trade extensively by river and sea, and access to river routes connected cities to extensive trade routes.

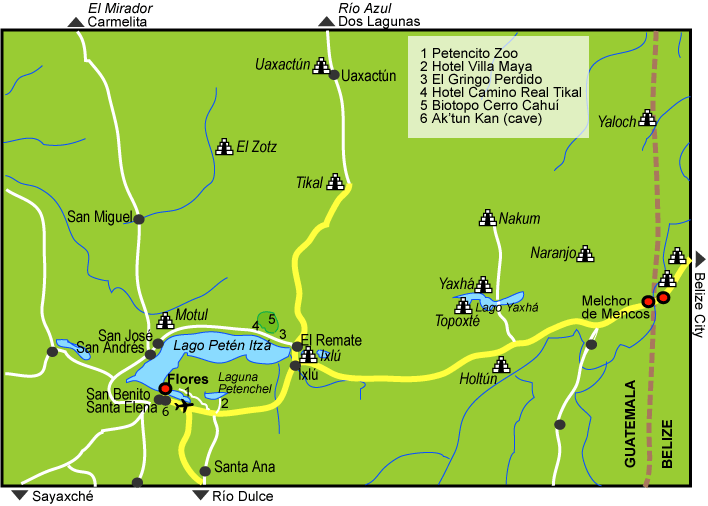
Map of Lake Petén Itzá, showing the location of Motul de San José near the northern shore

Motul de San José lies within a dense cluster of smaller satellite sites. It is 32 kilometres (20 mi) to the southwest of the major Classic Period ruins of Tikal. The site is about 275 kilometres (171 mi) north of Guatemala City. The ruins are located on a hill about 180 metres (590 ft) above mean sea level.

The site forms part of the Motul Ecological Park (Parque Ecológico Motul in Spanish), which is administered by Instituto de Antropología e Historia (IDAEH), the Guatemalan Institute of Anthropology and History), the University of San Carlos of Guatemala (USAC) and the local communities of San José and Nuevo San José. The park covers an area of approximately 2.2 square kilometres (0.85 sq mi).

== Emblem glyph ==
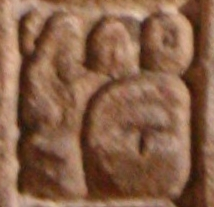
Glyph from Yaxchilan Lintel 15 meaning "Lady of Ik"

Maya cities and kingdoms in the Classic Period were identified in hieroglyphic texts by a distinctive emblem glyph; they are essentially royal titles composed of three distinct parts – the glyphs representing k'uhul and ajau (meaning "divine" and "lord") followed by the name of the polity this person ruled over. The decipherment of emblem glyphs was crucial to the interpreting the political makeup of Classic Period Maya civilization.

The emblem glyph of Motul de San José contains the main sign ik, "breath" or "wind". It is found on monuments and ceramics from the 8th and 9th centuries. A vessel bearing this emblem and depicting king Lamaw Ek' was found as far away as Altar de Sacrificios. Analysis has revealed that it was manufactured in Motul de San José, indicating some form of interaction between these distant sites.

== Economy ==
The majority of basic natural resources were readily available in the immediate vicinity of the city, with local soils being suitable for the production of maize and mixed crops to support the local populace. The subsidiary site of La Trinidad de Nosotros, located on the shore of Lake Petén Itzá some 2.6 kilometres (1.6 mi) southeast of the site core, appears to have been an important port for the import and export of goods to and from Motul de San José. Food resources not available in the immediate vicinity of the city were probably provided by the satellite sites dispersed at some distance from the site core, and La Trinidad is likely to have played an important part in supplying exotic goods to the city as well as freshwater foodstuffs such as crocodiles, fish and turtles. Chert nodules were locally available from the first ridges to the north of the lake. A chert workshop has been discovered in the northern sector of Motul de San José. Ceramic figurines were produced in the Acropolis palace complex in Group C and also in a medium-sized palace complex in Group B, an elite plaza in Group E and also in two elite plazas in the northern part of the site.

The small satellite site of Chak Maman Tok' several kilometers to the southwest of Motul de San José, appears to have been an important centre for the production of chert tools, with only a few other centres within the Maya lowlands manufacturing chert on such a scale. Although very small, Chak Maman Tok' probably played a major part within the economy of the Motul de San José polity.

Differences in architectural style between elite residential complexes and in the activities carried out at them suggest that the aristocracy of Motul de San José was divided into several distinct classes, including the royal family resident in Group C, royal courtiers and low to middle rank nobles.

The Kantetul River, although now seasonal, is reported to have been a navigable water channel until relatively recently. During the height of Motul de San José's power, it may have provided an important link to the San Pedro River, a significant trade route in ancient times.

== Ik style ceramics ==
Motul de San José is possibly the source of the so-called "Ik-style" painted polychrome ceramics, a theory that has recently received additional support from archaeological excavations at the site. These ceramic vessels, including finely painted plates and cylindrical vessels, were first associated with the then-unidentified site of Ik in the 1970s by the Emblem Glyph included in the hieroglyphic texts on them. The confirmation of Motul de San José as Ik came from investigations carried out from 1998 to 2004. Chemical analysis of Ik-style ceramics have revealed that they were not only produced in workshops in Motul itself but also in satellite sites in the vicinity.

The Ik-style ceramic corpus includes a set of features such as hieroglyphs painted in a pink or pale red colour and scenes with dancers wearing masks. One of the most distinctive features is the realistic representation of subjects as they appeared in life, something that is very rare in Mesoamerican art. The corpus is represented by more than 30 intact vessels, the majority of unknown provenance, which have been compared to ceramic fragments recovered from Motul de San José and its satellite sites. The subject matter of the vessels includes courtly life from the Petén region in the 8th century AD, such as diplomatic representations, feasting, bloodletting, scenes of warriors and the sacrifice of prisoners of war.

The variations in artistic style and chemical composition of the Ik-style ceramics suggests that they were produced in a number of workshops local to the Motul de San José area. They have been subdivided into five types, four from Motul de San José itself and one from one of its satellite sites. There are also various lower-quality examples that are presumed to have been manufactured in sites of lesser importance within the Motul de San José polity. The Ik-style ceramics are believed to have been produced in the period from 740–800 AD. In spite of differences, all the Ik-style ceramics are thought to have been made within a network of allied workshops dedicated to producing vessels for use in the banquets of the aristocracy of Motul de San José and of the petty nobility of the capital's satellites. The ceramics were distributed widely in the Maya region as gifts in order to seal alliances between the elites of various Maya kingdoms.

Of particular note is that chemical analysis of ceramic fragments has revealed that the very same workshops not only produced the highest-quality Ik-style polychrome ceramics but also general low-quality ceramics for household use. High quality Ik-style ceramics made at Motul de San José have been excavated from across the Maya region, including Tikal and Uaxactún to the northeast of the city, Copán far to the south, and Altar de Sacrificios, Tamarindito and Seibal, in western Petén.

A particularly rare feature found on Motul de San José ceramics is the so-called X-ray style, showing a figure wearing a mask but also portraying his face underneath it. All the other representations using this rare style are depicted on Late Classic sculptures at sites with which it is known that Motul de San José had contact at this time, including Dos Pilas, Machaquila, Tikal and Yaxchilan. This X-ray style has been found on at least nine painted vessels from Motul de San José and is also used on the west side of Stela 2.

== Occupation and diet ==
Motul de San José was occupied from the Middle Preclassic right through to the Early Postclassic. However, the height of the city's occupation was the Late Classic. Settlement density averages 250 structures per square kilometer (650 structures per square mile) in the site's monumental core, 125 structures per square kilometer (325 structures per square mile) in the city's suburban area and 79 structures per square kilometer (205 structures per square mile) in the site's periphery.

Motul de San José's likely resource catchment zone probably extended between 5 and 7 kilometres (3.1 and 4.3 mi) around the site core and included a number of satellite sites including Kantetul, La Trinidad de Nosotros, Akte, Buena Vista, Chachaklum and Chakokot. This region also includes two major water sources in the form of Lake Péten Itzá to the south and the Kantetul river 2 kilometres (1.2 mi) to the north. The area around the city included a variety of soils suitable for agriculture, with 20% of this being very fertile soil highly suited to agriculture, just over 50% of the area was very fertile but required high maintenance (consisting of either fertilization or crop rotation) and 14% being low fertility soil consisting of lowland clay and suitable only for maize or being left unfarmed. Soil analysis has revealed that maize was not only grown in peripheral areas but also close to residential areas throughout Motul de San José.

Archaeological investigations have revealed that the diet of the inhabitants of Motul de San José included dogs (Canis familiaris), turtles including pond sliders (Trachemys scripta) and Mesoamerican river turtles (Dermatemys mawii), freshwater snails (mostly Pomacea flagellata but also jute snails (Pachychilus spp.)), white-tailed deer (Odocoileus virginianus), red brocket (Mazama americana, a species of small deer), white-lipped peccary (Tayassu pecari), rabbits (Sylvilagus spp.), lowland pacas (Cuniculus paca), Central American agouti (Dasyprocta punctata) and nine-banded armadillos (Dasypus novemcinctus). Only the dog had been domesticated by the Late Classic Maya so the majority of protein in the diet of the inhabitants came from hunting and fishing within the catchment area around the city. The most common food animals were the white-tailed deer, river clam and river turtle. Some animal remains were recovered that were clearly associated with elite status occupation, such as those of the jaguar, the ocelot or other small feline and the crocodile (crocodilus spp.). These latter three appear more related to ritual and economic activity than nutritional needs. Freshwater snails were more an ingredient in the diet of lower status families while deer remains were associated with the elite residents of the city.

Among Motul de San José and its most important satellite La Trinidad de Nosotros, the majority of remains from Trinidad were from aquatic species, while at Motul de San José the majority were from terrestrial species. 10% of animal remains from Motul had been modified to form artefacts, compared with only 4% of animal remains at Trinidad. Artefact remains found at La Trinidad de Nosotros were more likely to be waste products from artefact manufacture while at Motul de San José they were more likely to be artefacts at the end of their usable life. Aquatic animal products arriving at Motul de San José were far more likely to be consumed by the elite than by commoners, whether used as food or to craft artefacts.

== History ==
=== Preclassic Period ===
==== Middle Preclassic ====
Motul de San José was first settled between 600 and 300 BC, in the latter portion of the Middle Preclassic period, when it was probably a fairly small site. At this time some of its satellite sites were also settled, including La Trinidad de Nosotros and Buena Vista, both of which would have been small villages at this time, and they may have been settled even earlier in the Middle Preclassic, between 800 and 600 BC.

==== Late Preclassic ====
Although investigation of Preclassic remains is difficult at Motul de San José due to the overlying Late Classic construction, it is evident that the site experienced major growth during the Late Preclassic (300 BC–AD 300) and became a sizeable centre. At roughly the same time, most of the major structures were built at Akte, and Chakokot experienced its earliest occupation during the Late Preclassic. In contrast, Buena Vista appears to have been lightly occupied. La Trinidad de Nosotros also underwent major expansion in the Late Preclassic and became larger and more important than Motul de San José, with its architectural layout being finalised in this period – later Classic period construction was superimposed upon pre-existing Late Preclassic structures.

=== Classic Period ===
Although Motul de San José had begun to refer to Tikal as its overlord in the late 4th century, by the 7th century various hieroglyphic texts mention that it was under the dominion of Calakmul, Tikal's greatest enemy, before again coming under the power of Tikal in the early 8th century.

==== Early Classic ====
Early Classic ceramic finds are scarce at Motul de San José and those that have been found were a minor component in mixed fill deposits. This suggests that Motul de San José was largely abandoned in the Early Classic. The best examples of Early Classic pottery come from outside of Motul de San José itself, with several complete ceramic vessels being recovered during the construction of a modern language school in Trinidad de Nosotros and some fragments of Early Classic pottery being retrieved from a looted chultun at Wakutal.

In the late 4th century Motul de San José began to refer to Tikal as its overlord.

==== Late Classic ====
Motul de San José experienced its second major peak in occupation during the Late Classic period, between AD 600 and AD 830. Most of the major architecture at the site was built during this surge in activity and the city reached its maximum size. Motul de San José became one of the three most important cities around Lake Petén Itzá and was approximately the same size as Tayasal, while it was slightly smaller than Nixtun Ch'ich'. There was renewed growth in the city's satellite sites, Chakokot reached its peak population and most of its residential complexes were built in the Late Classic. Buena Vista experienced only light occupation at this time. Major construction work took place at Akte including the building of the principal platform and its causeway. It also appears that the rulers of Akte erected several stelae. La Trinidad de Nosotros took on its final form and most of its major architecture was built at this time including the Mesoamerican ballcourt, the major residential complexes, four plazas and the port facilities.

In the 8th century AD the city had important relationships with Maya cities to the southwest, especially in the Petexbatún region, and on the Pasión and Usumacinta rivers, including Seibal (on the Pasión), Altar de Sacrificios (near where the Pasión becomes the Usumacinta), and Dos Pilas, Aguateca, Tamarindito, Arroyo de Piedra and Cueva de Sangre (all five in the Petexbatún region). It is possible that the widespread distribution of Ik-style ceramics in elite tombs at sites in the Petexbatún region may be linked to the military defeat of Motul de San José by Dos Pilas, with these high quality ceramics forming a part of the tribute payment made to the Petexbatún kingdom. After its defeat at the hands of the Petexbatún kingdom, Motul de San José no longer erected sculpted stelae but the history of the site continued to be recorded to a certain extent in texts on Ik-style ceramics.

===== Politics =====
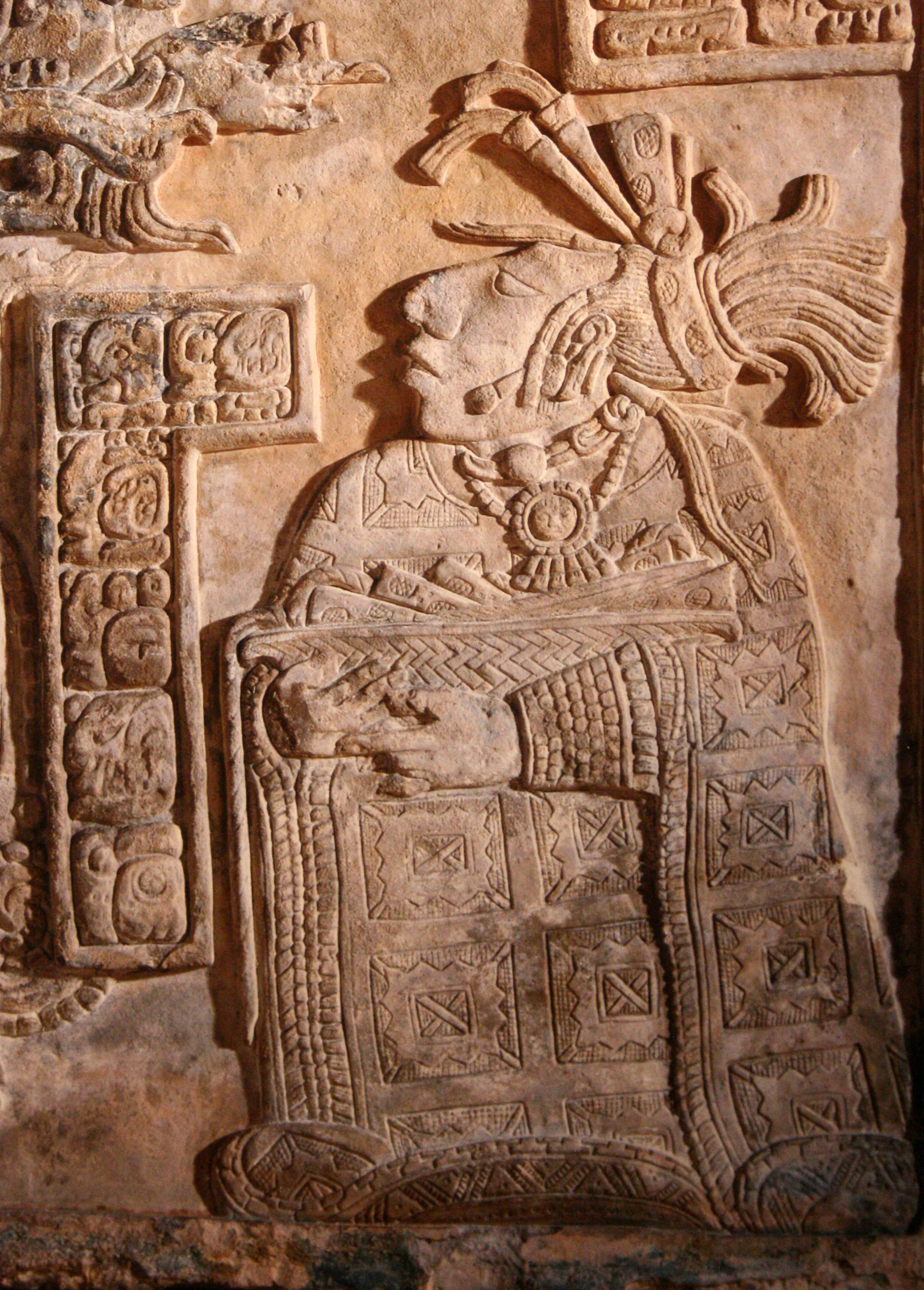
Lady Wak Tuun of Motul de San José married Yaxun B'alam IV of Yaxchilán. Here she is depicted performing a bloodletting rite in AD 755. Yaxchilán Lintel 15, now in the British Museum.

In the Late Classic period Motul de San José was located between two mutually hostile powers, the great city of Tikal to the north and the breakaway kingdom of Petexbatún to the southwest, which had become a vassal of Tikal's implacable enemy Calakmul. In Mesoamerica, such border states as Motul de San José became centres of political activity as they tried to manipulate the shifting political fortunes of their neighbours to their own advantage. This seems to be the case at Motul de San José with its rich ceramic tradition being a testament to the politically motivated banqueting that took place in the city. In the 8th century, although Motul de San José was the capital of the Ik polity, the aristocracy of its satellite sites wielded great power and were able to challenge their own position within the political hierarchy of the state while remaining subordinate to the ruling lord of the capital city.

During the 7th century AD, Motul de San José is recorded in hieroglyphic inscriptions as being a vassal of Calakmul. By the early 8th century the city had switched its allegiance to Jasaw Chan Kʼawiil I, king of Tikal, then falling under the power of Petexbatún, itself a vassal of Calakmul, in the middle of the 8th century, before once again switching its allegiance to Tikal. In 711, Jasaw Chan Kʼawiil I, Lord of Tikal, was recorded as overlord of Motul, perhaps reflecting Tikal's traditional overlordship of the city. In spite of these shifting alliances, Motul de San José acted with a degree of independence and was a powerful kingdom in the 8th century AD, with its ruler using the kaloomte title given to high kings. The city's rulers became very successful on the political scene in the wider Maya region, with the use of politically motivated feasting, war, economics and political marriages.

There is a glyphic record that sometime before 731 a lord of Motul was captured by a lord (Ruler B) of Machaquilá. In 740, Machaquila attacked Motul de San José. Hieroglyphic Stairway 3 at Dos Pilas records that in 745 a lord of Motul was captured by K'awiil Chan K'inich of Dos Pilas. In the middle of the 8th century AD, Motul de San José was closely allied with the important city of Yaxchilan on the Usumacinta River, as demonstrated by the fact that the king of Yaxchilan Yaxun B'alam IV ("Bird Jaguar IV") who ruled from 752 to 768, took two wives from Motul de San José. They are named in inscriptions at Yaxchilan as Lady Wak Tuun and Lady Wak Jalam Chan Ajaw. Lady Wak Jalam Chan Ajaw is shown preparing her husband for a battle that took place in 755 on Yaxchilan Lintel 41, now in the British Museum in London. In fact, the alliance with Yaxchilan may date further back to the early 8th century since Yaxchilan Lintel 25 (dedicated in AD 723) used the so-called X-ray style of imagery that is closely associated with the Motul de San José polity. However, relations with Yaxchilan were not always peaceful and Hieroglyphic Stairway 5 at Yaxchilan records that Itzamnaaj B'alam III of Yaxchilan defeated the lord of Motul some time in the latter part of the 8th century.

===== Known rulers =====
All dates A.D.

Name	Ruled
Sak Muwaan	sometime between 700–726
Tayel Nichan Kʼinich Nichʼich	c.725–740?
Yajaw Teʼ Kʼinich	29 September 740?–755?
Lamaw Ekʼ	755?–779
Sak Chʼeen	?–? Late Classic.
Kan Ekʼ	c.849

An Ik-style vessel possesses a hieroglyphic text declaring that it was the property of Chuy-ti Chan, the son of Sak Muwaan, divine lord of Motul de San Jose who ruled between AD 700 and 726. Chuy-ti Chan is described as an artist and ballplayer and appears to have been appointed as an ambassador to the site known as Maan.

Two rulers feature prominently on Ik-style ceramics, they are named as Yajawte' K'inich and Lamaw Ek'. Lamaw Ek' appears to have ruled directly after Yajawte' K'inich but was not his son, on one vessel his father is given the title k'uhul Ik'nal, a "divine noble of Motul de San José" but not the king (whose title is k'uhul ajaw or "divine lord"). Each of these two rulers had his own dedicated master painter. The artist of Yajawte' K'inich is named on the ceramics as T'uubal Ajaw, Lord of T'uubal. This latter site, T'uubal, is thought to be located in Petén somewhere between Tikal and Naranjo. Yajawte' K'inich is depicted on one Ik-style vessel wearing a mask and dancing, he is also depicted on Stelae 2 and 6 in the site core. Yajawte' K'inich is recorded on one vessel as possibly having died in AD 755.

The name of the painter who produced the ceramic vessels for Lamaw Ek' is only partially deciphered, as well as painting the vessel that possibly records the death of Yajawte' K'inich, he also painted a vessel recording the death of Lamaw Ek' as having taken place in AD 779.

==== Terminal Classic ====
Motul de San José underwent a major decline in population at the end of the Classic Period, between AD 830 and AD 1000, and construction also suffered. Terminal Classic ceramics are common but limited to the major centres of Motul de San José itself and its principal satellite La Trinidad de Nosotros. Although it declined, construction did not halt. Occupation at Group D in the site core continued while Late Classic structures at La Trinidad de Nosotros were modified in the Terminal Classic. There is little evidence for Terminal Classic occupation at the smaller satellite sites.

An inscription dating to AD 830 mentions the last known ruler of Machaquilá, which may be evidence of a long-standing relationship between the two sites. If this is the case, then Machaquilá appears to have been the dominant city out of the two. Seibal Stela 10, dating to roughly 849 AD, has an inscription naming Kan Ek' as ruler of Motul de San José, which is recorded as being one of the four paramount polities in the mid-9th century (ca. 849), along with Calakmul, Tikal and Seibal itself.

===== Itza migration =====
It has been suggested that Itza Maya from Motul de San José began the northward migration of Maya peoples to the Yucatán Peninsula at the end of the Classic Period. Classic period stelae at the site refer to the King of the Itzá, demonstrating that the Itza were already in the Petén region at this time. The nearby village of San José, on the shore of Lake Petén Itzá, is one of the last Itzá communities in Petén.

=== Postclassic Period ===
The full extent of occupation and activity in the Motul de San José area is not well understood for the Postclassic Period. It is known that there was a moderate occupation of the area during the Early Postclassic period, between AD 1000 and AD 1250. Early Postclassic construction and ceramics have been identified at Motul de San José and all of its satellite sites, but construction was small scale and distribution of pottery was limited. La Trinidad de Nosotros was apparently a small village at this time and has produced some of the best examples of Early Postclassic ceramics.

There is little evidence of occupation in the Motul de San José area during the Late Postclassic, from AD 1250 to AD 1697. It is possible that La Trinidad de Nosotros was Xililchi, a settlement visited by conquistador Martín de Ursúa after the fall of the Itza capital Noj Petén to the Spanish in 1697, but no Late Postclassic remains have yet been identified by archaeologists.

=== Modern history ===
It is likely that the satellite site of Akte was the ruin that Spanish friar Andrés de Avendaño referred to as Tanxulukmul in early 1695. Teoberto Maler visited Motul de San José in May 1895, and described one of the stelae in his report Explorations in the Department of Peten, Guatemala, published by the Peabody Museum of Archaeology and Ethnology of Harvard University in 1910. Ian Graham and Arlen Chase have separately mapped portions of the site core.

Before the establishment of the Motul Ecological Park, the site was used for agriculture, specifically the cultivation of maize. The site has been damaged several times by wildfires caused by uncontrolled stubble burning in 1986, 1987 and again in 1998. This last fire badly damaged the stelae in the site core.

In 1998, the mayor of San José oversaw the improvement of the road to Motul de San José, which involved surfacing the road with gravel and opened the archaeological site to easier access, resulting in increased tourism at the site.

The Proyecto Arqueológico Motul de San José (Motul de San José Archaeological Project) has been investigating Motul de San José and its satellites from 1998 to 2008, under the direction of Antonia Foias of Williams College and Kitty Emery of the Florida Museum of Natural History. The core of the satellite site of Akte was mapped in 2002 and Trinidad de Nosotros was investigated by the project in 2003.

== Site description ==
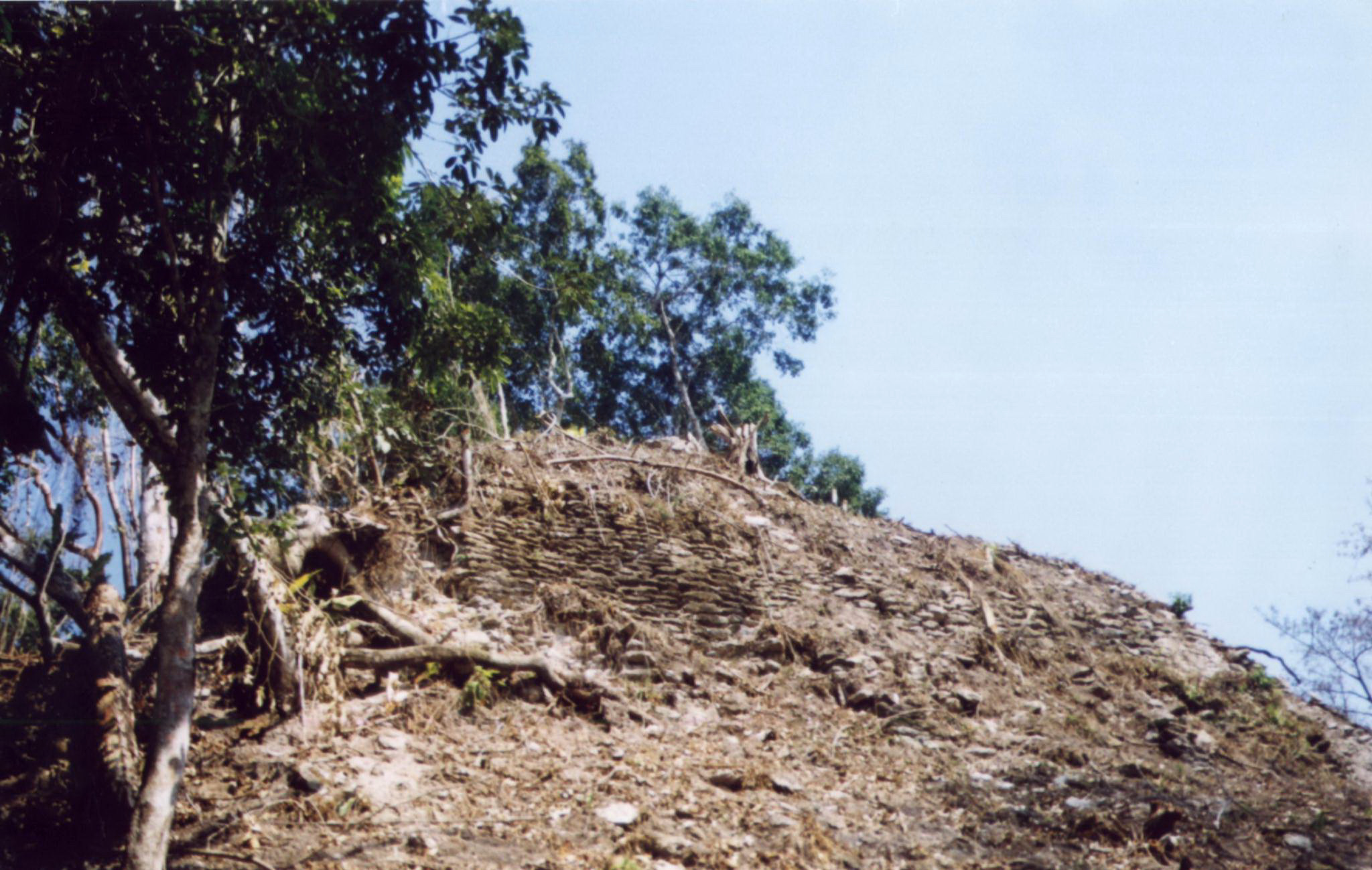
The summit of one of the larger pyramids of Group C, built with thin, flat stones, an architectural style that probably dates it to the Terminal Classic

Around 230 structures have been mapped in an area covering 2 square kilometres (0.77 sq mi), however, the total area occupied by the city was probably much greater than this. The total size of Motul de San José is estimated at 4.18 square kilometres (1.61 sq mi), with only about a third of this having been mapped. The ceremonial centre of the city covers an area of 0.4 square kilometres (0.15 sq mi), an area which encompasses more than 144 structures including a sizeable palace, 6 stelae, 33 plazas of widely differing sizes, and various temples and elite residential areas. Further residential areas of the city cover an additional 1.2 square kilometres (13,000,000 sq ft), which includes both elite and commoner residences, with outlying settlements located for several kilometers to the north and east, with one residential group associated with agricultural terraces being situated 2 km to the north of the site. In total, 33 plaza groups have been mapped at Motul de San José.

By 2003, around 1,800 fragments of figurines had been excavated from the site, its periphery and its satellites, with 239 of these being either heads or complete figurines.

The site can be generally divided into three broad areas, the site core, a North Zone and an East Zone. The North Zone is separated from the site core by a wide depression containing clay soil that may have served as a reservoir for the city. Several quarries have been identified on the northern and southern edges of this depression.

The major architecture can be divided into five groups, labelled A to E. Each of these groups has at least one pyramid and various palace type structures. The major residential complexes of the site are found in Groups A, B and D, not including the royal palace in Group C. The major architectural groups are divided by lower lying areas that may have been used for intensive agriculture. The urban area of the site extends for 1.2 kilometres (1,200 m) around the site core, with this area having been continuously occupied with a full range of structures from elite down to commoner in status.

Two distinct architectural styles date to the last period of the site's occupation in the Late Classic. One uses well-carved stone blocks for construction and is possibly earlier than the second style, which is believed to date to the Terminal Classic and uses thin, flat stones.

=== Architectural groups ===
==== Group A ====
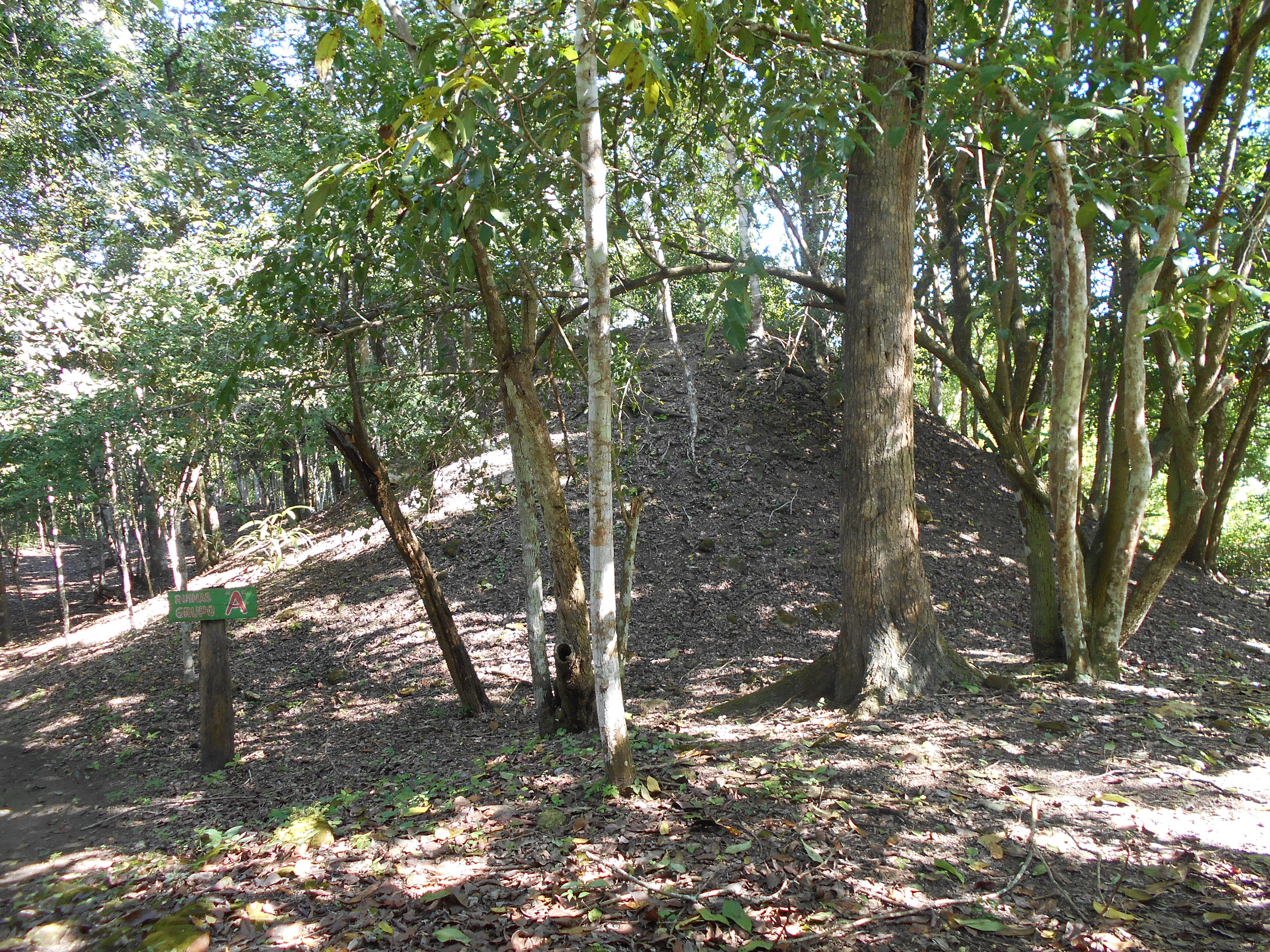
Looted pyramid in Group A

Group A is the largest group west of the site core. The group includes a 5.5-metre (18 ft) tall pyramid, severely damaged by looters' pits, with one in the summit and one each on the north, east, south and west sides. IDAEH has since refilled all five pits. Six large rectangular palace-type structures are situated to the west of this pyramid, measuring up to 5 metres (16 ft) high. A plaza is formed in Group A by the pyramid on the east side and a palace on the west side, accessed from the plaza via a stairway. Southeast of the palace is another plaza surrounded on three sides by palace-type structures.

==== Group B ====
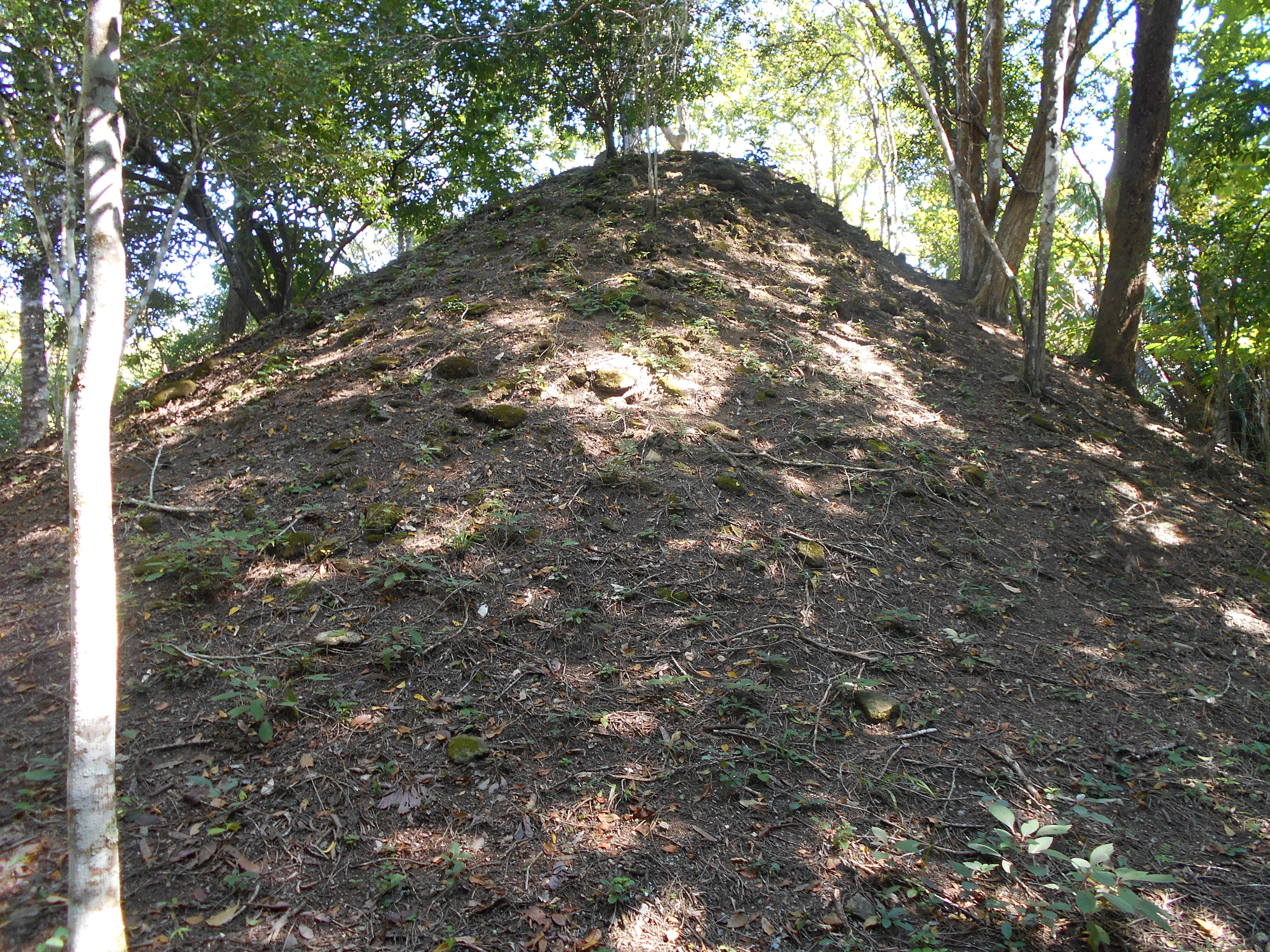
Pyramid in Group B

Group B includes a 7.7-metre (25 ft) high pyramid located about 90 metres (300 ft) south of a palace complex laid out around two small plazas. The main complex in Group B closely resembles a complex at Dos Pilas in the Petexbatún region. The pyramid has been looted, with the looters' pits having been refilled by IDAEH. The highest structure in the palace complex measures 4.5 metres (15 ft) high and is on the south side of the west plaza, its stairways stylistically resemble stairways from the Petexbatún. The palace complex has been looted, with one of the smaller structures around the east plaza having been completely destroyed.

A low wall runs north for 120 metres (390 ft) from the northeast corner of the east plaza, it measures between 0.3 and 0.5 metres (12 and 20 in) high and 0.5 metres (20 in) wide. The wall ends in a platform supporting several structures, it may have divided different parts of the site or marked the edge of an avenue.

To the north of Group B are several smaller groups of structures. They consist of residential complexes laid out around small plazas and their occupation was limited purely to the Late Classic period. Stela 2 is situated on a low platform to the west of the main pyramid.

==== Group C ====
Group C is the principal group at Motul de San José. It includes the Main Plaza, which is surrounded by pyramids and palaces. The tallest pyramid is 20 metres (66 ft) high. The three largest pyramids in Group C belong to the architectural style possibly dating to the Terminal Classic, being built of thin, flat stones. Excavations have revealed that Group C was occupied from around 300 BC, in the Late Preclassic.

The Main Plaza in Group C measures approximately 100 by 200 metres (330 by 660 ft) and is bordered by the Acropolis on the north and west sides, twin pyramids on the east side and the South Pyramid on the south side. It is the largest plaza at Motul de San José, encompassing an area greater than 11,000 square metres (120,000 sq ft). There are five stelae in the plaza commemorating Classic Period rulers, they have all been badly damaged by bushfires. On the west side of the plaza is a lower pyramid, measuring 7.8 metres (26 ft) high, that has been damaged by looters. A badly eroded stela was found close to this pyramid, another stela was erected in front of the South Pyramid. All three of the principal pyramids in Group C still support the remains of their summit shrines, possibly even with parts of their roofs and roof combs. The construction of these remaining structures consists of the thin, flat stones associated with the Terminal Classic occupation of the site.

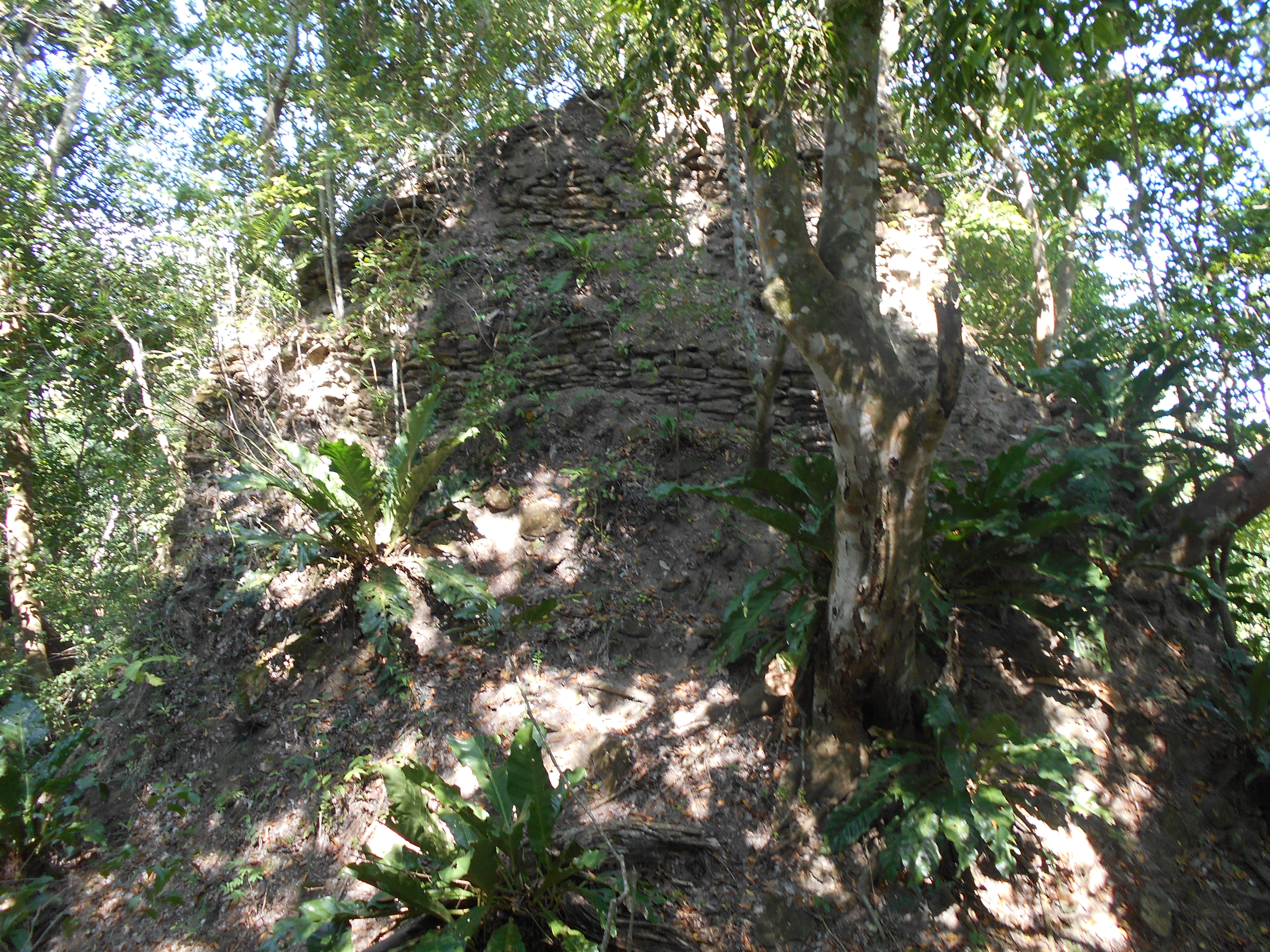
Summit of the north twin temple, viewed from the saddle between the two pyramids

The Twin Temples were both built on the same platform on the east side of the Main Plaza and have heights of 17 metres (56 ft) and 18 metres (59 ft), three stelae (Stelae 3, 4 and 5) were erected in front of them in a north–south line. The south pyramid of the two has been somewhat damaged by looters. Both of these pyramids probably originally supported roof combs and were accessed by twin stairways rising from the plaza to the west.

The Acropolis is a palace complex laid out around six small plazas, which it completely encloses, and forms the north side of the Main Plaza. It is a massive architectural complex covering an area of more than 83,000 square metres (890,000 sq ft) and is likely to have been the palace of the royal family. Two structures lying immediately to the south of the central plaza within the complex itself measure as high as 10.8 metres (35 ft) and 8.7 metres (29 ft) respectively. Investigations at the northern extreme of the Acropolis uncovered a piece of a plate dated to the Terminal Classic period. Excavations in the northwestern portion of the Acropolis have revealed a series of stucco floors and large amounts of ceramic remains, as well as fragments of worked stone, obsidian, bone and shell. Among the artefacts recovered were three polychrome vessels, two tripod vessels, a flute and a drum. Ceramic remains dated to the Late Classic have been found in all levels of the Acropolis. One of the ceramic vessels excavated from the acropolis was in a style associated with Tikal. Investigations behind the west structure of the northwest plaza in the Acropolis recovered fill that included ceramic fragments dating as far back as the Late Preclassic and Early Classic.

The South Pyramid is the highest structure at the site, measuring 20 metres (66 ft) tall. As its name suggests, it forms the south side of the Main Plaza. Excavations on the north (plaza) side of this temple uncovered Stela 6.

==== Group D ====
Group D is an elaborate residential complex located to the north of the twin pyramids in Group C and northeast of the Acropolis, like the other groups it consists of various structures laid out around a plaza. The group includes two palaces, including one on the west side of the plaza that has been badly damaged by looters. A 5-metre (16 ft) pyramid is situated on the east side of the Group D plaza. A looters' trench that was cut into the pyramid revealed earlier levels of construction consisting of well made stone blocks, archaeological investigation of the looters' tunnel revealed that the looters had probably plundered a high-ranking noble, or royal, tomb. Items recovered from the looted tomb included polychrome ceramic fragments, 10 pieces of jade beads, 77 pieces of shell beads, 20 jade mosaic fragments, 145 shell mosaic fragments, 98 pyrite mosaic fragments, a shell necklace and a stingray spine. The human bones in the tomb had been painted red. The presence of the royal tomb suggests either that the palaces in Group D were royal residences or those of the priesthood dedicated to the rituals of the dead king.

The occupation of Group D dates as far back as the Middle Preclassic period. Group D was occupied as late as the Terminal Classic, when a termination ritual was apparently performed, after which the northern building of the group was abandoned. The ritual included scattering a large amount of rubbish in front of the south entrance to the building and then possibly burning the building itself. The rubbish is presumed to have come from the area of Group D itself and included some items associated with weaving and the manufacture of paper.

The south structure in Group D had a patio with two circular columns, an architectural style that is characteristic of the Terminal Classic period.

==== Group E ====
Group E is the second largest group at Motul de San José, after Group C. It is situated to the west of Groups C and D. The group includes two pyramids, measuring 7 metres (23 ft) and 4 metres (13 ft) high, both have been looted and the taller pyramid being located north of the smaller pyramid. Residential groups lie to the south and east of the pyramids, they are made up of three to four rectangular structures laid out around small central plazas, the structures are all less than 3 metres (9.8 ft) high.

Two palaces investigated in Group E are architecturally quite different from the palaces in Groups C and D. A notable feature is that their doors possess projecting corners. The western structure has a vaulted room with a central bench and also a cross-shaped exterior bench, the walls of the structure still stand 1 metre (3.3 ft) high. The north structure's walls stand 0.5 metres (1.6 ft) high and its western room had been divided in two by the placement of vertical stone slabs. This north structure did not possess any interior benches. It may be that the different architectural styles of Group E and the other main groups at Motul de San José result from their association with different lineages, each with its own style.

Group E is distinguished by a 200-metre (660 ft) long avenue, known as the North South Avenue, with residential groups on the east side. On the west side the avenue is bordered by a 1-metre (3.3 ft) high wall. The northern end of the avenue terminates at a small temple while the south ends at Plaza B.

=== Stelae ===
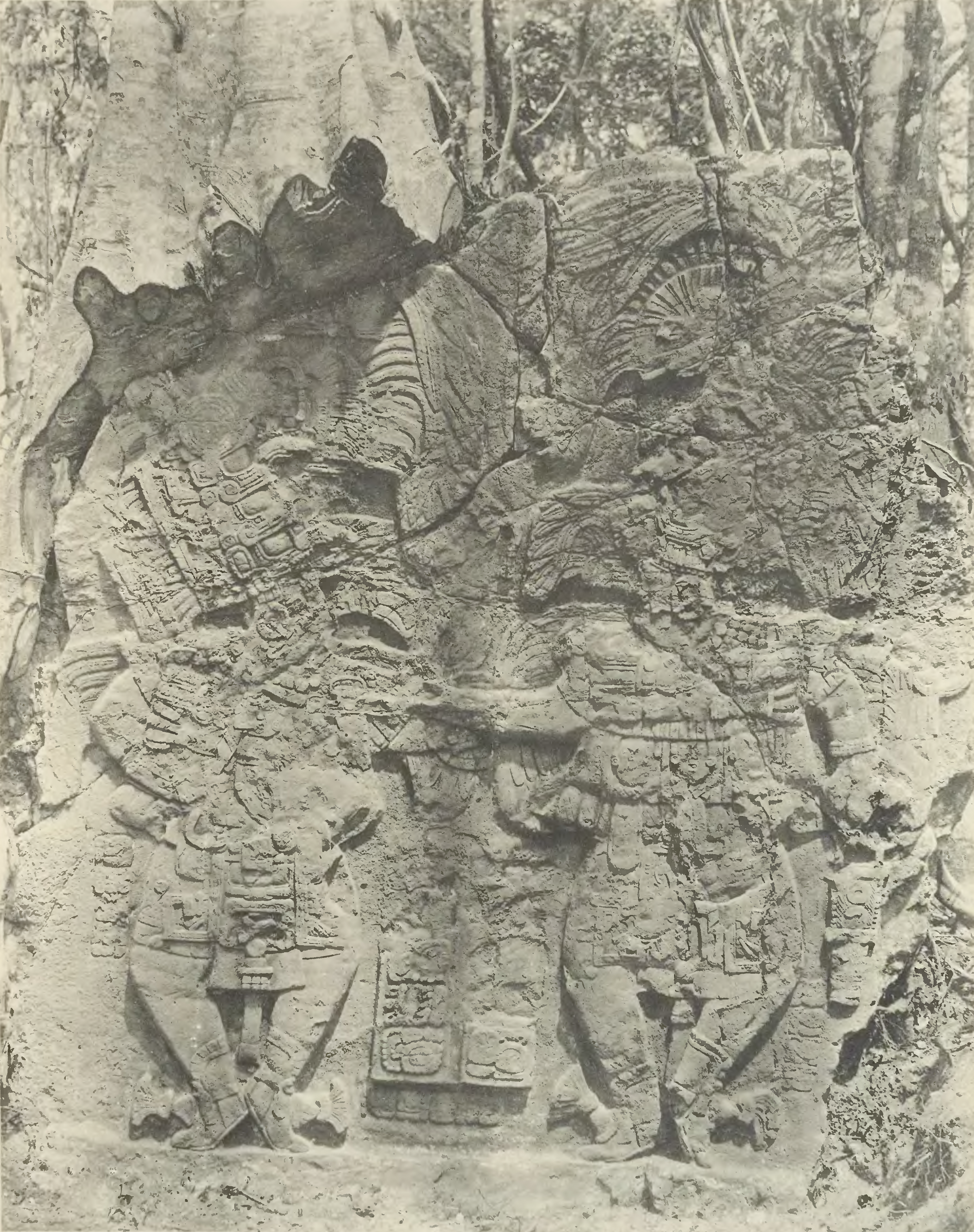
Maler's 1908 photo of the east side of Stela 2

Six stelae are known from Motul de San José, all were found in Group C, with five of them being located in the Main Plaza.

Stela 1, dating to the 8th century AD, contains the first known mention anywhere of the phrase Itza Chul Ahau ("Divine Lord of the Itza"). It is situated on the west side of the Main Plaza in Group C and has the most well preserved hieroglyphic text at the site. The text describes the accession to the throne of a local lord under the supervision of Jasaw Chan Kʼawiil I of Tikal. Stela 1 also provides the best evidence yet found identifying Motul de San José as the Late Classic Ik polity.

Stela 2 is situated some distance to the west of the Main Plaza in Group C, in Plaza B, in front of a small temple. This stela was photographed by Teoberto Maler in the first decade of the 20th century. The stela depicts king Yajawte' K'inich, it shows dancing figures on its east face. On its west face it depicts a figure sculpted using the so-called X-ray style found on Ik-style ceramics, which depicts the face in profile wearing a mask that has been cut away to show the face underneath.

Stela 3 is located on the east side of the Main Plaza in Group C, north of Stela 4.

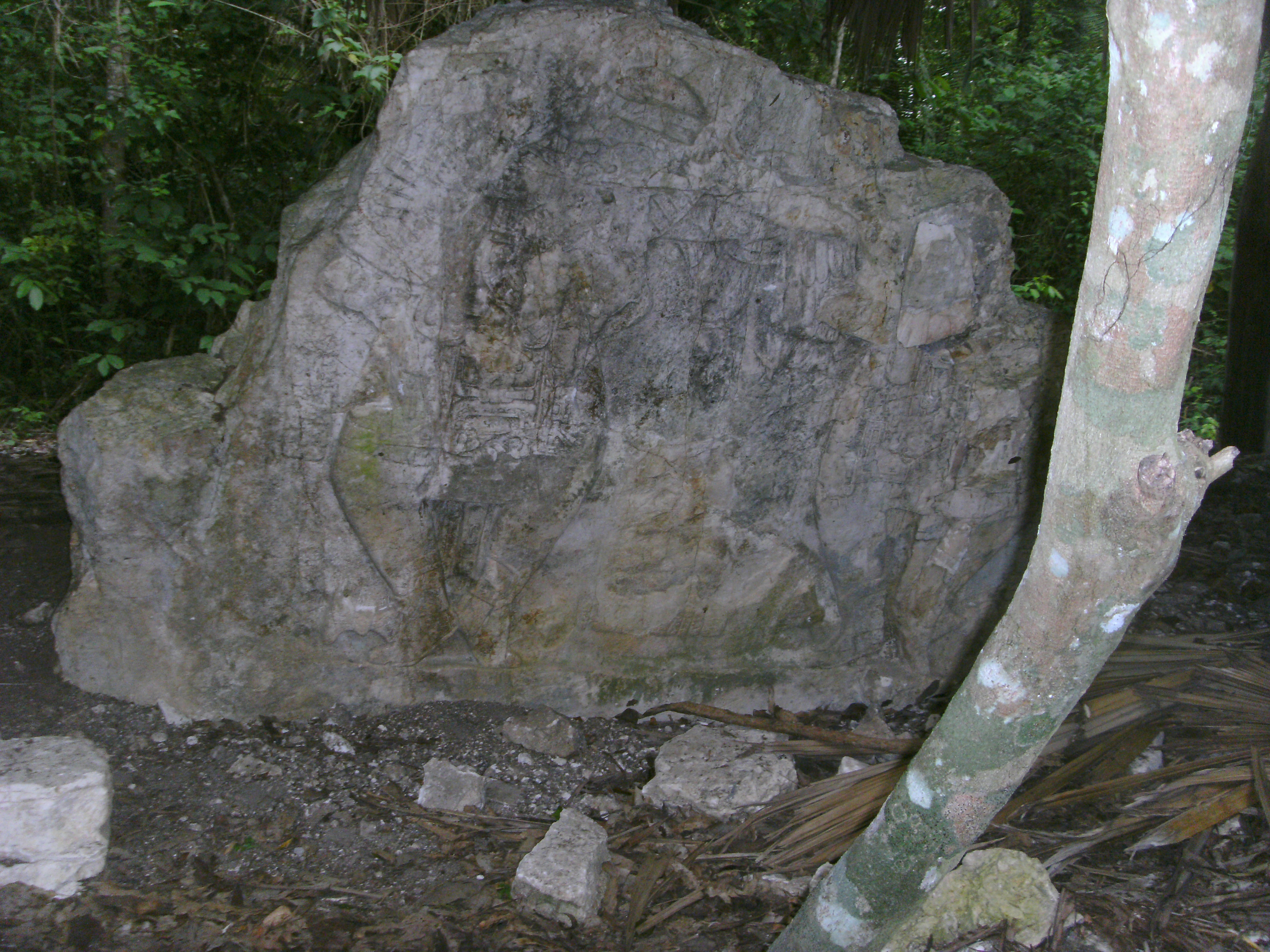
Stela 2 at Motul de San José as it appears now

Stela 4 is situated on the east side of the Main Plaza in Group C, near the Twin Temples, just south of Stela 3 and north of Stela 5. The stela shows king Yajawte' K'inich performing a dance, with one foot raised.

Stela 5 is also located on the east side of the Main Plaza, just south of Stela 4.

Stela 6 is located on the south side of the Main Plaza in Group C, just north of the South Pyramid. It was discovered in 1988 and had been broken into many pieces, although the base of the stela was still in situ. Two other large fragments were lying on the surface and more than 100 smaller fragments were collected. The stela appears to have shattered when it fell, some time after Motul de San José had been abandoned. The north and south faces of the stela bore sculpted designs, the remaining butt of the stela has the left foot of a human figure worked in profile on the south side. The sculpture on the north side has been pieced together in part and appears to have shown the figure of a ruler of the city dressed in rich clothing and regalia. The figure was positioned performing a dance, with one foot half lifted off the ground. In his right hand the ruler held a God K sceptre. The prelimanry reconstruction of the sculpture indicates that the figure of the king measured between 2.5 and 3 metres (8.2 and 9.8 ft) high. Stela 6 is very similar to Stela 1 from Dos Pilas with both depicting the ruler in an identical position. The stela appears to have been a relatively late addition to the plaza and dates to the Late Postclassic period.

== Satellite sites ==
There are a number of smaller satellite sites located around Motul de San José:

Name	Location	Coordinates
Akte	7 kilometres (4.3 mi) NW	17°4′53″N 89°56′13″W
Buena Vista	3 kilometres (1.9 mi) SW	17°0′1″N 89°54′52″W
Chachaklum	5 kilometres (3.1 mi) E	
Chak Maman Tok' (La Estrella)	3.6 kilometres (2.2 mi) SW	
Chakokot	2 kilometres (1.2 mi) E	17°1′38″N 89°52′55″W
Kantetul	2 kilometres (1.2 mi) N	
Ox Ool	S	
Tikalito	NNW	
La Trinidad de Nosotros	2.6 kilometres (1.6 mi) SE	17°0′34.61″N 89°52′56.55″W

=== Akte ===
Akte is situated 7.1 kilometres (4.4 mi) northwest of Motul de San José and is known for its sculptured monuments. The centre of Akte covers an area of 35 hectares (0.14 sq mi) and includes 32 structures on a 40-metre (130 ft) high artificially landscaped hill, with a number of other structures scattered through the surrounding area. The hill supporting the site core overlooks the rivers Akte and Kantetul. The main periods of occupation date to the Late Preclassic and Late Classic with further occupation in the Terminal Classic and Early Postclassic. The overall area of Akte is probably larger than that of Trinidad de Nosotros, covering a 2 to 3 square kilometres (0.77 to 1.16 sq mi) area, but this includes less structures than at Trinidad, with small residential groups widely scattered on hilltops around the site core.

The main residential complex at Akte rests upon a 3 to 5 metres (9.8 to 16.4 ft) platform and contains three patios, with other residential groups clustered around the east, south and west side of the platform's base. A small temple is located on the east side of the north patio. Akte may have served as a rural administrative centre or perhaps as a royal estate of the Motul de San José elite.

Seven sculpted monuments have been found at Akte, an unusual number for such a small site. If these monuments were originally erected at Akte, then this may mean that the site was actually outside of the Motul de San José polity. Archaeological investigations of the stelae carried out in 2003 were unable to determine if the monuments had been moved to Akte or not.

Stela 1 is the best preserved monument at Akte. It is badly eroded and can be dated by a damaged Long Count date inscribed on the back, which dates it to the end of the 7th century or the beginning of the 8th. The front of the stela bears the representation of a standing "divine lord" with attributes typical of the Late Classic.

Stela 2 is badly damaged, being broken into a number of fragments.

Stela 3 had a cache of 44 pieces of obsidian buried near its base.

=== Buena Vista ===
Buena Vista lies 3 kilometres (1.9 mi) to the southwest of the site core and 0.5 kilometres (0.31 mi) from the northwest shore of Lake Petén Itzá. 13 structures have been mapped, situated around a small plaza, with a small temple on the east side. The site is located on a hilltop and was once much larger but has been partially covered by the modern development of Nuevo San José. Structures 4 and 8 have been investigated, revealing that Buena Vista was probably occupied from the Middle Preclassic through to the Late Classic, with a much reduced population in the Early Postclassic. The site was surveyed in 2000 and preliminary excavations took place in 2001. The main pyramids of Motul de San José are visible from Buena Vista, as is a large part of the lake. Buena Vista has fairly good soil and the surviving portions of the site are currently used for milpa cultivation.

The earliest ceramic evidence excavated at Buena Vista dates to the very end of the Early Preclassic period, indicating that the site was initially settled at the transition between the Early and Middle Preclassic periods. The long occupational history of Buena Vista may be linked to its proximity to chert-rich hills. Excavations have revealed evidence of chert workshops dedicated to the production of tools, together with dumps of waste flakes.

Buena Vista features an early architectural style that differs from that at Motul de San José, consisting of platforms built from unworked stone, with wide front stairways and probably without superstructures. They were built in the Middle to Late Preclassic periods and then reused in the Late Classic. The differences in style between Buena Vista and Motul probably results from differing epochs of construction.

Group A is arranged around the main plaza. Group B is located a little to the southeast, and contains structures 11 to 14.

Structure 1 is the East Pyramid, it is located on the hillside a short distance from the rest of the mounds. It was a 2.5 metres (8.2 ft) high Late Classic funerary structure containing a looted tomb. From the summit of this temple both Lake Petén Itzá and the Twin Temples of Group C at Motul de San José are visible.

Structure 4 is the North Structure. It dates to the Late Classic but overlies construction dating to the Middle Preclassic. A stairway ascended the front of the building, under which were found the remains of Late Classic polychrome ceramics, perhaps belonging to a pre-construction ritual offering. The stucco floors on top of the mound supported asymmetric walls that perhaps date to the Postclassic Period, being associated with a mix of Late Classic and Postclassic pottery.

Structures 7, 8 and 9 were long, low rectangular platforms. They measure 15 metres (49 ft) long by 3.5 metres (11 ft) wide and 0.6 metres (2.0 ft) high. They had perishable roofs and date to the Late Classic, although Structures 7 and 8 may overlie Middle Preclassic remains.

=== Chachaklum ===
Chachaklum (also spelt Chächäklu'um) is situated 5 kilometres (3.1 mi) east of the site core and may also have formed a part of the Motul de San José polity. It is a large site covering over 2 square kilometres (0.77 sq mi), an area that includes over 141 structures. Chachaklum includes a small ceremonial centre where a possible E-Group has been identified. The site is located in an area of savanna with poor soils considered unsuitable for the growing of maize, somewhat at odds with the settlement density of the site. The contrast between the settlement density and poor soils has highlighted the need for further research into Maya agriculture in a savanna environment. Chachaklum was a relatively large site of secondary rank within the Motul de San José polity.

Chachaklum's principal phase of occupation appears to date to the Terminal Classic period, during the 10th and 11th centuries AD. However, the site possesses massive basal platforms and these, together with the presence of the E-Group, suggests a longer occupational period than was immediately evident from the first excavations of the site. Further investigations have revealed a long occupational history beginning in the Late Preclassic period and continuing right through to the Late Classic.

=== Chak Maman Tok' (La Estrella) ===
Chak Maman Tok' is a very small site located 3.6 kilometres (2.2 mi) southwest of Motul de San José and about 0.5 kilometres (0.31 mi) from Buena Vista. The site includes a small number of mounds spread along the hillside overlooking Lake Petén Itzá. The site was investigated by archaeologists in 2005 and 2006. Although the site is very small, it seems to have been an important centre for the production of high-quality chert tools, and one of the major manufacturers of chert tools in the Petén lowlands with considerable economic importance within the Motul de San José polity.

The site has been severely damaged by modern construction with the chert deposits being reused as construction material.

=== Chakokot ===
Chakokot is located 2 kilometres (1.2 mi) to the east of the Main Plaza. It occupies an area of 16 hectares (0.062 sq mi) and consists of 59 structures widely dispersed around a small plaza upon the flat summit of a 40-metre (130 ft) high hill. Principal occupation dates from the Late Preclassic and Late Classic periods. The soils at Chakokot are considered good for agriculture and maize was grown within the site itself. The area between Chakokot and Motul de San José is occupied by a bajo, or low-lying seasonal swamp.

The Plaza at Chakokot is small and covers an area of about 1,200 square metres (13,000 sq ft). On the north and east sides it is bordered by residential groups, a 3-metre (9.8 ft) square platform is to the south and on the west by two low parallel structures measuring just 0.50 metres (1.6 ft) high.

The largest structure at Chakokot is a 10-metre (33 ft) tall temple to the east of a large residential area bordering the Plaza on the east side.

Most of the residential areas at Chakokot possess one or more bottle-shaped underground storage chambers, known as chultunob, with 14 having been found as of 2001. Because of the thick vegetation at the site, investigators consider that there are probably more to be found. These chultunob were closed with disc-shaped stone lids, many of which were found either still in place or close to the aperture of the chultun to which it belonged. The stone lids were without perforations so it is supposed that the chambers were used to store dry goods rather than water.

=== Kantetul ===
Kantetul is located 2 kilometres (1.2 mi) north of the site core.

=== Ox Ool ===
Ox Ool is located in the hill country a few kilometers south of Motul de San José, and has fertile soil for agriculture.

=== Tikalito ===
Tikalito is located in the hills a few kilometers north-northwest of Motul de San José, and possesses rich soils for agriculture.

=== La Trinidad de Nosotros ===
La Trinidad is known as Sik'u' in the Itza language. It is located 2.6 kilometres (1.6 mi) southeast of Motul de San José on the northern shore of Lake Petén Itzá. The site is located at the closest point to Motul on the lake shore and it may have served as a Maya port. The site has more than 115 structures located in an area of 35 hectares (0.14 sq mi), and the site may actually cover 55 hectares (0.21 sq mi) and contain about 150 structures. The site had a long occupational history stretching right through from the Middle Preclassic to the Early Postclassic, with two phases of greater activity in the Early Classic around AD 350 and in the Late Classic from AD 650–830. The Terminal Classic occupation was largely limited to the lake shore but was fairly dense. The monumental architecture, port and the ballcourt all identify La Trinidad de Nosotros as an important secondary centre within the Motul de San José polity. Additionally, the site was situated close to a source of chert and probably manufactured chert tools.

La Trinidad de Nosotros has been tentatively identified as Xililchi, a settlement visited by conquistador Martín de Ursúa after Spanish Conquest of the Itza capital Noj Petén in 1697, but no Late Postclassic remains have yet been securely identified.

The site is divided into two areas. The site core is located on a hill 40 metres (130 ft) above the lake and with a good view across it. The second area is spread along the lake shore and the hillside leading to the site core. The site core has at least 80 structures arranged around five plazas. The majority of the structures are residential in nature but La Trinidad has an unusual amount of ceremonial architecture for such a small site. La Trinidad seems to have been an important port for the import and export of goods to and from Motul de San José.

Group C is the main residential complex of the site, it has a small shrine at the eastern end. La Trinidad de Nosotros has five main plazas within its site core, labelled I through to V. All of them were resurfaced multiple times between the Late Preclassic and Late Classic. The combined surface areas of the five plazas cover over 20,000 square metres (220,000 sq ft), with Plaza V making up about half of this, making it slightly smaller than the main plaza at Motul de San José itself.

Structure A-1 is the main temple, it is a 12-metre (39 ft) high radial pyramid.

Structure C-1 is an elite residence.

Structure E-1 may originally have been a circular building.

Structure G-1 is a sub-elite residence. The ballcourt is located in Group F. It is in the form of a T-shape, with 25-metre (82 ft) long sides, a closed northern end zone and a small temple adjoining the eastern side. The last phase of construction dates to the Late Classic. The ballcourt is similar in design to the ballcourt on the Main Plaza of Dos Pilas in the Petexbatún region. No ballcourt has been identified at the Motul de San José site itself, making the presence of one here of especial interest. Rich deposits were found associated with the ballcourt, including 21,000 potsherds, 239 pieces of obsidian, 155 fragments of ceramic figurines and 84 stone tools.

Group O is a small residential group to the west of Plaza V.

Various structures have been identified in the area of the port, including retaining walls, a possible breakwater and a quay. The port appears to have been partially enclosed by an artificial peninsula.

== See also ==
- Chichen Itza
