= Altar de Sacrificios =

Archaeological site in Petén, Guatemala

Coordinates: 16.467°N 90.533°W

Location of Altar de Sacrificios in Guatemala

Altar de Sacrificios is a ceremonial center and archaeological site of the pre-Columbian Maya civilization, situated near the confluence of the Pasión and Salinas Rivers (where they combine to form the Usumacinta River), in the present-day department of Petén, Guatemala. Along with Seibal and Dos Pilas, Altar de Sacrificios is one of the better-known and most intensively-excavated sites in the region, although the site itself does not seem to have been a major political force in the Late Classic period.

== Etymology ==
The site was named by Teobert Maler, who thought that Stela 1 was used for sacrifices. Though an emblem glyph for the site has been identified, its phonetic reading has so far eluded epigraphers.

== Location ==
Altar de Sacrificios is located on the Guatemalan side of the international border with Mexico, which follows the Salinas and Usumacinta rivers. It is 80 kilometres (50 mi) upriver from the important Classic period Maya city of Yaxchilán and 60 kilometres (37 mi) west of Seibal. The site is located on a small island located among seasonal swamps along the south bank of the Pasión River near where it joins the Salinas River (also known as the Chixoy River). This island measures approximately 700 metres (2,300 ft) from east to west, with the ceremonial architecture located on the higher eastern end and the residential groups on the lower western end.

== History ==
Archaeological investigations uncovered the long occupational history of the site and revealed that it was one of the earliest settlements in the Maya lowlands, having been founded before Tikal and other cities in the central Petén Basin, possibly by Mixe–Zoquean people who arrived from the west. This appears to have occurred around 800 BC, at the beginning of the Middle Preclassic period. Inhabitants lived at ground level in houses made of perishable materials, and had still not developed extensive trade networks.

The site begins to show clearer evidence of use as a ceremonial center between 600 and 300 B.C., when houses begin to be built on terraces.

Later in the Preclassic the site was settled by Maya peoples. The first pyramid (Structure B-1) in the Maya tradition dates from between 300 B.C. and 150 A.D. Also during this phase, traded jadeite and obsidian goods appear in burials. The site appears to have dominated the Usumacinta trade route circa 450 BC.

Altar de Sacrificios enters the Classic Period between 150 and 550 A.D. Marine objects such as stingray spines and shell objects as well as obsidian, greenstone and jadeite traded goods appear in burials. The large pyramid B-1 reaches its final form. Stelas with inscriptions are raised, altars are carved and, as in other sites in the region, objects from Teotihuacan are also found.

The latter half of the 6th century is marked by a hiatus in inscriptions and the focus of construction moving to Group A. In the early 7th century, the site seems to have recovered and carved stela reappear with features from the Late Classic. By the latter part of this century, the city has reached its peak period. New and old buildings are faced with limestone and a ballcourt is built. Higher occupational levels are mirrored by the large amount of monuments raised. Fine goods - pyrite mirrors, flint projectile points and jadeite beads - are found in burials. By the 9th century, when other sites are also entering the Terminal Classic, the quality of construction and goods begins to decline. By the 8th and 9th centuries AD, the population at Altar de Sacrificios was falling away.

During the last phase of occupation (ca. 900-950 CE), fine paste ceramics portraying people with a different appearance replace previous styles. The evidence suggests that during the Terminal Classic the site was occupied by foreigners and prospered at a time when nearby Seibal was also experiencing a resurgence in its fortunes, in both cases linked to the collapse of the Petexbatún kingdom based at Dos Pilas. It has been suggested that the arrival of outsiders as this time was due to Chontal Maya dominance of the Usumacinta riverine trade route at this time.

However, with the collapse of the major cities in the Usumacinta drainage, river trade declined drastically and was unable to be renewed by the newcomers. Altar de Sacrificios, together with the few other surviving polities in the western Petén, declined into stagnating inwardly-focused polities in spite of their longer distance contacts. By the Terminal Classic bone analysis has revealed that the health of the general population was suffering, with increased child mortality, decreased stature and the proliferation of disease, although the elite remained healthy. At the same time the reduced population withdrew into defensible locations at the site. There is little evidence of any occupation after ca. 950 AD.

=== Rulers ===
At least ten rulers are recorded on the monuments of Altar de Sacrificios, and there were probably more. Three rulers governed in the period from AD 455 to 524, there was then a sixty-year hiatus. In 589 a new and youthful ruler took office, he governed until AD 633. In the period from 633 to 662 there were four more rulers governing in relatively quick succession, these were probably followed by at least two more rulers although the later monuments are the least well preserved.

=== Modern history ===
The site was first discovered in 1895 by Teoberto Maler. Sylvanus Morley described the hieroglyphic inscriptions of Altar de Sacrificios in his 1938 work The Inscriptions of Peten. It was also visited by Frans Blom in 1928. The site was investigated by archaeologists A. Ledyard Smith and Gordon Willey of the Peabody Museum of Archaeology and Ethnology from 1958 to 1963. Since 2016, an international team led by Lycoming College has continued to map and excavate Altar de Sacrificios and its surrounding area.

== Site description ==
There are three main complexes of buildings, known as Groups A, B and C. Group A is organised around two plazas, known as the North Plaza and the South Plaza. It covers an area of approximately 400 by 400 metres (1,300 by 1,300 ft). The core is located on the higher eastern end of the small island supporting the site, with residential groups occupying the western end.

The site possesses 29 inscribed monuments, most of them so badly eroded as to be unreadable. Those dated monuments that are still legible span the period from AD 455 to AD 849.

Group A contains the palace complexes. Its two plazas are surrounded by 25 buildings. A total of 11 inscribed stelae were found in this group, 9 of them at or on the buildings around the North Plaza. Among those found on the plaza is Stela 2 with the latest inscribed date at the site (November 30, 849 A.D.).

- Structure A-I had 3 stelas on it, including Stela 1 after which the site was named.
- 3 stelae were placed on Structure A-II, along with one inscribed altar and three sculpted panels.
- Burial 96 is the burial of a woman who died in her twenties and was placed in a tomb in Structure A-III, some time later than Burial 128 in the same building. It was simpler than the latter and was accompanied by the offering of a polychrome ceramic vessel.
- Burial 128 is an elite tomb built into Structure A-III. It is stone lined with a wooden ceiling and contained the remains of a woman aged in her forties, placed on a straw mat. Offerings included ceramics and a number of artefacts made of jade, pyrite, bone and shell.
- Stela 8 is inscribed with a date equivalent to February 628 and is the earliest known monument to bear the Altar de Sacrificios Emblem Glyph. It was found in the South Plaza in association with Altar 2.
- The Ballcourt or Structure A-V separates the North from the South Plazas of Group A. It is of an open-ended type similar to ballcourts dated to the Late Classic at other cities in the western portion of the Maya lowlands. The playing area measures 8.65 by 28.8 metres (28.4 by 94.5 ft).

Group B is west of Group A, which it predates. It is the location of the main pyramid.

- Temple B-I is a step pyramid dating to the Early Classic period. It measures 36 m (118 ft) at is base and is 13 m (43 ft) tall. Its importance can be inferred from the 6 inscribed stelae found on it. Stela 10 with the earliest date at the site (August 28, 455 A.D.) was found here.

Group C is a small group also west of Group A but south of Group B. No inscribed monuments were found in it.
