= List of the rulers of Caracol =

Coordinates: 16.7631°N 89.1178°W

Ajaw of Caracol
- Emblem glyph of Caracol

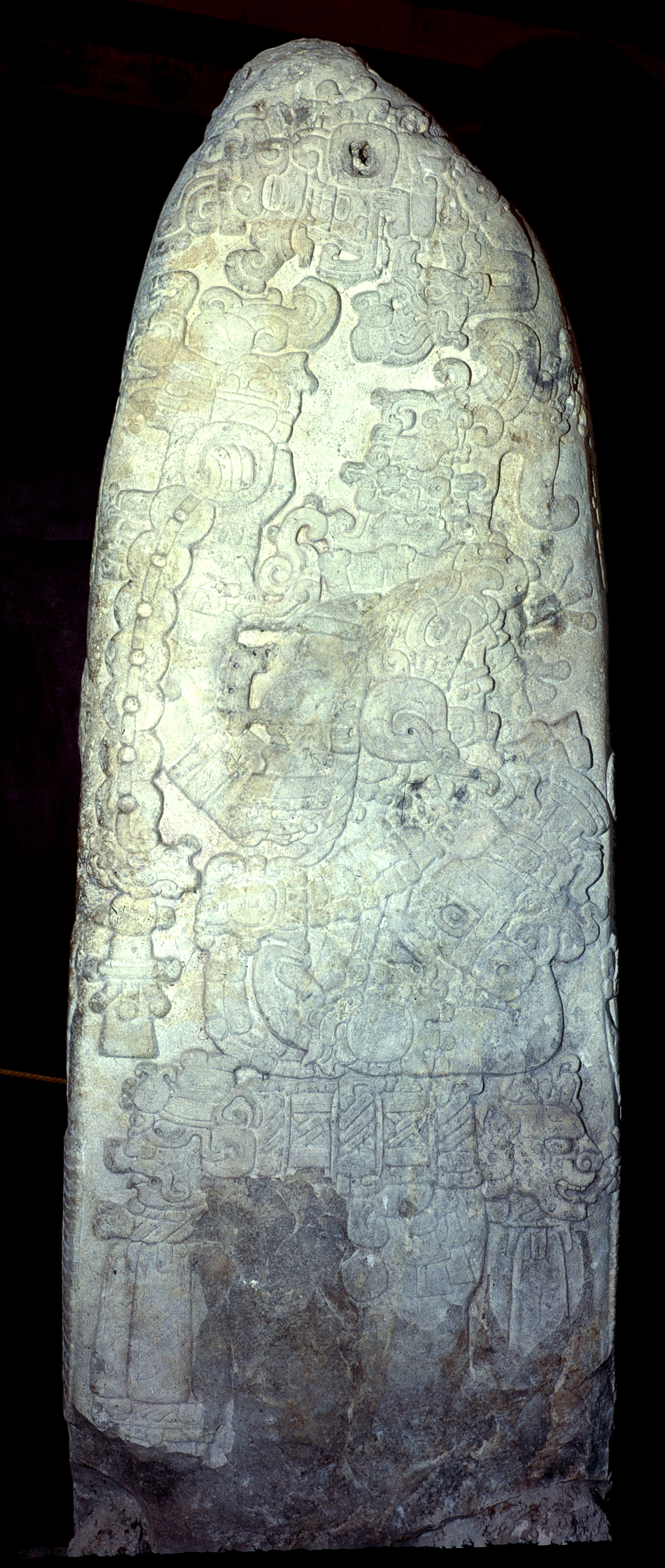
- Sihyaj Chan K'awiil II on the frontispiece of the Stela 31 of Tikal

Details
- Style: yajaw; ajaw; ux witz ajaw; k'uhul k'antumaak
- First monarch: Te' K'ab Chaak / first known
- Last monarch: Ruler XIII / last known
- Formed: AD 331 / presumed
- Abolished: ca 859 / presumed
- Residence: Caracol
- Appointer: Ajaw of Tikal / sometimes

This is a list of rulers of Caracol, a city-state of the Maya Lowlands during the Classic period. The exact number of rulers of Caracol is not known. As of 2008, fourteen of the city-state's lords have been identified, representing a dynastic succession spanning the 4th through 9th centuries AD. (Note: All dates in this article are in the Julian calendar, converted from the Maya Long Count via the GMT+2 correlation (Martin & Grube 2008, p. 13).)

== Background ==
Discoveries since the mid-1980s by archaeologists Arlen Chase, Diane Chase, and Jaime Awe about Caracol — "once thought to have been of only modest size and something of a political backwater" — are now considered to have "revolutionised our view" of the ancient city-state.

Caracol is now believed to have been 'a key player in the diplomatic and military manoeuvrings' of the Classic Maya Lowlands. As of 2008, fourteen lords of Caracol have been epigraphically identified, spanning the early fourth to early ninth centuries AD.

== List of known rulers ==
The following is an annotated, chronological list of known rulers of Caracol:

- Te' K'ab Chaak (reign: early 4th cent; monuments: 1) may have been the city-state's dynastic progenitor. His tomb was discovered in 2025. He is also attested in two post-6th century texts. The late reference to this figure implies he was held in high regard by later lords.
- K'ahk' Ujol K'inich I (reign: late 5th cent; monuments: 0) is poorly understood, being attested only in one 6th-century text, and another later one.
- Yajaw Te' K'inich I (reign: late 5th cent; monuments: 2) is better understood than his known predecessors. His Stela 13, dedicated in 514 to mark the end of the fourth k'atun, is particularly noted.
- K'an I (reign: early 6th cent; monuments: 2) is thought to have succeeded his father, Te' K'inich I. His accession was overseen by a higher authority, but 'it is unclear if this was a divine being or one of the region's dominant "overkings."'
- Yajaw Te' K'inich II (reign: late 6th cent; monuments: 5–6) oversaw Caracol's transition 'from the orbit of one great power, Tikal, to that of its rival, the Snake kingdom,' and thereby inaugurated a century-long golden age. His accession is known to have been overseen by Tikal's Wak Chan K'awiil.
- Knot Ajaw (reign: late 6th cent; monuments: 3–5) is among Caracol's lesser-known lords. His Stela 5 and 6 are particularly noted.
- K'an II (reign: early 7th cent; monuments: 9) oversaw a surge of metropolitan development at Caracol, and a successful war of conquest against Naranjo. His Altar 21, 'an especially elaborate "Giant Ajaw" stone,' is particularly noted, as is the 'key role' his mother, Lady Batz' Ek', played in his reign.
- K'ahk' Ujol K'inich II (reign: late 7th cent; monuments: 3) is known to have succeeded K'an II. He oversaw the defeat of Caracol at the Naranjo-launched star war of 680 and thereby inaugurated a century-long Dark Age in that city.
- Ruler VII (reign: late 7th cent; monuments: 1) is scarcely known, his reign falling during the post-680 hiatus in monumental construction. His one known monument, Stela 21 of 702, 'shows a king accompanied by a dwarf and a bound captive,' but the patron's name 'is entirely missing.' A tantalising 692 inscription in the nearby Naj Tunich cave, naming a Caracol aristocrat called Tz'ayaj K'ahk', provides a possible but uncertain candidate for this figure.
- Tum Yohl K'inich (reign: late 8th cent; monuments: 0) is likewise poorly understood. Crucially, doubt remains as to his royal status, and even as to whether all records of the Tum Yohl K'inich name refer to a single figure. He is thought to have been involved in a fire bearing ritual under the supervision of an Ixkun ruler.
- K'inich Joy K'awiil (reign: late 8th cent; monuments: 5–6) oversaw the end of Caracol's post-680 hiatus, and a push to reassert the city-state's regional influence. He is credited with the defeat of the Ucanal and Bital kingdoms. His Stela 11 and Altar 23 are particularly noted.
- K'inich Toobil Yopaat (reign: early 9th cent; monuments: 5–8) carried on the renaissance commenced by his predecessor. He is thought to have forged close relations with Ucanal, with joint ceremonies of state undertaken at both cities and wars waged in alliance. His monumental record is noted for the prominence afforded to Papamalil, lord of Ucanal.
- K'an III (reign: early 9th cent; monuments: 3) oversaw the beginning of the Classic Maya collapse in Caracol. His monuments, even more so than those of his predecessor, display 'a strong sense that autocratic kingship is [now] having to adapt to new circumstances, that kings now need to negotiate their position with relatives or magnates whose power matches or even exceeds their own.'
- Ruler XIII (reign: late 9th cent; monuments: 1) is the last known king of Caracol. His single monument, Stela 10, is the latest such in the 'crumbling' city, as 'no further signs of elite activity at Caracol' are known.

== Period of rule ==
The following table chronicles the estimated periods during which each of the known Lords ruled in Caracol:

Name	aka	From	To	Note
Te' K'ab Chaak	–	331	c. 349	Founder, presumed
K'ahk' Ujol K'inich I	Ruler I; Smoking Skull I	c. 470	c. 470	–
Yajaw Te' K'inich I	–	484	c. 514	Son of K'ahk' Ujol K'inich I, presumed; Acceded 12 Apr 484
K'an I	Ruler II; Lord Jaguar; Antenna Top I	531	c. 534	Son of Yajaw Te' K'inich I, presumed; Acceded 13 Apr 531
Yajaw Te' K'inich II	Ruler III; Lord Water; Lord Muluc	553	c. 593	Son of K'an I; Acceded 16 Apr 553
?	Knot Ajaw; Ruler IV; Ahau Serpent; Flaming Ahau	599	c. 613	Son of Yajaw Te' K'inich II; Born 28 Nov 575; Acceded 24 Jun 599
K'an II	Ruler V; Lord Stormwater Moon; Antenna Top II	618	658	Son of Yajaw Te' K'inich II; Born 18 Apr 588; Acceded 6 Mar 618; Died 21 Jul 658
K'ahk' Ujol K'inich II	Ruler VI; Smoking Skull II	658	c. 680	Acceded 22 Jun 658
?	Ruler VII	c. 695	c. 710	–
Tum Yohl K'inich	Ruler VIII	c. 793	c. 793	–
K'inich Joy K'awiil	Ruler IX; Mahk'ina God K; K'inich Hok' K'awiil	799	c. 803	Acceded 8 Dec 799
K'inich Toobil Yopaat	Ruler X; Ruler XI; Lord Quincuna	c. 810	c. 830	Acceded 6 Mar 804, presumed
K'an III	Ruler XII; Lord Stormwater Maize	c. 835	c. 849	–
?	Ruler XIII	c. 859	c. 859	–

== See also ==
- Maya monarchs, listing known rulers of various Classic and Postclassic Maya states
- Lists of ancient kings, listing lists of known rulers of various ancient Old and New World states

== Notes and references ==
=== References ===
1. FAMSI (2012) [First published ca 2004 by FAMSI]. "Maya Royal Dynasties" (PDF). FAMSI (Guide) (Revised by Inga E Calvin ed.). Los Angeles, California: Los Angeles County Museum of Art. Archived (PDF) from the original on 18 June 2023.
2. Martin S, Grube N (2008) [First published 2000 by Thames & Hudson]. Chronicle of the Maya Kings and Queens: Deciphering the Dynasties of the Ancient Maya (2nd ed.). London: Thames & Hudson. ISBN 978-0-500-28726-2. LCCN 2008396649.
3. Okoshi T, Chase AF, Nondédéo P, Arnauld MC, eds. (2021). Maya Kingship: Rupture and Transformation from Classic to Postclassic Times. Maya Studies. Gainesville, Florida: University Press of Florida. ISBN 978-0-813-05769-9. LCCN 2020037886.
4. Sharer RJ, Traxler LP (2006) [First published 1946 by SUP]. The Ancient Maya (6th ed.). Stanford, California: Stanford University Press. ISBN 0-8047-4816-0. LCCN 2005003043.
