= Kʼahkʼ Ujol Kʼinich II =

- Ajaw

King of Caracol
- Reign: 22 June 658 - 680
- Predecessor: K'an II
- Successor: Ruler VII of Caracol
- Born: Caracol
- Died: 680; Caracol
- Father: K'an II (possibly)
- Religion: Maya religion

Kʼahkʼ Ujol Kʼinich II ("Fire-headed Sun God") was a king of Caracol, Mayan city-state in Belize. He is also known as Ruler VI and Smoking Skull II. He reigned AD 658–680.

== Life ==
This ruler's predecessor, Kʼan II, was seventy years old and probably in bad health when he died. In contrast to the normal Maya practice, Kʼahkʼ Ujol Kʼinich acceded while Kʼan was still alive, their reigns overlapping by twenty-nine days. There may have been precedent for this at Caracol in the case of Yajaw Teʼ Kʼinich II and Knot Ajaw. It is not known if Kʼahkʼ Ujol Kʼinich II was a son of Kʼan.

The stucco text from Structure B-16-sub of the Caana platform records a "star war" attack on Oxwitzaʼ, the Caracol capital, by the 37th Ruler of Naranjo. The text goes on to say that sixty days later Kʼahkʼ Ujol Kʼinich "arrived" at Oxwitzaʼ, presumably from some place of shelter to which he had fled. Because his only known stela comes from the outlying site of La Rejolla, this hilltop redoubt is a candidate for the place of refuge.

The full stucco text has not been recovered as yet, but it is likely that it followed normal inscriptional rhetoric and went on to record some subsequent triumph by Caracol.
