= William Saturno =

American archaeologist and Mayanist scholar

William Andrew "Bill" Saturno (born Albany, New York) is an American archaeologist and Mayanist scholar who has made significant contributions toward the study of the pre-Columbian Maya civilization. Saturno is a former director of the Proyecto San Bartolo-Xultun at the Instito de Antropologia e Historia in Guatemala, a former national space research scientist at the Marshall Space Flight Center, and a research associate at the Peabody Museum at Harvard University. Saturno has previously worked as an Assistant Professor of Archaeology at Boston University and MIT and as a lecturer at the University of New Hampshire.

Saturno is best known for his discovery in 2001 of one of the oldest extant murals in the Maya region, at the site of San Bartolo in northeastern Guatemala. He said this discovery was his favorite and most challenging experience of his career, and that "being the first person to see [the murals] after more than 2,000 years, uncovering them bit by bit, with each part more beautiful than the last, is an experience unlikely to be matched." In 2010, Saturno and Franco D. Rossi discovered what they believe to be a workroom of a Xultún record keeper. The Mayan hieroglyphics at the site included representations of dates roughly 7,000 years in the future, casting doubt on the speculation that the conclusion of the Mesoamerican Long Count calendar would result in a 2012 doomsday scenario.

His current research interests are New World and Mesoamerican civilizations, landscape archaeology, remote sensing, geographic information systems (GIS) applied to archaeology, Mesoamerican iconography and religion, the evolution of complex societies, and archaeology in pop culture.

Saturno (as of 2022) works as an independent scholar, continuing to publish research with members of the San Bartolo-Xultun Regional Archaeological Project (PRASBX). He also provides insight to participants on National Geographic tours around the world.

== History and personal life ==
Saturno wanted to be an archaeologist from his early childhood, and first became interested in the ancient Maya civilization when he visited the Maya site of Palenque while working in Mexico. Having worked in archaeology for over 20 years, in an interview with National Geographic he stated: "I see being an archaeologist as both a great privilege and a great responsibility. I have been entrusted with the recovery, interpretation, and preservation of the material remains of the past, with the history of an ancient people, and the heritage of a modern one." For the last seven years, when he is not teaching or conducting field work, Saturno has led scholarly tours in Guatemala and Maya Mexico for Archaeological Tours.

Saturno currently lives with his wife and their three sons James, David, and Giancarlo, in Clinton, Connecticut, and enjoys soccer, opera, and snowboarding in his free time.

== Education and academia ==
He graduated summa cum laude from the University of Arizona with a B.A. in Anthropology and Latin American Studies after attending Binghamton University for a time. He then acquired his Master of Arts Degree from Harvard University in 1995 and his Ph.D. in anthropology from Harvard in 2000.

During his time at Harvard, he worked as a teaching fellow, undergraduate tutor, and teaching assistant in the Anthropology Department. Following the completion of their Ph.D. program, Saturno went on to become a lecturer in 2000 and an assistant professor in 2003. At this time, he also became a research scientist at National Aeronautics and Space Administration (NASA) in the Marshall Space Flight Center.

== Awards ==
Saturno has been awarded more than US$2.3m from over 45 grants throughout his career as an archaeologist, including the Peabody Museum Research Grant, National Endowment for the Humanities Collaborative Research Grant, and the Ambassador's Fund for Cultural Preservation for his work in San Bartolo and the NASA IPA for work in archaeological remote sensing.

== Fieldwork and projects ==
His most famous discovery to date, Saturno has worked continuously in San Bartolo since 2001 in an ongoing project. Work originally centered on the preclassic murals of San Bartolo, but more recently is focused on the large, nearby city of Xultun and the changes in Maya politics and kingship from the preclassic to European contact.

Since 2013, he has directed field work in Northern Peru, using remote sensing techniques like Landsat and ASTER to find archaeological features in the area and commercial sugar cane plantation environments. He is interested in how ancient Peruvians adapted to their coastal desert environment and how ancient land use has had lasting effects on environmental functions.

He has also conducted extensive excavation, surveying, and mapping of ancient Maya and Peruvian archaeological sites, including the ancient Maya city of Copan and Rio Bravo in Belize.

== Publications and media appearances ==
Saturno has written three books to date and contributed to over eight compiled archaeological volumes. In 2000, he published his Ph.D. dissertation as In the Shadow of the Acropolis: Rio Amarillo and its Role in the Copan Polity. He published The Murals of San Bartolo, El Peten, Guatemala, Part 1: The North Wall (2005) and its companion The Murals of San Bartolo, El Peten, Guatemala, Part 2: The West Wall (2010) with noted Mayan scholar Karl Taube. He has also written several academic articles on the subjects of San Bartolo, ancient Mayan religion and iconography, Mayan political organization and collapse, among many other Mesoamerican subjects, most recently in the journals Ancient Mesoamerica, American Anthropologist, Antiquity, and Science.

Saturno's most recent publication is "An early Maya calendar record from San Bartolo, Guatemala" (2022).

Saturno works extensively with National Geographic, from which he has received many grants, and has appeared in many of their broadcasts on the ancient Maya, and the ancient Mayan 'prophecy' about the 2012 'Apocalypse' (he very vocally disagreed with the interpretation of the Maya calendar predicting the end of the world) as well as several National Geographic LIVE events. In 2013, he appeared in the National Geographic LIVE event, New Light on the Ancient Maya and will be appearing in another of their events, In Search of the Ancient Maya, where he will give an overview of the archaeological history of the Classical Maya. He also was featured in the History Channel's Indiana Jones and the Ultimate Quest.
