= Yajaw Teʼ Kʼinich I =

Mayan king of Caracol in Belize

- Ajaw

King of Caracol
- Reign: 12 April 484 – 514
- Predecessor: Kʼahkʼ Ujol Kʼinich I
- Successor: Kʼan I
- Born: Caracol
- Died: 514; Caracol
- Issue: Kʼan I
- Father: Kʼahkʼ Ujol Kʼinich I
- Mother: Lady Penis-head of Xultun
- Religion: Maya religion

Yajaw Teʼ Kʼinich I was a Mayan king (ajaw) of Caracol in Belize.

== Life ==
He was probably a son of Kʼahkʼ Ujol Kʼinich I and Lady of Xultun (she was maybe a wife of latter king).

Whereas his predecessors are known only from retrospective texts, this ruler's monuments record a contemporaneous date in AD 487.

His monuments are stelae 13 and 20? and altar 4.

His son was Kʼan I and his grandson was Yajaw Teʼ Kʼinich II.

== Sources ==
- Chronicle of the Maya Kings and Queens by Simon Martin and Nikolai Grube
