= Kʼan II =

- Ajaw
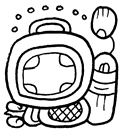
- Caracol glyph

King of Caracol
- Reign: 9 March 618 - 21 July 658
- Predecessor: Knot Ajaw
- Successor: K'ahk' Ujol K'inich II
- Born: 18 April 588; Caracol
- Died: 21 July 658 (aged 70); Caracol
- Issue: K'ahk' Ujol K'inich II (possibly)
- Father: Yajaw Teʼ Kʼinich II
- Mother: Lady Batzʼ Ekʼ of Yaxha
- Religion: Maya religion

Kʼan II (born on April 18, 588, died on July 21, 658; Ruler V, Lord Stormwater Moon and Antenna Top II) was a Maya ruler of Caracol (in present-day Belize). He reigned AD 618–658.

== Biography ==
=== Birth and family ===
Kʼan was a younger son of the king Yajaw Teʼ Kʼinich II, and his mother was Lady Batzʼ Ekʼ (possibly Ix Tiwool Chan Ekʼ Lem) of Yaxha. His half-brother was Knot Ajaw. His paternal grandfather was Kʼan I.

=== Reign ===
In the view of the substantial expansion from the site core into the surrounding area during his reign, Kʼan II might be considered Caracol's most successful ruler. The wealth underlying this expansion was widespread, as indicated by the quality of grave goods and architecture in the outlying districts; Caracol's system of roadways also expanded to accommodate the growing population.

Having taken his grandfather's name upon his accession to rulership, Kʼan often combined it with his childhood name (Sak Bʼaah Witzil [or Sak Witzil Bʼaah]) in order to distinguish his inscriptions from those of his ancestor. He was a successor of his half-brother.

The fact that his mother, Lady Batzʼ Ekʼ, was the more junior wife caused Kʼan II to emphasize his royal legitimacy and his mother's importance in the text of Stela 3.

It is to Kʼan that we owe Altar 21's account of his father's reign, which saw a shift from the overlordship of Tikal to that of the Kaan ("Snake") kingdom, as well as the great Tikal reversal of AD 562. He records all of his father's major period endings, but he omits that of his half-brother.

Mentions of the Snake kingdom in Kʼan II's inscriptions include a reference to Sky Witness (possibly his death) in 572; an event performed under the auspices of Yuknoom Chan in 619; the accession of Tajoom Ukʼab Kʼahkʼ in 622; the receipt of a gift from Tajoom Ukʼabʼ Kʼahkʼ in 627; the latter's death in 630; and two successful war events involving Yuknoom Head in 631 and 636. It was probably toward the end of this timespan that the Snake kingdom became established in Calakmul.

One of Kʼan II's most important monuments is the Naranjo Hieroglyphic Stairway.

=== Death ===
He died on July 21, 658.
