= Mónica Pellecer Alecio =

Guatemalan archaeologist

Monica Pellecer Alecio is a Guatemalan archaeologist who in 2005 led a team that found the oldest known Maya royal tomb to date, belonging to an early Maya king (150BC). It was uncovered beneath a small pyramid at San Bartolo.
