= Karl Taube =

American ethnohistorian (born 1957)

Karl Andreas Taube
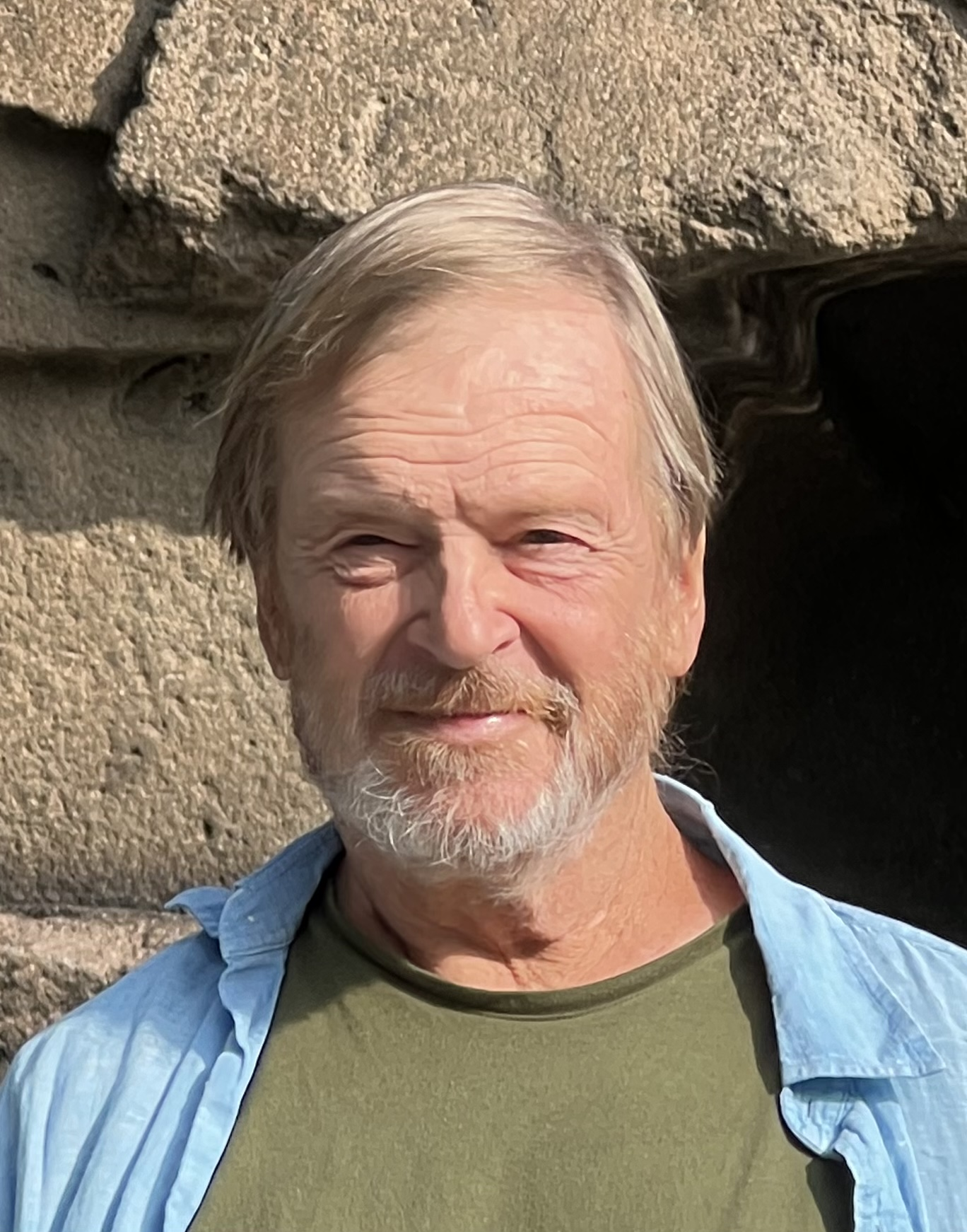
- Karl Taube, American anthropologist and archeologist, 2022.
- Born: September 14, 1957 (age 68)
- Parent: Henry Taube

Karl Andreas Taube (born September 14, 1957) is an American Mesoamericanist, Mayanist, iconographer and ethnohistorian, known for his publications and research into the pre-Columbian cultures of Mesoamerica and the American Southwest. He is Distinguished Professor of Anthropology at the College of Humanities, Arts, and Social Sciences, University of California, Riverside. In 2008 he was named the College of Humanities, Arts, and Social Sciences distinguished lecturer.

== Family background ==
Karl Taube's father, Canadian-born Henry Taube (d. 2005), whose parents were ethnic Germans, was the recipient of the 1983 Nobel Prize in Chemistry.

== Education ==
Taube commenced his undergraduate education at Stanford, relocating to Berkeley where he completed a B.A. in anthropology in 1980. He enrolled in graduate studies in anthropology at Yale, where he completed his master's degree in 1983 and doctorate in 1988. At Yale, Taube studied under several notable Mayanist researchers, including Michael D. Coe, Floyd Lounsbury and the art historian Mary Miller. Taube later co-authored with Miller a well-received encyclopedic work, The Gods and Symbols of Ancient Mexico and the Maya. His doctoral dissertation is The Ancient Yucatec New Year Festival: The Liminal Period in Maya Ritual and Cosmology. (Volumes I and II).

== Career ==
Field research undertaken during the course of his career include a number of assignments on archaeological, linguistic and ethnological projects conducted in the Chiapas highlands, Yucatán Peninsula, central Mexico, Honduras and most recently, Guatemala. As of 2003, Taube has served as Project Iconographer for the Proyecto San Bartolo, co-directed by William Saturno and Monica Urquizu. His primary role was to interpret the murals of Pinturas Structure Sub-1, dating to the first century B.C. In 2004, Taube co-directed an archaeological project documenting previously unknown sources of "Olmec Blue" jadeite in eastern Guatemala. Taube has also investigated pre-Columbian sites in Ecuador and Peru.

== Themes ==
Taube's two most important books are "The Major Gods of Ancient Yucatan" (1992) and "Olmec Art at Dumbarton Oaks" (2004). The former one restudied the Maya deities of the three codices and aligned them with the deities of the Classic Period. The two-part study of the San Bartolo murals (2005, 2010), although listing several authors, could be considered his third main publication, insofar as it concerns the Late-Preclassic iconography of the maize god and the hero Hunahpu.

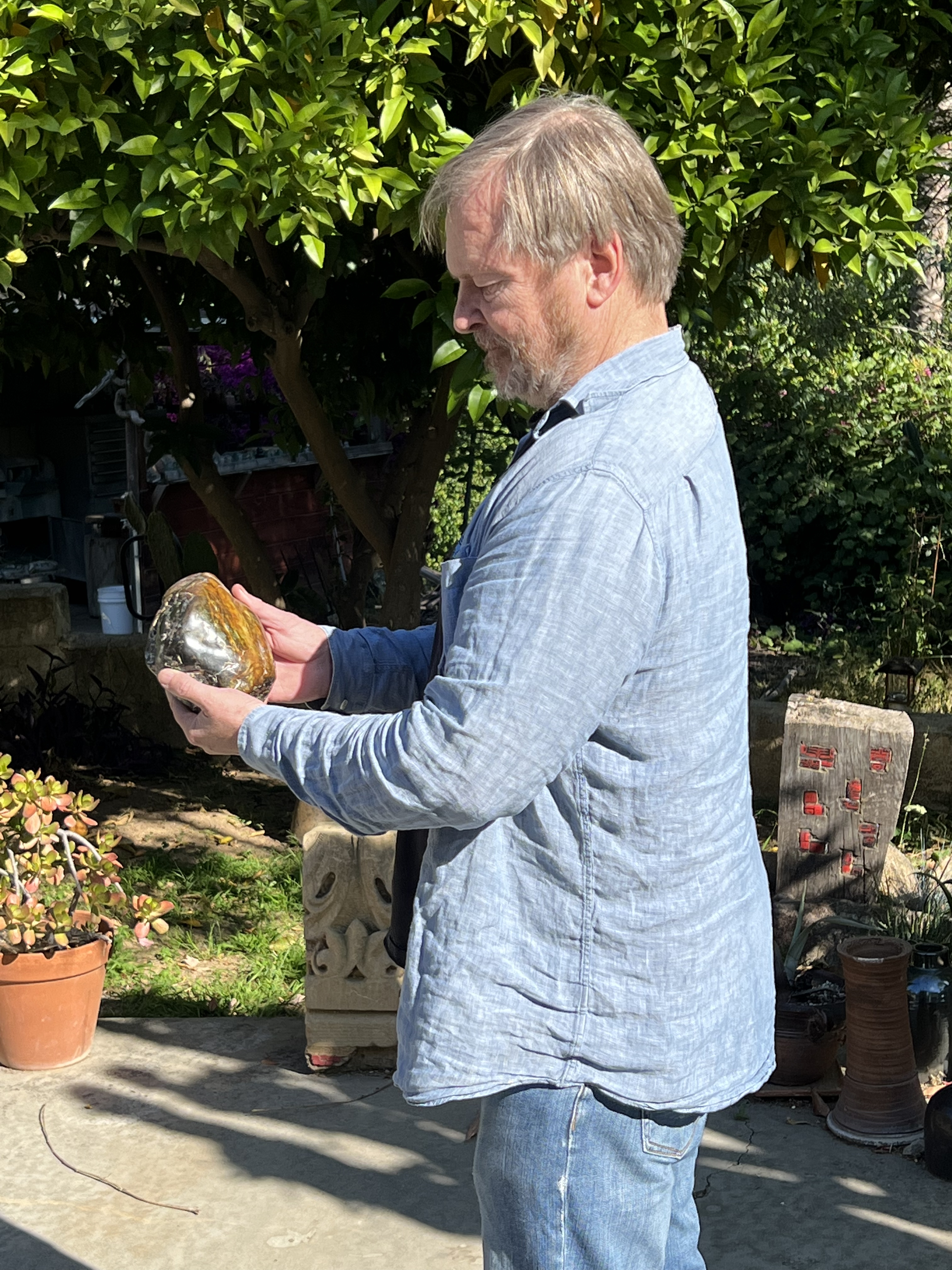
Karl Taube holding a piece of nephrite, one of two distinct mineral species called jade, 2023

An early theme examined by Taube concerns the agricultural development and symbolism of Mesoamerica. A prime example of this is his 1983 presentation to the Fifth Palenque Round Table identifying the Maya maize god and resulting in one of his major articles (1985). Taube has also written on the symbolism and deity associations of maize for other cultures, particularly in his brilliant study of "Lightning Celts and Corn Fetishes" (2000) that connects Olmec maize symbolism with the American Southwest.

Underlying much of Taube's work is his interest in inter– and intra-regional exchanges and contacts between Mesoamerica, Aridoamerica and the American Southwest. An example of the latter was already mentioned; to this could be added his influential 2004 article on the so-called "Flower Mountain", turning on concepts of life, beauty, and Paradise among the Classic Maya.

Taube also researched the interactions between Teotihuacan, a dominant center in Mexico's plateau region during the Classic era of Mesoamerican chronology, and contemporary Maya polities.

Following Taube's sixtieth birthday in 2017, his collected articles in Mesoamerican, especially Mayan, iconography have begun to appear with the Precolumbia Mesoweb Press and online.

In May 2023, Taube wrote about the repatriation of an important Olmec monument, an 'Earth monster', looted from the site of Chalcatzingo, Morelos, Mexico.

In July 2023, Taube delivered a series of public lectures at the Institute of Archeology at the Chinese Academy of Social Sciences and a lecture on Mesoamerican jade in the Forbidden City in Beijing, China.

== Archaeological tours ==
Taube leads educational journeys for Far Horizons Archaeological and Cultural trips

- Taube's tour page Karl Taube
