= Sak Tahn Waax =

8th-century Maya astronomer and mathematician

- Born: circa 8th century CE; Mesoamerica
- Died: 8th–9th century CE; Mesoamerica
- Other name: White-Crested Fox
- Citizenship: Maya civilization
- Scientific career
- Fields: astronomy, mathematics

Sak Tahn Waax ("White-Chested Fox") was an 8th-century Maya astronomer and mathematician from Xultun (now in Guatemala). He is the only Classical Mayan mathematician and astronomer known by name.

== Xultun archaeological site ==
The Structure 10K-2 at Xultun was found in 2010, and was tentatively identified as a codex book writers' workshop. About 52 texts were found on the four walls, which researchers called the "rough drafts" of Maya mathematicians "as they charted and predicted the cycles of celestial objects relative to earth and to one another, and also worked to numerically reconcile such cycles with the other time units from various calendars", and include "a lunar table, a ring number and texts with nested cycles tied to local calculations; several grapple with very large units of time".

== Signature ==
Restoration of Mayan signature of Sak Tahn Waax

His name, written in the classical Maya script, appears next to a calendaric formula (designated as Text 19) found on one of the inner walls of a structure in Xultún, Guatemala, dating to 781 CE. The archeological site has been associated to the Classical Mesoamerican era, spanning 250 to 900 CE. The other inner walls are decorated with painted murals.

== Research ==
Text 19 comprises 11 glyph blocks, 5 of which present specific time cycles. The spacing of calendaric records correspond to different time intervals, and this encoding practice was widespread among Maya scribes. Text 19 uses multiples of the Mayan 20-day month (Haab), the 260-day year (tzolkin), the 360-day year and the orbital period of Mars to obtain the least common multiple between the 365-day solar year and the orbital period of Venus (Venus' synodic period is 584 days). This only occurs approximately every 2,920 days. Text 19 is followed by an attribution, which translates to: "so says Sak Tahn Waax". It is unknown whether this was written by the author or is a reference made by a different person.

== Transcription of Xultún Text 19 ==
Transcription	Translation
4 Ak'bal	
1 Winik ji	1 month of 20 days
11 Ak'bal 6 Paax	
13 Winik ji	13 months of 20 days (1 year tzolk'in)
1 Sak Sihoom	
	2 orbital periods of Mars
1 Paax	
3 Haab	3 years of 360 days
6 Muwaan ni	
Che He Na	according to
Sak Tahn wa xi	White-Chested Fox

== See also ==
- Maya numerals
- Maya calendar
- Maya civilization
