= Flower Mountain =

Flower Mountain is a term from Classic Maya iconography referring to stylized lateral or frontal depictions of an animate mountain, or mountain cave, characterized by the presence of one or more flower symbols at the mountain's 'brow'. This Flower Mountain is repeatedly found associated with solar symbols and depictions of terrestrial water. The earliest representation of a Flower Mountain is found in the Late Preclassic murals of San Bartolo (Maya site).

The icon has been interpreted as (a) the 'Flowering Mountain Earth', a concept of the present-day Tz'utujil Mayas denoting a mountain located at the world's centre, and associated with a tree of life which can take the form of a sprouting maize plant; (b) the paradisiac dwelling place of the ancestors; (c) the Cave of Emergence (Aztec Chicomoztoc); (d) the place of celestial ascent of ancestors and (solar) sky gods; and (e) the mountain containing the maize seeds (Aztec Tonacatepetl).
