= San Bartolo (Maya site) =

Archeological site

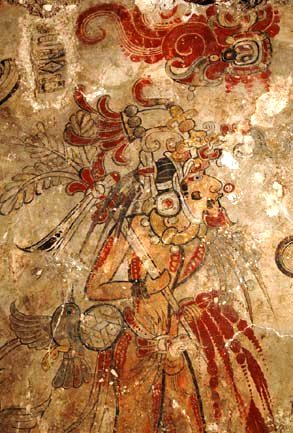
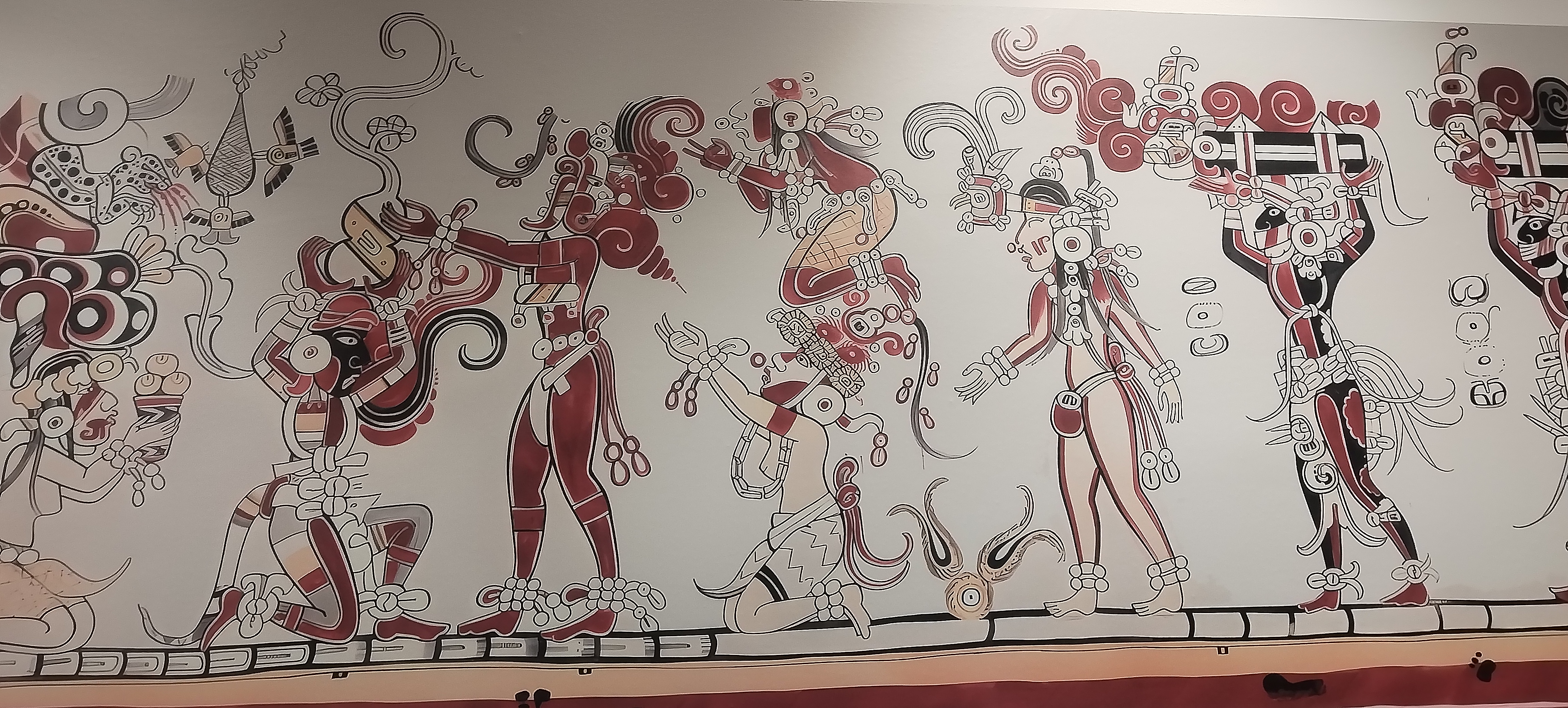
- The king (who impersonates the hero Hunahpú) pierces his penis with a spear to shed sacrificial blood. Exact replica of one of the murals of San Bartolo

- Location within Guatemala
- Periods: Middle Preclassic
- Cultures: Maya
- Location: Flores, Guatemala
- Region: Petén Department

History
- Built: Middle Preclassic
- Abandoned: circa 400 A.D.

Site notes
- Architectural style: Middle Preclassic Maya
- Responsible body: IDAEH

San Bartolo is a small pre-Columbian Maya archaeological site located in the Department of Petén in northern Guatemala, northeast of Tikal and roughly fifty miles from the nearest settlement. San Bartolo's fame derives from its splendid Late-Preclassic mural paintings still heavily influenced by Olmec tradition and from examples of early Maya script.

== Site ==
The Maya site includes an 85-foot pyramid named "Las Ventanas" (The Windows); the Temple of "Las Pinturas" (The Paintings); an early royal tomb in the "Tigrillo Complex" (Ocelot Complex); and (in the "Jabalí" [Wild Boar] group some 500 mt. to the east from the central Plaza) a triadic complex similar to the H group in Uaxactún and Tikal's North Acropolis. The pyramid was constructed from ca 300 BC (base rooms) and was completed ca 50 AD.

San Bartolo is often studied alongside the closely related site of Xultún.

== Murals ==
=== Discovery and reconstruction ===
In 2001, in the base of a pyramid, a team led by William Saturno (a researcher for the Peabody Museum of Archaeology and Ethnology) discovered a room with murals that were carbon-dated as from 100 BC, making them the oldest ones to date. Excavation started in March 2003. The murals were stabilized and a special technique was used for photographically recording the paintings. Fallen fragments were pieced together and also photographed. Detailed reconstruction drawings were made by Heather Hurst. The iconography of the mural scenes was subsequently analyzed and interpreted by project iconographer Karl Taube. Besides the murals, the oldest known Maya royal tomb was discovered in San Bartolo, by archaeologist Monica Pellecer Alecio.

=== Twin myth (Popol Vuh) and maize myth ===
As Saturno, Stuart and Taube have argued, the murals on the northern and western walls of the chamber in the base of the temple pyramid ('Pinturas Sub-1') depict elements of Maya creation mythology reminiscent of the Popol Vuh as well as of Yucatec cosmological traditions.

The north wall mural consists of two scenes. One scene is situated in front of a mountain cave (belonging to the Flower Mountain); several persons are walking and kneeling on a large serpent. The Maya maize god is shown in the midst of a group of men and women, while receiving (or perhaps bequeathing) a vine calabash. The other scene shows four babies, with their umbilical cords still attached, surrounding a calabash, which has now split open and from which a fifth, and fully clothed male emerges. A large deity figure watches the scene.

The west wall mural has a far greater number of scenes. One part of the mural has four successive images of trees with birds, kings with the markings of the Maya Hero Twin Hunahpu, and sacrifices (consisting of fish, deer, turkey, and fragrant blossoms), to which a fifth tree has been added. The five trees are comparable to the directional trees of the Codex Borgia and to those mentioned in the Book of Chilam Balam of Chumayel; the associated birds represent the Principal Bird Deity. The sacrifices are comparable to those in the Year Bearer section of the Dresden Codex. The first four kings are shown piercing their penises (see picture), spilling sacrificial blood, then offering a sacrifice. The fifth figure, associated with a fifth tree belonging to the centre – the tree of life itself – is the Maya maize god. The directional representation as a whole might refer to the initial arrangement of the world.

Another part of the western mural depicts three scenes from the life of the maize god and the coronation of a king, showing divine right to rule coming from the gods, and providing evidence that the Maya had full-fledged monarchies centuries earlier than previously thought. The three maize god scenes show (1) a maize baby held by a man kneeling in the waters; (2) the maize god inside a turtle cave, dancing before two enthroned, aquatic deities; and (3) the maize god flying in the sky, or perhaps falling from the sky down into the water. Scene 3 has been suggested to represent the death of the maize deity. Alternatively, it may refer to the maize god's role as a rain bringer.

=== Other mythological parallels ===
For an explanation of many of the mural scenes, the Popol Vuh hardly offers clues, and scholars have started to look in other directions. The three maize god scenes of the western mural, for example, have been suggested to refer to present-day Gulf Coast myths about a maize god subduing the gods of thunder and lightning and creating the conditions for agriculture. The calabash scene of the northern mural, on the other hand, may constitute (as Van Akkeren has suggested) an illustration of a Pipil myth concerning a group of young boys (rain deities) born, together with their 'youngest brother' (Nanahuatzin), from a gourd tree. In this myth, Nanahuatzin is the one who opens the Maize Mountain and introduces agriculture. At the same time, the author interprets the calabash - now taken as a vine gourd (Maya tsu[y]) - together with its four surrounding babies as a symbol for a place of origins often mentioned in Highland Maya sources, Suywa or Tsuywa, to be situated somewhere in the Gulf Coast region.

== Earliest Maya inscriptions ==
The earliest inscriptions which are identifiably Maya have been found at San Bartolo; they date to the 3rd century BC. In particular, an important stone block text has been found dating to around 300 BC. It has been argued that this text celebrates an upcoming time period ending celebration. This time period may have been projected to end sometime between 7.3.0.0.0 and 7.5.0.0.0 — 295 and 256 BCE, respectively. Besides this being the earliest Maya hieroglyphic text so far uncovered, it would arguably be the earliest existing glyphic evidence of a Mesoamerican Long Count calendar notation in Mesoamerica.

In 2022, scholars working on the San Bartolo-Xultun Regional Archaeological Project presented evidence for the earliest known calendar notation in the Maya region, the 260-day ritual calendar date of "7 Deer," from the mural fragments at San Bartolo. These fragments date between 300 and 200 BCE.
