= Caracol =

Maya archaeological site in Belize

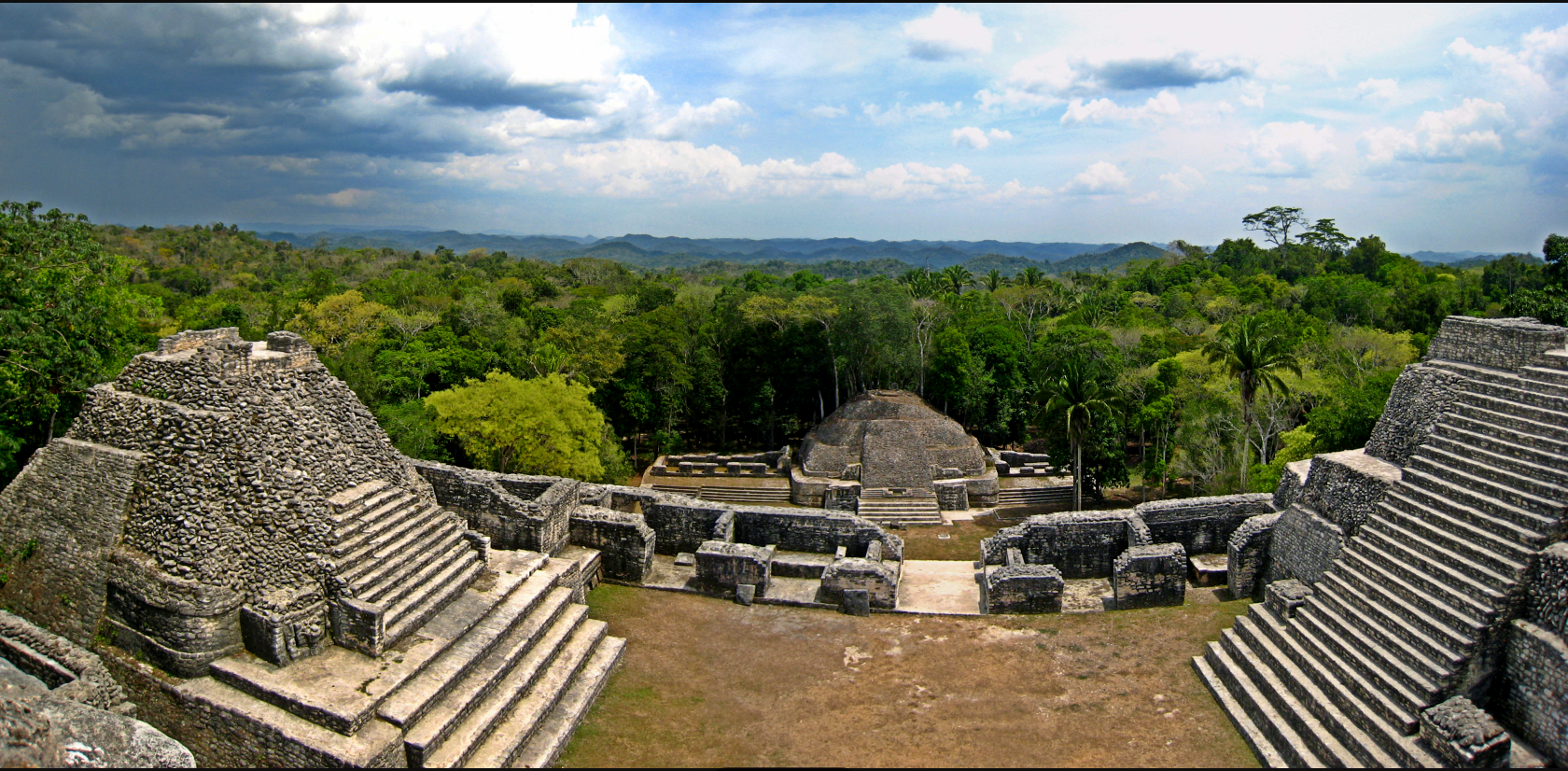
- View from atop of Caracol

- Location within Mesoamerica Location within Belize
- 16°45′50″N 89°7′3″W
- Periods: Preclassic to Postclassic
- Cultures: Maya civilization
- Location: Cayo District, Belize

History
- Built: 1200 BCE

Caracol is a large ancient Maya archaeological site, located in what is now the Cayo District of Belize. It is situated approximately 40 kilometres (25 mi) south of Xunantunich, and the town of San Ignacio, and 15 km (9.3 mi) from the Macal River. It rests on the Vaca Plateau, at an elevation of 500 m (1,600 ft) above sea-level, in the foothills of the Maya Mountains. Long thought to be a tertiary center, it is now known that the site was one of the most important regional political centers of the Maya Lowlands during the Classic Period. Caracol covered approximately 200 square kilometres (77 sq mi), covering an area much larger than present-day Belize City, the largest metropolitan area in the country, and supported more than twice the modern city's population.

== Etymology ==
Caracol is a modern name from the Spanish: caracol ('snail, shell'), but more generally meaning spiral or volute-shaped – apparently on account of the winding access road that led to the site. The ancient Mayan name for the Caracol archaeological site was Uxwitza', meaning "Three Water Hill" or "Three Hills".

== Discovery ==
The site was first reported by a native logger named Rosa Mai, who came across its remains in 1937, while searching for mahogany hardwood trees to exploit. Mai reported the site to the archaeological commission for British Honduras, today Belize. In 1938, the archaeological commissioner A. Hamilton Anderson, visited the site for two weeks along with a colleague, Hugh Blockley Jex, who later became Inspector of Crown Licence. It was Anderson who gave the site its modern name. They conducted preliminary surveys, noted 9 carved monuments, took notes on the structures of the A-Group Plaza, and undertook limited excavations in two locations. Anderson and Linton Satterthwaite later discovered 40 stone monuments.

== Excavations, investigations, and modern development ==
The site was first noted and documented archaeologically in 1937, by Anderson. More extensive explorations and documentation of the site was undertaken by Satterthwaite, of the University of Pennsylvania Museum of Archaeology and Anthropology, from 1950 to 1953. During this time Satterthwaite, primarily focused on finding and documenting monuments, later removing several stelae and altars. This early research resulted in the creation of a map of the central part of the site, the excavation of several tombs, the recording of the site's known stone monuments, and the transportation of about a dozen monuments to the University Museum, in Philadelphia. In the early 1980s, Paul F. Healy, of Trent University investigated Caracol's core area, recording several architectural groups, and noting the extensive terrace systems and high population density for the surrounding area.

The Caracol Archaeological Project, ongoing every year since 1985, is directed by Arlen and Diane Chase. The 1988–1989 field seasons researched the southeast section of the site, between the Conchita and Pajaro-Romonal Causeways, to determine the impact of the Tikal-Naranjo wars. From 1994 to 1996, the project focused investigations in the northeast section of the site, near the Puchituk terminus, which showed great time depth dating to the Middle Preclassic, and on the growth and cohesion of the site during Caracol's two major periods of aggression. In the spring dry season of 2009, they conducted a LiDAR survey with an aircraft that allowed a very rapid assessment of the entire site and surrounds, mapping 200 square kilometres (77 sq mi), with results published in May 2010.

The only road the site can be accessed by is paved for the last 16 km (9.9 mi) and leads to the Western Highway between San Ignacio and Belmopan and to Santa Elena.

Caana ('sky-palace') is the largest building at Caracol, and is the tallest manmade structure in Belize, at 43 m (141 ft) tall.

=== Exploration timeline ===
1936
First reported to Belizean Authorities, as there was a discovery of carved stone monuments with hieroglyphs
1937
Rosa Mai discovers site
1938
A. H. Anderson initially visits Caracol
1950–1953
Linton Satterthwaite and the University Museum conducts investigations focusing on recording monuments, and makes a limited map
1956–1958
A. H. Anderson returns to Caracol and excavates in the A-Group and South Acropolis
1980
Paul Healy of Trent University investigates agricultural terraces and notes unusually high settlement density
1983
Caracol Archaeological Project begins; Structures A6, and B20 investigated
1986
Discovery of Altar 21 leading to the reexamination of the "Classic hiatus"; Painted Tomb of a royal woman found at Caana, dated to AD 634. Conchita and Pajaro-Ramonal Causeways located.
1987
Initiation of settlement research; Causeway system discovered. Causeway mapping began. A 12 m wide causeway was followed to the terminus known as "Cahal Pichik"
1988
Southeast settlement research – Demonstrates the increase in population after the Tikal-Naranjo wars
1989
Southeast sector settlement work continues; Agricultural fields, housing, and causeways demonstrated to be post-war phenomena. Construction on Caana demonstrated to be post-AD 800
1990
Structures A2, A7, and A8 excavated; Early Classic construction of South Acropolis found.
1991
Exploration and mapping of causeways. Ceiba and Retiro Termini located. Structure A6 excavated; found stone box cache with jade mask and mercury. Intact stucco frieze found on earlier construction of Caana. Belize government declares the Caracol area a national park.
1992
Ruler's tomb discovered in the South Acropolis; royal tombs found in the Central Acropolis. Belize government constructs road to the site
1993
Investigations on Canna; royal tomb located in Structure B20; ritual deposits located in B19. Hieroglyphic texts found in non-elite contexts
1994–1995
Northeast sector investigated to determine settlement density and dating; mapping and reconnaissance indicate no settlement drop-off for 6 km (3.7 mi), and the radius of the site determined to be 10 km (6.2 mi) from the Cahal Pichik, Ceiba, Retiro, and Hatzcap Ceel Causeways and Termini
1996
Central 9 square kilometers of the site mapped. Preclassic shrine dated to 100 BC found in front of Structure B34 of the Northeast Acropolis
1997
Mapping of central 16 km^{2} (6.2 sq mi) completed. Southeast sector residential groups with open, collapsed, and looted tombs explored
1998
Basal architecture of Structures A1, A3, and A8 explored. Mapping recorded the Retiro and Ceiba termini and their associated causeways
1999
Basal stairs of Structures A2 and A3 trenched. Residential group immediately north of the center excavated. Mapping recorded an east-west transect 6 km north of the center. Caracol Site Museum opens
2000
Excavations focused on structures within the southwest walled area, and one residential group immediately south of the area. Terraces in the Chaquistero area mapped. Dr. Jaime Awe and the Belize Tourism Development Project (TDP) began "tourist-proofing" Caracol's buildings
2001
Palace structures of Barrio and Caana excavated in preparation for their stabilization. Terminal Classic trash deposits recovered in Barrio; two elite tombs found at the base of Structure B19
2002
Excavations focused on Structures A13, B28, and F4, as well as the plaza in front of Structure B33. A new Stela was found in front of Structure B28; a stucco text was recovered in association with Structure B19. The materials from the TDP's excavations of two residential tombs were analyzed
2003
Excavations focused on five smaller buildings adjacent to the South Acropolis in order to determine the presence attached specialists; TDP begins stabilization of the South Acropolis. Four burials and a collapsed Protoclassic chultun were also recovered.
2004
Continued focus on attached specialists; small structures immediately east of Barrio and West of Caana excavated, recovering Terminal Classic line-of-stone buildings and three Early Classic interments. TDP concluded their work
2005
Investigations focused on locating non-palace Terminal Classic occupation associated with small structures in the center. Excavations of Structure I20 produced late use-related materials and a burial; Structure B59 proved to be of late construction. Structures B40, B42, and B44 showed a series of tombs and caches spanning from the Protoclassic to the Terminal Classic
2006
Investigations of epicentral structures which were utilized within the broad Late and Terminal Classic social and economic system. Excavated structures include A31, the Northwest Acropolis (Structures A61–A69), and the Gateway residential group (Structures B139–143).
2007
Recovery of early caching practices both in the center and in an epicentrally proximate residential group revealed variant caching practices and associated ceremonial activities. These findings raised issues of ritual variability throughout the center and immediately adjacent residential groups. Investigated structures included Structures A16, B7, D2, and I2–I8.
2008
Excavations were undertaken in the Culebras and Palmitas residential groups on either side of the Pajaro-Romonal Causeway to determine whether differential composition of residential complexes existed in close proximity to the center. The causeway running from the center to the Ceiba Terminus was extended and mapped all the way to La Rejolla, a site which exhibited monuments with the Caracol emblem glyph.
2009
The use of LiDAR was introduced to the site and the mapping of 200 square kilometers revealed the presence of eleven new causeways, five new termini, and thousands of residential groups and agricultural terraces. Excavations were also undertaken in the Northeast Acropolis and the Culebras residential group (especially focusing on Structure C20).
2010
Investigations focused on ground-checking the remote sensing data gained from LiDAR in 2009, especially on the location of caves. Excavations focused on Structures F30–F42 of the double plaza complex Alta/Baja Vista, as well as further excavations of the Northeast Acropolis.
2025
Excavations uncovered the tomb of Ajaw Te' K'ab Chaak, founder of the Caracol dynasty, including a mosaic death mask and jadeite jewelry.

== Population ==
At Caracol, there are approximately 267 structures per square kilometer, 85% higher than Tikal. The site covers approximately 200 square kilometers, and within this area, structures are generally situated equidistantly and are integrated with the terrace system. The town grew into one of the largest ancient Maya cities, covering some 177 km^{2} (68 sq mi) with an estimated population of 115,032. This population estimate was based on the number of structures that were occupied, which was about 83.35 percent. The invention of LIDAR has helped discover an increase in population, as it was able to detect more living areas. With LIDAR detection, we are now able to get a more reasonable number of citizens in Caracol, with 68.42 percent to 81.36 percent of the plazuela groups being more identifiable through LIDAR. This comes to the number of residential groups at 7,709. These numbers accumulated by the lidar pose that the population of Caracol is between 70,580 and 101,440 (exclusive of the Guatemalan settlement).

=== Population Expansion ===
During the time of 440 to 550 CE, Caracol underwent a east-west expansion, with a population increase of between 24,367 and 40,024 people. This suggests the likely in-migration with a growth rate of 0.409 percent. In the late Classic 1 (550-680 CE), Caracol underwent a population boom along with its period of warfare of 52,788-86,707 people, indicating the in-migration with a growth of 0.552 percent. In Late Classic 2 (680-800 CE), Caracol would then have a maximum population of between 74,109 and 121,728 people, with a in-migration rate of 0.238 percent. Lastly, in the Terminal Classic (800-900 CE), Caracol's population took a major hit, reducing population size between 39,085 and 64,199 people, showing a decrease in population size of 0.640 percent. Shortly after the decrease in population, excavations were not conducted.

== History ==
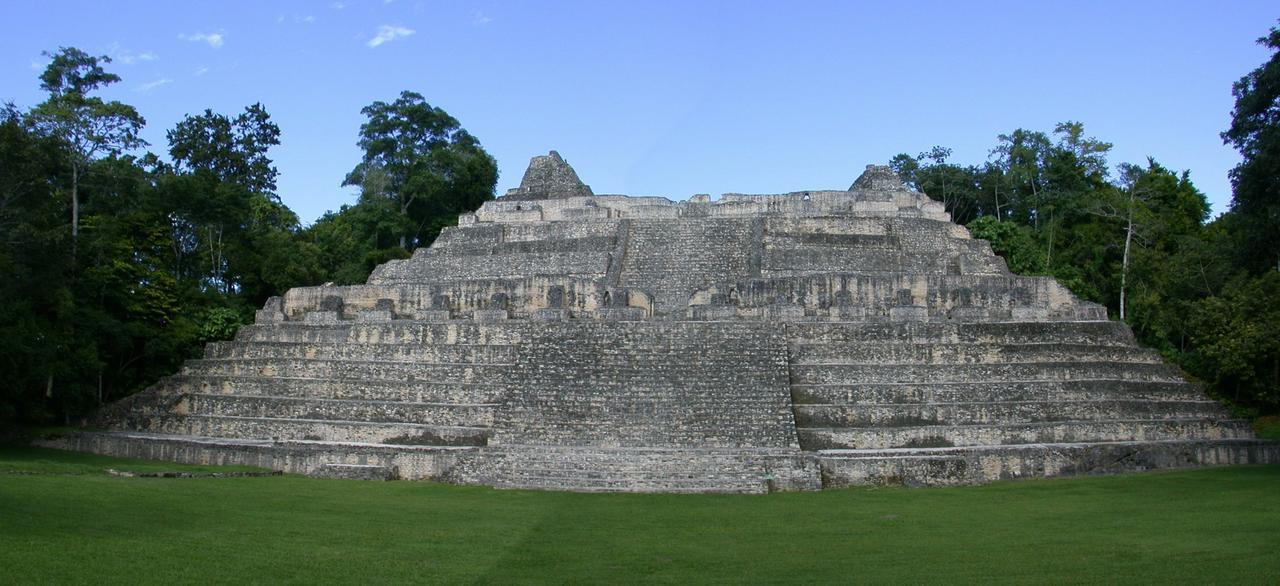
Caana

The Caracol area was occupied as early as 1200 BC, yet occupation in the epicentral area was no earlier than 650 BC and lasted no later than AD 950. Caracol boasts 53 carved stone monuments (25 stelae and 28 altars), and more than 250 burials and 200 caches.

By the Early Classic, between AD 250 and 550, Caracol was tied into extensive trade networks and pan-lowland ideological systems, leading to a unified regional economy. The Caracol was officially founded in AD 331 (8.14.13.10.4) by Te' K'ab Chaak. Special Deposit C117F-1, a Teotihuacan style cremation of three individuals dates precisely to this period, indicating early influences from northern Mexico.

=== Wars with Tikal ===
Caracol was at first a client state of the more powerful city of Tikal, 76 km (47 mi) to the northwest. Tikal's influence weakened during the mid-sixth century; losing control of Naranjo, located halfway between the two cities, 42 km (26 mi) from each site, to rival Calakmul. In AD 531, Lord K'an I, acceded to the throne. Lord Water, (Yajaw Te' K'inich II) acceded to power in AD 553, under the auspices of Tikal's Lord Double Bird (Wak Chan K'awiil). In AD 556, Tikal enacted a ch'ak (axe) war and defeated Caracol. This caused Lord Water to enact the first known star war in 562 (9.6.8.4.2), and defeated Tikal's Lord Wak Chan K'awiil (Double Bird). These poorly understood conflicts are usually associated with long hiatuses and the fall of dynasties. The name comes from the glyph, which shows a star (presumably Venus) pouring liquid on the earth. This particular star war was the cause of the archaeologically and epigraphically demonstrated Tikal mid-Classic hiatus, which saw a decline in Tikal's population, a cessation of monument erection, and the destruction of certain monuments in the Great Plaza. This 120-year-long hiatus at Tikal occurred as Caracol's population and monumental construction increased, becoming more prosperous and cohesive. Tikal took on cultural characteristics of Caracol during this time as, even with the renewed erection of monuments at Tikal, their style mimicked that of Caracol.

Yajaw Te' K'inich II passed on his throne to the eldest of his two sons, Knot Ajaw, in AD 599; his younger brother, K'an II, succeeded him in AD 618. K'an II performed a ritual of alliance in Calakmul's territory the following January (9.9.5.13.8). K'an II is described as the most successful Caracol ruler, reigning for 40 years from AD 618 to 658, he expanded the causeway system and saw an increase in the site's population.

In AD 627 (9.9.14.3.5), Lord K'an II attacked Caracol's sometime ally Naranjo, in a hubi (destruction) war. He attacked again in 628, and sacrificed its king. He then led a star war against Naranjo, in AD 631 (9.9.18.16.3). He did it a fourth time in 636. In AD 637, he celebrated his first reigning k'atun by dedicating the Hieroglyphic Stairway at Naranjo itself.

=== Prosperity ===
Beginning in AD 636, there was a building boom at Caracol at the conclusion of the Tikal-Naranjo wars. Entering the Late Classic period, the site still demonstrated widespread cohesion. During this time Caracol also had a unique burial pattern, focusing on multiple burials in special chambers. This pattern is seen spreading out through the Peten region, likely controlled by Caracol, although this spread is independent of other material cultural indicators, like caching practices. K'an II commissioned more monuments than any other ruler, and ushered in the "golden age" of Caracol.

Twenty nine days before his death, K'an II "witnessed" the accession of his successor, K'ahk' Ujol K'inich II, on 9.11.5.14.0 – AD 658. During K'ahk' Ujol K'inich II's reign, Caracol was defeated in a star war by Naranjo, whose only monuments appear at La Rejolla.

Lasting from AD 702 (Stela 21) to 798 (Ballcourt Marker 3), this period lacks any hieroglyphic texts. Archaeologically, this period is correlated with an increase in site-wide prosperity. After the AD 798 date, the site core is still prosperous, yet shows less cohesion between the centre and outlying areas.

Warfare associated with K'inich Joy K'awil, on Stela 11 (erected AD 800), indicates the capture of eight captives. In 800 CE, K'inich Joy K'awiil captured the lord of Ucanal. Caana was also refinished during this period.

K'inich Toobil Yopaat's accession date is not certain (c. AD 804), but he erected five or six monuments, and seems to have repaired relations with Ucanal. In AD 820, he enacted an axe war against Tikal.

=== Collapse ===
Evidence suggests that Caracol weathered the initial part of the Maya collapse. Through symbolic egalitarianism, it seems that the majority of the Late Classic population had access to "elite" material goods. However, the transition to the Terminal Classic sees a shift away from symbolic egalitarianism, when the elite developed their own ceramic traditions and had access to goods no longer available to the populace.

The last recorded date at Caracol is AD 859 – 10.1.10.0.0, on Stele 10. Caana's abandonment dates to approximately AD 900; several other structures have occupation that dates to the Terminal Classic period. Structure A6 was abandoned in AD 1050, and marks the final abandonment of the site.

== Known war events ==
Date	Victor	Defeated	Nature of warfare
9.6.2.1.11	Tikal	Caracol	Axe event
9.6.8.4.2	Caracol	Tikal	Star war
9.9.13.4.4	Caracol	Naranjo	Hubi (destruction)
9.9.14.3.5	Caracol	Naranjo	Hubi
9.9.18.16.3	Caracol	Naranjo	Star war
9.10.3.2.12	Caracol	Naranjo	Star war
9.12.7.14.1	Naranjo	Caracol	Star war
Pre-9.18.10.0.0	Caracol	Ucanal	Capture ?
Post-9.19.9.9.15	Caracol	Tikal	Axe event

== Monument chronology ==
Gregorian date	Long Count	Altars	Stelae
AD 400	8.18.4.4.14		Stela 20
AD 495	9.3.0.0.0 2 Ajaw	Altar 4	
AD 504	9.3.10.0.0	Altar 19	
AD 514	9.4.0.0.0 13 Ajaw	Altar 7	Stela 13
AD 534	9.5.0.0.0 11 Ajaw	Altars 3, 14 ??	Stela 16
AD 554	9.6.0.0.0 9 Ajaw	Altar 5	Stela 14
AD 573	9.7.0.0.0 7 Ajaw	Altar 6	Stela 15
AD 583	9.7.10.0.0	Altar 24	Stela 4
AD 593	9.8.0.0.0 5 Ajaw	Altar 1	Stela 1
AD 603	9.8.10.0.0		Stela 6
AD 613	9.9.0.0.0 3 Ajaw	Altars 11, 15	Stela 5
AD 633	9.10.0.0.0 1 Ajaw	Altar 21	Stelae 7, 22
AD 652	9.11.0.0.0 12 Ajaw	Altars 7, 17	Stela 3
AD 702	9.13.10.0.0		Stela 21
AD 798	9.18.8.3.9	Ballcourt Marker 3	
AD 799	9.18.9.5.9	Ballcourt Marker 4	
AD 800	9.18.10.0.0	Altar 23	Stela 11
AD 810	9.19.0.0.0 9 Ajaw	Altar 22	Stelae 8, 9, 18
AD 820	9.19.10.0.0	Altars 12, 13	Stela 19
AD 830	10.0.0.0.0 7 Ajaw	Altar 16	
AD 849	10.1.0.0.0 5 Ajaw	Altars 18, 10	Stela 17
AD 859	10.1.10.0.0 1 Ajaw		Stela 10

== Monuments ==
=== Stelae ===
==== Stela 1 ====
- Potentially posthumous monument erected by K'an II, to solidify his rule by referring to Lord Water, but not his predecessor Knot Ahau
- Martin and Grube say that it was erected by Yajaw Te' K'inich along with Altar 1 to mark the 9.8.0.0.0 K'atun ending (AD 593)
- Located behind structure A1 with cached vessels below it, and a small "transformational tomb" behind it containing three cremated individuals
- Found standing and unfragmented by A. H. Anderson in 1938, later excavations by the University Museum in 1950 revealed its association with Altar 1

==== Stela 2 ====
- Discovered during the 1951 season fragmented into seven pieces scattered over an area of roughly 1.5 meters, located in the corridor between Structure A10 and the platform holding Structure A6. Only the upper 1.39 meters was found, 87 cm wide by 40 cm thick with a central segment of the shaft measuring c. 86 cm high. It depicts an eroded ruler from the waist up, marching forward, holding the bicephalic ceremonial bar. Only a partial date survives leading to a range from AD 613 to AD 657.

==== Stela 3 ====
- Found broken in two major fragments, one found in 1950 in Plaza A3, the lower portion found in 1953 at the west edge of Reservoir B. The lower portion did not seem to have been re-erected, nor was it associated with any other monuments or construction features
- Dedicated at 9.11.0.0.0 – AD 652 by K'an II at his accession (AD 618), it also references his 1st penis perforation at age 5 under the direction of his father, Yajaw Te' K'inich II (Lord Water)
- May portray Batz' Ek', who may have served as K'an II's regent/surrogate parent, or his mother. The text includes the "arrival" verb (at 9.7.10.16.8 and again at 9.9.9.10.5, although the presence of two arrivals is not thoroughly explained), indicating that whoever Batz' Ek' was, they were foreign to Caracol. Batz' Ek' is an enigmatic character, who on this stela bears the Snake emblem glyph yet may in fact be from Site Q.
- Shows Site Q emblem glyph in clauses showing its secondary importance

==== Stela 4 ====
- Probably from AD 583 (9.7.10.0.0), depicts Yajaw Te' K'inich (Lord Water)
- Found in 1950 by A. H. Anderson in Plaza A3, when excavation showed that this was not the monument's original placement

==== Stela 5 ====
- Marks the 9th K'atun ending in AD 613 - 9.9.0.0.0
- Elaborate Early classic style, showing Knot Ajaw holding the ceremonial bar, surrounded by open portals with emerging named ancestors
- The northernmost in a line of stelae (including Stelae 6 and 7) discovered in front of Structure A13. None of these stelae had associated altars, yet a sub-altar cache was found in front of Stela 5 (although this may represent a later offering) which could indicate the previous presence of a giant Ajaw altar

==== Stela 6 ====
- Discovered with Stelae 5 and 7 in front of Structure A13 in 1950, and tentatively dates to 9.8.10.0.0
- First stela erected by Knot Ajaw in AD 603 (9.8.10.0.0?)
- Originally had over 144 glyphs, and depicted twin portraits of Knot Ajaw and his father, Lord Water
- Makes note of Lord Chekaj K'inich who also carries the Caracol emblem glyph, and may be the younger brother of Lord Water (Yajaw Te' K'inich)

==== Stela 7 ====
- Dating to 9.10.0.0.0 1 Ajaw – AD 633
- Placed at the southern end of the line formed with Stelae 5 and 6 at Structure A13

==== Stela 8 ====
- Located in the A-Group Plaza by the western base of Structure A6. The main portion of the stela, found by A. H. Anderson in the mid-1950s, was recorded and reburied at the site. It measured at least 2.55 meters high, 1.18 meters wide and 0.52 cm thick. In 2014 a new fragment, 78 cm long by 34 cm wide and 25 cm thick, apparently originally found by Anderson and misplaced, was recovered in a farmer's yard. The additional glyphs allowed the stela to be dated to June, AD 810.

==== Stela 9 ====
- Was unfortunately located under a logging road, and is heavily damaged and broken. Associated with Altar 4, both monuments were in the center of the A-Group Plaza along the east-west axis facing Platform A10
- Seems to have a different dating than Altar 4, leading Beetz and Satterthwaite to suggest that they were not an original pair
- Similar to Stelae 8 and 11 in the same plaza, which depict a ruler with the ceremonial serpent bar, potentially dating between 9.18.0.0.0 and 10.0.0.0.0

==== Stela 10 ====
- Found in the A-Group Plaza, it displays a glyphic text on one face making it unusual in the Caracol corpus. Other similar monuments from Uaxactun (Stela 10) or Jimbal (Stela 2) date to Baktun 10
- Dedication date of 10.1.10.0.0 – AD 859

==== Stela 11 ====
- Erected by K'inich Joy Kawiil in AD 800 (9.18.10.0.0) in the A-Group Plaza (Martin and Grube 2008)
- Suggests that Tum Yohl K'inich is K'inich Joy Kawiil's father, or potentially a related high-ranking military leader
- Discovered in 1953 along the east-west axis of the plaza, near but not paired with Altar 19

==== Stela 12 ====
- Found in the A-Group Plaza at the base of Platform A1a, just south of Stela 20. The building sequence indicated that Stela 12 preceded the construction of Platform A1a
- When discovered, A. H. Anderson noted that the stela was devoid of any carving, and entirely plain. While this may be an uncarved monument, it is also likely that erosion destroyed any carving that may have once been present

==== Stela 13 ====
- Located in the front of Structure A4 on Platform A1, and situated near Stela 14, 15, and 16, and Altar 7. It is one of the few Early Classic monuments left in situ by early excavations.
- The iconography on the front closely resembles that of Stela 16, and the back contains enough legible glyphs that the date 9.4.0.0.0 can be assigned to the monument, placing it in the reign of Yajaw Te' K'inich I. This date makes it the second oldest stela at the site, and confirms the existence of a royal dynasty at Caracol. The iconography is standard Early Classic, with the ruler holding the ceremonial bar while wearing a god mask.

==== Stela 14 ====
- Erected by Yajaw Te' K'inich II in AD 554 to commemorate the K'atun ending 9.6.0.0.0
- Found on Platform A1 near Stelae 13, 15, and 16, and in association with Altar 7
- It was originally thought to be uncarved when first discovered, yet it is actually finely incised and depicts a ruler seated holding the ceremonial bar over a 42 block glyphic text

==== Stela 15 ====
- Dedicated in AD 573 – 9.7.0.0.0 7Ajaw
- Completes the grouping on Platform A1 which includes 13, 14, 16, and Altar 7. It is primarily glyphic, although there are small and eroded figures at the top of the monument
- Records the accession of K'an I in AD 531, and a ch'ak (axe) event against Caracol by the Snake polity and Tikal

==== Stela 16 ====
- K'an I's only K'atun ending in AD 534 (9.5.0.0.0), erected on Platform A1
- Gives a genealogy and includes his grandfather K'ahk' Ujol K'inich I, a royal woman from Xultun, and both of his parents.
- Also mentioned is Lord Bahlam Nehn of Copan, although his appearance is unclear
- It is comparatively well preserved, and depicts the ruler with the ceremonial bar standing above three smaller seated figures which appear below the ground line
- In the monument grouping that includes Stelae 13, 14, 15, and Altar 7. Along with Stela 15, it seems to have been broken in antiquity and buried beneath Altar 7.

==== Stela 17 ====
- Erected by K'an III, it is associated with Altar 10 to the southeast of B-Group
- It depicts two seated lords facing each other and accompanied by glyphic texts, dating to AD 849 - 10.1.0.0.0. Originally it seems that there was also carving on the sides, with four large cartouches on each side presumably with one large glyph block in each, although these are now eroded and illegible

==== Stela 18 ====
- Badly eroded, but shows a full figured vision serpent over the body of a bound captive
- Erected by K'inich Toobil Yopaat to mark the end of the 19th K'atun, 9.19.0.0.0 (AD 810)
- Found in the B-Group Plaza, to the west of Structure B28

==== Stela 19 ====
- Erected by K'inich Toobil Yopaat in AD 820 – 9.19.10.0.0
- Associated with Altar 12 at the southern end of the B-Group Plaza in front of Structure B5, facing Caana.
- Once the tallest stela at Caracol, it is now broken into several eroded fragments. Only six glyph blocks partially remain on the front, which while eroded, clearly shows the outline of a ruler holding the ceremonial bar.
- Each side of the monument displayed two cartouches with four glyph blocks each, although those on the left side are broken and eroded. The legible text on the right side seems to be a continuation of the text on the left side, and begins with a glyph that resembles the Site Q emblem. The text also references the two Paddler Gods, who appeared in a vision of K'inich Toobil Yopaat.

==== Stela 20 ====
- Only the upper portion is known, and it gives a date of what is likely an accession, but neither the date nor the ruler's name are included in the surviving text
- Located on the front of Platform A1a, and is also nearly associated with Stela 12 which both broke and fell into the plaza below
- On the lower portion of the stela, the outlines of four cartouches can still be seen, although their glyphs are illegible. On the upper portion of the stela are two facing seated individuals with two eroded glyphic text in between. In the upper left corner appear the jaws of what Beetz and Satterthwaite describe as a serpent

==== Stela 21 ====
- The top left portion of the stela is broken off, and the lowest row of glyph blocks have broken off and eroded
- Depicts an unknown Caracol lord (Ruler VII), shown with a kneeling captive identified as a k'uhul ajaw ('holy lord') of Ixkun, although his name glyph is also illegible
- Dates to AD 702 – 9.13.10.0.0
- Found buried beneath the floor of A-Group Plaza by A. H. Anderson, its original location is unknown, although it is speculated that it may have fallen from Platform A1

==== Stela 22 ====
- Found at the summit of Structure A2 in association with Altar 17. It once had a hieroglyphic text which covered the entire face of the monument; this text is now badly eroded. Two small figures were carved on the top corners of the monument, sitting crossed legged facing each other.
- Surviving text relates events from the reign of K'an II. Importantly, this stela relates the arrival date of Batz' Ek' to Caracol at 9.9.9.10.5. This date is also associated with an event with a ruler of Site Q, leading Grube to suggest that this indicates that Batz' Ek' was a woman from Site Q who helped establish an alliance between the two centers. This alliance eventually led to the combined defeat of Naranjo, which is mentioned later in the legible text.
- The last date appearing on the stela is at 9.10.0.0.0, at which time the monument was presumably dedicated atop Structure A2

==== Stela 23 ====
- Only a partial stela, found intentionally broken and placed beneath Altar 17 at the summit of Structure A2.
- No iconography exists, and only a small amount of text survives. Shows a date that falls between AD 361 and AD 420 and references yajaw te' which may be referencing a recurring royal name: Yajaw Te' K'inich

==== Stela 24 ====
- Found in front of the eastern building of the elite residential group associated with the Puchituk Terminus plaza
- Finger bowl caches and broken jadeite artifacts were associated with its erection
- Only a small portion of the original carving exists; no glyphic text. It depicts a ruler below the waist, and a jaguar figure emerging from a serpentine mouth. A second figure appears on the left, but only a hand is still visible.

=== Altars ===
==== Altar 1 ====
- A giant Ajaw altar placed by Yajaw Te' K'inich to mark the 9.8.0.0.0 5 Ajaw K'atun ending (AD 593) along with Stela 1
- Excavations by the University Museum in 1950 revealed its association with Stela 1

==== Altar 2 ====
- A giant Ajaw altar located in Plaza A3 at the east edge of Platform A1, which Beetz and Satterthwaite suggest was a secondary placement because of its uncertain relationship to the plaza floor
- 9.17.0.0.0 13 Ajaw?, although its lack of associated monuments and eroded state make this date tentative

==== Altar 3 ====
- A giant Ajaw altar dating to 9.5.0.0.0 11 Ajaw or 9.18.0.0.0 11 Ajaw
- Found in front of Structure A1, resting on three limestone legs which were embedded in the plaza floor and associated with the northern, western, and southeastern axis's
- Altar 14 is also dated 11 Ajaw, although Beetz and Satterthwaite assign this monument to an earlier date of 9.5.0.0.0, Mathews dates Altar 3 to the earlier date

==== Altar 4 ====
- Dated to 9.3.0.0.0 2 Ajaw, this giant Ajaw altar is associated with Stela 9 in front of Platform A10 in the A-Group Plaza.

==== Altar 5 ====
- A giant Ajaw altar found west of Altar 6 and in front of Structure A3
- B and S suggest that it dates to 9.6.0.0.0 9 Ajaw, although it is too highly eroded to be certain. They also suggest that this altar may have originally been paired with Stela 14 which tentatively marks the same K'atun ending

==== Altar 6 ====
- This giant Ajaw altar was found along the north-south axis of Plaza A, and dated based largely on iconography to 9.7.0.0.0. It was also seated on three limestone legs resting on a plaster floor, similar to Altar 3
- Altar 16 also has the 7 Ajaw date, but is dated 260 tuns later because of its size, associated stela, and iconographic traits

==== Altar 7 ====
- Well preserved giant Ajaw altar found on Platform A1 beneath the broken portion of Stela 14, near Stelae 13, 15, and 16. Dates to 9.4.0.0.0 13 Ajaw
- A disturbed sub-altar cache may indicate the removal of an earlier altar originally associated with Stela 14; the later placement of a cache containing Late Classic materials was found undisturbed immediately below this altar

==== Altars 8 and 9 ====
- Plain and uncarved monuments which some have suggested are not monuments at all
- Located in Plaza A3, yet are not associated with any structures or carved monuments

==== Altar 10 ====
- Found under the fallen portion of Stela 17 to the southeast of B-Group, and presumably dating to the same period as the stela (10.1.0.0.0?)
- It is badly eroded, but the outlines of three figures with the same style headdresses can be seen, along with a few legible glyph blocks

==== Altar 11 ====
- Highly eroded giant Ajaw altar, it is almost unrecognizable except for the scalloped quatrefoil surround and potentially a dot and bar coefficient
- It was situated at the northern edge of Structure B2, potentially placed along the centerline of the structure, although it was not associated with any caches or stelae
- Located on top of several square limestone blocks which appeared to be secondary altar supports, which contrasts the rounded leg supports for Altars 3 and 6, further suggests that this was a secondary placement
- Beetz and Satterthwaite suggest the 9.9.0.0.0 3 Ajaw dedicatory date for this monument based on their reconstruction of the dates for Stelae 5 and 6 which would both require a coefficient 3 Ajaw on giant Ajaw altars if erected on the K'atun ending

==== Altar 12 ====
- Dedicated by K'inich Toobil Yopaat in AD 820 (9.19.10.0.0) and associated with Stela 19 at the southern end of the B-Group Plaza facing Caana
- Depicts Toobil Yopaat of Caracol and Lord Papamalil of Ucanal (who was by this time an ally of Caracol) each seated on anthropomorphic head thrones facing each other, potentially engaged in a palanquin event at Ucanal. The text mentions a scattering event undertaken by the Ucanal lord which was overseen by Toobil Yopaat.
- It goes on to describe a ch'ak event against k'ul mutul (probably Tikal) during which a captive was taken by a Caracol ruler who bears the bakab title.

==== Altar 13 ====
- Found in front of Caana at the southern end of the B-Group Plaza with Stela 19 and Altar 12
- Dating to 9.19.10.0.0 (AD 820), Beetz and Satterthwaite hypothesize that this altar may have been associated with Stela 18, although this matter cannot be relied upon until further excavation reveals the base of the stela in situ
- It depicts an event taking place within a quatrefoil with water and earth symbols at the four corners. There are three figures within the cartouche, the first figure seems to be presenting a bound captive to a Lord

==== Altar 14 ====
- A giant Ajaw altar potentially dating to 9.5.0.0.0 11 Ajaw, this altar was found along the north-south axis of A-Group Plaza near Stela 8. It was located above a well-preserved fragment of Altar 15, and while there was no formal cache, this fragment might be constituted as such
- The occurrence of an 11 Ajaw date also appears on Altar 3, but Altar 14 appears to be earlier, and may have originally been paired with Stela 16

==== Altar 15 ====
- A fragment found in the A-Group Plaza along the north-south axis below Altar 14
- Potentially dated to 9.9.0.0.0 3 Ajaw, it was probably originally paired with a stela (possibly Stela 5)

==== Altar 16 ====
- Isolated at the southern base of Structure B19 (from which it presumably fell in antiquity), it was not associated with a stela, and is the smallest of all the giant Ajaw altars.
- Dated to 10.0.0.0.0 7 Ajaw

==== Altar 17 ====
- This giant Ajaw altar dating to 9.11.0.0.0 was found resting on edge near the top of Structure A2, erected on K'atun before Altar 17. Only the upper portion of the stela exists, although it once had 12 small cartouches around the rim. It is also the last giant Ajaw altar known from Caracol.
- Stylistically similar to Altar 2 with small glyph cartouches around the central Ajaw, this pair is distinct from the other known altars. Beetz and Satterthwaite argue that like Altar 2, Altar 17 was not originally paired with a stela.

==== Altar 18 ====
- Discovered on the south slope of Structure B6, it is a severely weathered giant Ajaw altar
- While Beetz and Satterthwaite suggest a 10.1.0.0.0 5 Ajaw date, this date is tentative because of the level of erosion

==== Altar 19 ====
- A giant Ajaw Altar found near Stela 11 in the A-Group Plaza and possibly dating to 9.3.10.0.0
- Because the known giant Ajaw altars are paired with carved stelae, Beetz and Satterthwaite suggest that it may have been paired with Stela 7 at the base of Structure A13, which would create an east-west alignment

==== Altar 21 ====
- One of the giant Ajaw altars commissioned by K'an II in AD 633 to commemorate the 9.10.0.0.0 K'atun ending
- References K'an II's birth date, but the majority of the text deals with Yajaw Te' K'inich II
- It tells that Yajaw Te' K'inich II's accession takes place under the auspices of the Tikal lord Wak chan K'awiil
- Also references the ch'ak event by Tikal against Caracol in AD 556, and the later defeat of Tikal in a star war event by Yajaw Te' K'inich II at 9.6.8.4.2 – AD 562 and interactions with the Snake polity
- Placed in the A-Group Ballcourt as the center marker

==== Altar 22 ====
- Discovered in the Plaza of the Two Stelae, a residential area connected with the B Plaza by a causeway. Found in front of two uncarved stelae, it dates to 9 Ahau 18 Mol, the katun ending 9.19.0.0.0 (AD June 26, 810). It was erected by K'inich Joy K'awiil and its iconography repeats that of the earlier Altar 23 – two bound captives sit on Cauac-thrones. This altar deviates from Altar 23 because of its ballgame iconography and titles.

==== Altar 23 ====
- Dedicated by K'inich Joy K'awiil in AD 800 (9.18.10.0.0) in the B Plaza west of Structure B28, placed at the same time Stela 11 was erected in the A Plaza.
- Depicts two bound lords from Ucanal and Bital, whose capture is credited to Tum Yohl K'inich, a 3 K'atun Ajaw with the Bacab title and Caracol emblem glyph. This figure is the predecessor of K'inich Joy K'awiil, and may also be his father.

==== Altar 24 ====
- Found in the El Chaquistero group in 1991 on the second highest structure in the group.
- A giant Ajaw altar dedicated by Yajaw Te' K'inich II on 9.7.0.0.0. It is one of the first monument erected at Caracol after the successful star war against Tikal.

==== Altar 25 ====
- Found in the eastern courtyard adjoining the Barrio palace compound in 2001. The Terminal Classic altar measures 42.5 cm in height, 44 cm in width, and is 35.5 cm thick. It is inscribed with one large glyph of a stylized moon crescent enclosing a seated female silhouette, representing the moon goddess.

==== Altar 26 ====
- During the 2015 season a small (73.6 cm in height, 63.6 cm in width, 12.5 to 13.5 cm thick) Terminal Classic altar was found at the southern summit of Structure A13. It contains a date of 10.2.15.0.0 or AD 824.

=== Ballcourt markers ===
==== Ballcourt markers 1 and 2 ====
- Both badly eroded, but are obviously a stylistic set. Both show two figures facing away from each other, one a god head and the other an animal. Ballcourt Marker (BCM) 1 shows a rabbit head facing away from an image of the Sun God.
- BCM 2 depicts a jaguar head facing away from what is likely an image of God N emerging from his shell.
- BCM 1 was found 8m southeast of Ballcourt A, and BCM 2 was found in the center of Ballcourt B.

==== Ballcourt marker 3 ====
- Discovered northwest of the B-Group Ballcourt.
- Erected by K'inich Joy K'awiil, and associates him with the date 9.18.8.3.9 (AD 798) which is the first date after the epigraphic hiatus.
- It refers back in time to the dynastic founding which took place in AD 331 (8.14.13.10.4)

==== Ballcourt marker 4 ====
- Located at the southern end of the B Ballcourt
- Has the same glyphic arrangement as BCM 3, yet dates one year later at 9.18.9.5.9 (AD 799). The text describes the accession of K'inich Joy K'awiil, as well as the presentation of a monument

== Timeline ==
1200 BC – 250 AD Preclassic small sedentary villages followed by development of monumentality and larger centers

c. 900–600 BC Earliest archaeologically known habitation at Caracol proper

c. AD 70 Structure A6-1st, "Temple of the Wooden Lintel", constructed and consecrated; locus B34 burial; full Maya ritual complex present at Caracol

c. AD 150 Elaborate burial placed in Structure B34 locus

AD 250–900 Classic "Peak" of Maya civilization; pyramids, tombs, inscriptions, widespread trade; by AD 800 Maya "collapse" is underway.

c. AD 330 Teotihuacan style cremation with three people (S.D. C117F-1) placed in the plaza of the Northeast Acropolis

AD 331 (8.14.13.10.4) Caracol Royal dynasty "officially" founded by Te' K'ab Chaak (Tree Branch Rain God), Caracol's dynastic progenitor

AD 400 (8.18.4.4.14) Stela 20 dedicated

c. AD 480 Unknown ruler's tomb placed in Structure D16

AD 484 (9.2.9.0.16) Accession of Lord Yajaw Te' K'inich I

AD 495 (9.3.0.0.0) Altar 4 dedicated

AD 504 (9.3.10.0.0) Altar 19 dedicated

AD 514 (9.4.0.0.0) Altar 7 and Stela 13 dedicated

AD 531 (9.4.16.13.3) Accession of K'an I

AD 534 (9.5.0.0.0) Dedication of Altars 3 (?) and 14, and Stela 13

AD 537 Use of initial tomb in Structure B20-3rd.

AD 553 (9.5.19.1.2) Accession of Caracol Ruler Lord Water (Yajaw Te' K'inich II)

AD 554 (9.6.0.0.0) Altar 5 and Stela 14 dedicated

AD 556 (9.6.5.1.11) Tikal exacted a ch'ak (axe) war on Caracol; Tikal wins upper hand in this first war at Caracol.

AD 562 (9.6.8.4.2) "Star-War" defeat of Tikal Lord Wak Chan K'awiil by Caracol

AD 566 Batz Ek born

AD 573 (9.7.0.0.0) Dedication of Altars 6, 24 and Stela 15

AD 575 (9.7.2.0.3) Birth of Knot Ahau

AD 577 One of three tombs in Structure B20-2nd used.

AD 577 or 582 Front tomb in Structure A34 consecrated

AD 583 (9.7.10.0.0) Stela 4 dedicated

AD 588 (9.7.14.10.8) Birth of Caracol Ruler K'an II.

AD 593 (9.8.0.0.0) Altar 1 and Stela 1 erected

AD 599 (9.8.5.16.12) Accession of Caracol Lord Knot Ahau.

AD 603 (9.8.10.0.0) Stela 6 dedicated

AD 613 (9.9.0.0.0) Altars 15 and 11, and Stela 5 dedicated

AD 614 Tomb in Structure L3-2nd covered.

AD 618 (9.9.4.16.2) Accession of K'an II.

AD 626 and 628 (9.9.13.4.4) Naranjo defeated in two Hubi war events; major expansion of Caracol follows.

AD 631 (9.9.18.16.3) Caracol wins star war against Naranjo; texts erected at Naranjo celebrating Caracol lords

AD 633 (9.10.0.0.0) Altar 21 and Stela 7 dedicated

AD 634 Woman's tomb in Structure B19-2nd closed.

AD 652 (9.11.0.0.0) Stela 3 dedicated

AD 658 (9.11.5.15.9) Death of K'an II. Accession of Lord Smoke Skull (K'ahk' Ujol K'inich II) who is only known from monuments at La Rejolla

AD 680 (9.12.7.14.1) Naranjo gains independence in star war.

AD 696 Tomb in Structure A3-1st covered

AD 702 (9.13.10.0.0) Stela 21 erected and capture of Ixkun lord noted Beginning of Caracol's epigraphic hiatus (AD 702–798)

AD 790 (9.18.0.0.0) Warfare associated with K'inich Joy K'awil on Stela 11 (erected AD 800), indicating the capture of eight people (two of which are shown on Altar 23, and another on Stela 17); potential erection date for Altar 3 (?)

AD 799 (9.18.9.5.9) Accession of Lord K'inich Joy K'awiil

AD 800 (9.18.10.0.0) Erection of Stela 11 and Altar 23 Capture of 3 prisoners, including Ucanal lord, by Caracol Ruler Joy K'awiil

AD 804 (9.18.13.10.19) Potential accession of K'inich Toobil Yopaat

AD 810 (9.19.0.0.0) Stelae 8, 9, and 18 erected

AD 820 (9.19.10.0.0) Altars 12, 13, and Stela 19 dedicated Ch'ak event against k'ul mutul (probably Tikal) recorded on Altar 12

AD 830 (10.0.0.0.0) Altar 16 dedicated

AD 849 (10.1.0.0.0) Altar 18 and Stela 17 dedicated

AD 859 (10.1.10.0.0) Last recorded date at Caracol on Stela 10.

AD 900–1500 Caracol centre abandoned entering the Postclassic. Most major sites are located away from Classic Period centres, but near water. Sites are generally characterized by low-lying as opposed to monumental architecture.

c. AD 1050 Last use of Caracol Structure A6; Caracol totally abandoned.

AD 1500–present "Historic" era begins when Europeans arrive in the New World; most native Maya populations decimated by disease; others disrupted by warfare and forced population movements. Native populations still comprise over 50% of Guatemala and Yucatán.

== Lords of Caracol ==
Note that this list is not continuous, as the epigraphic record is incomplete.

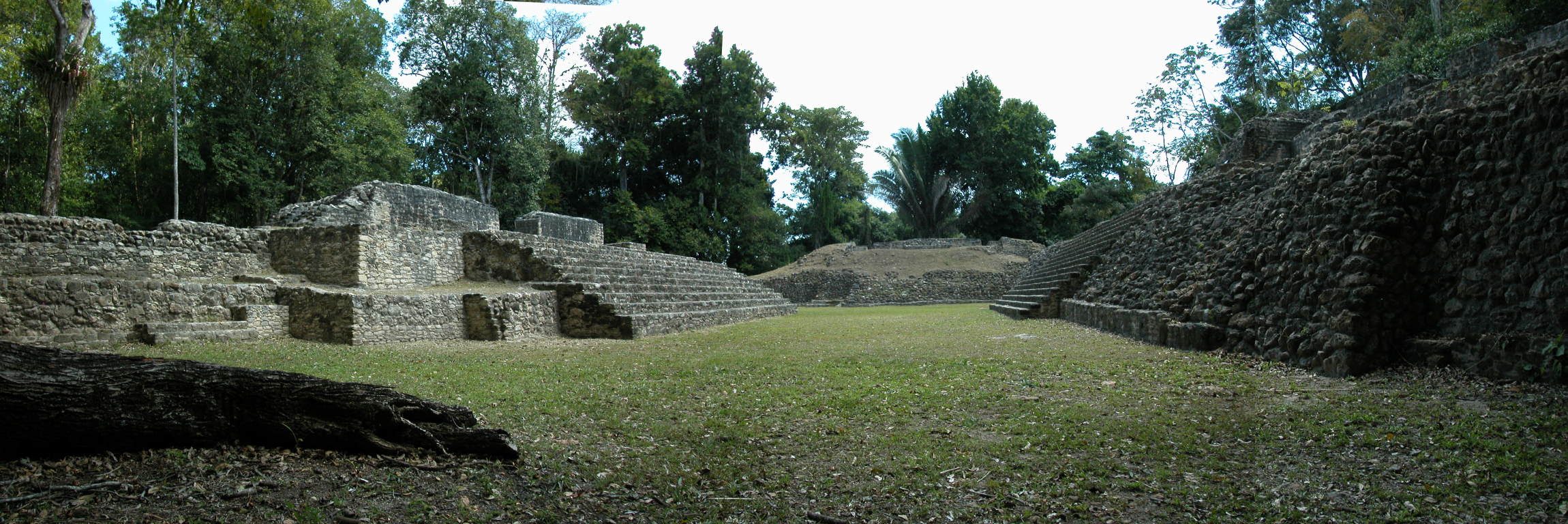
The southern acropolis

- 331–349: Teʼ Kʼab Chaak
- c. 470: Kʼahkʼ Ujol Kʼinich I
- 484–514: Yajaw Te' K'inich I
- 531–534: K'an I
- 553–593: Yajaw Te' K'inich II (Lord Water)
- 599–613: Knot Ajaw
- 618–658: K'an II
- 658–680: Kʼahkʼ Ujol Kʼinich II
- c. 700: Ruler VII
- mid 8th century: name unknown
- 793: Tum Yohl K'inich
- 798: K'inich Joy K'awiil
- 810–830: K'inich Toob'il Yoaat
- 835–849: K'an III
- 859: Ruler XIII

Te' K'ab Chaak (Tree Branch Rain God) is the dynastic progenitor of Caracol, yet is only known from two Late Classic back dated texts. One places him at AD 331, and the second at AD 349.

K'ahk' Ujol K'inich I (also known as Ruler I, or Smoking Skull I) appears on the 6th century genealogical text of Stela 16, but his place in the line of reigning lords is unknown. His reign has been estimated to be circa AD 470. He may have been the father of Yajaw Te' K'inich I.

Yajaw Te' K'inich I acceded to rulership in AD 484 (9.2.9.0.16), and is known from Stela 13, which records his celebration of the 4th K'atun in AD 514. His monuments include Stela 13 and Altar 4. He is the father of K'an I.

K'an I (also known as Ruler II) is the son of Yajaw Te' K'inich I, and acceded his father in AD 531 – 9.4.16.13.3. Stela 15 text gives his parentage statement, and tells that his accession was overseen by a higher authority, either another lord or a divine being. His monuments include Stela 16 (which includes his parentage statement) and Altar 14.

Yajaw Te' K'inich II (also known as Lord Water), son of K'an I and named after his grandfather, acceded to power in AD 553 - 9.5.19.1.2. His monuments include Stelae 1, 4(?), 14, and Altars 1, 6, and 24. His first monument, Stela 14, records the K'atun ending in AD 554 (9.6.0.0.0). As told on Altar 21, Yajaw Te' K'inich II's accession takes place under the auspices of the Tikal Lord Wak Chan K'awiil. He erected Stela 1 and Altar 1 to mark his last K'atun ending of 9.8.0.0.0, and four years later he is referenced as "seeing" the 9.8.10.0.0 ending. He is mentioned in the fragmentary text on Stela 23. In AD 562 – 9.6.8.4.2 he enacted the first recorded star war against Tikal and Lord Wak Chan K'awiil. h. Yajaw Te' K'inich II's two sons, Knot Ajaw and K'an II, rule after him.

Knot Ajaw, born in AD 575 (9.7.2.0.3), succeeded his father Yajaw Te' K'inich II in AD 599. Erected Stelae 5, 6, and 7 (?) to the west of Structure A13, as well as dedicated Altars 11(?) and 15. He was the half-brother of K'an II.

K'an II is described as the most successful Caracol ruler. Reigning for 40 years from AD 618 to 658, he expanded the causeway system and saw an increase in the site's population. Born as Sak Witzil Baah ("White First Hill", or "White Gopher Hill") in AD 588, he took his grandfather's name at his accession. He was the half-brother of Knot Ajaw, and was thus always stressing his legitimacy by referencing his mother (who may be Batz' Ek'). It is interesting that he never references the rule of his brother Knot Ajaw in any of his monuments, even those that describe his dynastic predecessors. He also seems to have developed diplomatic contacts with the Snake polity, with whom he coordinated the war with Naranjo, which began in 626, and ended with the defeat of Naranjo in 631. His monuments include Stelae 3, 22, Altars 2, 7, 17,19, and 21, and potentially the Hieroglyphic Stairway and Panel 1 from Naranjo.

K'ahk' Ujol K'inich II (also known as Smoking Skull II, or Ruler VI) succeeded K'an II in AD 658, but as he has no surviving parentage statements, we cannot be certain that he is K'an II's son. His only monument appears at La Rejolla, and only two stucco texts from Caana (Structures B16-sub and B18). One of these texts shows that in AD 680, Caracol was the victim of a star war from Naranjo (also called Naranjo's war of Independence). Martin and Grube suggest that this action drove K'ahk' Ujol K'inich from Caracol, at which time he may have fled to La Rejolla 12 km to the northwest. The remainder of this text has not been excavated. This star war event seems to have launched Caracol's epigraphic hiatus, which continues for 96 years, until AD 798.

Ruler VII reigned during the epigraphic hiatus, and erected only one stela (Stela 21) dated to AD 702 (9.13.10.0.0). One candidate for this ruler comes from Naj Tunich, some 46 km to the south. In one of the cave's chambers dated to AD 692 is a text referring to a Caracol elite named Tz'ayaj K'ajk', who carries the emblem glyph, but not the k'inich ajaw prefix.

Tum Yohl K'inich (also called Ruler VIII) is as enigmatic as Ruler VII. He likewise appears in the Naj Tunich, and also lacks the k'inich ajaw prefix, leaving his royal status in question. In this text, he performs a fire-bearing ritual under the supervision of a lord of Ixkun; an unnamed lord of Calakmul is also involved. All other appearances of his name occur in later retrospective texts like Altar 23, which lists him as a 3 K'atun lord, and the captor of two lords from Ucanal and Bital.

K'inich Joy K'awiil began a revival of the Caracol polity with his accession in AD 799 (9.18.9.5.9). He commissioned the B-Group Ballcourt, the markers of which date back to the dynastic founder Te' K'ab Chaak. Stela 11 shows Tum Yohl K'inich in an ambiguous relationship to Joy K'awiil, which may show that he is the latter's father, or as suggested by Altar 23 potentially a relative in a high-ranking military position.

K'inich Toobil Yopaat's (also known as Ruler X and XI) accession date is not certain, but he erected five (possibly six) monuments (**Stelae 18, 19, Altars 12, 13), and seems to have repaired relations with Ucanal. This new relationship is depicted on Altars 12 and 13, as well as on stucco text from Structure B18.

K'an III is little known, and he erected three monuments.

Ruler XIII is the last known lord of Caracol, and erected only one monument: Stela 10. Stela 10 is a carved all glyphic monument which may commemorate the half-K'atun 10.1.10.0.0 (AD 859).

== Select architectural groups ==
=== A-Group Plaza ===
- One of the earliest groups at the site. Has temples on three sides, and a western range platform supporting six structures; built over the earlier Uaxactun style E Group (completed by AD 70). Structures A1–A7 surround the plaza.
- Painted texts from elite tombs in Structure A3 and A34 (the Central Acropolis). Tombs from this complex date to earlier than the epigraphic record, and as such cannot be equated to epigraphically known individuals.
- 8th Cycle dedication caches placed, probably also timed with the completion/dedication of the E Group; this predates caching practices at other sites like Tikal by several hundred years.

==== Structure A1 ====
- Investigations encountered ritual activity in a traditionally non-ritual context at the back of the structure. Stela 1 and Altar 1 were located at the rear, in front of a tomb with three cremated individuals, and over a twice life-size stucco figure which created, modified, and used during the Early Classic. Also recovered were two elaborate caches dating to the end of the Early Classic, including a cached ceramic box found at the chest of the stucco figure.
- Construction dates to the Early classic. Probably played a role in the Lord Water (Yajaw Te' K'inich II), Knot Ahau, and K'an II transition. Occupation and modification demonstrated in the Late to Terminal Classic.
- Grouping of monuments includes Stelae 13, 14, 15, 16, and Altar 7. This building sequence seems to have begun with a dedicatory cache on the bedrock below Platform A1 containing Early Classic pottery, which was covered over by a floor in which Stelae 13 and 14 were set. A Late or Terminal Classic cache was placed directly above the first and Stelae 15 and 16 were broken and covered by Altar 7 in front of Stela 14 (this indicates that originally, Stela 14 and Altar 7 were not a pair; Altar 7 was a later addition).

==== Structure A2 ====
- Forming the western side of the A-Group Plaza, excavations revealed several Early Classic caches and a Terminal Classic tomb. Stela 22 which was found 1.5m west of Altar 17, and Stela 23 were also found at its summit.
- Excavations revealed that the structure was built in one single construction effort during the Late Preclassic with only minor later modification.

==== Structure A3 ====
- Located on the northern side of the A-Group Plaza
- Painted capstone shows building renovation in AD 696
- Excavations uncovered a well preserved front stairway with the basal portion of a central stair mask. Two special deposits (a Terminal Classic skull cache and a Late Classic partial burial) were found in association with the stair, but neither revealed any artifactual offerings. The mask here was also not associated with a tomb, as is the case with B19 and B20 on Caana.

==== Structure A5 ====
- Stelae 13, 14, 15, 16, and Altar 7 were found adjacent, and Stelae 12 and 20 were found at its base.
- No tombs were located within its core,

==== Structure A6 ====
- The largest of the four buildings surrounding A-Group Plaza, and dates to the 1st century AD. Two tombs were located in front of the structure, and were both of an Early Classic date, although no tombs were found within the core of the building.
- The primary eastern temple in the A-Group
- Appears to have been the location of long term use, evidenced from cooking vessels and burning dated into the 11th century AD.

==== Structure A8 ====
- The superstructure, excavated during the 1990 field season, revealed a tandem-room structure facing south, away from the A Plaza. Excavations revealed that the earlier platform faced west, and a probe in the plaza floor showed a posthole, although it is unknown if it is associated with the platform or an earlier construction.

==== Structure A10 ====
- Defines the northern boundary of the A-Group Ballcourt (Structures A11 and A12). Its earliest construction associated with the earliest floor indicated a Late Preclassic date. The latest material recovered from the floor of the structure is Late to Terminal Classic effigy censors, indicating a long use history.

==== A-Group Ballcourt (structures A11 and A12) ====
- Altar 21 centrally placed within the ballcourt

==== Structure A13 ====
- Associated with Stelae 5, 6, and 7 which originally sat in a line at western front of the structure.
- It was obviously a place of dynastic ritual and potentially accession, as it has 3 stelae along its base. A purposely burned cache was found within the structure, and probably dated to the onset of the Late Classic.
- Three small platforms, and no formally constructed buildings, surmounted this structure in its final form and the structure itself seems to date to the early Late Classic.

=== B-Group Plaza ===
==== Caana (B14–B20, B36, B37) ====
- Caana ('sky-palace') is the largest building at Caracol. It remains one of the largest man-made structures in Belize. It is situated on the north end of the B-Group Plaza.
- Rebuilt by Lord Water, and tombs were placed in B20 at AD 577Modified and inhabited during the Classic and Terminal Classic.
- Major constructions date to the Late 7th century (AD 650–696)
- In total it had minimally 71 rooms and at least 45 benches.

===== Structure B18 =====
- One of the latest constructions on Caana's summit, it was remodeled by K'inich Toobil Yopaat in the first half of the 9th century, and include stucco references to Papmalil of Ucanal.
- Its latest construction raised the final floor 4m above the previous floor construction. Its rooms resembled a palace structure rather than the expected temple, which is further supported by the lack of axial caches.

===== Structure B19 =====
- One of the most important structures at Caracol, and the tallest. The large tomb of an elite woman was excavated in 1987; several additional tombs have been found in subsequent excavations. Two reentered tombs under the side rooms indicate continued use of the structure into the Late Classic (past AD 700).
- It was originally constructed at the end of the Late Preclassic, and only in the Late Classic was its height raised.
- Painted texts from elite tombs in structures B19 and B20. Earliest known hieroglyphic text associated with a tomb – Structure B20, dates to AD 537. One has a painted date that seems to be 9.10.1.12.11 (AD 634), and Martin and Grube suggest that it is Lady Batz' Ek'
- At the foot of the steps to B19 is a giant ajaw altar dedicated to the Bak'tun ending 10.0.0.0.0 7 Ajaw (AD 830).

==== Structures B8 and B9 ====
- Together they create the B-Group Ballcourt
- A centerline east-west trench was paced in 1986, demonstrating that the court was built in a single construction
- Its markers include BCMs 2, 3, and 4 (see monument list)

==== Barrio (B21–B26) ====
- It was undergoing major renovations at the time of abandonment. It is a palace compound which consists of a series of vaulted structures on a raised platform to the east of Caana and the B Plaza.
- Substantial deposits of Terminal Classic ceramics were found between Structures B25 and B26. Excavations into the structure's core indicate a Late Classic construction with Terminal Classic modification.

===== Structure B21 =====
- Forms the eastern portion of the Barrio complex, and was originally mapped by Satterthwaite. It is an eight-room tandem plan building, and the two rooms facing the courtyard each have benches, but no associated deposits or caches.

===== Structure B25 =====
- Dominating the eastern edge of the plaza, whose western stair seems to have been remodeled, although there was little evidence of previous construction efforts. Several of its rooms yielded ceramic vessels, burnt surfaces, beads, and benches.

===== Structure B26 =====
- The tallest building within the Barrio complex, and dominates the northern side of the courtyard. Excavations revealed that the building was never finished, as it was being enlarged at the time of abandonment.

==== Structure B28 ====
- It is the eastern building on the B Plaza, and is associated with the Terminal Classic Stela 18 and Altar 23. Excavations during the 2002 season revealed that this building was primarily constructed during the latter part of the Late Classic.
- Extensive disarticulated human remains were found to the front of the building's steps, some of which seems to have been burnt along with the associated floor. These remains date to the Terminal Classic, and represent the remains of 2 to 17 individuals. These bones were directly associated with the fragmented Stela 25, which is suspected to have tumbled down from B28's summit.

==== Northeast Acropolis (B30–B34) ====
- Directly to the east of Caana, on the north side of a plaza created by Caana to the west and the Barrio palace complex to the east. This structure group atop a large raised platform was occupied from the Late Preclassic through the Terminal Classic, with extensive modification in the later period. The only definite access point is on the western side (presumably with a similar stair on the eastern side) which would have created an intensely restricted plaza space.
- Massive construction during the Late to Terminal Classic raised the plaza over 2m
- A test pit was placed in the center of the plaza revealing an Early Classic cremation dating to AD 330 (S.D. C117F-1) which was recovered from a sealed deposit within the central plaza. Twenty ceramic vessels were recovered in various conditions, many being severely burnt, three of which are reminiscent of Teotihuacan style vessels. Six tanged points were recovered warped from the intensity of the fire, along with many other elite goods. A minimum of three individuals were present, although the bones were too badly burnt to identify sex or age.

===== Structure B30 =====
- One of two range structures that mark the southern edge of the Acropolis (along with Structure B31). There was no access point to the Acropolis between these two structures.

===== Structure B31 =====
- As paired with B30, probably contained two inset terraced area, yet their function is unknown. There is evidence of a small stairway to the west of this structure which grants access to the Acropolis.

===== Structure B32 =====
- A range structure (probably consisting of two levels originally) situated on the western edge of the Acropolis plaza. Evidence of extensive burning was found on either side of the stairway which extended into the plaza, as well as along both sides of the terrace facings. While dirt fill contained Late Preclassic through Terminal Classic refuse, there was only one Terminal Classic construction effort.

===== Structure B33 =====
- The largest construction on the Northeast Acropolis. Containing 8 rooms, there were no vaulted stones recovered, indicating a wooden/perishable roofing structure. An Early Classic tomb (S.D. C181B-1) was found beneath the summit floor containing one adult individual with head to the east. Evidence of Terminal Classic modification and expansion may be contemporaneous with the raising of the plaza. A test-pit in front of the structure recovered a Late Preclassic cache

===== Structure B34 =====
- The eastern shrine of the complex, was excavated and deposits show a long history, ranging from the Late Preclassic through the Terminal Classic. Several special deposits dating to the Late Classic were found; no late dating royal tombs were recovered (unlike Caana and the Central Acropolis)

=== C-Group Plaza ===
- Includes the plaza created by structures B59–B62, B64, and I19–I20. This plaza and the majority of its associated structures date largely to the Late Preclassic based on construction sequencing and mortuary activity.

==== Structure B59 ====
- A square collapsed stone structure on the northeast corner of the C-Group Plaza; it was selected for excavation based on its potential as a shrine. It was completely infilled with raised benches, and resembles a sweat house except for the missing firebox, which would have been set to the rear of the structure.

==== Structure I20 ====
- Sits atop the eastern end of I19, a long range building making up the northern edge of the plaza group. Built in multiple phases all dating to the Late Classic, it had two distinct buildings. Excavations revealed used into the Terminal Classic, and several caches and burials were also uncovered.

==== Culebras residential group ====
- Located southeast of the South Acropolis, on the eastern side of the Pajaro-Romonal Causeway. Set within a terraced hillside, and was investigated during the 2008–2009 field seasons.

==== Structure C20 ====
- The northernmost of the plaza group's two eastern shrines. It contained a Late Classic tomb (S.D. C179B-7) with a narrow stairway created for reentry; this entry way was sealed during the latest construction effort. This entry was used to deposit a total of seven individuals into the tomb. A concentration of smashed ceramic sherds was found directly over the tomb's axis. The items interred with these individuals indicated access to a variety of prestige goods and tradewares from outside Caracol.

=== South Acropolis ===
- This area was flourishing at the end of the Late Preclassic, and was an area for ritual as evidenced by recovered incensarios. Moving into the Early Classic, it seems to have functioned as an elite residence.

==== Structure D4 ====
- This structure formed the formal entrance way to the South Acropolis. Heavily burnt fragmentary human remains were uncovered in an excavation of a previous looter's trench.

==== Structure D5 ====
- It is the westernmost of the three small platforms that make up the southern side of the South Acropolis. A line-of-stone building overlaid an earlier eastern facing construction dating to the Late Classic, which in turn overlaid a Preclassic floor.

==== Structure D7 ====
- This mortuary structure dominates the eastern side of the main interior plaza, and has three substructures. A tomb was found on the western slope which included nine vessels (all of Early Classic date), several Charlie Chaplins, and four limestone bars.

==== Structure D9 ====
- This structure is the eastern building of the South Acropolis plaza formed by Structures D7, D11, D16, and three small southern platforms. Excavations encountered at least two prior constructions, and the final construction dates to the Late and Terminal Classic.
- A crypt was placed in the front of the final construction, containing two adults and several vessels dating to the Late to Terminal Classic. A crude cist was carved out in front of the lower step of an earlier building phase.

==== Structure D11 ====
- A large building which forms the western limit of the southeast plaza, and the eastern limit of the southwest plaza of the South Acropolis. It primarily faces the southeast plaza, and probably dates to the Late Classic based on limited ceramics.

==== Structure D12 ====
- Defines the south side of the southwest plaza of the South Acropolis.

==== Structure D14 ====
- Exists at the western end of the main South Acropolis plaza.

==== Structure D16 ====
- This structure surmounts the large raised platform that makes us the southern side of the main plaza, and is paired with D17 and D18.
- An excavated burial containing two individuals dating to AD 500.

==== Structure D17 ====
- Several tombs were found by A. H. Anderson during his early excavations, and include several ceramic vessels of a Late Classic date.

==== Structure D18 ====
- It is the central structure on the platform, and much of it was presumably removed by A. H. Anderson who also seems to have encountered several tombs.

=== Structure F2 (Northwest Group) ===
- It is the eastern building of the Northwest Group, and was severely looted prior to 1985. Two secondary burials were found in the core, and two cist burials were located in the plaza directly in front of the structure.
- Painted stucco decoration was found in the western collapse of the building, and two earlier versions of the structure were also encountered.

=== Alta/Baja Vista residential complex ===
- Situated immediately west of the Northwest Group (Structures F1–F4), and includes Structures F30–F42, and was selected for its occupation by Caracol's secondary elite. 28 special deposits were uncovered during excavations. Excavations revealed a long history of occupation, dating from the Late Preclassic to the Terminal Classic.

==== Structure F33 ====
- One of the tallest residential constructions at Caracol, and the tallest building at the Baja/Alta Vista complex. It yielded a large number of Late Classic ritual deposits (3 burials and 12 caches), indicating its importance to the complex.
- Sequencing indicates that this structure was first utilized as a ritual location for Late Preclassic to Early Classic caching practices, and for Late Classic burials.

==== Structure F36 ====
- On the northern side of the Baja Vista plaza, it had a facing that was evident before excavation. At least two earlier version of the structure were evidenced, yet no deposits were recovered from beneath the building itself. Several burials and caches were recovered from the plaza directly in front of the structure. From ceramic materials it is possible to date the latest version of the structure to the Late Classic.

==== Structure F39 ====
- The larger of two eastern buildings of Baja Vista and at least four different versions of the building are evident. Two earlier shrines were discovered, and the earlier of the two (S.D. C184B-4) contained a large quantity of ritual ceramics and bone. This earlier shrine was also directly behind a burial (S.D. C184B-7), and directly above a second burial (S.D. C184B-6). In total, three burials, three caches, and a shrine deposit were uncovered, and the majority of these materials date to the Late Classic, one burial dates to the Terminal Classic.

==== Structure F41 ====
- Located on the southern side of the Baja Vista plaza, this structure is the central building of three low structures. It was shown to be a bi-level building with a northern frontal stoop. Materials were limited, but indicated a Terminal Classic occupation date.

=== Saraguate ===
- Located in the west-central portion of Map Quad 3I, and is 350m east of the South Causeway and was explored during the 1997 field season. One of the largest architectural complexes in the southeast sector and situated within terraces along a small hill that extends west to the South Causeway.
- Extensive looting had cut through at least one tomb, three eastern and one northern building. The backfill from this tomb yielded a Preclassic vessel; further excavations revealed a Late Classic tomb with a single female individual.
- The largest structure is the central east building and also showed extensive looting. Within the looter's trench were the remains of 3 adults and a partial Early Classic vessel. A two-room tomb was found beneath the stairway, and although looted still revealed four individuals and three Late Classic vessels along with other smaller artifacts. A single Late Classic face cache was found in front of the lower step of the building.
- These excavations indicate occupation dating from the Late Preclassic to at least the Late Classic

=== Retiro ===
- Terminus discovered during the 1991 field season, at which time a large number of looted tombs were also salvaged. The Causeway terminates into a large administrative plaza bordered by low range structures. A second plaza set at the foot of a hill connects is connected by a 30m wide causeway, and contains large pyramids, plain stelae and altars. At the hill's summit, there is a series of elite plaza groups accessed by a causeway stairway. Salvage work was conducted on the southern building of this group, revealing a tomb which had been decorated with red-line painting.
- These constructions date from the Early and Late Classic.

=== Ceiba ===
- Also located during the 1991 field season, the causeway runs past a still functional reservoir, and the terminus is situated on a high hill. Made up of a small group of range buildings, the main plaza area probably served an administrative function. To the south of this group is a larger plaza with sizable pyramids; to the north is an acropolis group. A causeway continues past this terminus and the Guatemalan border, eventually ending at the La Rejolla terminus
- Excavation and salvage work done at this terminus indicated primarily Late Classic dates. The Pescador group to the north also yielded Protoclassic and Preclassic ceramics.

== Other area sites ==
Other Maya sites within the Cayo district include Xunantunich, Cahal Pech, and Chaa Creek.

== See also ==
- List of Mesoamerican pyramids
