= Yajaw Teʼ Kʼinich II =

King of Caracol in Belize

- Ajaw
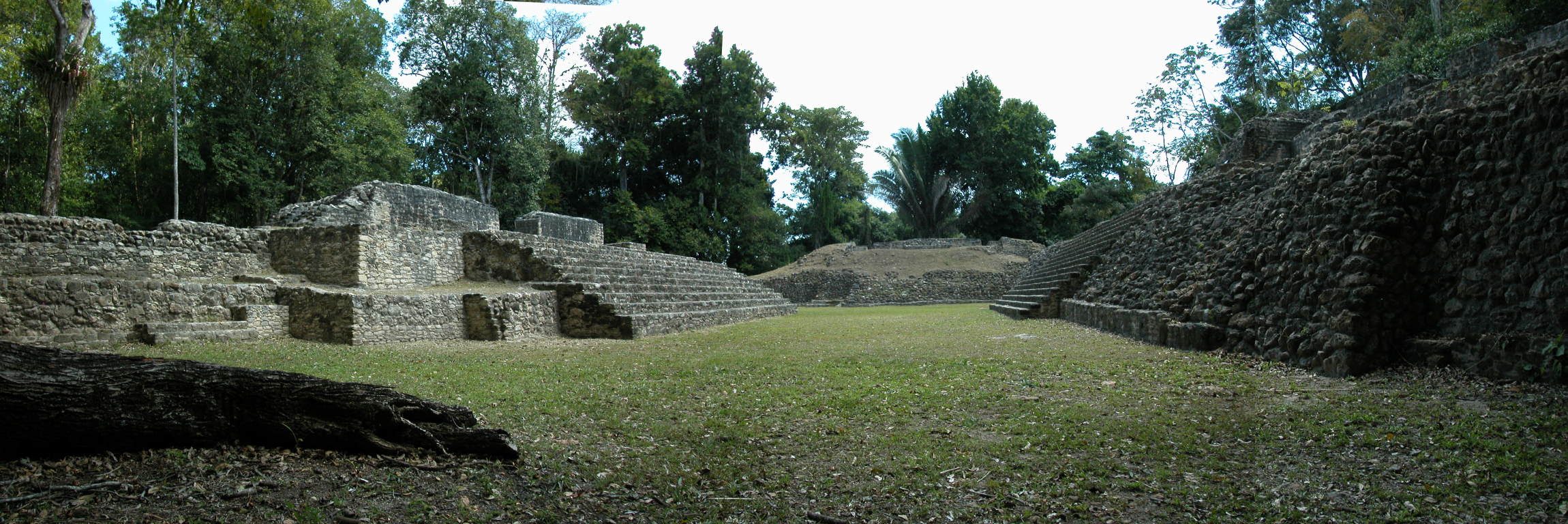
- Ruins at Caracol, city of Yajaw Teʼ Kʼinich II

King of Caracol
- Reign: 18 April 553 – 593>
- Predecessor: Kʼan I
- Successor: Knot Ajaw
- Spouse: Lady 1 Lady Batzʼ Ekʼ
- Issue: Knot Ajaw; Kʼan II
- Father: King Kʼan I
- Mother: Lady Kʼal Kʼinich
- Religion: Maya religion

Yajaw Teʼ Kʼinich II was a king of the Mayan state Caracol in Belize. He was also known as Ruler III, Lord Water and Lord Muluc and reigned AD 553-593.

== Biography ==
Yajaw Teʼ Kʼinich II was a son of the king Kʼan I. His mother was Lady Kʼal Kʼinich. He was named after his paternal grandfather, Yajaw Teʼ Kʼinich I, who was a son of Kʼahkʼ Ujol Kʼinich I.

The reign of Yajaw Teʼ Kʼinich II was pivotal in Caracol history; it began in turmoil, as Caracol exchanged one overlord for another, and ended in prosperity, as the city began to grow into a true metropolis.

This ruler's own Stela 14 makes no mention of the fact that his accession took place under the auspices of Tikal; this is only known from Altar 21. Regrettably Altar 21 is now broken into fragments, and most of this key passage does not survive.

The fragmentary Stela 4, a text probably dating to 583, shows Caracol tied to Calakmul some two decades after the victory over Tikal, as an action of Yajaw Teʼ Kʼinich is said to have been supervised by the Calakmul ruler.

His wives were Lady 1 and Lady Batzʼ Ekʼ and his sons were Knot Ajaw and Kʼan II.
