= Kʼan I =

- Ajaw

King of Caracol
- Reign: 13 April 531 - c.534
- Predecessor: Yajaw Teʼ Kʼinich I
- Successor: Yajaw Teʼ Kʼinich II
- Consort: Lady Kʼal Kʼinich
- Issue: Yajaw Teʼ Kʼinich II; Chekaj K'inich
- Father: Yajaw Teʼ Kʼinich I
- Mother: Wife of Yajaw Teʼ Kʼinich I
- Religion: Maya religion

Kʼan I (also known as Ruler II, Lord Jaguar and Antenna Top I) was a Maya king of Caracol in Belize. He reigned AD 531-534.

== Biography ==
Kʼan was a son of the king Yajaw Teʼ Kʼinich I, who was maybe a son of Kʼahkʼ Ujol Kʼinich I and Lady of Xultun.

His monuments are Stela 16 and Altar 14.

Because it was carved in slate rather than limestone, Stela 15 survives only in fragments, but it seems to record this ruler's accession and states that it took place under the auspices of a higher authority; because so little of the text can be read, it is not known whether this was a superordinate political power or a god. The inscription also mentions an attack against Oxwitzaʼ ("Three Hill Water"), as Caracol was anciently known, and refers to lords from Caracol and Tikal; it is by no means certain, however, that these events happened during the reign of Kʼan.

With his wife Lady Kʼal Kʼinich, K'an I spawned his son and eventual successor, Yajaw Teʼ Kʼinich II, who himself fathered King Knot Ajaw.

== Bibliography ==
- Chronicle of the Maya Kings and Queens by Simon Martin and Nikolai Grube
