= Teʼ Kʼab Chaak =

- Ajaw

King of Caracol
- Reign: 331–349
- Predecessor: None
- Successor: K'ahk' Ujol K'inich I (next known ruler)
- Died: Caracol
- Religion: Maya religion

Teʼ Kʼab Chaak ("Tree Branch Rain God") was a Mayan king (ajaw) of Caracol in Belize. He was a founder of the Caracol dynasty, becoming king in 331.

Two retrospective references to Teʼ Kʼab Chaak in Late Classic texts place him in the middle of the fourth century AD; that a king from this early era should continue to be talked about hundreds of years later suggests that he was the dynasty founder.

Marc Zender cautions that the translation of Teʼ Kʼab Chaak's name as "Tree Branch Rain God" is unlikely, given that kʼabte' (literally "arm [of] tree"), rather than teʼkʼab, would be the expected order of elements in Mayan for the meaning "tree branch".

Zender suggests a translation like "Tree-Armed Chaak" or "Trees are the Arms of Chaak".

It was announced in July 2025 that the tomb of Teʼ Kʼab Chaak had been found by archaeologists from the University of Houston in the Northeast Acropolis of Caracol. Located underneath an existing burial chamber, the tomb was covered with cinnabar and contained ceramic vessels, carved bone tubes, a mosaic death mask, and jadeite jewellery. From an examination of Teʼ Kʼab Chaak's skeleton, it was estimated that he was approximately five foot seven inches tall and was old when he died, having lost all of his teeth.
