= Kʼahkʼ Ujol Kʼinich I =

King of Maya city of Caracol in Belize

- Ajaw

King of Caracol
- Reign: c.470
- Predecessor: Teʼ Kʼab Chaak (previous known ruler)
- Successor: Yajaw Teʼ Kʼinich I
- Spouse: Lady of Xultun
- Issue: Yajaw Teʼ Kʼinich I
- Religion: Maya religion

Kʼahkʼ Ujol Kʼinich I ("Fire-headed Sun God") was a king of Maya city of Caracol in Belize, named after the Sun deity called Kinich Ahau. He is also known as Ruler I and Smoking Skull I. He reigned c. AD 470.

His wife was probably Lady of Xultun and his son was likely king Yajaw Teʼ Kʼinich I.

This ruler is named retrospectively in a sixth-century genealogy, but his exact position in the chronology of Caracol rulers is uncertain. His status as a revered ancestor is inferred from the fact that his name appears on a later monument as a belt ornament. On Caracol Stela 6 Kʼahkʼ Ujol Kʼinich's descendant Knot Ajaw is depicted with the head of Kʼahkʼ Ujol Kʼinich.
