= Xultun =

Maya archaeological site

Coordinates: 17.5°N 89.4°W

Xultún is a large Maya archaeological site located 40 km northeast of Tikal and 8 km south of the smaller Preclassic site of San Bartolo in northern Guatemala.

== Site ==
The site, which once supported a considerable population, has a 35 m tall pyramid, two ballcourts, 24 stelae (the last of which, Stele 10, dates to 889), several plazas, and five large water reservoirs (aguadas). Incompletely charted in the 1970s, it is the largest-known Classic Maya site that has yet to be archaeologically investigated. Nearby sites include Chaj K’e’k Cué, believed to be the residential area of the Xultún elite; Isla Oasis; and Las Minas. The latter sites contain large limestone quarries.

Proyecto Regional Arqueológico San Bartolo-Xultun (English: San Bartolo-Xultun Regional Archaeological Project) (PRASBX) has been investigating this site and the nearby site of San Bartolo since 2001. The project currently (as of 2022) operates under the directorship of Dr. Heather Hurst and Boris Beltrán.

== Recent discoveries ==
Since 2008, excavations in Xultun have revealed several unusual features.

=== Three Astrologers ===
One of the unusual features is a Late-Classic room (labeled 10K2) with murals on three sides, showing three dark seated characters with large mitres signalling their priestly function (west wall); a kneeling official extending a stylus to the seated king, Yax We'nel Chan K'inich (north wall); and three other characters, together with unique Maya calendar notations chiefly relating to lunar astrology (northeast and east walls). Most of the characters bear hieroglyphic titles, some of these reminiscent of the senior-junior rankings of the traditionalist Maya civil-religious hierarchy. The lunar notations strongly recall much later calculations found in the Dresden Codex.

=== Temple of the Royal Jaguar Cult ===
Another important feature, described by William Saturno in a 2014 presentation, is a building complex called 'Los Árboles', dating to the Early Classic. Its front is decorated with complicated stucco imagery relating to the royal cult of the jaguar, also in evidence on several of the site's stelas. This cult was apparently associated with the dismemberment (imagined or real) of human victims. At the same time, there is a double reference to a place of origins (7 k'an - 9 imix), with the numbers personified by their respective jaguar-related patrons.

=== Sweatbath Goddess ===
In 2012, an Early-Classic sweatbath nicknamed 'Los Sapos' (The Toads) was excavated, a part of a residential complex (Structure 12F-5). Around a small door in its northern facade, a stucco decoration in low relief was laid free of a crouching female person showing amphibian or reptilian hands and feet, and with amphibians, possibly toads, contained within the arms and legs. The head, originally over the door, was missing, so that the age and human aspect of the amphibian woman could not be verified. Nonetheless, she has been suggested to represent the aged midwife goddess, Ix Chel.

=== Structure 10K-2 ===
The Structure 10K-2 was found in 2010, and was tentatively identified as a codex book writers' workshop. About 52 texts were found on the four walls, which researchers called the "rough drafts" of Maya mathematicians "as they charted and predicted the cycles of celestial objects relative to earth and to one another, and also worked to numerically reconcile such cycles with the other time units from various calendars", and include "a lunar table, a ring number and texts with nested cycles tied to local calculations; several grapple with very large units of time".

==== Identification of Sak Tahn Waax ====
Excavations at Xultún revealed the only documented case in which the name of a Maya mathematician and astronomer has been deciphered. The individual, Sak Tahn Waax (whose name translates to “White-chested Fox), is considered the first Classical Maya mathematician/astronomer identified by name. On the wall of the Structure 10K-2 there was identifies a calendaric formula signed by Sak Tahn Waax, dubbed Text 19 by the researchers:

Text 19 presents a sequence of dates with calendrical intervals as a mathematical exercise associated with idealised numbers. Its nested cycles encode several well-known calendrical and astronomical intervals observed by the Classic Maya, including cycles related to the movement of Venus and Mars; yet these are internally arranged in a novel and otherwise previously unattested way. [...] the scribe who created Text 19 was interested in how the 2920-day cycle could be parcelled into time intervals other than the five synodic periods of Venus (584 days) that generated it. The text engages six other time cycles embedded within the full count, these being (from smallest to largest): Uinal of 20 days; Tzolkin of 260 days; Tun of 360 days; Haab (solar year) of 365 days; Venus year of 584 days; Mars year of 780 days.

== History ==
Up to now (2017), the dynastical history of the important kingdom of Xultun - which has its own emblem glyph - is not well known and can only very partially be reconstructed from information on the site's heavily eroded stelas and from the inscriptions of other kingdoms with which it interacted, such as Caracol, Tikal and Naranjo. A fuller picture is nonetheless possible by taking into account data from the archaeology of the wider Xultun - San Bartolo habitational area. The kingdom's Classic importance is reflected by its role as a center of refined painting 'schools'.

== Bibliography ==
- Clarke, Mary (March 2013). A Preliminary Iconographic Analysis of a Possible Early Classic-Period Sweatbath at the Maya Site of Xultun (PDF) (Bachelor of Fine Arts thesis). Savannah, Georgia: Savannah College of Art and Design. Archived from the original (PDF) on July 11, 2022..
- Garrison, Thomas G., and David Stuart, "Un análisis preliminar de las inscripciones que se relacionan con Xultun, Petén, Guatemala." In XVII Simposio de Investigaciones Arqueológicas en Guatemala, 2003: 851–862.
- Garrison, Thomas G., and Nicholas P. Dunning, "Settlement, Environment, and Politics in the San Bartolo - Xultun Territory, El Petén, Guatemala." Latin American Antiquity 20(4), 2009: 525–552.
- Krempel, Guido, and Sebastian Matteo, "Painting styles of the north-eastern Petén from a local perspective: The palace schools of Yax We'en Chan K'inich, Lord of Xultun." [Krakow] Contributions in New World Archeology 3 (2012): 135–172.
- Prager, Christian, Wagner E., Matteo S. et al., "A Reading for the Xultun Toponymic Title as B'aax (Tuun) Witz 'Ajaw «Lord of the B'aax-(Stone) Hill»". Mexicon Vol. XXXII Nr. 4 (2010):74-77.
- Rossi, Franco, David Stuart, and William Saturno, "Una Exploración Epigráfica del Sitio Xultún." XXVIII Simposio de Investigaciones Arqueológicas en Guatemala, 2014, editado por B. Arroyo, L. Méndes Salinas, L. Paiz. Guatemala: Ministerio de Cultura y Deportes, IDAEH, and Asociación Tikal, 2015:663—674.
- Saturno, William (30 de enero de 2014). «Sembrando la raíz de la dinastía: conjunto los Árboles, Xultun, Guatemala». (video) Guatemala: Universidad Francisco Marroquín.
- Saturno, William, Franco Rossi, David Stuart, and Heather Hurst, "A Maya curia regis: Evidence for a hierarchical specialist order at Xultun, Guatemala". Ancient Mesoamerica 2017: 1-18.
- Zender, Marc, and Joel Skidmore, "Unearthing the Heavens: Classic Maya Murals and Astronomical Tables at Xultun, Guatemala". 2012 Mesoweb: www.mesoweb.com/reports/Xultun.html.
