= Knot Ajaw =

Knot Ajaw/Knot Ahaw
- Ajaw

King of Caracol
- Reign: 24 June 599 – 613
- Predecessor: Yajaw Te' K'inich II
- Successor: K'an II
- Born: 28 November 575; Caracol
- Died: 613 (aged 37–38); Caracol
- Father: King Yajaw Te' K'inich II
- Mother: Lady 1 of Caracol
- Religion: Maya religion

Knot Ajaw was king of the Maya city-state Caracol in Belize from 599 to 613 A.D., and is also known as Ruler IV, Ahaw Serpent and Flaming Ahaw. Ajaw (Ahaw) means "king" or "ruler" in Mayan. Knot Ajaw succeeded his father Yajaw Te' K'inich II as king.

== Biography ==
=== Birth and family ===
Knot Ajaw (also known as "Saak Ti' Huun") was the eldest son of King Yajaw Te' K'inich II, born on November 28, 575 to Lady 1 of Caracol and the king. Grandparents of Knot Ajaw were K'an I and Lady K'al K'inich (named after the Sun god). Knot Ajaw's stepmother was Lady Batz' Ek' and his half-brother was K'an II.

=== Reign ===
He acceded on June 24, 599. He may have co-ruled during the last years of his father.

Stela 6 accords a full emblem glyph to a lord named Chekaj K'inich, who is referred to as a "younger brother", presumably of Yajaw Te' K'inich; this suggests that he may have acted as a sort of "guardian uncle" to Knot Ajaw.

His successor was his younger brother.
