= Eight Skull =

- Ajaw
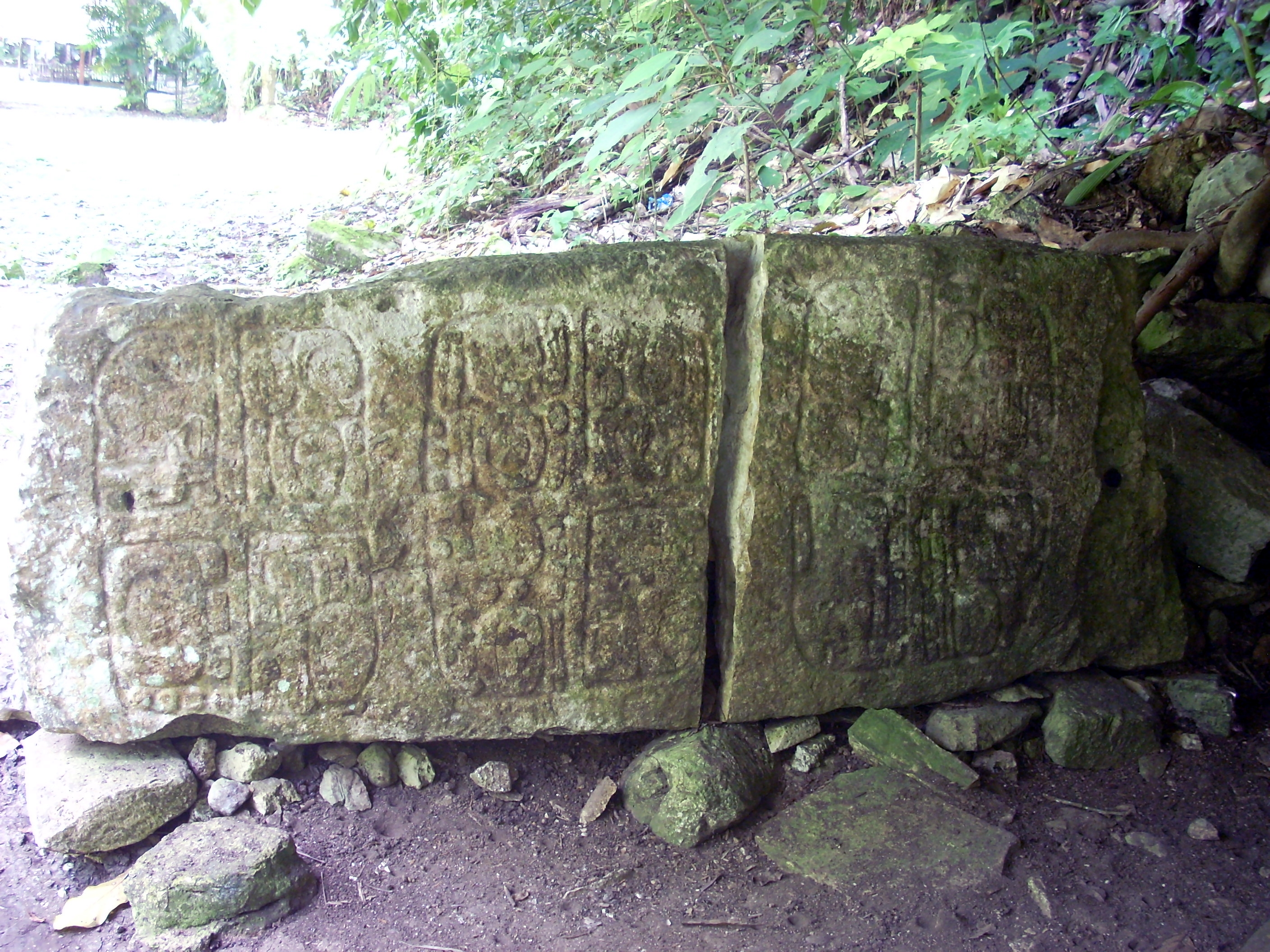
- Stela 12 was possibly dedicated by Eight Skull.

King of Ixkun
- Reign: c.779-790
- Successor: Rabbit God K
- Born: Ixkun
- Died: c.790 Ixkun
- Spouse: Lady Ik (possibly)
- Issue: Rabbit God K (possibly)
- Religion: Maya religion

Eight Skull (ruled ? - c. 790) was one of two known rulers of Ixkun, Mayan city. His successor was Rabbit God K.

Stela 2 records two battles, one against Sacul on 21 December 779 and the other against Ucanal on 10 May 780. It is said on the stela that Eight Skull was a predecessor of Rabbit God K. The text is incomplete.

Stela 12 is believed to have been dedicated by Eight Skull.
