= Rabbit God K =

Yukuul Kan Ahk
- Ajaw
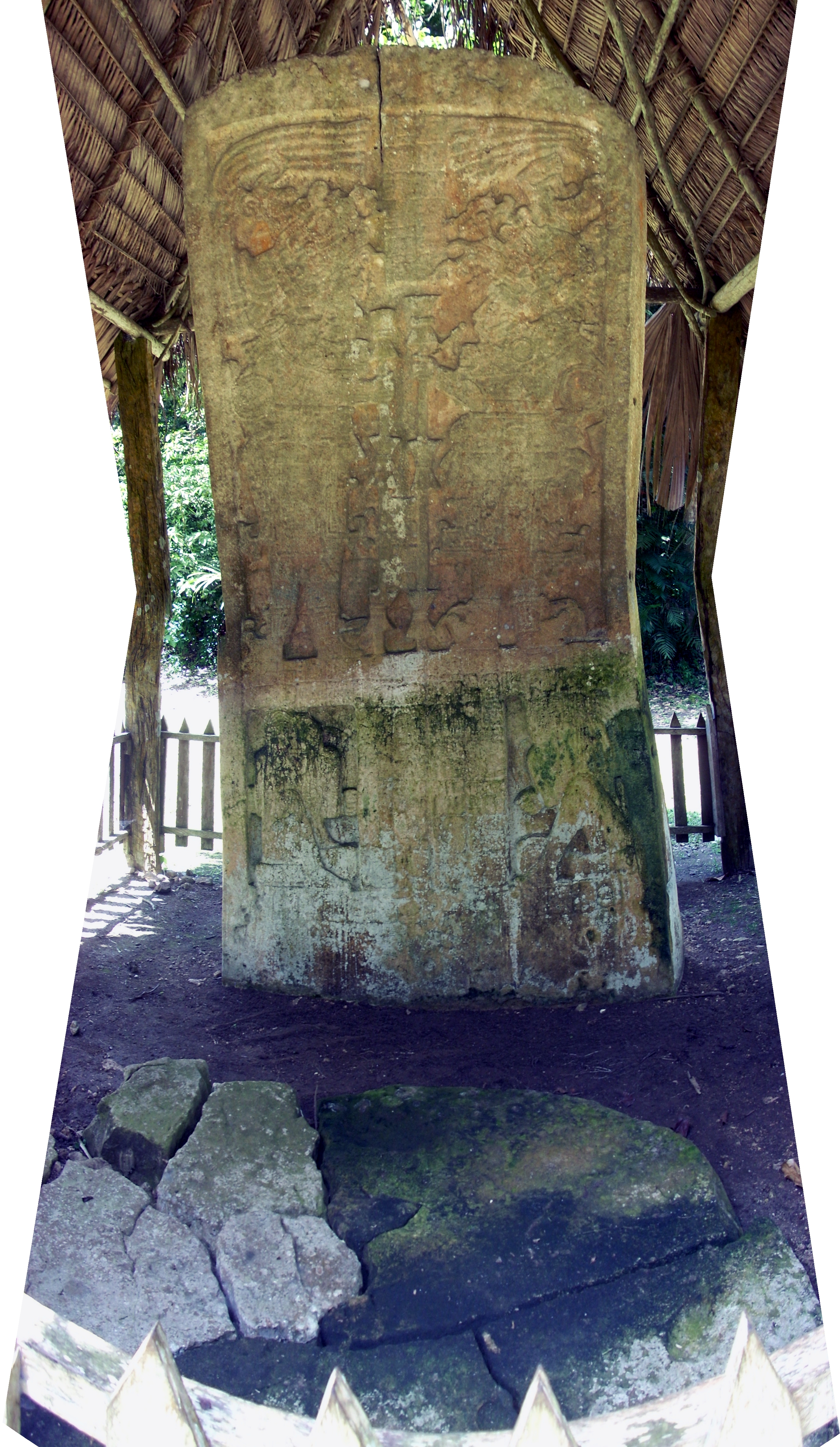
- The monarch's depiction in Stela 1, together with king Ch'iyel of Sacul, from whom he received a visit on 11 October 790.

King of Ixkun
- Reign: c.790-800
- Predecessor: Eight Skull
- Born: Ixkun
- Died: c.800 Ixkun
- Father: Eight Skull (possibly)
- Mother: Lady Ik
- Religion: Maya religion

Yukuul Chan/Kan Ahk, before called like Rabbit God K was one of two known rulers of Ixkun, Mayan city. He was a successor of Eight Skull. His mother was Lady Ik.

Stelae record the visit of K'iyel Janab', king of Sacul, to Ixkun on 11 October 790, when Rabbit God K ruled.

Around AD 800 Yukuul Kan Ahk erected the last sculpted monument at the city and was preparing new construction projects, with construction material piled ready for use in various places in the site core, however these projects were never finished.
