= Chʼiyel =

Ch'iyel
- Ajaw
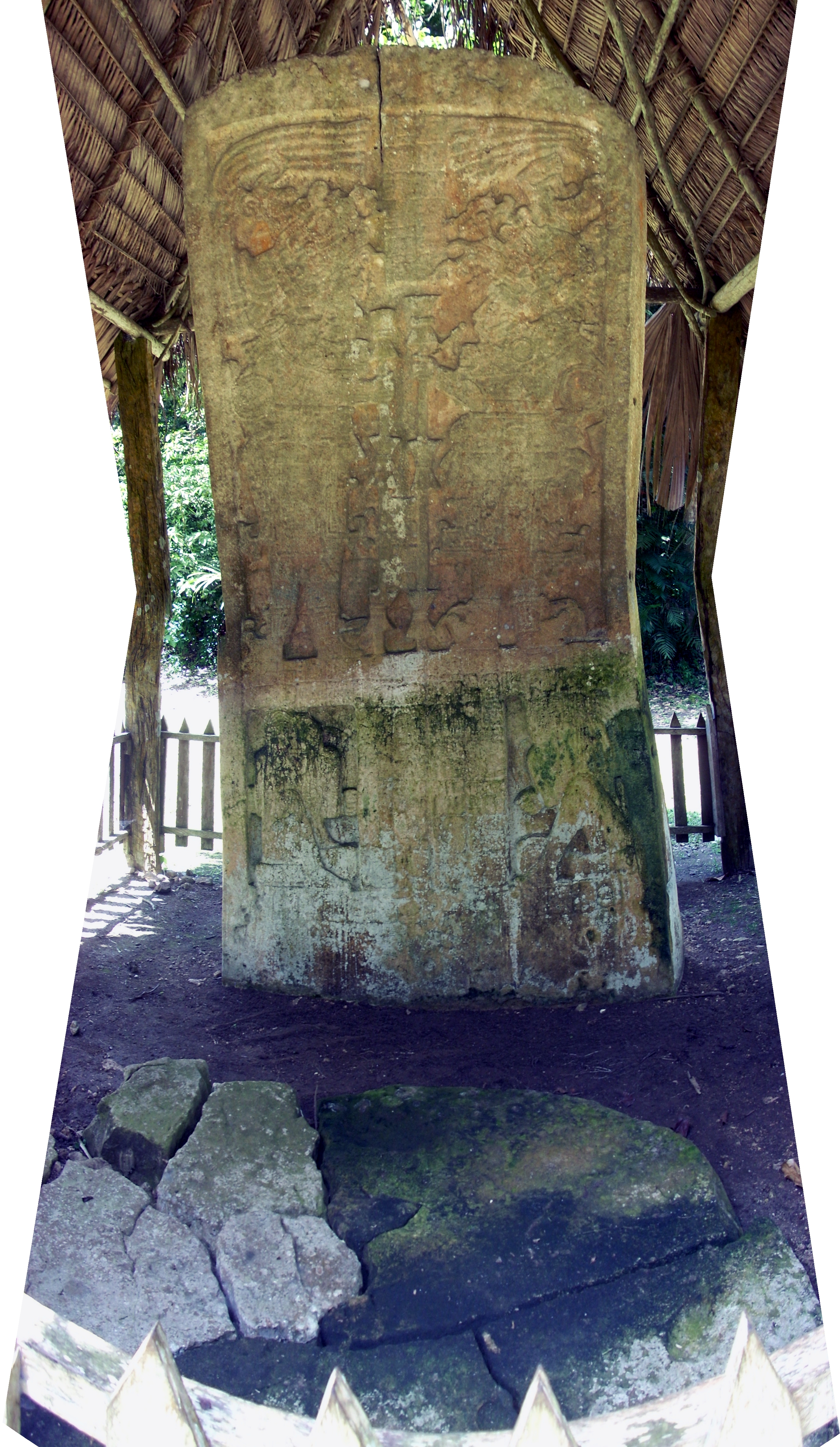
- The monarch's depiction in Stela 1 of Ixkun, together with king of that city, Rabbit God K, who he visited on 11 October 790.

King of Sacul
- Reign: c.760-790
- Born: Sacul
- Died: c.790 Sacul
- Religion: Maya religion

Chʼiyel (ruled c. 760–790+) was the only known Maya king of Sacul, El Petén, city in Guatemala.

It appears that he was the most powerful ruler at Sacul and is recorded as having participated in a number of events, including wars, rituals and royal visits. He was also likely to have been the ruler responsible for the greatest period of construction activity at the city.

On 12 February 760 he is recorded as having received a visit from king Shield Jaguar II of Ucanal, who oversaw Chʼiyel receiving his mannequin sceptre, a symbol of rulership.

Stela 2 of Sacul was raised to commemorate the visit of Chʼiyel to Ixkun on a date that has been reconstructed as 9.18.0.0.0. in the Mesoamerican calendar (11 October 790) and bears portraits of the kings of both Sacul and Ixkun.
