= Ixkun =

Archaeological Maya site in Guatemala

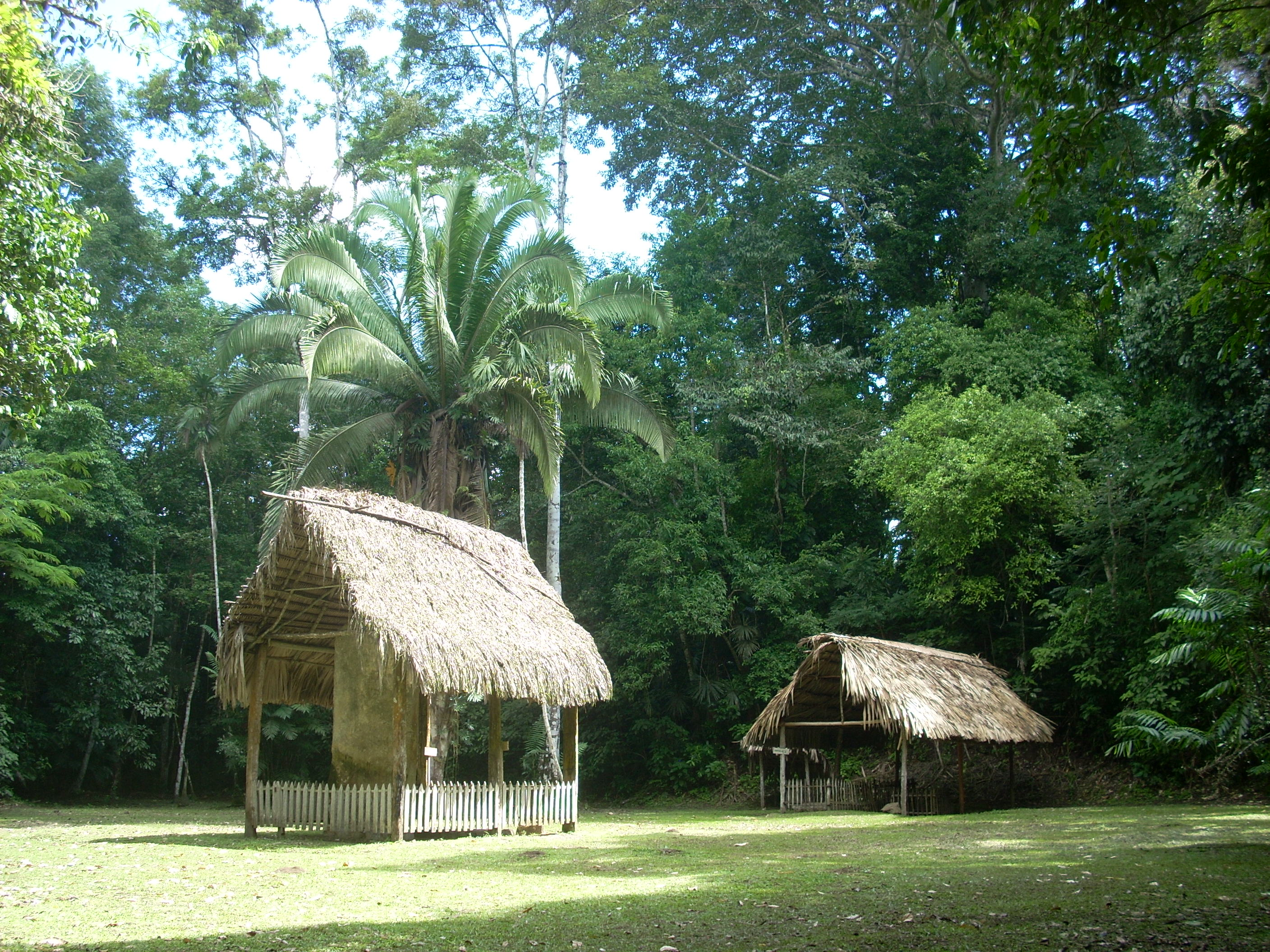
- The North Plaza with Stelae 1 and 2

- Location within modern Guatemala
- 16°34′25″N 89°24′40″W
- Periods: Late Classic
- Cultures: Maya civilization
- Location: Dolores
- Region: Petén Department, Guatemala

Site notes
- Architectural style: Classic Maya
- Archaeologists: Juan Pedro Laporte Atlas Arqueológico de Guatemala

Ixkun (Ixcún or Ixkún in Spanish orthography) is a pre-Columbian Maya archaeological site, situated in the Petén Basin region of the southern Maya lowlands. It lies to the north of the town of Dolores, in the modern-day department of Petén, Guatemala. It is a large site containing many unrestored mounds and ruins and is the best known archaeological site within the municipality of Dolores.

Ixkun was the capital of one of the four largest kingdoms in the upper Mopan Valley, the others being Curucuitz, Ixcol and Ixtonton. Eight sites fell within the boundaries of the kingdom, showing a clear hierarchy. Stela 1 at Ixkun is one of the tallest stone monuments in the entire Petén Basin.

Although the main period of activity was during the Late Classic Period, the site was occupied from the Late Preclassic right through to the Postclassic Period.

== Location ==
Ixkun is located within the municipality of Dolores, 6.5 kilometres (4.0 mi) north of the town itself. The site is situated upon the Dolores plateau in the southern portion of the Petén Department of Guatemala, in the northwestern portion of the Maya Mountains. It occupies a series of karstic hills within a wide valley that covers 25 square kilometres (9.7 sq mi). The Mopan River flows 4 kilometres (2.5 mi) east of the ruins. The area covered by the kingdom included wide expanses suitable for agriculture, parts of the floodplains of the Mopan and Xa'an Rivers. The city was situated upon a north–south trade route that linked the Dolores Valley to the Mopan River, controlling access to Ucanal and other cities within the Mopan drainage.

Ixkun is located 35 kilometres (22 mi) southwest of the ruins of the major Maya city of Caracol. It is 7.5 kilometres (4.7 mi) north of the ruins of Ixtonton.

== Known rulers ==
Nickname	Ruled
Eight Skull	–c. 790
Rabbit God K	c. 790–800

== History ==
Ixkun was first occupied in the Late Preclassic Period, with Early Classic structures built over the earlier Preclassic remains. The period of greatest activity was the Late Classic, extensive occupation continued into the Terminal Classic, although at that time construction projects were abandoned before completion. There is also evidence of low-level occupation continuing into the Postclassic Period. As of 2005, no Emblem Glyph had been identified for Ixkun, due in large part to the highly eroded nature of the hieroglyphic inscriptions at the site.

The history of Ixkun appears to be closely tied to that of the neighbouring city of Sacul. The alliances and conflicts between Ixkun and other sites in the northwestern Maya Mountains, such as Sacul and Ucanal, indicate wider political relationships within the central Maya lowlands.

=== Preclassic ===
The earliest settlement within the area of the later Ixkun kingdom was in the Middle Preclassic in the minor archaeological sites El Pedregal and Mopan 3-East. Ixkun itself shows some evidence of occupation in the Preclassic, although this was more oriented toward ritual activity in caves nearby.

=== Early Classic ===
In the Early Classic, settlement extended to Mopan 3-Southeast and Ixkun itself. A few Early Classic ceramic remains were recovered from around the base of Group 38 near the site core.

=== Late Classic ===
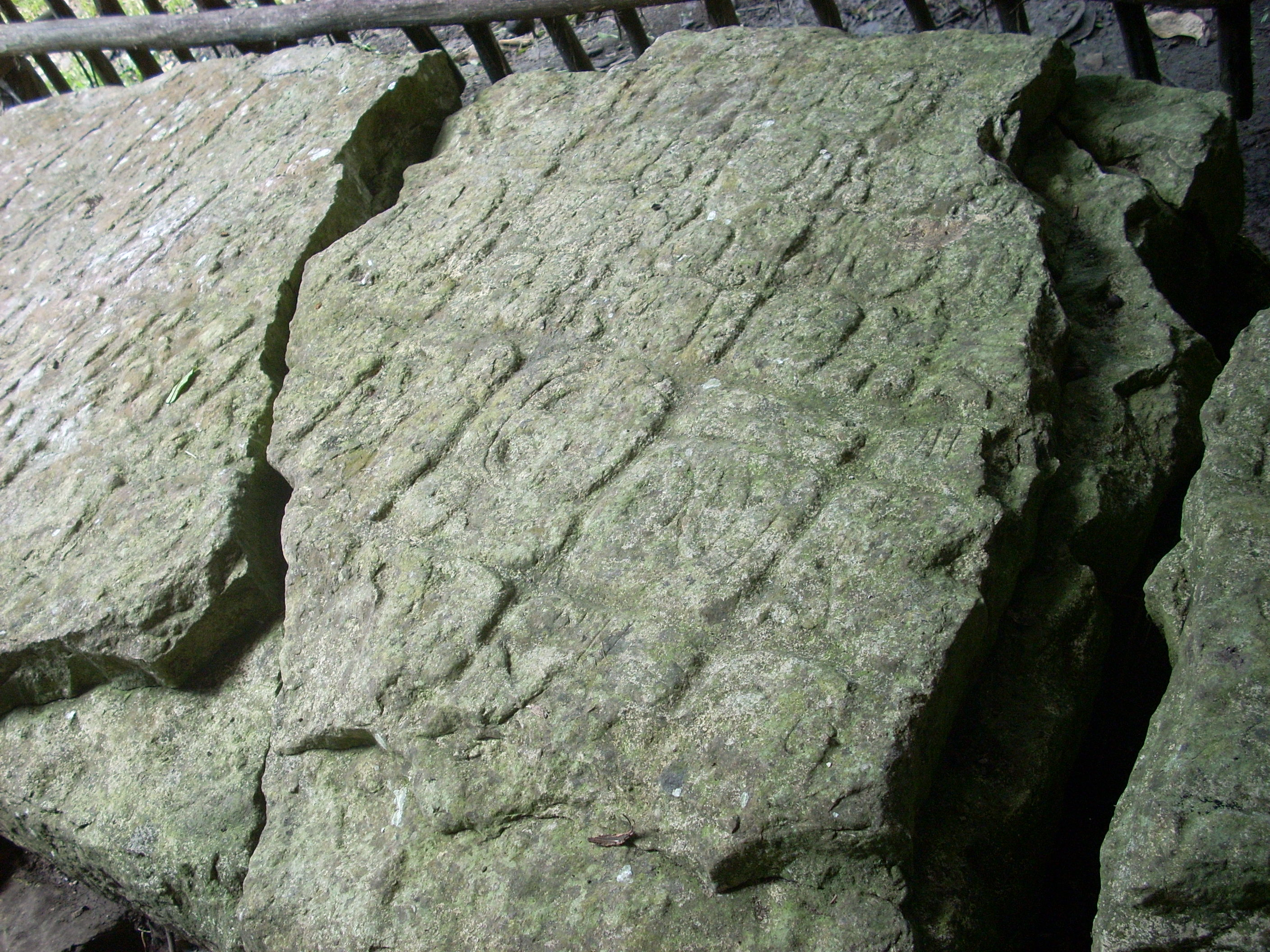
Hieroglyphic text on the fallen Stela 2

Ixkun experienced a period of stable expansion during the Late Classic Period, with enlargement of the site core, increased residential areas and the erection of stone monuments. During the Late Classic Ixkun emerged as the capital of the kingdom. At this time Ixkun controlled a large territory within which it established a number of secondary sites, including Mopan 3-West and Xa'an Abajo in the west, El Tz'ic in the south and La Jutera in the northwest. The kingdom appears to have reached its apogee around the end of the 8th century AD, as demonstrated by the sculpted monuments at the site.

Tum Yohl K'unich, the late 8th-century king of Caracol, took part in a ritual overseen by the king of Ixkun. This was recorded in a hieroglyphic text painted onto the wall of the Naj Tunich cave.

Ixkun was burned in AD 779. In the same year, Ixkun went to war against Sacul, the battle was fought on December 21 and Ixkun appears to have been victorious. On 10 May 780, Ixkun fought another victorious battle, this time against Ucanal. Sacul and Ucanal are known to have had an alliance, so it has been theorised that after Ixkun's defeat of the former, Ucanal intervened to assist it and was defeated in turn. It is believed that these conflicts were carried out during the rule of king "Eight Skull" of Ixkun. Ixkun's hostility with Sacul did not last, stelae at both cities record the visit of Ch'iyel, king of Sacul, to Ixkun on 11 October 790, when king Rabbit God K ruled. Ixkun and Sacul formed a military alliance at this time against another city whose identity is unclear, although it could be Ixtonton.

=== Terminal Classic ===
Ixkun was densely occupied during the Terminal Classic Period. Around AD 800 the king "Rabbit God K" erected the last sculpted monument at the city and was preparing new construction projects, with construction material piled ready for use in various places in the site core, however these projects were never finished. However, activity continued into the Terminal Classic in the residential areas of the city, suggesting that the workforce was being used elsewhere rather than that the city was abandoned. The most likely explanation is that Ixkun was eclipsed by nearby Ixtonton and the much reduced population was now dependent upon that polity, a fate that also befell the other cities of the Dolores Plateau in the Terminal Classic.

=== Postclassic ===
Evidence of domestic activity during the Postclassic was excavated from Group 37, to the east of the North Causeway. Group 38, immediately west of the same causeway, was also occupied during the Postclassic.

=== Modern history ===
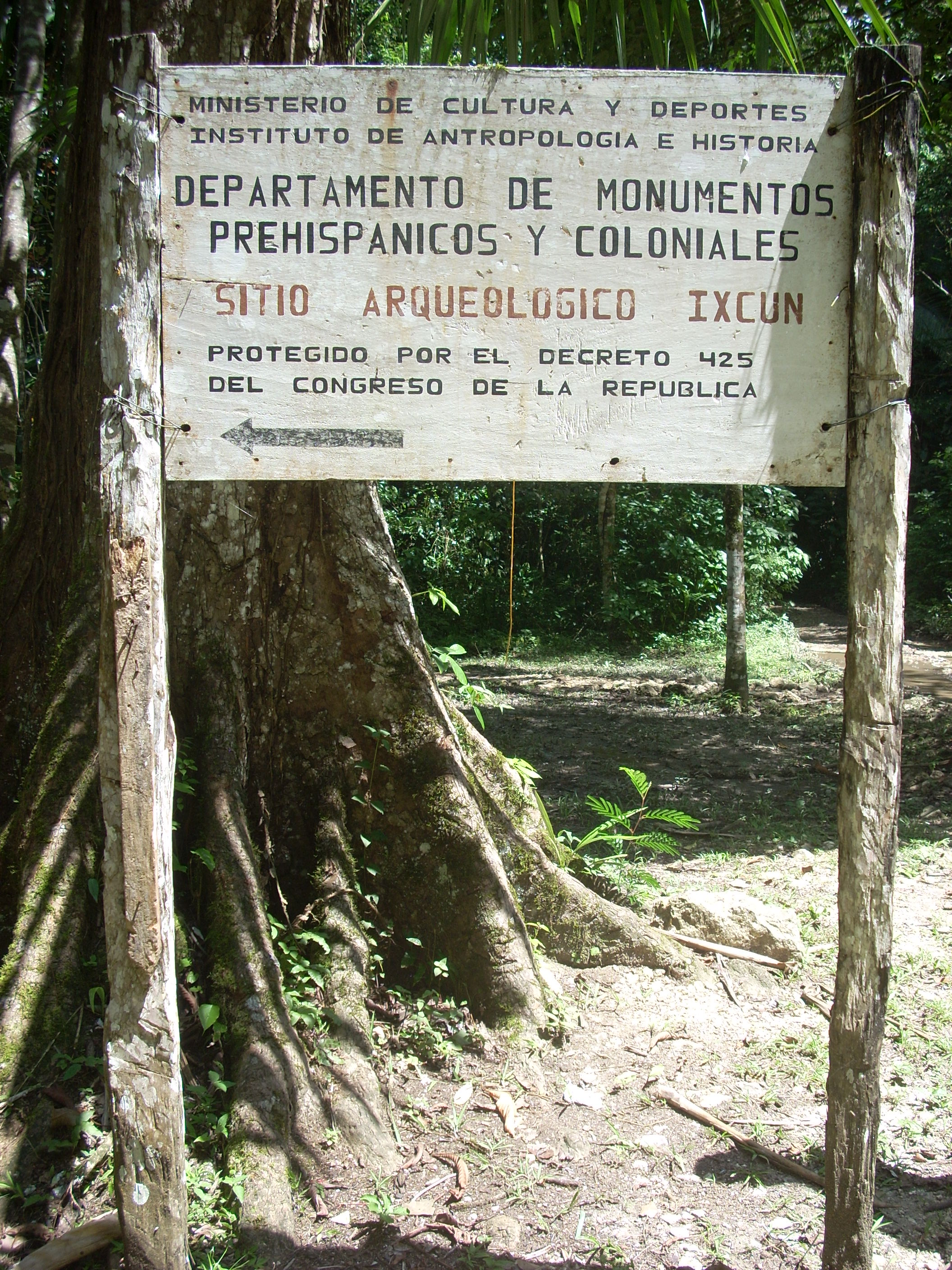
Entrance to the Ixkun archaeological site

Ixkun has been explored since the 19th century, in large part due to the presence at the site of the impressive Stela 1. Modesto Méndez, governor of Petén, visited the ruins in 1852, he may have commissioned Eusebio Lara to draw the monuments. Alfred Maudslay visited Ixkun in 1887, he mapped the ruins and may have been the discoverer of Stelae 2 and 3. He also drew and photographed Stela 1 and made a mould of it. Maudslay's excavation of the summit of Structure 6 on the Main Plaza was one of the earliest formal archaeological investigations in the Maya Lowlands.

Sylvanus Morley visited the site in 1914 with Herbert Spinden. They remapped the ruins and recorded some of the inscriptions as well as photographing the monuments.

Ian Graham visited Ixkun in 1971, 1972 and 1978, he also remapped the site and photographed the monuments. He moved the surviving pieces of the looted Stela 5 to Dolores for safekeeping. From 1985 onwards Ixkun has been investigated by the Altas Arqueológico de Guatemala ("Archaeological Atlas of Guatemala"). The two causeways were explored by Oswaldo Gómez in 1993. Group 50 was excavated by Claudia Valenzuela, Group 37 was explored by Varinia Matute and Group 38 was excavated by Erika M. Gómez, all in 2001.

== Site description ==
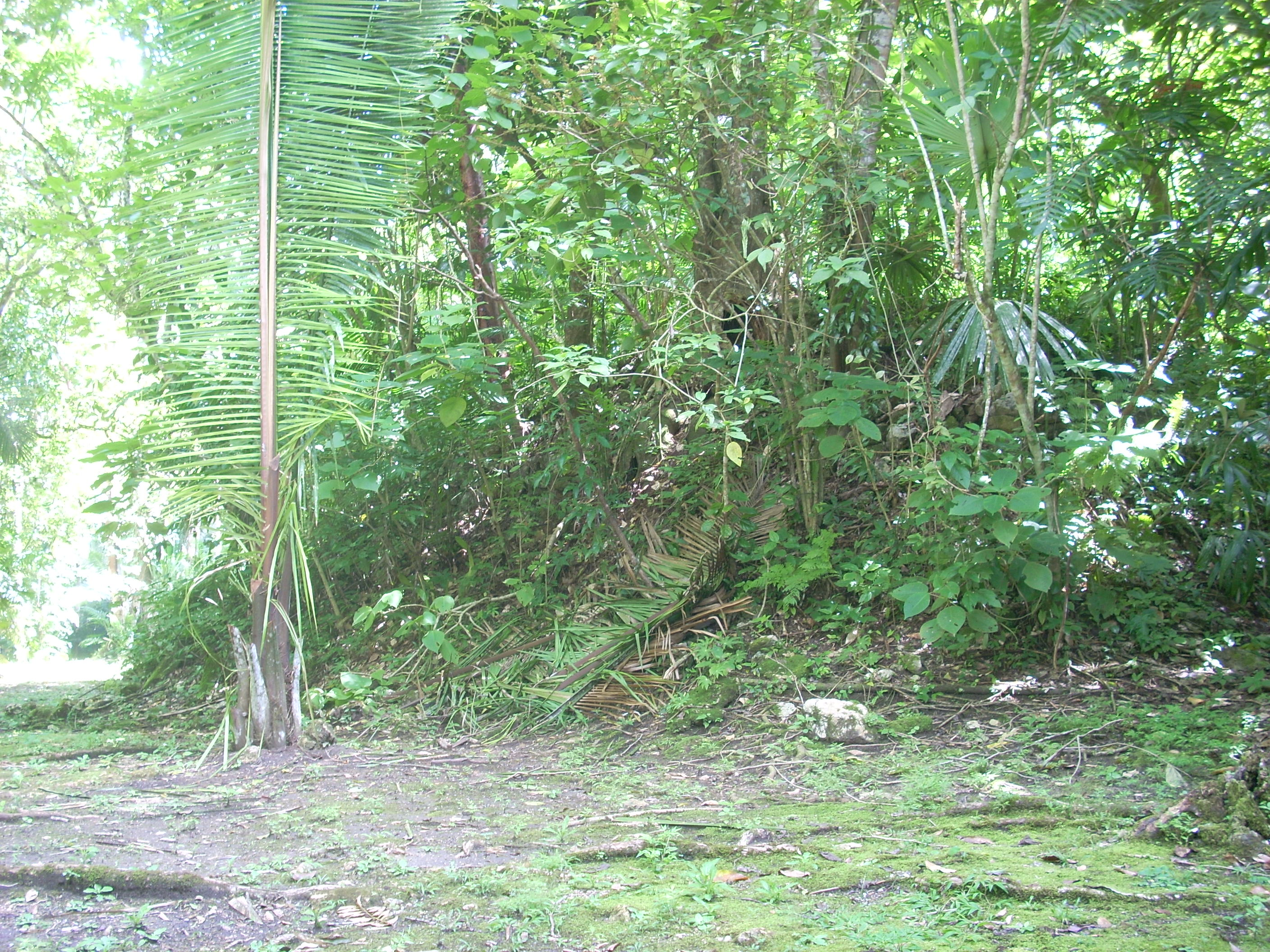
Structure in the Central Plaza

Ixkun shows signs of occupation dating from the Preclassic Period (ca. 200), reaching its height in the Late Classic (ca. 600–900). The site is large (encompassing some 16 kilometres (9.9 mi)), its central area including a ballcourt, temples, vaulted palaces, an E-Group complex and 2 mid-size stepped pyramids, among other structures. Archaeologists have mapped 51 architectural groups within the ancient city, located both inside and outside the bounds of the protected archaeological park. The majority of these were residential in nature. There are at least 46 residential groups with 245 mounds and several chultuns (artificial subterranean chambers used for fresh water and storage). An important architectural complex is located on a hill immediately to the south of the site core. Four nearby caves show evidence of having been used for ceremonial purposes during the Classic Period.

The site core underwent three formal construction phases during the Late Classic period. The first phase, although dated to the Late Classic, is not associated with any sculpted monuments and therefore has not been precisely dated. The second phase has been associated with Stela 2, and dated to around 779 AD. The third phase has been dated to around 790 AD due to its association with Stela 1.

=== Site core ===
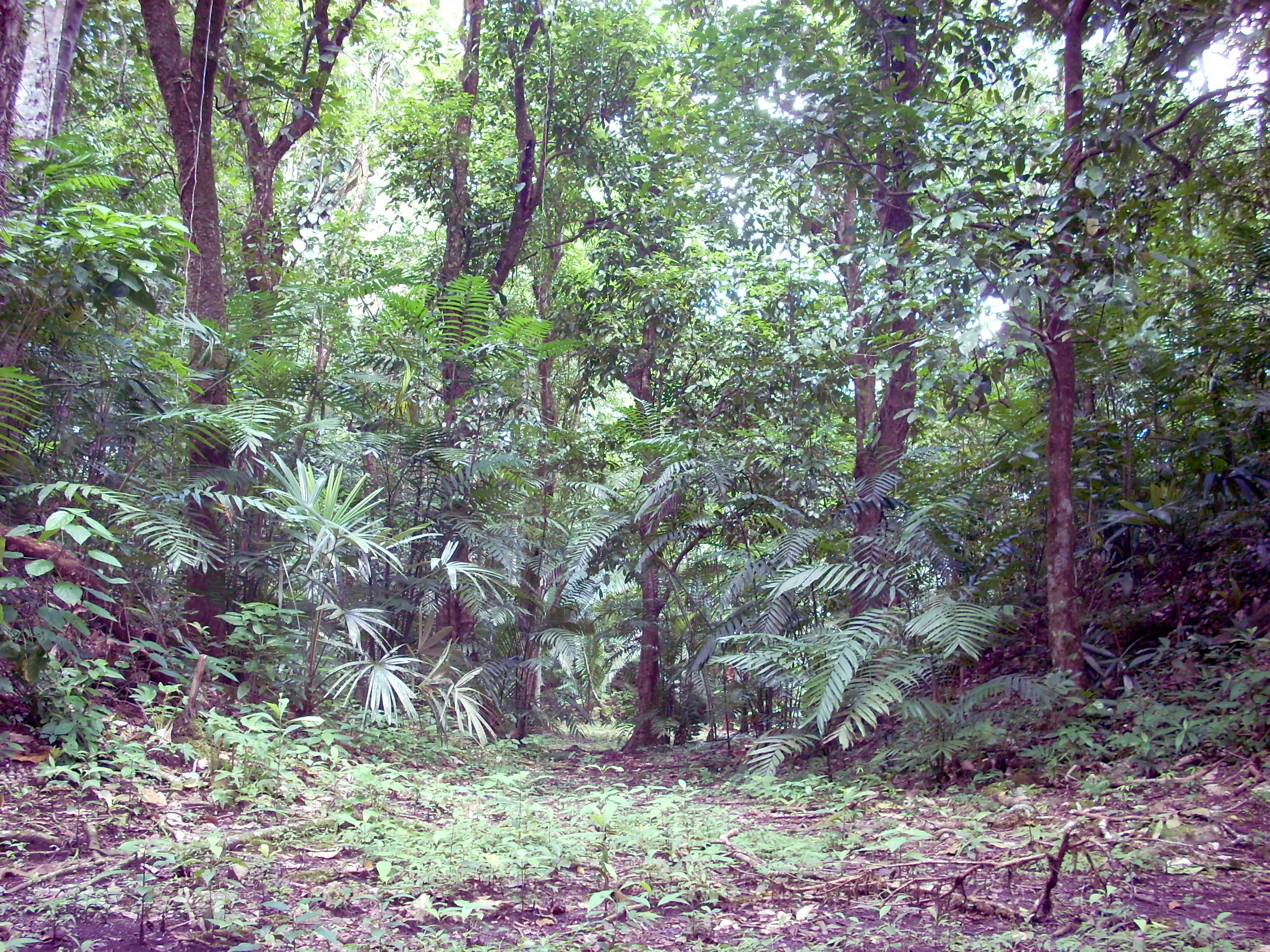
The overgrown ballcourt

The site core is arranged around a number of plazas.

Tha Acropolis was built around a number of patios. Patio 1 was built around 779, during the second principal construction phase of the city centre. Patio 2 shows unfinished construction dating to the Terminal Classic. Two structures were in use when the city centre was abandoned, but a third structure (Structure 18) was merely a pile of fill waiting to be covered.

The North Plaza (also known as Plaza A) was also occupied during the first construction phase of the Late Classic period.

The Central Plaza (also known as Plaza B) was first occupied the earliest construction phase during the Late Classic period.

The South Plaza (also known as Plaza C) was laid out during the second construction phase, dated to around 779.

The E-Group is located in the centre of the city. It consists of six structures laid out in a typical arrangement for this type of architectural complex. The East Platform supports a temple with a number of rooms, while the West Pyramid has a square base. The East Platform and West Pyramid were built during the earliest of the three Late Classic construction phases, the complex was expanded with the addition of the north and south platforms during the second phase, around 779.

The Ballcourt is also located in the site core, the earliest version was built during the second construction phase around 779. The end zones are open and it is aligned north–south.

The South Group (also known as Group 3) is located upon a hill about 200 metres (660 ft) south of the site core and is linked to it by a causeway.

==== Causeways ====
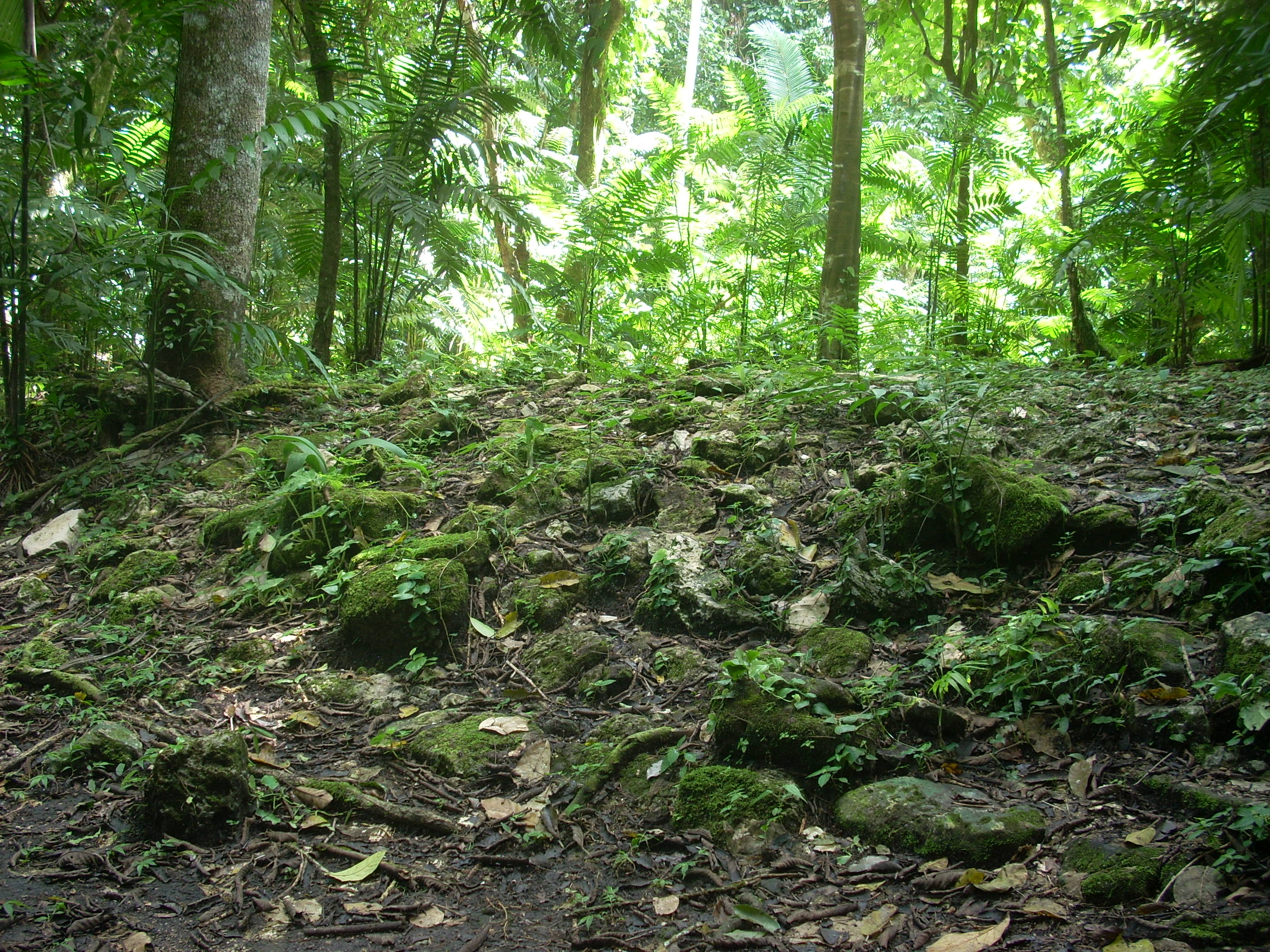
The parapet of the South Causeway

The South Causeway runs southwards from the eastern side of the South Plaza to the South Group. It is 215 metres (705 ft) long and 15 metres (49 ft) wide. It is raised 1.3 metres (4.3 ft) above the forest floor. It unites the South and Central Plazas with the South Group. At the southern end of the causeway, at the foot of the hill supporting the South Group, is a platform that was associated with a number of monuments, including Stela 5, Monument 6 and a circular altar. Near the middle of the causeway were found the remains of Monument 13. Near the central portion, the parapet of the causeway also served to contain a small reservoir. The reservoir was prevented from overflowing onto the causeway by a drain, near to which was found an offering of six small ceramic vessels that were interred when the causeway was built in the Late Classic.

The North Causeway runs northwards from the north side of the North Plaza to Group 50. It is 288 metres (945 ft) long and 14 metres (46 ft) wide. The causeway is raised 1.45 metres (4.8 ft) above the forest floor. The causeway has well-preserved 1.5-metre-wide (4.9 ft) parapets; the eastern parapet also served to protect against flooding by the Arroyo Este stream (literally "East Stream").

==== Group 37 ====
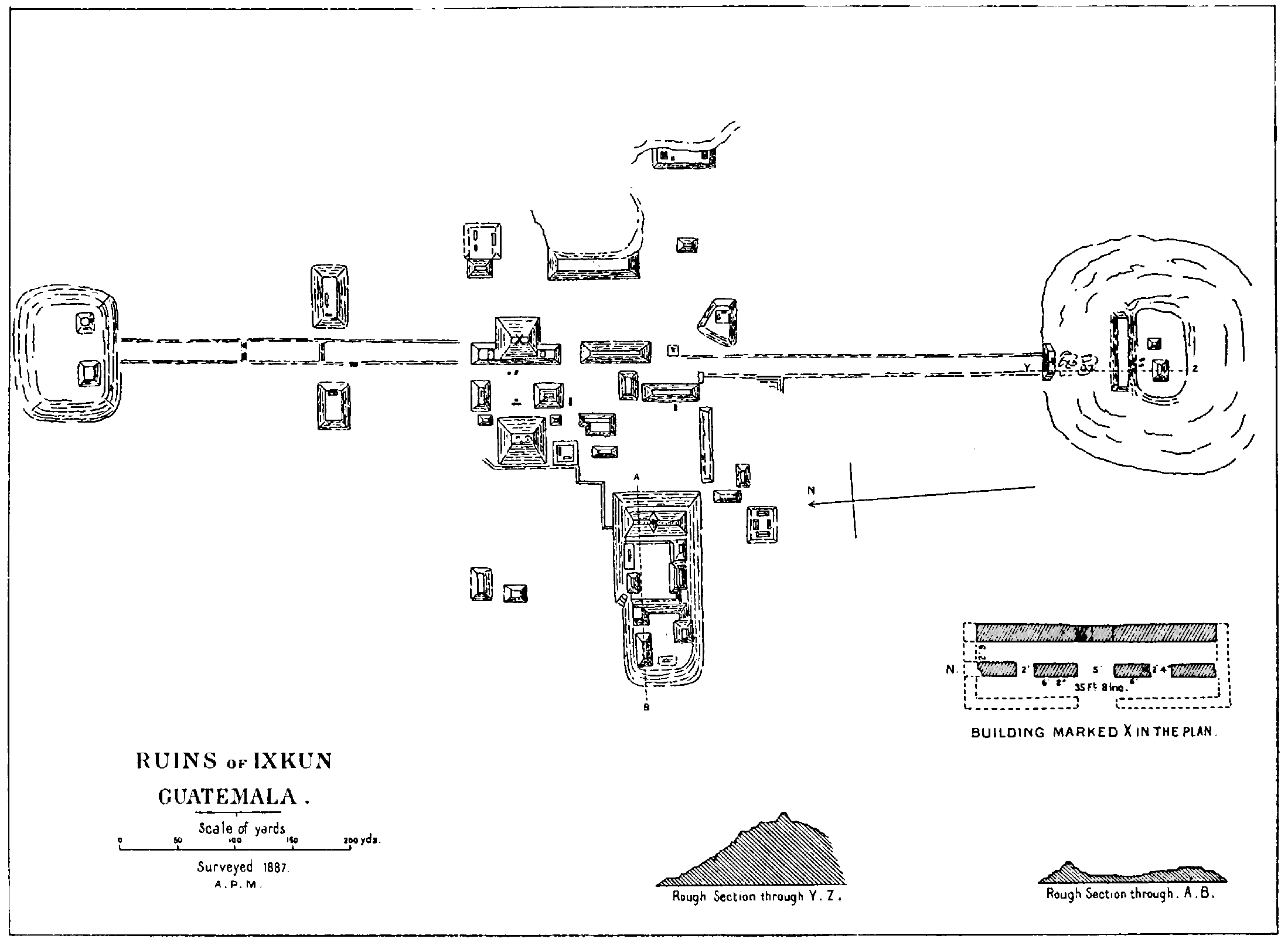
Map of Ixkun site core by Alfred Percival Maudslay, 1887

Group 37 is a complex located to the east of the North Causeway. The complex was largely dated to the Late Classic, at which time there was an almost total absence of domestic activity. Combined with its position close to the North Causeway, this has led investigators to conclude that the complex served an administrative function and may have controlled access to the plazas of the site core. In the Terminal Classic its function appears to have changed and domestic activity started, represented by an increase in ceramic remains and the insertion of a Terminal Classic burial.

Structure 37 is the main platform. It measures 37 by 19 metres (121 by 62 ft) and appears to have been of some importance. The platform stands 5.7 metres (19 ft) high and supports three structures. The platform was accessed via a stairway on the south side. Structure 37 was built in three distinct construction phases. The earliest of these phases dates to the Early Classic, the second phase is 1.75 metres (5.7 ft) above the first and dates to the Late Classic. At this time one of the additional structures were built upon the platform. The third phase also dates to the Late Classic, when two further buildings were added. Occupation of Group 37 continued through the Terminal Classic into the Postclassic Period. Burial 228 was found in Structure 37, under the patio, near the top of the access stairway.

Structure 37-A is located upon the western portion of Structure 37 and it is the principal structure in the complex. This structure was the first of the three buildings to be built upon the main platform and for some time was the only building to stand upon it. The structure measured 11 by 5.6 metres (36 by 18 ft). An inset stairway climbs the front face of the platform to the upper level, measuring 6.8 by 2.5 metres (22.3 by 8.2 ft). Excavations revealed that Structure 37-A was built in a single construction phase.

Structure 37-B is situated upon the northern part of Structure 37. It was built in the Late Classic during the third construction phase and rests upon the floor built during the second phase. It was a low rectangular stepped platform measuring 12 by 4.2 metres (39 by 14 ft). This structure was badly preserved but did not appear to have a stairway.

Structure 37-C is on the eastern side of Structure 37. It was built during the same construction phase as Structure 37-B, also resting upon the second phase floor. It was a low rectangular platform with a single course of stonework and measured 4.5 by 3.3 metres (15 by 11 ft).

==== Group 38 ====
Group 38 is a complex located to the west of the North Causeway, built on a high platform. The group is located close to the western parapet of the causeway. Very few ceramic remains were recovered from the group, with little more than 400 fragments being collected. The majority of activity at the group took place during the Terminal Classic, when the construction of the upper portions of the complex took place. A few Early Classic ceramic remains were recovered, largely from around the base, and occupation continued into the Postclassic. The group appears to have served an administrative function linked to control of the causeway, and this appears to have remained constant throughout most of its history. A few stone tools indicate some level of domestic activity took place at the group from the Terminal Classic into the Postclassic.

Structure 38 is the basal platform; it was built during the Early Classic. It measures 28 metres (92 ft) east-west by 15 metres (49 ft) north-south. The platform stands 4.3 metres (14 ft) high. The platform was accessed via a stairway on the west side. Structure 38 supports two low platforms consisting of a single course of stonework. Both sections support large structures on their northern portions. A few ceramic remains were found around the lower portions of the platform, some of which date to the Early Classic.

Structure 38-A was not properly explored due to its very poor state of preservation.

Structure 38-B and Structure 38-C form a single platform that supports a further rectangular platform. Excavations revealed earth and stone infill. The structures were built at the same time as the basal platform (Structure 38-C). The majority of the ceramic remains were recovered from Structure 38-C and date to the Terminal Classic.

==== Group 50 ====
Group 50 is located just under 300 metres (980 ft) to the north of the site core and is joined to it by the North Causeway. Group 50 consists of 4 structures located at the extreme north of the city. The two main buildings are Structures 41 and 43, located near the entrance to the causeway and at the same level. There are two smaller structures, 42 and 42-A, built upon the natural terrain to the southeast of the principal complex. Very few artefacts were recovered from the group, with the majority being ceramic fragments dating to the Late to Terminal Classic.

Structure 41 is one of the two principal structures in the group. Due to its size, it was not explored during excavations of Group 50 in 2001.

Structure 42 is a low rectangular platform situated on the east side of a courtyard. The lower platform supports a bench, with both levels being composed of a single course of stonework and standing 0.3 metres (0.98 ft) high.

Structure 42-A defines the south side of the courtyard. Only the northern wall was located during excavations due to advanced erosion of the platform.

Structure 43 is the second of two principal structures in Group 50. It was not explored during excavations of Group 50 in 2001 due to its size.

=== Structures ===
Structure 3 faces onto the North Plaza.

=== Monuments ===
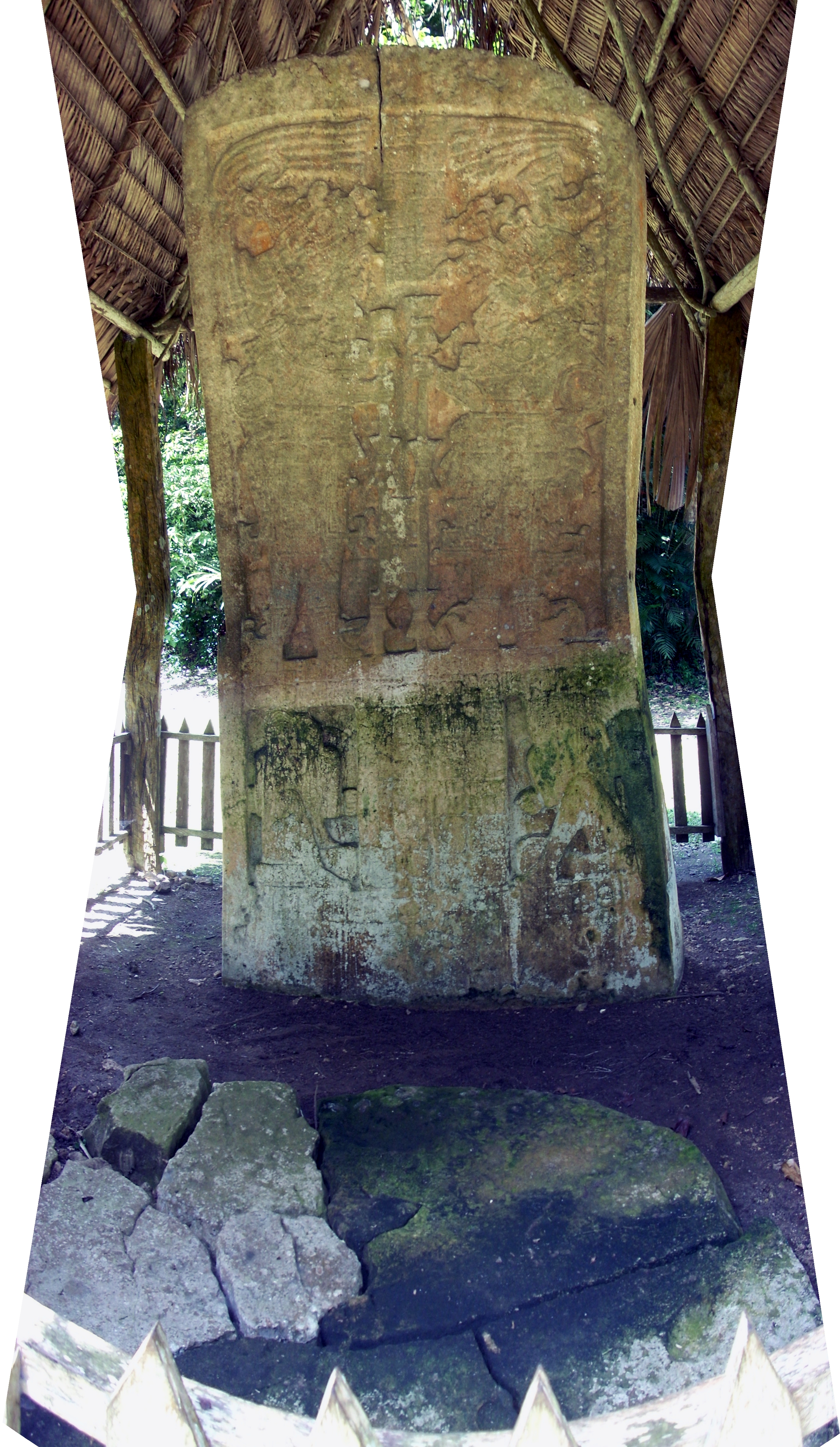
Ixkun Stela 1 is one of the tallest stelae in Petén; it is paired with Altar 1

Seven sculpted monuments have been found at Ixkun, including both stelae and altars. Five of these refer to events occurring between AD 766 and 800. There are also a further 11 plain monuments. The monuments all possess a common sculptural style, one that is common to the Maya cities of the southeastern Petén. Most of the stelae belonging to this sculptural tradition are only carved on one side. On the majority, rulers are depicted standing and facing left with the legs parted to form a triangle. The depiction of war captives underneath the ruler's image is stylistically similar to representations in the Petexbatun and Pasión River region.

Altogether eleven stelae are known for the site, and six altars have also been recovered.

Stela 1 was erected in the middle of the North Plaza, opposite Structure 3. It was sculpted from limestone and stands 4.13 metres (13.5 ft) high. Each edge of the monument has four holes bored into it, these holes are not large enough to have been useful in transporting the monument, archaeologists therefore believe that they were used to hold torches or banners. It is sculpted on only one face, which bears the images of king "Rabbit God K" and the visiting king Ch'iyel of Sacul, the visit is recorded as having taken place on 11 October 790. The monument has five sculpted hieroglyphic panels, although not all of the glyphs are legible. The largest panel forms a T shape underneath the portraits of the two rulers. The stela appears to record a military alliance between the two kings against an unknown city that could be Ixtonton. Ixtun Stela 1 is the largest known stela in the southeastern Petén region, measuring 4.13 metres (13.5 ft) tall, and is one of the tallest stelae in the entire Petén Basin. Stela 1 is almost unique in the southeastern Petén in depicting two important personages facing each other, the only other example comes from Sacul. The principal figures on the stela carry staffs of rulership, and two bound war captives are carved underneath the main figures. The same event is depicted on the stylistically similar Stela 2 at Sacul. The text of Stela 1 suggests that Rabbit God K's mother, Lady Ik, was originally from another city named as Akbal, which has yet to be identified.

Stela 2 records two battles, one against Sacul on 21 December 779 and the other against Ucanal on 10 May 780. The text of the stela names the predecessor of "Rabbit God K". The text is incomplete but this ruler has been nicknamed "Eight Skull" by epigraphers, and he is believed to have dedicated the monument. Stela 2 is located in front of the stairway of Structure 6, just to the north of Stela 3 in the North Plaza. It is broken into three large sections and at least ten smaller parts and is sculpted on one face only with a hieroglyphic text consisting of 45 glyphic blocks, divided into four columns. When it was first found by Alfred Maudslay in the 19th century it had already fallen face down and broken.

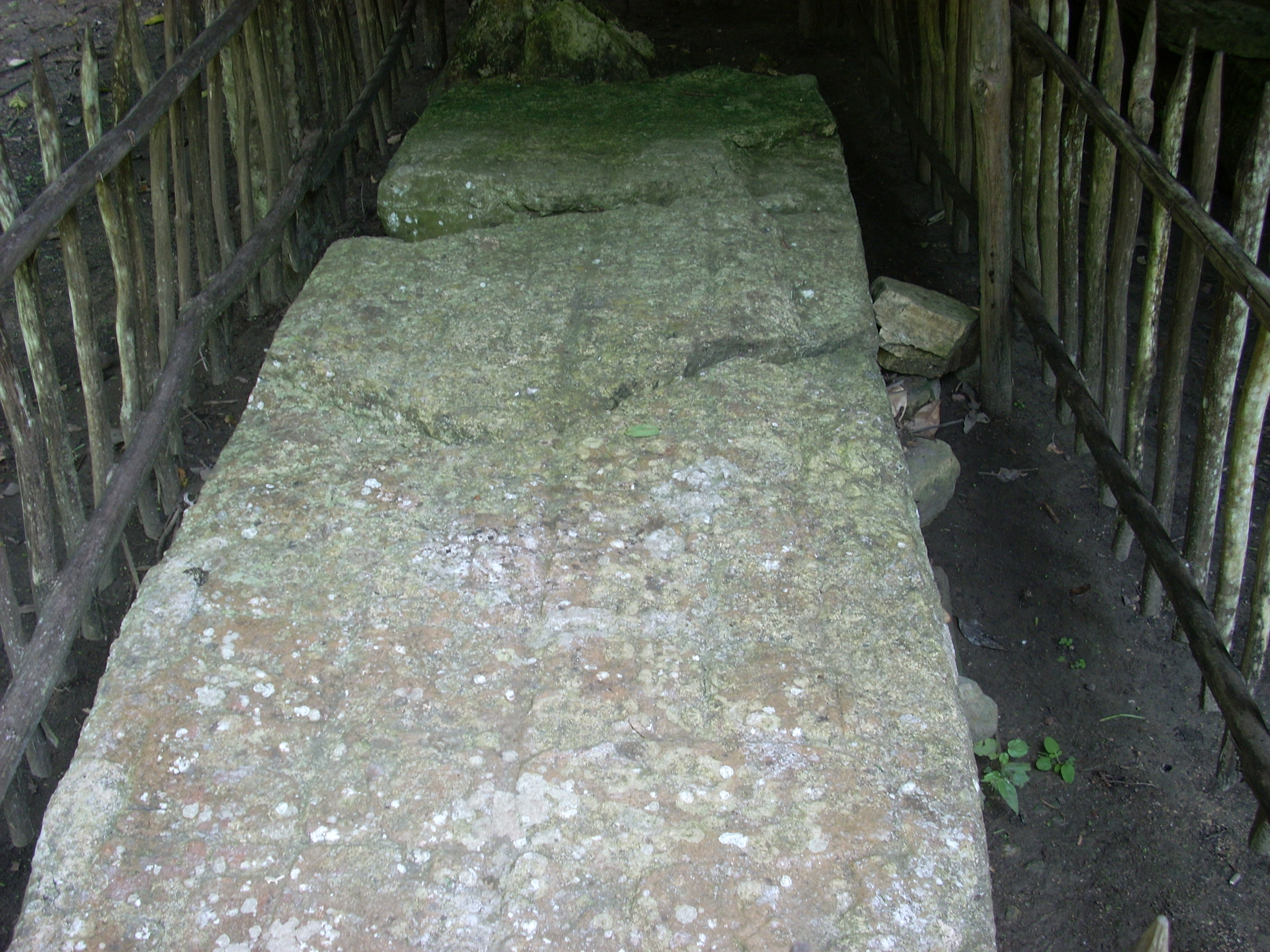
Stela 2 in the North Plaza

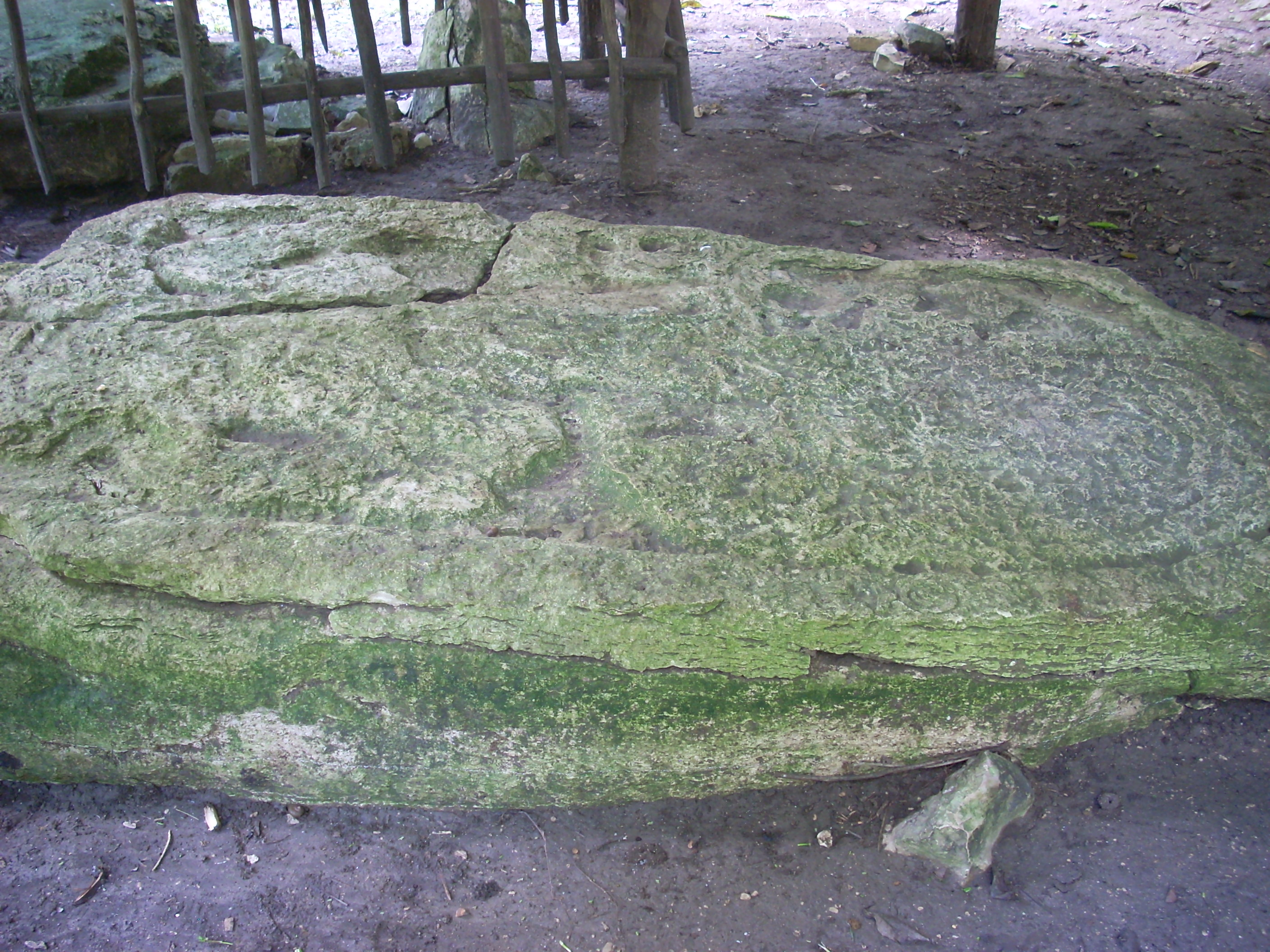
Stela 3, also in the North Plaza

Stela 3 is located by Structure 6, in the North Plaza just to the south of Stela 2. The monument is carved from fossiliferous limestone and has fallen face upwards, exposing its sculpted face to erosion. Only the upper half of the stela remains. The monument is badly eroded and it lacks any surviving hieroglyphic text; it is sculpted with the image of a ruler facing towards the left, the figure is bearing a God K sceptre, one of the symbols of rulership. The lower portion of the stela has not been found, although Ian Graham excavated the plaza looking for it. Stela 3 is associated with Altar 2.

Stela 4 is located in the Central Plaza at the base of Structure 13 and measures 4 by 1.16 metres (13.1 by 3.8 ft). The monument has fallen and suffered from erosion and fracturing, with one of the upper corners missing. Stela 4 is carved from fine grained limestone, although only one face has been sculpted. Like Stela 3, it is sculpted with the image of a ruler wielding a God K sceptre; a war captive is depicted underneath the ruler's image. Due to the similarity of the ruler's image and the similar dating to Stela 1, Stela 4 is believed to have been dedicated by "Rabbit God K". The stela has a hieroglyphic text consisting of 26 glyphs and containing a date equivalent to AD 796. The principal figure, that of the ruler, is depicted standing and facing left, wearing a feathered headdress representing a zoomorphic deity, from the forehead of which emerges a waterlily that is being nibbled by a fish. The figure is richly dressed and ornamented, with earspools and a belt with two anthropomorphic heads attached. The principal figure is very similar to the principal figure on Stela 6 from Xutilha. The prisoner is separated from the ruler above by a horizontal band, he is depicted looking upwards and to the right. He has long hair bound back and wears a short feathered headdress. Long textile strips hang from the ears. The hieroglyphic text is spread over three panels; one of these is above the ruler, the second is to the left of the ruler's leg and the last is in front of the captive. The text is badly eroded although one of the legible fragments is identical to a phrase on Stela 1, leading investigators to believe that the monument was raised by the same king.

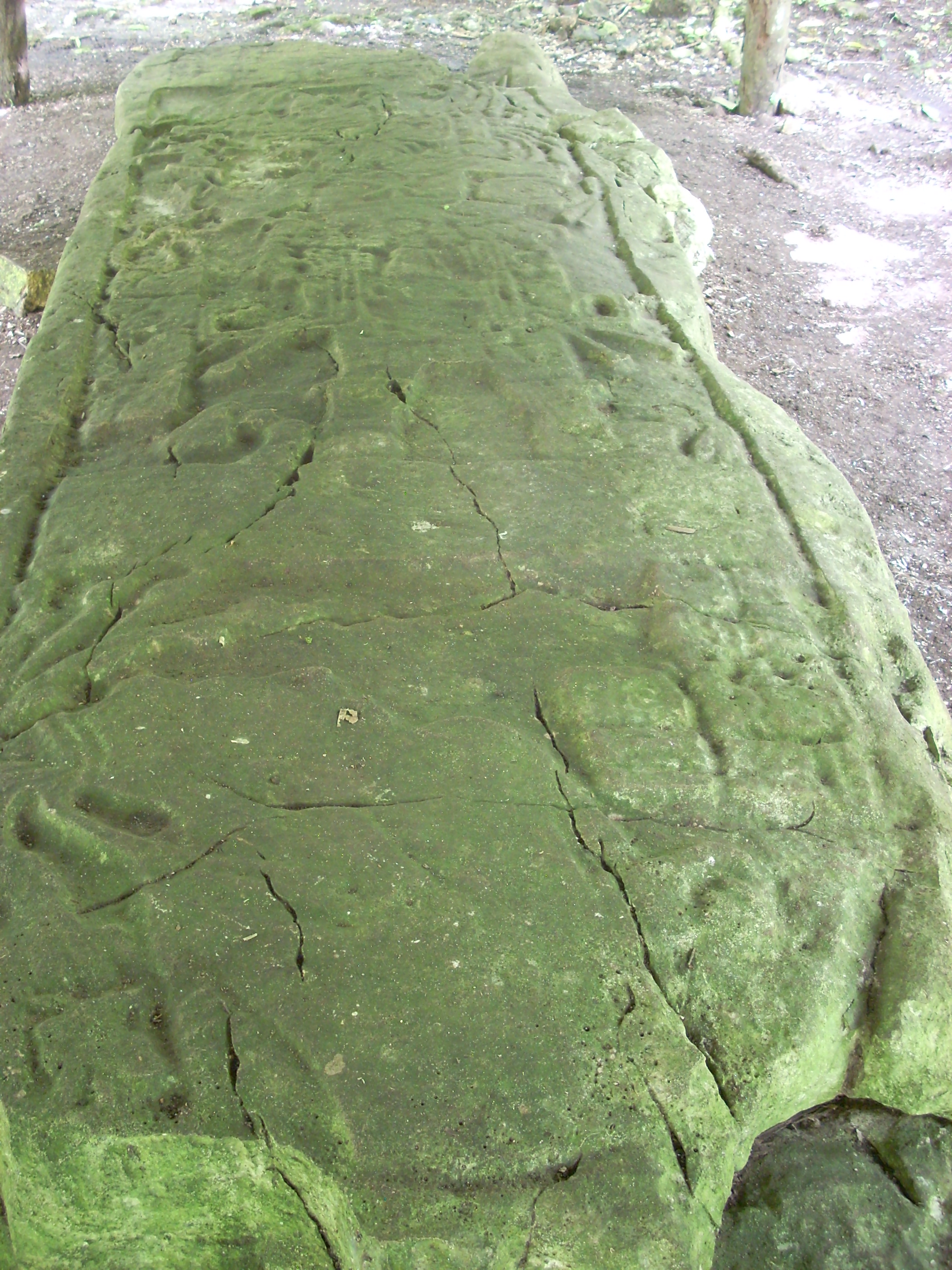
Stela 4 in the Central Plaza

Stela 5 was the last sculpted monument erected at Ixkun. It was raised by "Rabbit God K" around AD 800. The main figure on the stela is depicted carrying a staff of rulership in the left hand while the right hand scatters drops of blood or some other substance. The ruler is depicted wearing an elaborate feathered headdress in the form of the head of a jaguar or a puma. The ruler is richly decorated with jewellery including earspools, necklace and a chest ornament. The position and dress of the principal figure is similar to that depicted upon Stela 6 at Ucanal and Stela 11 at Seibal. Underneath the main figure is the sculpted figure of a war captive, separated from the figure above by a hieroglyphic panel. The captive is depicted in a seated position looking to the left with the head inclined and one leg stretched forward supporting his body; the captive wears a loincloth and his arms are bound behind his back; long strips of cloth hang from his ears. Stela 5 was raised upon a platform at the end of the South Causeway. The monument was carved from a hard-grained white limestone. Although originally it was well preserved, it was badly damaged in 1972 by looters who smashed it and stole various fragments. Some pieces of the monument were moved to Dolores by the Atlas Arqueológico de Guatemala and one piece was transferred to the Museo Nacional de Arqueología y Etnología. The hieroglyphic text upon the monument is divided into three panels, one above the ruler, one below his feet and one behind the prisoner; the upper hieroglyphic panel is badly eroded. Stela 5 was associated with Altar 3.

Stela 12 was placed at the northeast corner of Structure 10 in the Central Plaza. It is believed to have been dedicated by king "Eight Skull". Stela 12 is sculpted on one face and measures 2.6 by 0.85 metres (8.5 by 2.8 ft) by 0.2 metres (0.66 ft) thick. The monument is broken in two pieces and is missing its base. Stela 12 may have been reused in the construction of the final phase of Structure 10 and was found in 1985 by Rodrigo Hoil, a site custodian employed by the Instituto de Antropología e Historia. The monument is sculpted with a hieroglyphic text divided into two columns, unfortunately the text is too eroded to be read with precision.

Monument 6 was erected upon a platform at the south end of the South Causeway. It was a plain monument and has been broken into multiple fragments. It was associated with a plain circular altar.

Monument 13 was a plain stela located near the middle of the South Causeway. Only fragments of this monument remain.

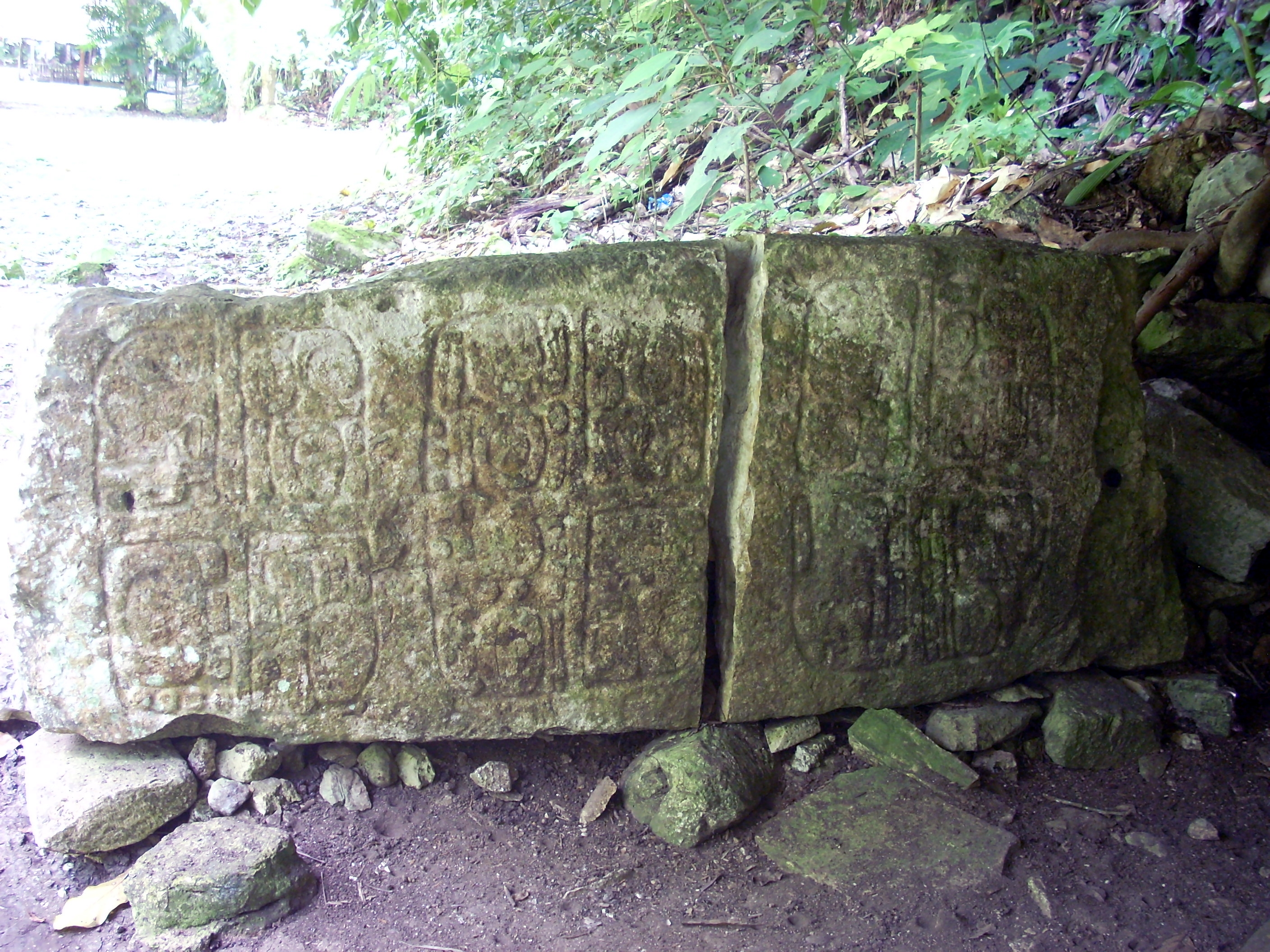
Stela 12 in the Central Plaza

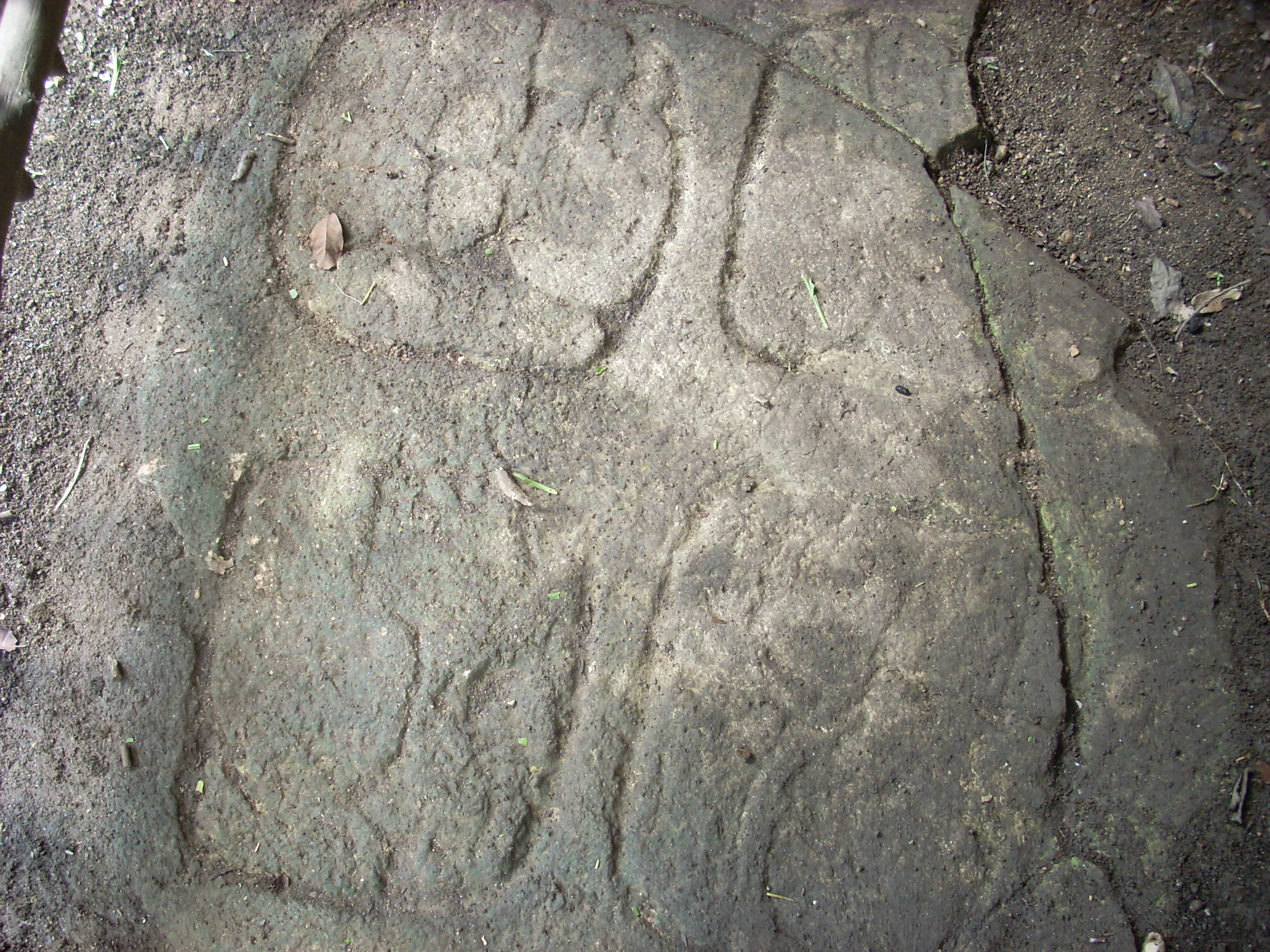
Hieroglyphs on Altar 2, in the North Plaza

Altar 1 is associated with Stela 1. It is a circular monument that is 2.05 metres (6.7 ft) in diameter and is 0.35 metres (1.1 ft) thick. Looters sunk a 1-metre (3.3 ft) wide pit under Altar 1, causing the associated stela to tilt. In 1988 the damage was repaired by workers from the Proyecto Nacional Tikal ("National Tikal Project").

Altar 2 is located 0.6 metres (2.0 ft) to the west of Stela 3 in the North Plaza. It was found buried under accumulated detritus, resting upon a cobblestone floor. It is sculpted from fossiliferous limestone and measures 1 by 1.32 metres (3.3 by 4.3 ft). The altar is fractured with one section missing and has four glyphs carved into its upper surface, although they are too badly damaged to be properly read. It has been stylistically dated to the second half of the 8th century.

Altar 3 is associated with Stela 5, at the end of the South Causeway.

=== Burials ===
Burial 228 was interred in a cist set into Structure 37. The cist measures 1.7 by 0.65 metres (5.6 by 2.1 ft) and is oriented east–west. The skeleton is extremely poorly preserved, consisting of seven bone fragments from at least one adult. The deceased was laid out with the head at the west end of the cist. The remains were accompanied by an offering of a ceramic tripod plate that was placed near the skull. A cylindrical ceramic vessel was deposited at the east end of the cist. The burial and its associated offerings have been dated to the Terminal Classic.
