= Lady Ik =

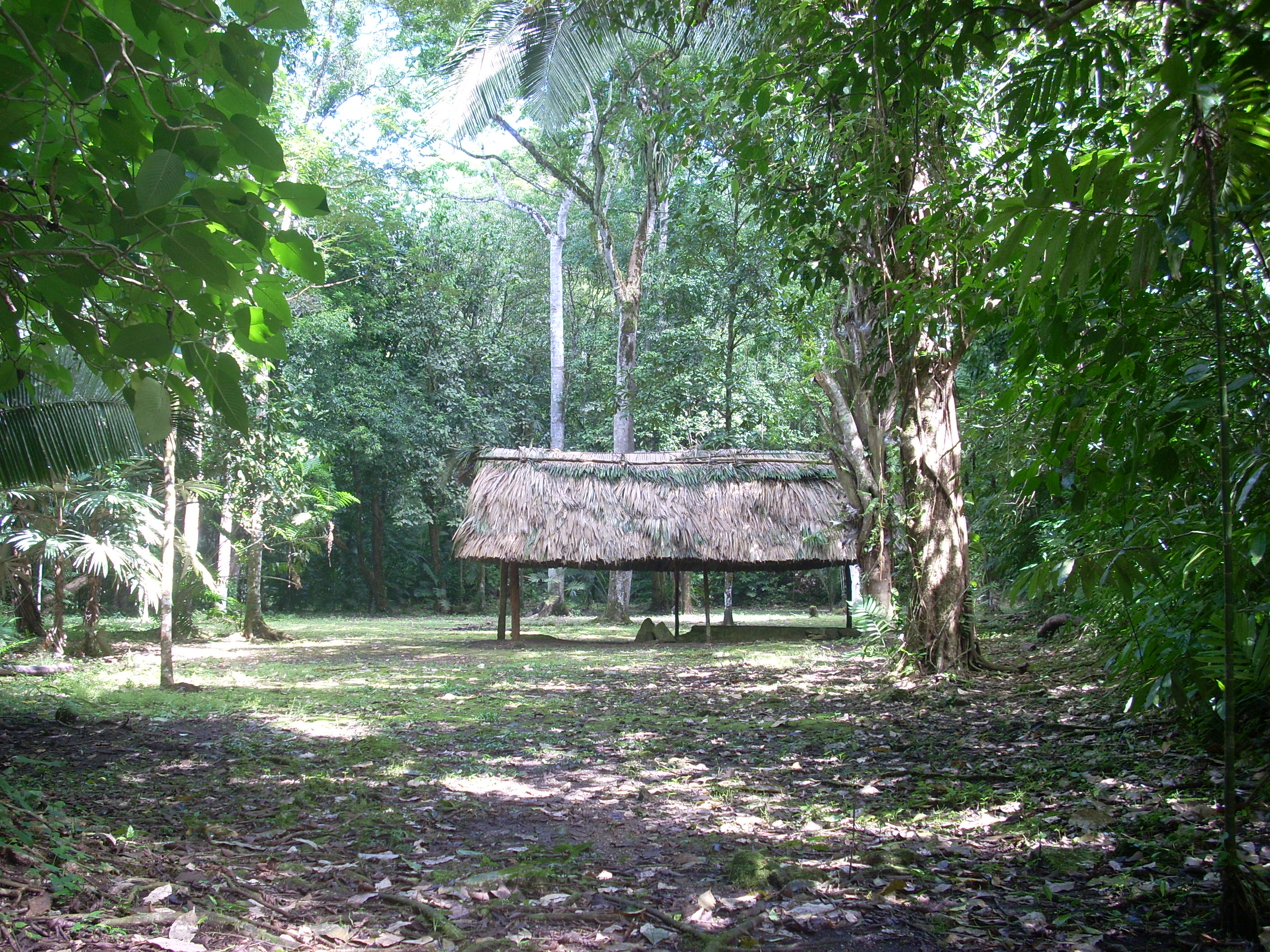
Plaza 3 at Ixkun, from where Ik's son ruled

Lady Ik (8th-century) was the mother of Rabbit God K, Maya king of Ixkun, an ancient Maya city in the Petén Department of modern Guatemala. It is possible that she was a princess.

The text of Stela 1 suggests that Lady Ik was originally from another city named Akbal, which has yet to be identified.
