= Sacul, El Petén =

Maya archaeological site in Guatemala

Coordinates: 16°35′N 89°18′W

Sacul
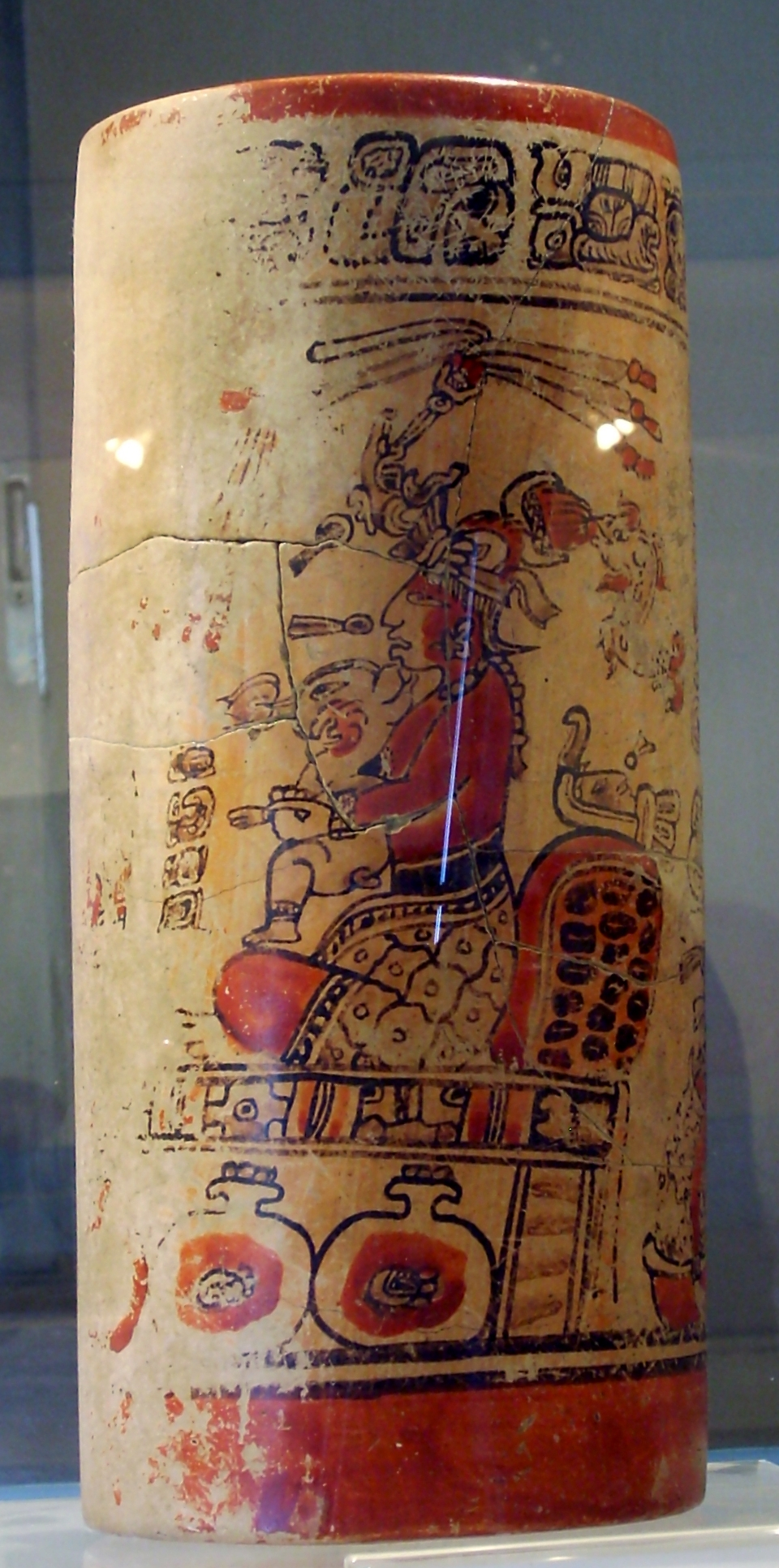
- Late Classic vase from Sacul, on display in the Museo Regional del Sureste de Petén in Dolores
- Interactive map of Sacul
- Periods: Classic Period
- Cultures: Maya civilization
- Location: Dolores
- Region: Petén Department, Guatemala

History
- Abandoned: Postclassic Period

Site notes
- Architectural style: Classic Maya
- Archaeologists: Juan Pedro Laporte

Sacul is an archaeological site of the Maya civilization located in the upper drainage of the Mopan River, in the Petén department of Guatemala. The city occupied an important trade route through the Maya Mountains. The main period of occupation dates to the Late Classic Period. In the late 8th century AD through to the early 9th century, Sacul was one of the few kingdoms in the southeastern Petén region to use its own Emblem Glyph, together with Ixtutz and Ucanal.

In AD 779 Sacul went to war against Ixkun and lost, but stelae at both cities record a visit to Ixkun by king Ch'iyel of Sacul just 11 years later and the two cities appear to have formed a military alliance at that time.

The site core is arranged around a number of plazas, one of which forms a monumental acropolis. The plazas were resurfaced in the Terminal Classic, when the city experienced a period of dense occupation. At this time Sacul experienced a major surge in construction activity, with many buildings being extended or altered. Sacul was inhabited into the Postclassic Period at a much reduced level, although it is not known if this represents a continuation of Classic Period occupation. This final phase of activity was spread throughout both the ceremonial core and the residential periphery and ceramic finds demonstrate links to the Belize Valley and the southern area of the Maya Mountains.

The site core includes pyramids, a ballcourt, a triadic complex and two E-Group astronomical complexes.

== Location ==
The Sacul Valley is located in the northern portion of the Maya Mountains, just 16 kilometres (9.9 mi) from the border with Belize. The landscape is broken and hilly, with an altitude that varies between 450 and 650 metres (1,480 and 2,130 ft) above mean sea level. The Sacul River flows northwards and forms a part of the upper Mopan River drainage system. The Sacul River joins the Mopan and Xaan Rivers, crossing into Belize where it becomes the Belize River and empties into the Caribbean Sea.

The area is crossed by north–south limestone ridges with a narrow flood plain that is never wider than 1 kilometre (0.62 mi) along the banks of the river and is closed by high cliffs. The mountain peaks around the Sacul Valley are covered with primary rainforest while the lower slopes have been cleared for milpa agriculture and cattle ranching.

The city occupied a natural route through the mountains, with routes running 28 kilometres (17 mi) south to Poptún, west to Xaan (5 kilometres (3.1 mi)) and Ixtonton (12 kilometres (7.5 mi)), north to Ucanal (36 kilometres (22 mi)), northwest to El Chal and northeast to Caracol.

== History ==
=== Known rulers ===
Name	Ruled
Ch'iyel	c.760–790+

=== Late Classic ===
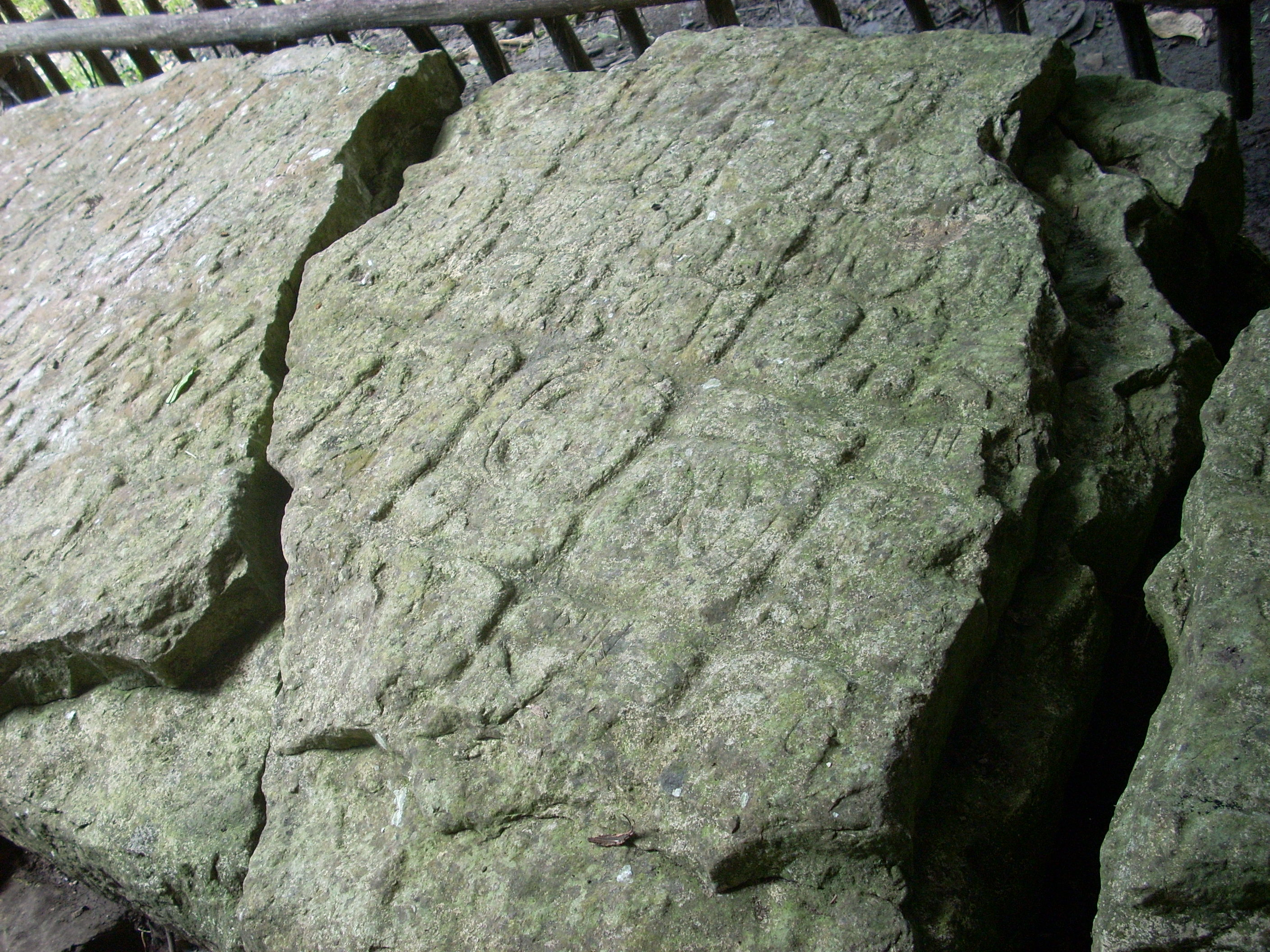
Stela 2 at Ixkun records a battle against Sacul

The cities of the northern part of the Maya Mountains first started erecting their own sculpted monuments in the period between AD 760 and 820. This appears to reflect a profound change in the political landscape at this time, with the emergence of Sacul, Ixkun, Ixtutz and Ixtonton as strongly competing polities. Of these four cities that were producing their own stelae, only Sacul and Ixtutz used their own Emblem Glyph. The 8th-century king Ch'iyel appears to have been the most powerful ruler at Sacul and is recorded as having participated in a number of events, including wars, rituals and royal visits. He was also likely to have been the ruler responsible for the greatest period of construction activity at the city. On 12 February 760 he is recorded as having received a visit from king Shield Jaguar II of Ucanal, who oversaw Ch'iyel receiving his mannequin sceptre, a symbol of rulership.

During the Late Classic period Sacul participated in a regional exchange network as well as producing its own local ceramics. Stela 2 at Ixkun records a battle between Sacul and that city that took place on 21 December 779, which Sacul appears to have lost. Ixkun fought another battle against Ucanal some months later and this may represent Ucanal intervening to support its ally, although Ixkun again appears to have been victorious. Hostilities between the two cities did not last long; the visit of king Ch'iyel of Sacul to Ixkun on 11 October 790 is recorded on stelae at both cities. The two rulers are depicted together and appear to have formed a military alliance against an unidentified city that could be Ixtonton. The object of the alliance may have been to procure captives for sacrifice; after the expedition both rulers celebrated a k'atun-ending ceremony and participated in a bloodletting ritual.

=== Terminal Classic ===
In the Terminal Classic the southeastern Petén region underwent a fundamental change in its political landscape. One change that occurred at this time was the expansion of the Sacul polity, which absorbed nearby centres such as Caxeba in the Xaan River valley and El Mozote in the Chiquibul Valley. Both of these cities were abandoned as Sacul became more powerful. Coincident with this change was the shift in the focus of trade, with an increase in the use of locally produced ceramics and a movement away from region-wide exchange to focus more on the Maya Mountains to the south.

By 820 the cities of the Dolores region one by one fell into silence as they were engulfed by the Classic Maya collapse. The last stela erected in Sacul bears a date corresponding to AD 800. Many cities were abandoned at this time but, although it ceased to erect new monuments, Sacul outlived its regional rivals and allies and survived into the Postclassic Period, when it once again participated in the regional exchange network.

== Site description ==
Sacul is grouped into 5 sites, all belonging to the same polity, and numbered from Sacul 1 through to Sacul 5 with Sacul 1 (or more commonly, simply Sacul) representing the Late Classic site core. The presence of a triadic complex in Plaza C demonstrates the city's participation in the wider sociopolitical arena of the Petén Basin, with that particular architectural form having its origin in the central Maya lowlands of the Preclassic Period.

The site core is located upon a 40-metre (130 ft) high natural hill, which was artificially levelled to form two terraces.

=== Group A ===
Group A (also known as the West Group) occupies the lower terrace and comprises three architectural complexes. It is notable for a concentration of sculpted monuments dating to the Late Classic, and contains most of the monuments found at the site. A Terminal Classic burial was interred in an opening carved out of the bedrock beneath the plaza and was covered with limestone slabs. The burial was accompanied by a funerary offering consisting of ten ceramic vessels, among which were an incense burner, plates and bowls.

The Ballcourt is located in Plaza B. The ballcourt is aligned north–south with a playing area measuring 17 by 4 metres (56 by 13 ft). It had sloped sides and open end zones as is typical of the southeastern Petén. The side structures measure 3.4 metres (11 ft) high.

Plaza C is located to the north of Group A. It was built upon a 12-metre (39 ft) high basal platform overlooking Group A and measuring 68 by 60 metres (223 by 197 ft). The group was accessed via a stairway on the southwest side. It was first built during the Late Classic Period and underwent continuous modifications through to the Terminal Classoc. Twelve structures were built upon the basal platform, including pyramids and platform structures. The plaza has 3 structures that are laid out in a clear example of a triadic architectural complex. Two plain stelae were found in Group C.

The East Structure of Plaza C had 2 plain circular altars that were found during excavations of its facade. These altars may have been moved there from elsewhere in the city. The structure had several levels and in the Terminal Classic a cist was inserted into the upper level and closed with limestone slabs. A dedicatory offering was placed on top of it, consisting of an obsidian blade and eleven ceramic vessels. Within the cist were enclosed the remains of an adolescent together with a rich funerary offering that included 2 ceramic vessels, an alabaster vase, and a variety of ornaments, rings and beads crafted from snail shells, mother-of-pearl, greenstone and pyrite.

=== Group B ===
Group B (also known as the East Group) occupies the upper terrace. It was accessed from Group A via a 130-metre (430 ft) long causeway that measured 14 metres (46 ft) wide and was bordered by parapets. Group B consists of 9 structures built upon a single basal platform and arranged around 2 plazas, D and E.

Plaza D consists of a large traditional E-Group astronomical complex that may have been more important ritually than a similar complex in Group A. The plaza covers an area of 1,200 square metres (13,000 sq ft).

The E-Group west pyramid measures 7.4 metres (24 ft) high The east platform is lower, as is normal in such complexes in the wider Maya region, although it is considered unusual for the southeastern Petén. It stands 4 metres (13 ft) high.

Plaza E (also known as the Northeast Plaza) has a north structure that is of a similar form to the east platforms of E-Group astronomical complexes, with a small temple mounted upon the central portion of a longer platform. It is the only example of this form of architecture in the Dolores region that is not part of a formal astronomical complex.

The North Structure of Plaza E contained a large cache of Terminal Classic ceramics, including hundreds of simple plates and a variety of incense burners. The plates were all bound with vine and were likely to have been placed in the structure by traders.

=== Monuments ===
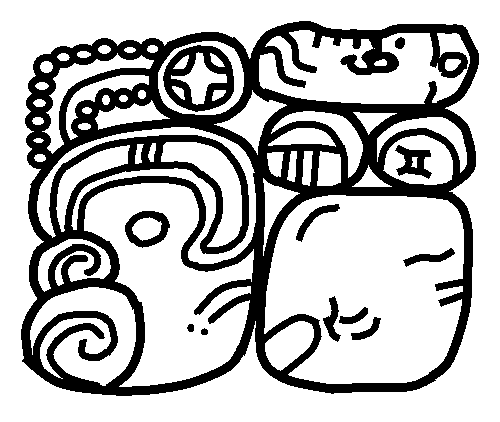
Emblem glyph of Sacul

The monuments found at Sacul include six sculpted monuments, five plain stelae and seven plain altars in the West Group. Two rows of stelae were erected in front of the East Platform of Plaza A, with five stelae in the rear row. As well as the numbered monuments listed here, various unnumbered pieces were found throughout the site, especially near the west range of the ballcourt.

Stela 1 was moved to the West Plaza during archaeological rescue operations. It was dedicated by king Ch'iyel on 9.16.10.0.0. 1 Ahau 3 Zip (17 March 761). It also bears the slightly earlier date of 9.16.8.16.1. 5 Imix 9 Pop (12 February 760). The text describes the participation of Ch'iyel in a bloodletting ceremony. Stela 1 is the earliest dated monument known from the city. It was sculpted from a fine-grained slate, and had fallen, breaking into four large fragments. The upper hieroglyphic panel has been cut away by looters.

Stela 2 was raised to commemorate the visit of king Ch'iyel to Ixkun on a date that has been reconstructed as 9.18.0.0.0. in the Long Count calendar (11 October 790) and bears portraits of the kings of both Sacul and Ixkun. The monument was found in a fallen position in Plaza A of the West Group and was associated with an altar. The monument is very similar to Stela 1 from Ixkun and depicts the two rulers facing each other and holding staves of rulership, with a prisoner in a panel beneath their feet. Stela 2 was sculpted from limestone, it is broken in two parts and is badly eroded.

Stela 3 was associated with an altar in Plaza A of the West Group and was found in a fallen position. It was found to the west of Stela 2. It is badly eroded but was sculpted with three cartouches containing hieroglyphic inscriptions. Although now largely illegible, it is evident that a number of calendrical dates were included.

Stela 4 is a plain monument fashioned from fossiliferous limestone that was in the rear row of stelae at the base of the East Platform.

Stela 5 is a plain monument that was in the rear row of stelae at the base of the East Platform. It was carved from fossiliferous limestone.

Stela 6 is in the front row of stelae at the base of the East Platform. The shaft has broken and fallen forward, leaving the stela butt in place. Stela 6 was associated with Altar 4 and was sculpted with a royal figure accompanied by a hieroglyphic text that included a Maya calendrical date. The text is badly eroded and the full date is incomplete, with just the Calendar Round day 1 Muluc 8 Zip being legible. The monument has been stylistically dated to the turn of the 9th century AD, based on its similarity to Stela 11 from Naranjo.

Stela 7 is a plain monument fashioned from slate that was in the rear row of stelae at the base of the East Platform.

Stela 8 is a plain monument made from fossiliferous limestone. It was in the rear row of stelae at the base of the East Platform.

Stela 9 is a sculpted monument in Plaza A of the West Group. It was dedicated on 11 October 790 (9.18.0.0.0. 11 Ahau 18 Mac in the Long Count), and bears the sculpted figure of king Ch'iyel. This stela was originally erected at the base of the causeway leading to the East Group but was moved in the late 20th century.

Stela 10 was dedicated in AD 800 and may be the latest monument ever erected at the city. It was found fallen at the base of Structure 7 in the northwestern portion of Plaza A and was associated with a plain altar, Altar 5. The Long Count date appears to be 9.18.10.0.0. 10 Ahau 8 Zac,. which corresponds to 19 August 800.

Stela 12 is a plain slate monument that was found in the rear row of stelae at the base of the East Platform. It is believed to have fallen from the platform itself.

Altar 1 was found close to the stub of Stela 1.

Altar 2 was associated with Stela 2.

Altar 3 was paired with Stela 3.

Altar 4 is associated with Stela 6, at the base of the East Platform of the E-Group astronomical complex in Group A.

Altar 5 is a plain monument associated with Altar 10 in the northwestern portion of Plaza A.
