= Tikal Temple V =

Major pyramid at Tikal

Coordinates: 17°13′10.77″N 89°37′25.44″W

Temple V, Tikal
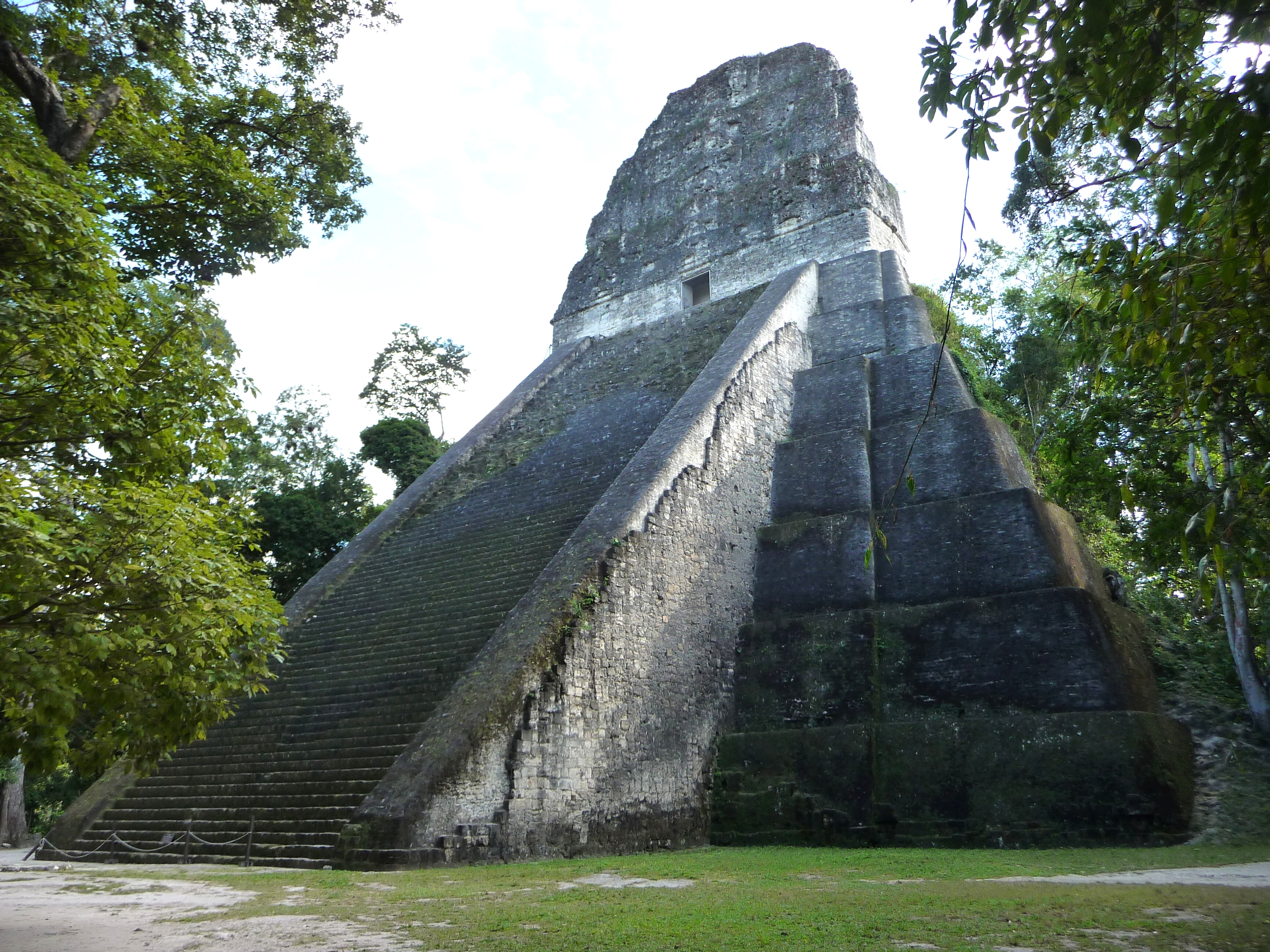
- View of Temple V in Tikal

- Location within Guatemala
- Type: Mesoamerican pyramids
- Periods: Classic-Postclassic
- Cultures: Mayan
- Location: Guatemala
- Region: Mesoamerica
- Part of: Tikal

History
- Built: c. 700 AD

Site notes
- Material: local limestone
- Height: 57 m (187 ft)
- Condition: stabilized ruin
- Public access: Yes

Tikal Temple V is the name given by archaeologists to one of the major pyramids at Tikal. Tikal is one of the most important archaeological sites of the pre-Columbian Maya civilization and is located in the Petén Department of northern Guatemala.

Temple V stands south of the Central Acropolis and is the mortuary pyramid of an as yet unidentified ruler of the once great city. The temple stands 57 metres (187 ft) high, making it the second tallest structure at Tikal—only Temple IV is taller. The temple has been dated to about AD 700, in the Late Classic period, via radiocarbon analysis and the dating of ceramics associated with the structure places its construction during the reign of Nun Bak Chak in the second half of the 7th century.

The architectural style of the pyramid includes features that were popular during the Early Classic period, such as wide balustrades flanking the main stairway and the rounded corners of the temple. These features indicate the continued influence of earlier traditions.

== Location ==
Temple V is located in the southern part of Tikal's site core, upon an east-west ridge that also supports the Lost World complex, the Plaza of the Seven Temples and the South Acropolis. In front of the artificial platform supporting the temple structure is a depression that was used as one of the city's reservoirs.

By the Late Classic, access to the temple was severely limited by the reservoir immediately to the north, by the South Acropolis to the west, by a palace complex to the east and by a natural depression in the terrain to the south. All of the other main temples at Tikal were linked to the city's network of causeways but Temple V was an exception. This may indicate that it had already been abandoned by the Late Classic and fallen into disrepair, possibly explaining Temple V's poor state of preservation when compared to the other principal temples in the city.

== The structure ==
Section	Section Height
Base Platform	3.7 m (12 ft)
1st section	3.96 m (13.0 ft)
2nd section	4.41 m (14.5 ft)
3rd section	4.40 m (14.4 ft)
4th section	4.35 m (14.3 ft)
5th section	4.30 m (14.1 ft)
6th section	4.24 m (13.9 ft)
7th section	3.30 m (10.8 ft)
shrine	9 m (30 ft)
roof comb	12.50 m (41.0 ft)

The pyramid sits upon a platform that is 5 metres (16 ft) higher than the level of the Central Plaza. The platform was built by constructing a system of compartments with sloping megalithic walls reinforced with vertical interior retaining walls, these compartments were filled with alternating layers of compacted earth and stone. This leveled off the natural terrain and allowed the platform to support the massive weight of the temple.

The base of the pyramid covers an area of approximately 2,050 square metres (22,100 sq ft). The pyramid base measures 36 metres (118 ft) north-south by 51 metres (167 ft) east-west. The temple rises in seven 4-metre (13 ft) high stepped levels with inset rounded corners, the curve having a radius of 3 metres (9.8 ft). Temple V is unique in this respect, with no other major temple at Tikal having rounded corners, although similar corners are known from a triadic temple at Caracol in Belize. The main body of the pyramid appears to have originally supported decorated mouldings although surviving examples have only been found at the corners of the building.

The main stairway measures 20 metres (66 ft) wide and rises from the north, unusually for Tikal where most of the larger temples face east or west. The stairway of the pyramid projects over 12 metres (39 ft) from the pyramid base and has about 90 steps; the balustrades of the stairway are 2.6 metres (8.5 ft) wide and rise the whole height of the stairs. At Tikal this is a feature that is usually found in buildings dating to the Early Classic.

The shrine at the top of the pyramid contains a single room of small size, measuring only 90 centimetres (35 in) deep, while the rear wall behind this tiny room measures 4.57 metres (15.0 ft) thick. The room is 3.95 metres (13.0 ft) wide and 4.4 metres (14 ft) high. This room is the smallest room of any shrine at Tikal and is the only example from the larger temples that contains only one room. Above the room are three sealed vaulted chambers, the function of which is to reduce the overall weight of the structure. The shrine still contains the original wooden lintels. The cornice of the shrine is decorated on the north side with three masks of the rain god Chaac and with frames containing human figures on the sides.

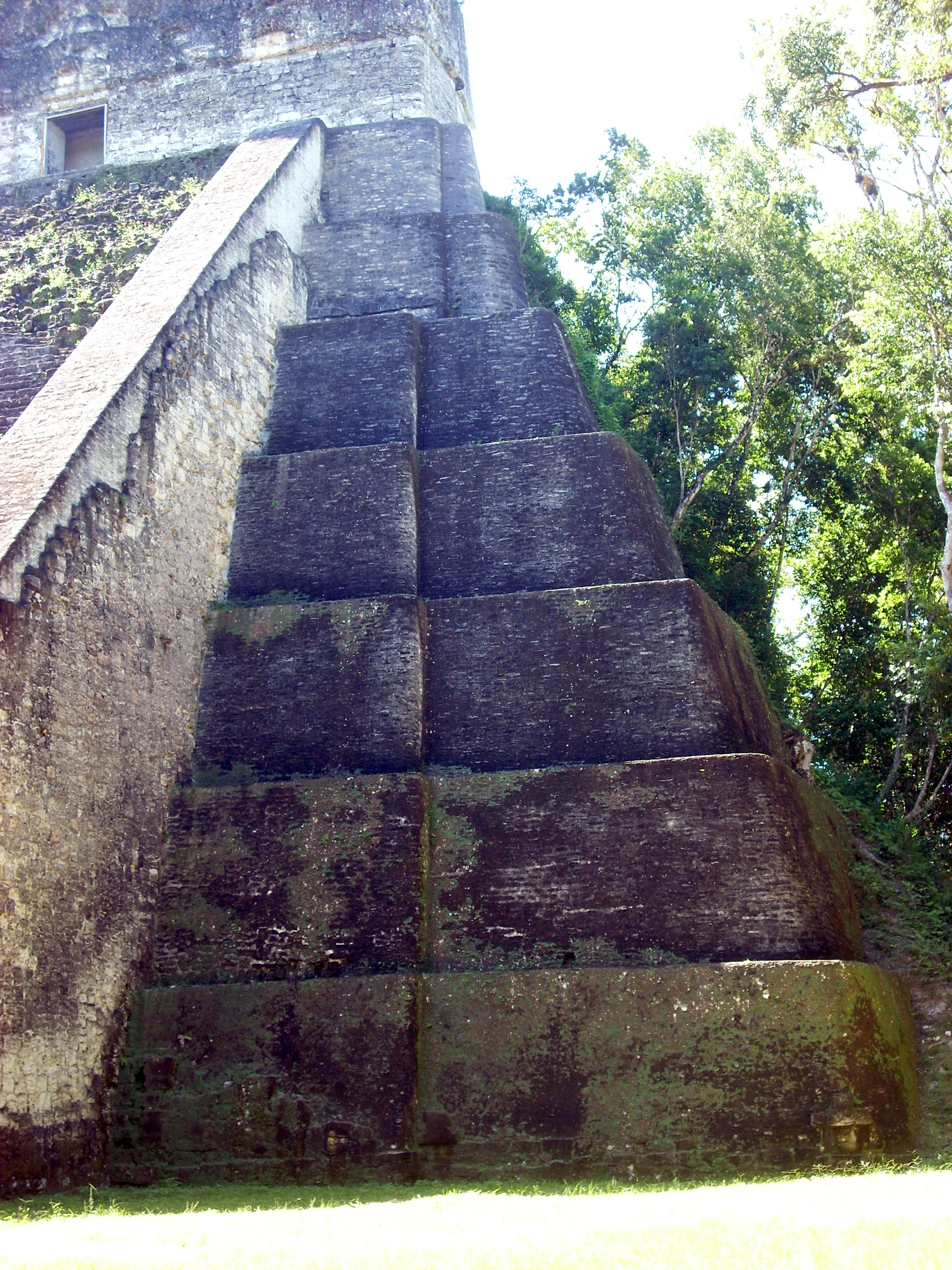
View of the northwest corner, showing the seven stepped sections.

The temple is topped by a large roof comb measuring 12.5 metres (41 ft) high. The weight of the roof comb is lessened by 11 or 12 vaulted voids. It consists of four stepped sections, although very little remains of the top section, and the surviving three sections were decorated with eight masks. The north side of the lower section displays a very large mask of Chaac; this is flanked by two masks occupying the corners of the roof comb that represent the Maya sun god.

Offering 1 was found when a test pit was sunk into the basal platform immediately to the north of the pyramid's main stairway. It consisted of two ceramic basins placed rim-to-rim one on top of the other. Inside were found an earthenware bowl and a small ceramic vessel and three shells that had been perforated to use as jewellery. The finds were all dated to the Early Classic, although they appeared to be in a Late Classic context.

Offering 2 was interred under the north-south axis of the pyramid and appears to be a dedicatory offering before construction began. It consists of five used incense burners associated with evidence of the burning of wood and incense. Two of the incense burners are cylindrical with applied masks of the sun god, with traces of red and blue paint, this were placed on either side of three effigy incense burners shaped like human figures. All are dated to the Late Classic.

Burial 1 was found interred under two unworked stones only 60 centimetres (24 in) north of Offering 1. It consisted of the skeleton of an adolescent human female aged approximately 15 years placed in a fetal position, facing to the west. Her teeth had been perforated for decorative purposes. She appeared to have died from a systemic infection that may have originated in an abscess in one of her teeth. An earthenware bowl was placed by her right knee. The burial was dated to the Late Classic.

Burial 2 was discovered when archaeologists tunneled underneath the pyramid itself. The burial was interred in a cist with two ceramic vessels placed covering the top. The cist was carved directly from the bedrock and, unusually, it was capped with planks of wood rather than the usual stone slabs. These planks were inserted into slots, indicating that they were 1.35 metres (4.4 ft) long and 20 centimetres (7.9 in) thick. The cist itself measured 0.5 by 0.7 metres (1.6 by 2.3 ft) by 0.35 metres (1.1 ft) deep. The cist was not located under the central axis of the pyramid but rather under the central axis of the summit shrine, indicating that the builders had detailed paper construction plans providing precise measurements, allowing them to calculate exactly where to bury the deceased. The burial was accompanied by funerary offerings that included an earthenware bowl containing a ceramic incense burner that were placed on top of the wooden lid closing the cist.

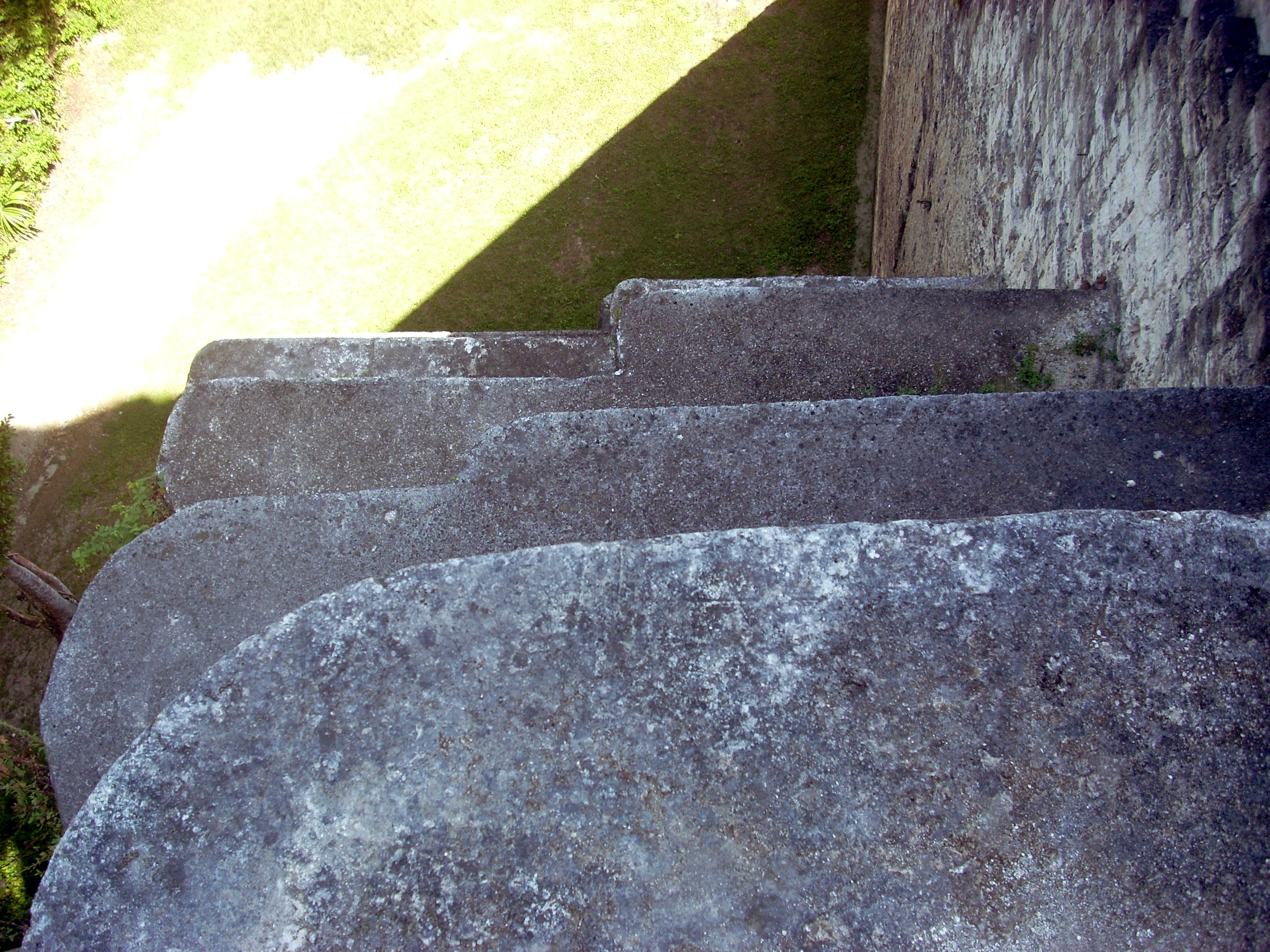
The northwest corner from above, showing the inset rounded corners

The remains were those of a young adult male, between 18 and 22 years of age. His height was calculated from an intact femur as 1.62 metres (5.3 ft), which is 5 centimetres (2.0 in) taller than the average for an adult male in the Late Classic. The skull of the deceased was elongated, having been subject to artificial cranial deformation and his teeth had been filed and perforated. Any decoration inserted into the perforations of the upper jaw had fallen out but the lower canines still contained pyrite incrustations. He appeared to have enjoyed general good health during his life except for a bout of childhood anemia. The bones had been disarticulated before burial and many of the smaller bones were missing, for instance some bones from the hands and the spine. In the opinion of the excavator, it is unlikely that the remains were those of a human sacrifice specifically in order to dedicate to the temple, since there were few signs of cutmarks on the bones.

Burial 2 is believed to have been interred after the artificial leveling of the terrain and prior to the construction of the pyramid itself. The cist contained ashes at the bottom and small fragments of carbon, evidence of a ritual performed before the human remains were deposited inside and the pyramid was built. On top of this was deposited a 2 inches (5.1 cm) layer of brown dust that is believed to be all that remains of a wooden box used to contain the human remains. The date of burial is estimated as AD 600–650, based on the accompanying ceramics and is not believed to be that of a ruler due to the relatively poor offering accompanying it.

== History ==
Temple V was one of the greatest construction projects undertaken at Tikal during the Late Classic period. It is believed by some investigators to be the funerary temple of the eldest son of Jasaw Chan Kʼawiil I who is presumed to have died shortly after taking power in AD 734. This is not universally accepted however. Excavations of the platform have revealed activity dating back as far as the Early Classic and that construction began between AD 550 and 650. The temple was built in one construction phase and was not superimposed upon an earlier building.

Investigating archaeologist Oswaldo Gómez has theorized that the temple was dedicated to the rain god Chaac, or was the funerary monument of a ruler who greatly venerated Chaac, based upon the presence of six large Chaac masks upon the roof comb and the placement of the temple with its unusual northward orientation facing directly onto the greatest source of water in the city.

== Modern history ==
Although Temple V is one of the largest buildings in the site core, it was largely overlooked in the 20th century, perhaps due in part to its apparent lack of hieroglyphic inscriptions. Due to its poor preservation and its continuing decay, in 1987 Temple V was included on a list of planned works by the Proyecto Nacional Tikal.

Temple V was the first temple to be discovered by Modesto Méndez, the governor of Petén, on the first expedition to the ruins. From a reexamination of Méndez' account, it appears he climbed the pyramid on 26 February 1848 and was able to discern the other major temples from its summit.

Alfred P. Maudslay visited Tikal in 1881 and photographed the north face of Temple V, which he denominated as Temple D. He also briefly described the interior of the summit shrine. Teoberto Maler arrived at the ruins in 1894 and it was he who renamed the pyramid as Great Temple V. Maudslay also wrote a fuller description of the structure. Both Maudslay and Maler had the pyramid cleared of vegetation during their investigations. Alfred Tozzer arrived at the site in 1911 and surveyed the ruins; he was the first to record the temple simply as Temple V. After Tozzer's visit the rainforest was allowed to reclaim the structure.

In 1965 Christopher Jones of the University of Pennsylvania carried out investigations at the base of the stairway in an unsuccessful search for two monuments reported by Teoberto Maler in the 19th century. A few years later, in 1968, Miguel Orrego carried out further investigations of the temple. In 1987 and again in 1991 rescue work was undertaken upon the roof comb by the Proyecto Nacional Tikal to repair damage caused by a hole that allowed visitors to climb through onto the crest of the building. Further investigations of the temple were started in November 1995 by Oswaldo Gómez.

== See also ==
- El Castillo, Chichen Itza
- List of Mesoamerican pyramids
- Pyramid of the Magician at Uxmal
- Temple of the Inscriptions at Palenque
- Tikal Temple I
- Tikal Temple II
- Tikal Temple III
- Tikal Temple IV
- Tikal Temple VI
- List of tallest structures built before the 20th century
