= Tikal Temple I =

Mesoamerican pyramid in Guatemala

Temple of the Great Jaguar
- El Gran Jaguar, Temple of Ah Cacao
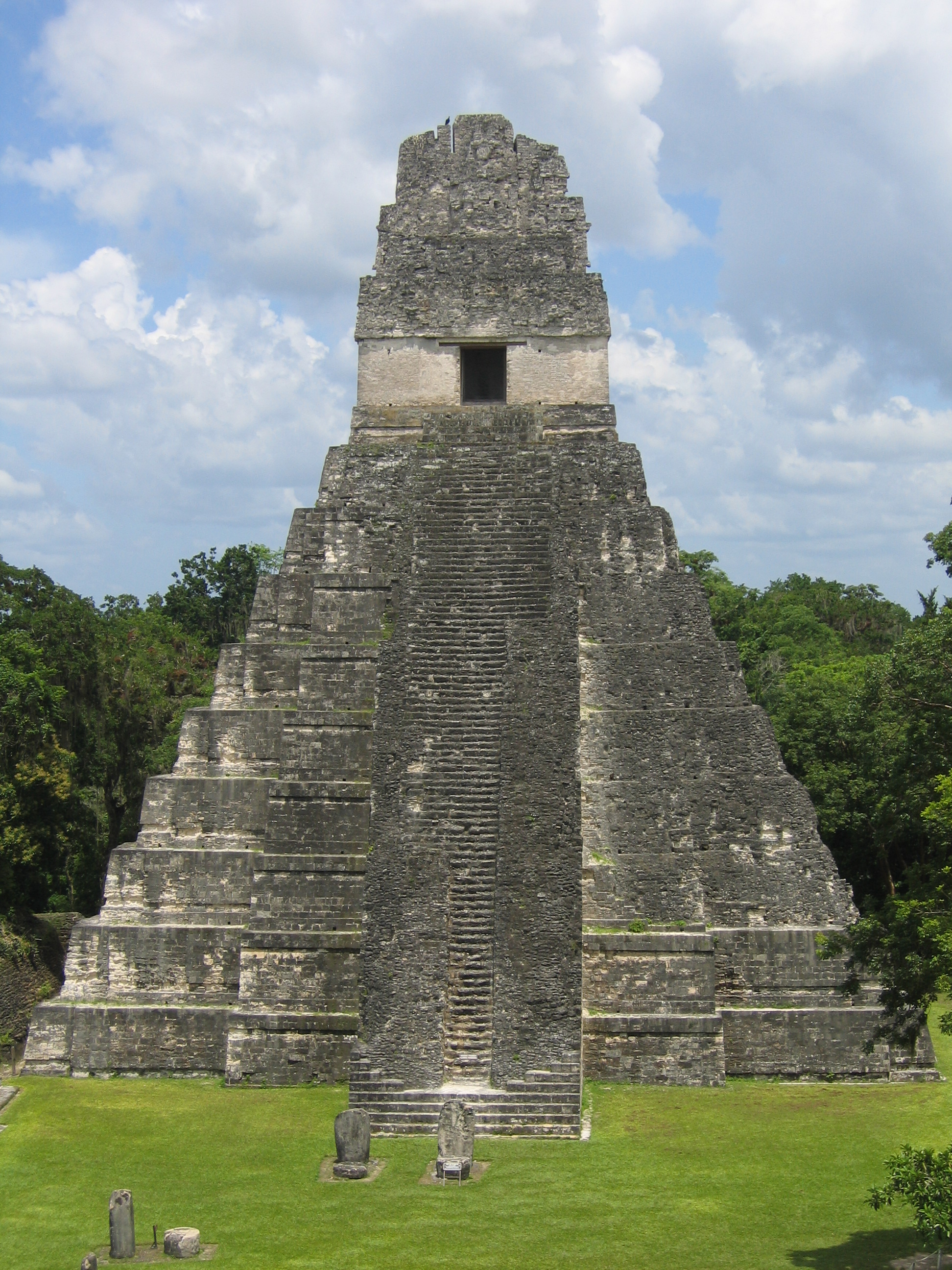
- Temple I viewed across the main plaza from Temple II

- Location within Guatemala
- 17.221944°N 89.622778°W
- Type: Mesoamerican pyramids
- Periods: Classic-Postclassic
- Cultures: Mayan
- Location: Guatemala
- Region: Mesoamerica
- Part of: Tikal

History
- Built: c. 732 AD
- Built by: Jasaw Chan Kʼawiil I (other names) Ah Cacao, King Moon Double Comb
- Abandoned: c. 1450

Site notes
- Material: local limestone
- Height: 47 m (154 ft)
- Excavation dates: 1955–1964
- Archaeologists: Aubrey Trik; George Guillemin
- Condition: stabilized ruin
- Public access: Yes

UNESCO World Heritage Site
- Official name: Tikal National Park
- Type: Mixed
- Criteria: i, iii, iv, ix, x
- Designated: 1979 (3rd session)
- Reference no.: 64
- Region: Latin America and the Caribbean

Tikal Temple I is the designation given to one of the major structures at Tikal, one of the largest cities and archaeological sites of the pre-Columbian Maya civilization in Mesoamerica. It is located in the Petén Basin region of northern Guatemala. It also is known as the Temple of the Great Jaguar because of a lintel that represents a king sitting upon a jaguar throne. An alternative name is the Temple of Ah Cacao, after the ruler buried in the temple. (Note: Ah Cacao being an earlier nickname for the Tikal ruler Jasaw Chan K'awiil I, whose tomb the temple contains.) Temple I is a typically Petén-styled limestone stepped pyramid structure that is dated to approximately 732 AD.

Situated at the heart of a World Heritage Site, the temple is surmounted by a characteristic roof comb, a distinctive Maya architectural feature. Building Temple I on the eastern side of the Great Plaza was a significant deviation from the established tradition of building funerary temples just north of the plaza in Tikal's North Acropolis.

== Structure ==
The structure is a funerary temple associated with Jasaw Chan Kʼawiil I, a Classic Period ruler of the polity based at Tikal, who ruled from AD 682–734. The tomb of this ruler has been located by archaeologists deep within the structure, the tomb having been built first with the temple being raised over it. Construction of both were overseen by Jasaw Chan K'awiil's son and heir Yik' in Chan K'awiil. Jasaw Chan K'awiil probably planned the building of the temple long before his death. The temple rises in nine stepped levels, which may be symbolic of the nine levels of the underworld. The temple has grooved moldings and inset corners. A steep staircase climbs the temple to the summit shrine.

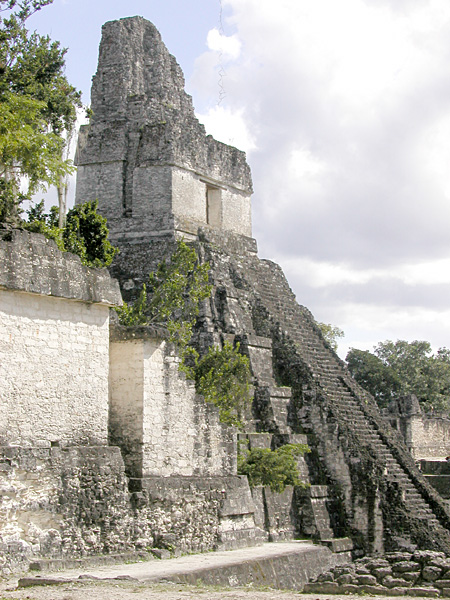
Temple I, seen from the northwest

The temple rises 55 meters (180 ft) over the Great Plaza. The pyramid is topped by a funerary shrine, containing finely carved wooden lintels, the execution of which probably was overseen by Jasaw Chan K'awiil as part of his plans for his funerary monument. The lintels were carved from sapodilla wood and one of them, Lintel 3, once was painted red. Sapodilla (Manilkara zapota) is a very hard red-brown wood available locally. The lintels were formed from planks of this wood set into small niches fashioned into the walls forming the three doorways; the outermost lintel was smooth, but the central lintel was carved intricately from four planks. Two of these planks were removed in the nineteenth century and their location now is unknown. The other two were removed by the British explorer John Boddam-Whetham and donated to the British Museum in London. The scene carved onto one lintel shows a seated figure with an enormous serpent rising above him.

The shrine bears a high roof comb decorated with a sculpture of the seated king, Jasaw Chan K'awiil, although it now is difficult to discern. The roof comb consists of two parallel structures with an enclosed, vaulted hollow between them, which reduces the weight of the construction,. The weight of this heavy superstructure is borne through the spine of the temple. The front of the roof comb was finished with stone blocks carved to represent the enormous figure of the king, flanked by scrolls and serpents. It originally supported molded plaster decoration as well. The shrine contains three narrow, dark chambers that were accessible only through a single doorway. The three rooms were arranged one behind the other, and had high corbel-vaulted ceilings, braced by wooden beams. The beams were fashioned from sapodilla, the wood that was used in the lintels.

Temple I was reused in the Postclassic Period. The Late Classic burial shaft was reopened apparently, and a new burial made inside. The offerings accompanying the new burial included censers of a type found in Mayapán and two ceramic types that were widespread in Petén during the Postclassic. The type of censer associated with the new burial was not used after the fifteenth century.

== Royal tomb ==
The tomb of Jasaw Chan K'awiil I was discovered by archaeologists in 1962. It was entered through the roof of the tomb after exploratory tunneling from the bottom of the temple stairway. The tomb has been labeled as Burial 116 by archaeologists. It is a large vaulted chamber deep within the pyramid, below the level of the Great Plaza. Over half of the chamber is occupied by the masonry bench supporting the king's body and his jewelry. The king's remains had been laid on a woven mat and the tomb contained rich offerings of jaguar skins, jadeite objects, painted ceramics, rare spondylus shells, pearls, mirrors, and other works of art. The body of the king was covered with large quantities of jade ornaments including an enormous necklace with 114 especially large beads, as depicted in sculpted portraits of the king, and weighing 3.9 kilograms (8.6 lb).

One of the outstanding pieces recovered from the tomb was an ornate jade mosaic vessel with the lid bearing a sculpted portrait of the king. Also accompanying the burial was a series of 37 finely carved human bones bearing inscribed hieroglyphic texts, arranged in a pile by the king's right foot. One refers to Tikal's allies, including Copán and Palenque; others include the king's name and parentage. One contains a carved portrait of a captive, Ox Ha Te Ixil, who was a vassal of Tikal's great enemy Calakmul. There also are scenes that show the maize deity being carried to the underworld in a canoe. One of the bones contains a lengthy list of the death dates of foreign nobles.

== Modern history ==
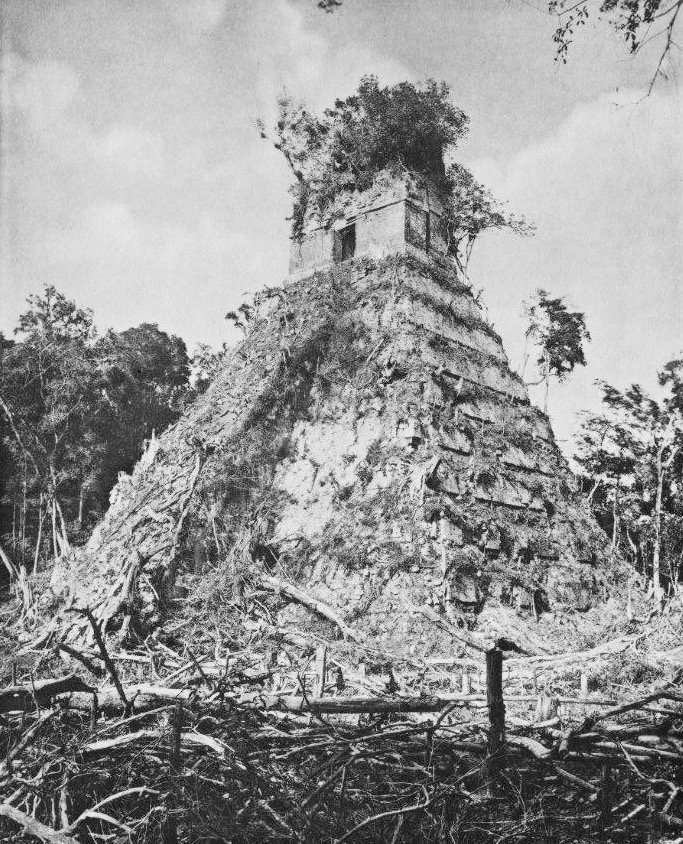
The temple in 1896, after the site was first surveyed

Tikal was re-discovered in 1848. In 1877 various pieces were looted from the major temples at Tikal, including pieces of Temple I. Alfred P. Maudslay first mapped the centre of Tikal in 1881–1882, marking the five major temples on his sketch, including Temple I, although he named the major temples alphabetically, ranging from A through to E. Teoberto Maler carried out the first topographical survey of the site in 1895, naming Temple I as the "First Great Temple". Alfred Tozzer carried out another survey in 1911 and generally followed Maler's naming conventions; it was he who abbreviated the name to Temple I.

In 1955, the University of Pennsylvania began its Tikal Project, carrying out archaeological investigations of the ruins and preparing them to be opened for tourism, which included work on Temple I and Temple II. The project was overseen by Aubrey Trik and George Guillemin. The tomb under the temple was not discovered until 1962, by Trik. The work on Temple I lasted until 1964.

In 1986 the Proyecto Nacional Tikal (PRONAT) carried out repairs to cracks in the roof of the temple.

As part of the 2012 phenomenon, modern Maya held a fire ceremony on 21 December 2012 at dawn in the main plaza in front of the temple. Guatemalan and foreign priests led the ceremony, asking for unity, peace and the end of discrimination and racism, with the hope that the new cycle that begins will be a "new dawn" for them. About 3,000 people participated in the event.

== See also ==
- Tikal Temple II
- Tikal Temple III
- Tikal Temple IV
- Tikal Temple V
- List of tallest structures built before the 20th century
