= CyArk =

Non-profit organization in California, US

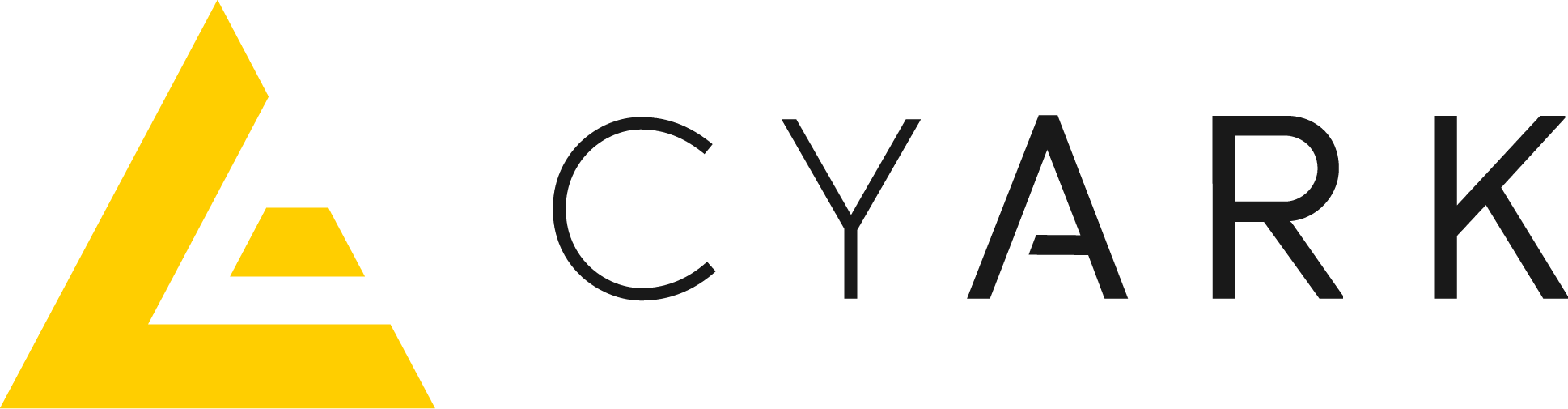
- Formation: 2003
- Founder: Ben Kacyra
- Purpose: Digital documentation of cultural heritage sites and architecture
- Headquarters: Oakland, California
- Products: CyArk 3D Heritage Archive
- Methods: Laser scanning, digital modeling
- Website: cyark.org

CyArk (from "cyber archive") is a 501(c)(3) nonprofit organization located in Oakland, California, United States founded in 2003. CyArk's mission is to "digitally record, archive and share the world's most significant cultural heritage and ensure that these places continue to inspire wonder and curiosity for decades to come."

CyArk's founder, Ben Kacyra, stated during his speech at the 2011 TED Conference that the organization was created in response to increasing human and natural threats to heritage sites, and to ensure the "collective human memory" is not lost while making it available through modern dissemination tools like the internet and mobile platforms.

The organization is known for its work with a number of partners in producing high-quality digital scanning of World Heritage Sites, such as Angkor Wat, Pompeii, Chichen Itza, the Eastern Qing tombs, Nineveh, the Antonine Wall, Mount Rushmore, and many others.

== History ==
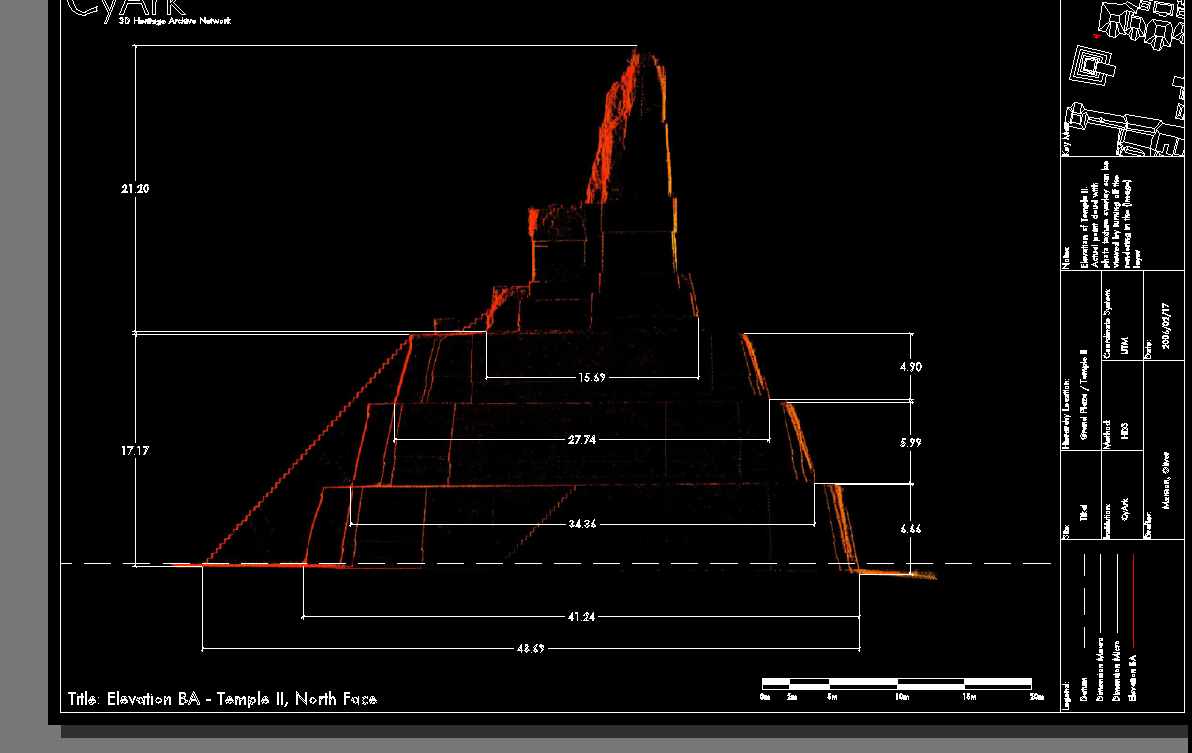
Profile of Tikal Temple II

CyArk was founded in 2003 by Iraqi expatriate and civil engineer Ben Kacyra. In the 1990s, Kacyra was instrumental in the invention and marketing of the first truly portable laser scanner. The scanner, called the Cyrax, was designed for surveying purposes, and was produced by Cyra Technologies.

In 2001, Cyra Technologies and all rights to the invention were sold to the Swiss firm Leica Geosystems.

After sale of the company, Ben Kacyra dedicated his energy to using the new technology to document archaeological and cultural heritage resources, and to the CyArk organization.

CyArk's primary focus has been the digital documentation of threatened ancient and historical architecture. This architecture includes sites such as Colorado's Mesa Verde, Italy's Pompeii, Wyoming's Fort Laramie, and Kacyra's native Mosul in Iraq – also known as the biblical Assyrian city of Nineveh.

CyArk has generated a fairly large amount of publicity since its inception. Initially, this was in part due to the relevance of Kacyra's life story to the ongoing Iraq War, during which much of the country's cultural patrimony was destroyed amidst a spasm of looting and heavy military damage to important historical sites such as Babylon and Samarra. As the public face of the CyArk organization, Ben Kacyra became a popular speaker at conferences such as Google's Zeitgeist (2008), and TEDGlobal (2011), describing his life story and the potential of digital preservation to save the "collective treasure" of global heritage. In recent years, however, he has taken on more of an advisory role, while the independent non-profit organization CyArk has gathered considerable momentum.

As of 2014, CyArk has become a major entity in the historic preservationist and cultural resource/heritage management communities. The 2014 CyArk 500 Annual Summit was held at the National Archives Building in Washington, D.C. The theme was "Democratising cultural heritage: Enabling access to information, technology and support."

== Project focus ==
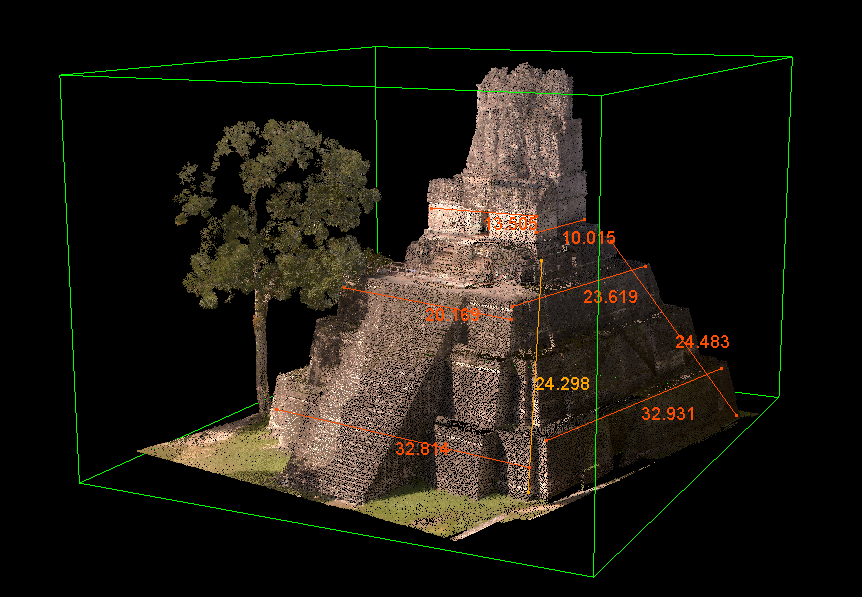
3-dimensional projection of Tikal Temple II

CyArk seeks to help preserve heritage sites around the world through utilizing digital documentation to support the work of heritage managers and further connect people with the history of these sites. According to the site's website, they work across three principal areas: conservation, recovery, and discovery.

CyArk's digital data may be useful for professionals monitoring and managing gradual architectural deterioration at cultural sites. This data could also make it possible to generate blueprints for reconstruction following catastrophic events, such as the Afghan Taliban's notorious demolition of the Bamiyan Buddhas in 2001 or the 2010 destruction by suspected arson of the Royal Tombs of Kasubi, Uganda. The Kasubi Tombs were digitally preserved by CyArk a year before their demise, providing a lasting digital record and potential blueprint for reconstruction.

In 2019, CyArk launched an online archival platform called Open Heritage 3D in partnership with Historic Environment Scotland and the University of South Florida to make digital data of heritage sites available to download online for people to use for educational purposes. Since 2022 this project has since been run in partnership with the Cultural Heritage Engineering Initiative (CHEI) at UC San Diego's Qualcomm Institute.

According to CyArk's online mission statement, the dissemination of free digital content about heritage sites can help encourage additional visits by tourists, and invigorate communities with revenue from cultural tourism. Youth and educators will benefit from free, publicly accessible historical and site information, including some Creative Commons-licensed content. And finally, the creation of digital records ensures not only that the sites will never be lost forever; it also provides a digital resource to facilitate the continued mining of information over time as technologies and methods of information extraction evolve.

== Selected list of projects ==
- Ancient Merv, a major crossroads along the ancient silk road in Turkmenistan
- Ancient Thebes and the Ramesseum/Necropolis of Ramses II, Egypt
- Angkor Wat's western causeway and Banteay Kdei areas, Cambodia
- The Bab al-Barqiyya Gate, a portion of the Ayyubid Wall in Cairo, Egypt (See: Bab al-Barqiyya)
- Bagan, the political, economic, and cultural center of the Bagan Kingdom
- A Carmelite Church in Weissenburg, Germany
- Beauvais Cathedral, a Gothic masterwork in France
- Chavin De Huantar, 3500-year-old capital of the Chavin culture, Peru
- Chichen Itza, ancient Yucatán Maya center and pilgrimage site, Mexico
- Deadwood, the legendary Old West city in South Dakota, United States
- Fort Conger, a 19th-century Arctic exploration camp located on Northeastern Ellesmere Island, Nunavut, Canada.
- Fort Laramie, historic center of the Plains Indian Wars and the Oregon Trail, United States
- The Hypogeum of the Volumnis, an intact Etruscan tomb near Perugia, Italy
- Mesa Verde's Spruce Tree House, Square Tower House, and Fire Temple, ancestral Puebloan cliff structures in Colorado, United States
- Mexico City Metropolitan Cathedral, one of the most significant religious sites in Mexico
- Monte Albán, the capital of the ancient Zapotecs of Oaxaca, Mexico
- Nineveh Region Nineveh, imperial capital of the Assyrian Empire, Iraq
- Piazza Del Duomo's Baptistery, Cathedral, and Campanile (also known as the Leaning Tower of Pisa), Italy
- Pompeii, ancient Roman city buried under the volcanic eruption of Mt. Vesuvius, Italy. The CyArk website states that this project was also the first time laser scanning was used to document a cultural heritage site.
- Qal’at al-Bahrain, a 14th-century Portuguese fort built atop the remains of the ancient Dilmun civilization's hilltop capitol, Bahrain
- Rani ki vav, the largest stepwell in India, in the town of Patan, Gujarat
- Rapa Nui (Easter Island), scans of the famous monuments and lesser-known structures of this very isolated Polynesian culture site, Chile
- Royal Kasubi Tombs, culturally vital mausoleum of the last four Bugandan Kings, Uganda. The Tombs were scanned and documented by CyArk in 2009 then largely destroyed by a fire in 2010, and data from the scans will be used for reconstruction efforts.
- Church and Cloister of Saint-Trophime, a former cathedral in Arles, France that contains some of the world's most notable Romanesque facades
- The Pelourinho of Salvador da Bahia, historic downtown district of Brazil's original capitol
- Stone Bridge of Regensburg, 800-year-old bridge across the Danube, Germany
- Stonewall National Monument, a significant site in LGBTQ rights movement
- Tambo Colorado, an adobe-built strategic center of the ancient Inca empire, Peru
- Thomas Jefferson Memorial, a monument to the 3rd president of the United States located on the National Mall in Washington DC
- Tikal, one of the most important and longest-occupied cities of the ancient Maya world, Guatemala

The CyArk website also offers a world map of the hazards which global heritage sites face, such as earthquakes and sea level rise due to global warming.

== Funding and partnerships ==
Initially, CyArk was fully supported by the Kacyra family and their Kacyra Family Foundation.

CyArk is now primarily funded through individual project funding, corporate in-kind support, and foundation grants/donations. Corporate funders as of 2014 include Microsoft, IBM, Iron Mountain, Autodesk, and Trimble Navigation.

CyArk has also established working relationships with project partners in engineering, media, and academia, including Christofori und Partner and PBS. At UC Berkeley, the organization coordinated an internship program with the department of Anthropology in 2006–2007. CyArk is currently an approved work-study employer for Cal students.

As of October 2011, the already-existing partnerships with the United States' National Park Service (NPS), the United Kingdom's Historic Scotland (HS), World Monuments Fund, and Mexico's Instituto Nacional de Antropología y Historia (INAH) had been greatly expanded, with upcoming projects that include Mexico's Teotihuacan, Scotland's Rosslyn Chapel, Iraq's Babylon, and the U.S.' Mount Rushmore National Memorial.
