= Yax Nuun Ayiin =

Yax Nuun Ayiin (formerly sometimes written Nun Yax Ayin) is the name of two ruling personages deciphered from the inscriptions of the Maya civilization site of Tikal:

- Yax Nuun Ayiin I (died 411), a.k.a. "Curl Snout" (reigned 379–ca. 410); Early Classic period ruler of Tikal, 16th ruler in succession counted from the founder
- Yax Nuun Ayiin II, a.k.a. "Ruler C" (reigned 768–ca. 794); Late Classic period ruler of Tikal, 29th ruler in succession counted from the founder
