= Tikal Temple III =

Temple in Tikal

Coordinates: 17°13′19.49″N 89°37′33.84″W

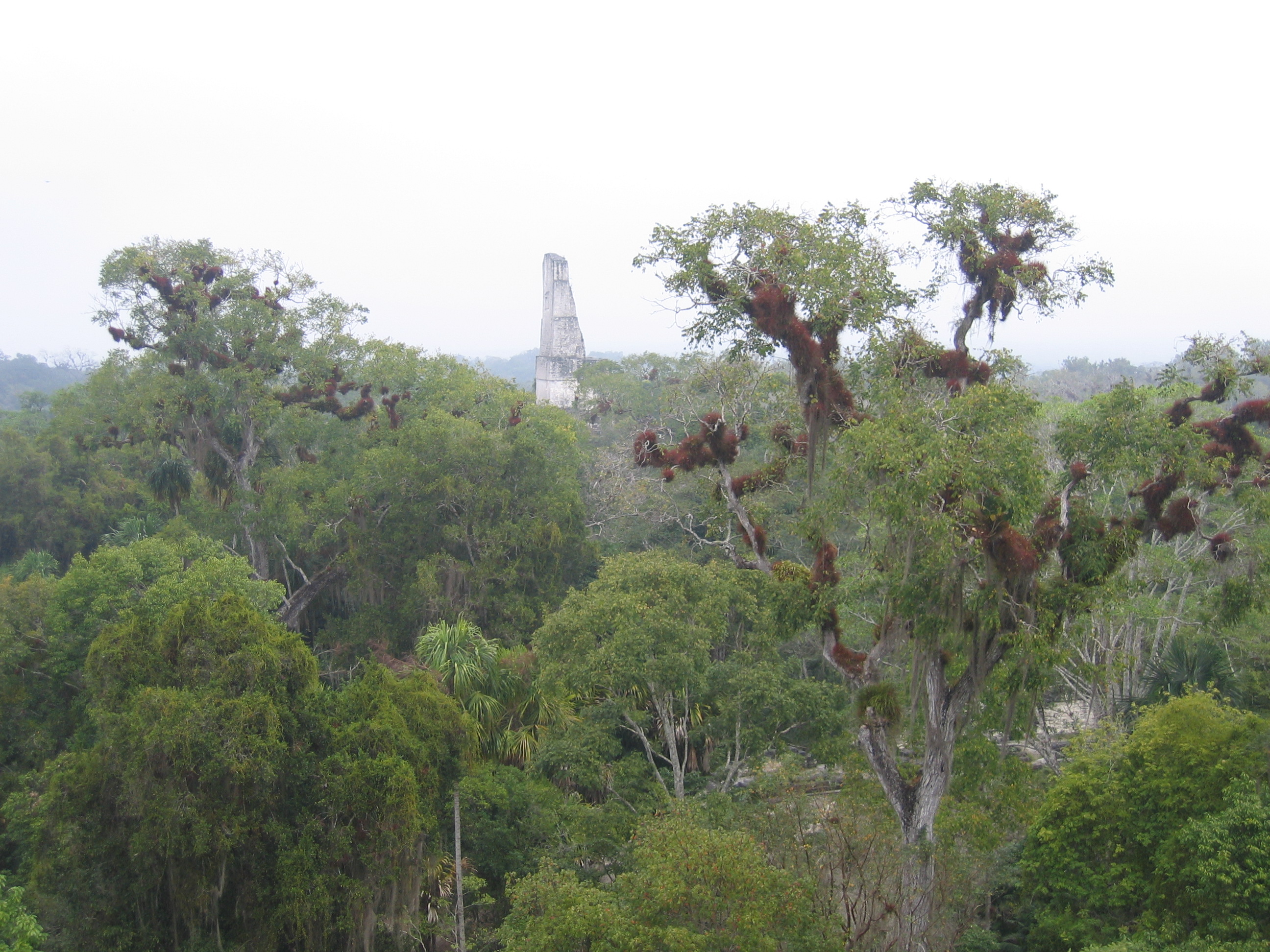
The roof comb of Temple III standing above the forest canopy

Tikal Temple III, also known as the Temple of the Jaguar Priest, was one of the principal temple pyramids at the ancient Maya city of Tikal, in the Petén Department of modern Guatemala. The temple stands approximately 55 metres (180 ft) tall. The summit shrine of Temple III differs from those of the other major temples at Tikal in that it only possesses two rooms instead of the usual three. The pyramid was built in the Late Classic Period, and has been dated to 810 AD using the hieroglyphic text on Stela 24, which was raised at the base of its access stairway. Stela 24 is paired with the damaged Altar 6, in a typical stela-altar pair.

Temple III is associated with the little-known king Dark Sun, and it is likely that Temple III is Dark Sun's funerary temple. The construction of Temple III indicated that Tikal was still politically stable at the beginning of the 9th century AD. However, this was the last temple pyramid raised at Tikal and by the end of the 9th century the city had fallen into ruin.

Temple III is only partially restored and is closed to the public; it has not been the subject of archaeological investigation.

== The structure ==
Temple III is immediately south of the Tozzer Causeway and faces eastwards towards the Great Plaza. The inner doorway separating the two chambers of the summit shrine supports a finely sculpted lintel representing an obese figure wrapped in a jaguar skin. This is one of only two sculpted lintels at Tikal that are still in their original setting. One of the other lintels is on exhibition at the National Museum of Guatemalan Art.

The temple structure was restored in 1967 and 1969 by the Tikal Project of the University Museum of the University of Pennsylvania, concentrating upon the summit shrine and the roof comb. The pyramid body itself was not restored but is known to have nine stepped levels and an east-facing access stairway.

The roof comb and the outer chamber of the summit shrine have suffered lightning damage, causing a 10-centimetre (3.9 in) wide crack in the eastern wall of the corbel vaulting.

== See also ==
- El Castillo, Chichen Itza
- Pyramid of the Magician at Uxmal
- Temple of the Inscriptions at Palenque
- Tikal Temple I
- Tikal Temple II
- Tikal Temple IV
- Tikal Temple V
- List of tallest structures built before the 20th century
