= Tikal Temple VI =

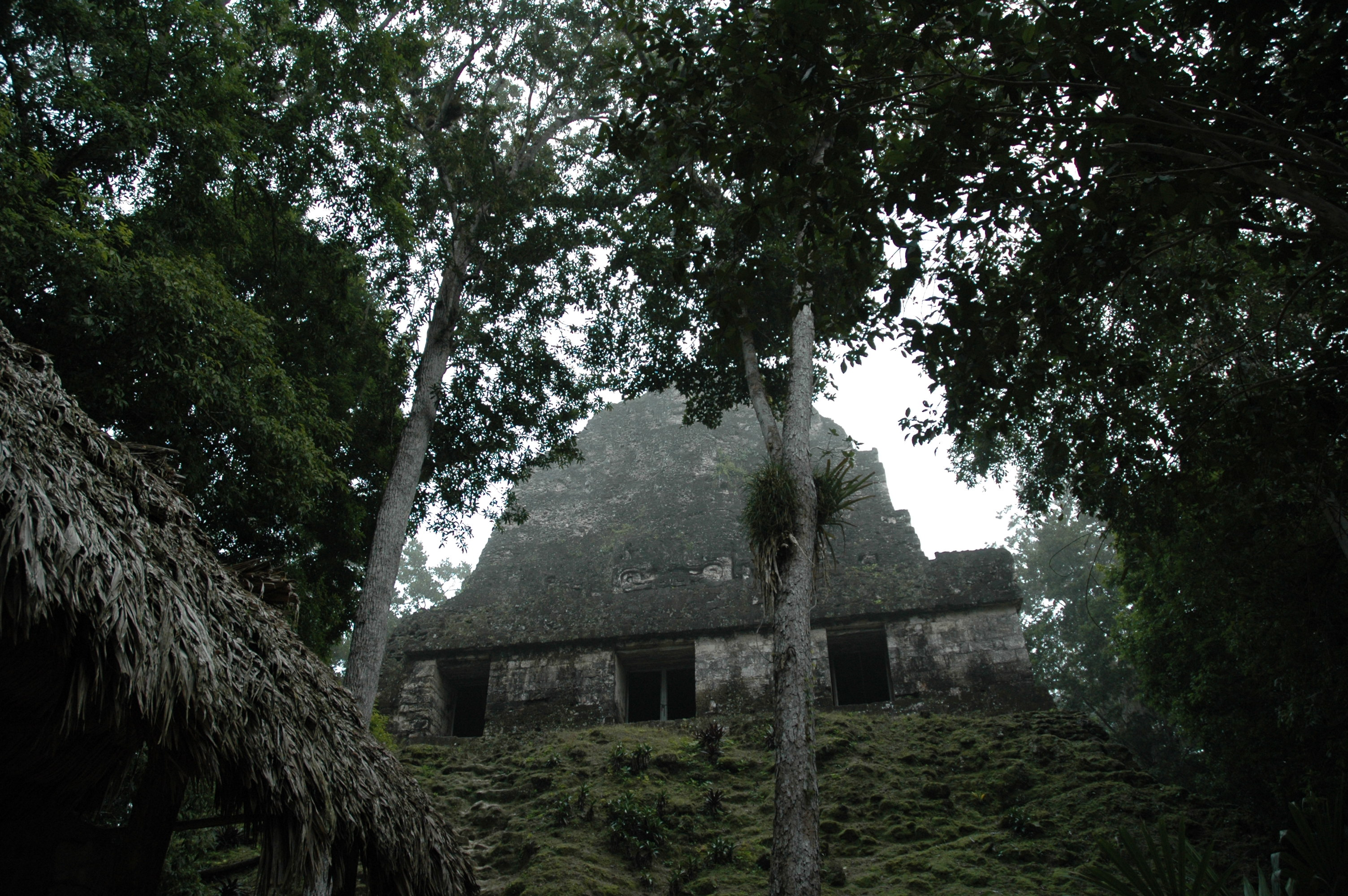
The summit of Temple VI

Tikal Temple VI (also known as the Temple of the Inscriptions and Structure 6F-27) is a Mesoamerican pyramid in the ruins of the major Maya city of Tikal, in the Petén department of northern Guatemala. Temple VI is located at the southeastern end of the Mendez Causeway, which links the temple plaza with the site core. The temple faces west onto a walled plaza. The existence of the temple was first reported in 1951 by Antonio Ortiz on behalf of the Instituto de Antropología e Historia (IDAEH - "Institute of Anthropology and History"). The roof comb of the temple is inscribed on its sides and back with a lengthy hieroglyphic text. The pyramid's summit superstructure contains two chambers, and the highest surviving portion of the temple's roof comb stands 12 metres (40 ft) high. The pyramid superstructure is accessed via three west-facing doorways. The triple doorway and interior layout of the chambers suggest that Temple VI was in fact a palace-type structure rather than a temple.

== Hieroglyphic inscription ==
The text contains a history of Tikal stretching back into the Preclassic period. The earliest date in the text equates to 1139 BC; it records either a mythical foundation event or, perhaps, a distantly remembered historical event of importance.

== Monuments ==
Stela 21 was erected at the foot of Temple VI. It records the succession of king Yik'in Chan K'awiil in AD 734. When found the stela had fallen from its original position and was re-erected during restoration work. Only the bottom section of the stela survives. Some text survives on the left hand side of the front of the monument; it is of excellent quality workmanship and records a date in AD 736. A part of the stela was reused and fashioned into a metate that was found by locals 0.3 kilometres (0.19 mi) northwest of the temple.

Altar 9 is paired with Stela 21 at the foot of the pyramid steps. The altar is badly damaged and is missing large fragments. The upper face of the altar was sculpted with the image of a face-down bound captive.
