= Tikal Temple II =

Mesoamerican pyramid in Guatemala

Coordinates: 17°13′20″N 89°37′27″W

Temple II, Tikal
- Temple of the Masks
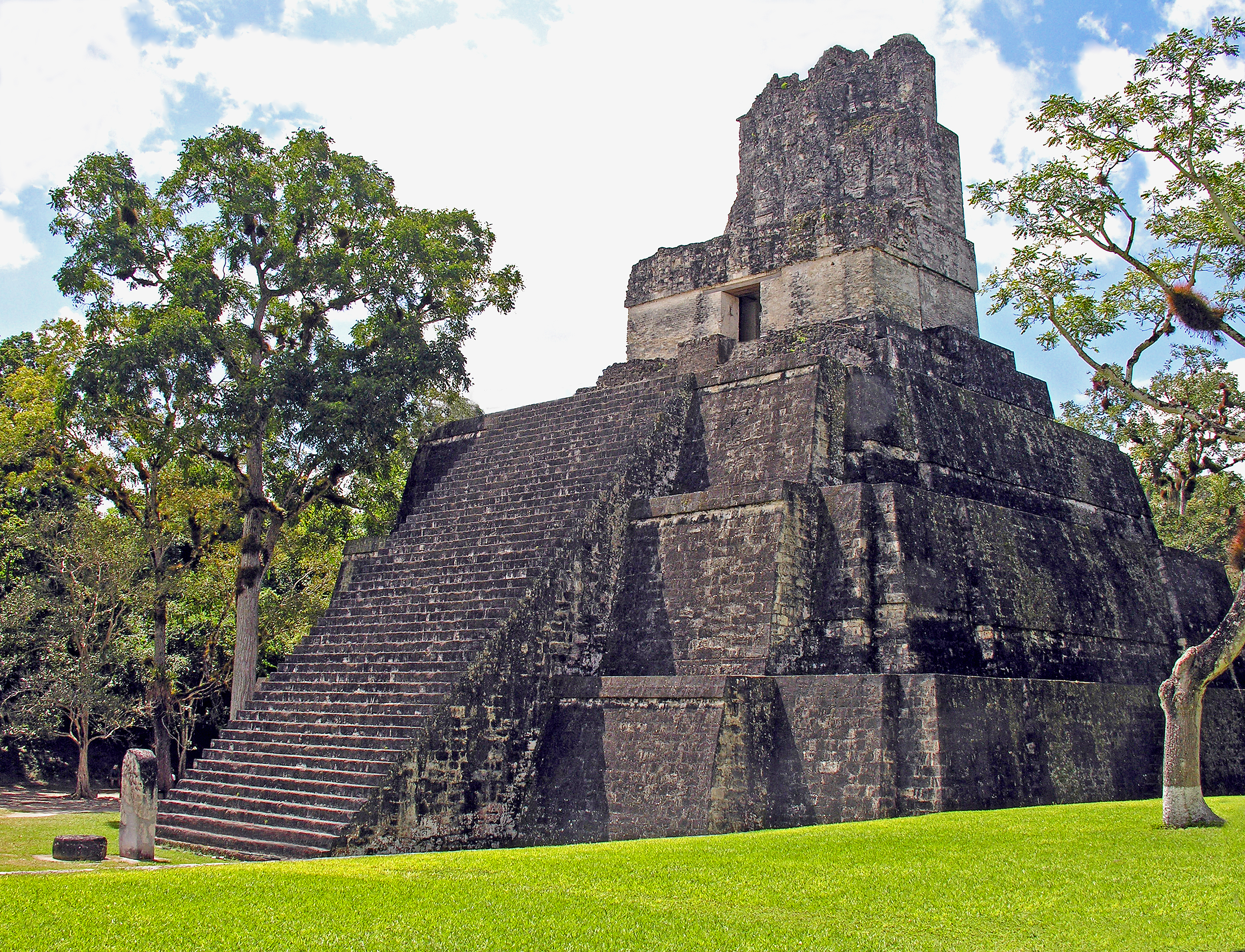
- View of Temple II in the archaeological complex of Tikal

- Location within Guatemala
- Type: Mesoamerican pyramids
- Periods: Classic-Postclassic
- Cultures: Mayan
- Location: Guatemala
- Region: Mesoamerica
- Part of: Tikal

History
- Built: c. 700 AD
- Built by: Jasaw Chan Kʼawiil I (other names) Ah Cacao, King Moon Double Comb

Site notes
- Material: local limestone
- Height: 38 m (125 ft)
- Excavation dates: 1955–1964
- Archaeologists: Aubrey Trik; George Guillemin
- Condition: stabilized ruin
- Public access: Yes

Tikal Temple II (or the Temple of the Masks, alternatively labelled by archaeologists as Tikal Structure 5D-2) is a Mesoamerican pyramid at the Maya archaeological site of Tikal in the Petén Department of northern Guatemala. The temple was built in the Late Classic Period in a style reminiscent of the Early Classic. Temple II is located on the west side of the Great Plaza, opposite Temple I. Temple II was built by the king Jasaw Chan Kʼawiil I in honour of his wife, Lady Lahan Unen Moʼ. Temple II had a single wooden sculpted lintel that bears the portrait of a royal woman who may have been the wife of Jasaw Chan K'awiil I, who was entombed beneath Temple I. Lady Lahan Unen Moʼ, whose name means "Twelve Macaw Tails", was also important for being the mother of Jasaw Chan Kʼawill I's heir. In fact her son Yikʼin Chan Kʼawiil oversaw the completion of Temple II when he became king.

Temple II was visited by Modesto Méndez, the governor of Petén, in 1848 on the first expedition to the ruins. Preliminary excavations of Temple II started in 1958. On 21 December 2012, more than 7,000 tourists visited Tikal to celebrate the 2012 phenomenon and the supposed end of the world. Many of these tourists climbed the stairs of the pyramid, causing reported damages.

== The structure ==
The pyramid is a squat, massive structure dating to the 8th century AD. Today it stands 38 metres (125 ft) high and is the most thoroughly restored of the major temples at Tikal. Its original height would have been closer to 42 metres (138 ft) including its roof comb. The main stairway is 10.4 metres (34 ft) wide and projects 7.45 metres (24.4 ft) from the pyramid base. The base of the pyramid measures 37.6 by 41 metres (123 by 135 ft), covering a surface area of 1,542 square metres (16,600 sq ft). Excavations inside Temple II failed to discover Lady Kalajuun Une' Mo's tomb. Ancient graffiti within the temple shrine depicts a captive upon a platform and bound between two poles being sacrificed with an arrow or a spear. Further ancient graffiti includes images of temples. Some of this graffiti dates to the Classic Period, although other examples appear to date to the Early Postclassic. The interior walls have also been defaced with modern graffiti. Evidence of ritual use in the Postclassic Period was found within the temple shrine, including burials and offerings.

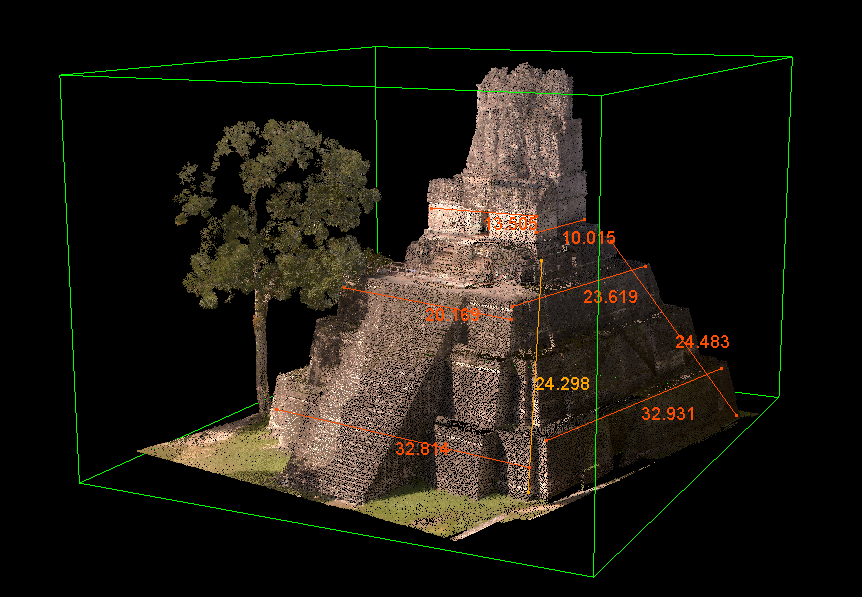
Laser scan projection of Temple II

The pyramid rises in three stepped levels; upon the uppermost level is a wide platform supporting the summit shrine. The first level measures 6.25 metres (20.5 ft) high, the second is 6.1 metres (20 ft) high and the third level stands 5.6 metres (18 ft) high, giving an average height of 5.98 metres (19.6 ft). The total height of the pyramidal base is 17.9 metres (59 ft), the summit shrine measures 9.8 metres (32 ft) high and the roof comb 12.3 metres (40 ft). Two badly eroded giant masks adorn the upper platform, flanking the stairway to the shrine. These grotesque masks decorating the pyramid's facade give Temple II its alternative name of the Temple of the Masks. A large block of masonry was built into the stairway immediately outside the entrance to the shrine. this block may have served as an observation platform allowing the officiating priests to see the crowd in the plaza below and in turn be seen by the people there.

The roof comb of the temple is highly ornate and bears the sculpture of a face with circular earspools. Various sealed chambers exist within the roof comb.

The temple shrine upon the summit of the pyramid contains three chambers, the doorways of which were spanned by lintels. Only the lintel over the middle doorway was carved. The lintel consisted of five wooden beams, one of which is now in the American Museum of Natural History in New York. When excavated the lintels had fallen from their original positions and have been restored.

At the base of the main access stairway stands Stela P-83, which was plain, without sculpted decoration or hieroglyphic texts. The stela stands 3.34 metres (11.0 ft) high and was broken but has been restored. It is associated with its respective altar. The distance from the base of the main stairway of Temple II, across the plaza to the base of the stairway of Temple I directly opposite is 70 metres (230 ft).

== See also ==
- El Castillo, Chichen Itza
- Pyramid of the Magician at Uxmal
- Temple of the Inscriptions at Palenque
- Tikal Temple I
- Tikal Temple III
- Tikal Temple IV
- Tikal Temple V
- List of tallest structures built before the 20th century
