= 28th Ruler =

Ajaw of the Maya city of Tikal c. 766–768

- Ajaw

King of Tikal
- Reign: c. 766–768
- Predecessor: Yikʼin Chan Kʼawiil
- Successor: Yax Nuun Ahiin II
- Born: Tikal
- Died: c. 768; Tikal
- Father: Yikʼin Chan Kʼawiil
- Religion: Maya religion

28th Ruler was an ajaw of the Maya city of Tikal. He ruled c. 766–768. Little is known about this ruler. He was a son of 27th ruler of Tikal Yikʼin Chan Kʼawiil and elder brother of his successor 29th ruler Yax Nuun Ahiin II.

== Footnotes ==
Regnal titles
Preceded by Yikʼin Chan Kʼawiil	Ajaw of Tikal c. 766–768	Succeeded by Yax Nuun Ahiin II
