= Yikʼin Chan Kʼawiil =

- Ajaw
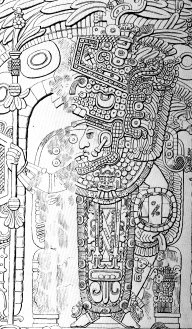
- Yikʼin Chan Kʼawiil as depicted in a lintel from Tikal Temple IV.

King of Tikal
- Reign: 8 December 734 – c. 755
- Predecessor: Jasaw Chan Kʼawiil I
- Successor: 28th Ruler
- Born: before 734; Tikal
- Died: c. 755; Tikal
- Issue: 28th Ruler; Yax Nuun Ahiin II
- Father: Jasaw Chan Kʼawiil I
- Mother: Lady Lahan Unen Moʼ
- Religion: Maya religion

Yikʼin Chan Kʼawiil (Note: The ruler's name, when transcribed is ?-(ya)-CHAN-KʼAWI꞉L-la, translated "Kʼawiil that Darkens the Sky", Martin & Grube 2008, p.48.) also known as Ruler B, Yaxkin Caan Chac and Sun Sky Rain, (before 734 – c. 746/766?), was an ajaw of the Maya city of Tikal. He took the throne on 8 December 734. (Note: These are the dates indicated on the Maya inscriptions in Mesoamerican Long Count calendar, Accession: 9.15.3.6.8 3 Lamat 6 Pax, Martin & Grube 2008, p.48.)

== Biography ==
Identified by Mayanist epigraphers as the 27th ruler in Tikal's dynastic succession, Yikʼin Chan Kʼawiil was one of Tikal's most successful and expansionary rulers, consolidating the political gains won by his father, Jasaw Chan Kʼawiil I. During his reign prolific building works were undertaken at Tikal, with a number of the site's significant still-standing structures commissioned or extended under his direction. Before advances in the decipherment of the Maya script revealed this reading of his name, this ruler was also known to researchers as Tikal Ruler B.

Yikʼin Kʼawiil conquered Calakmul in 736 and two other Calakmul allies in 743 and 744: El Peru to the east and Naranjo to the west, destroying the noose of power that had previously dominated the area.

His principal wife was a princess of Palenque. It is unknown exactly where his tomb lies, but strong archaeological parallels between Burial 116 (the resting place of his father) and Burial 196, located in the diminutive pyramid immediately south of Tikal Temple II and referred to as Structure 5D-73, suggest the latter may be the tomb of Yikʼin Chan Kawiil. Other possible locations, and likely candidates as mortuary shrines, include Tikal Temple IV and Tikal Temple VI.

The monuments and texts associated with Yikʼin Chan Kʼawiil are: Stelae 5, 20? and 21; Altars 2, 8? and 9; Column Altars 1, 2? and 3?; Temple 4 Lintels 2 and 3; Lintel from Structure 5D-52; Tikal Rock Sculpture?.

== Footnotes ==
Regnal titles
Preceded by Jasaw Chan Kʼawiil I	Ajaw of Tikal; 8 December 734 – c. 746	Succeeded by 28th Ruler
