= Lady Lahan Unen Moʼ =

- Ajaw
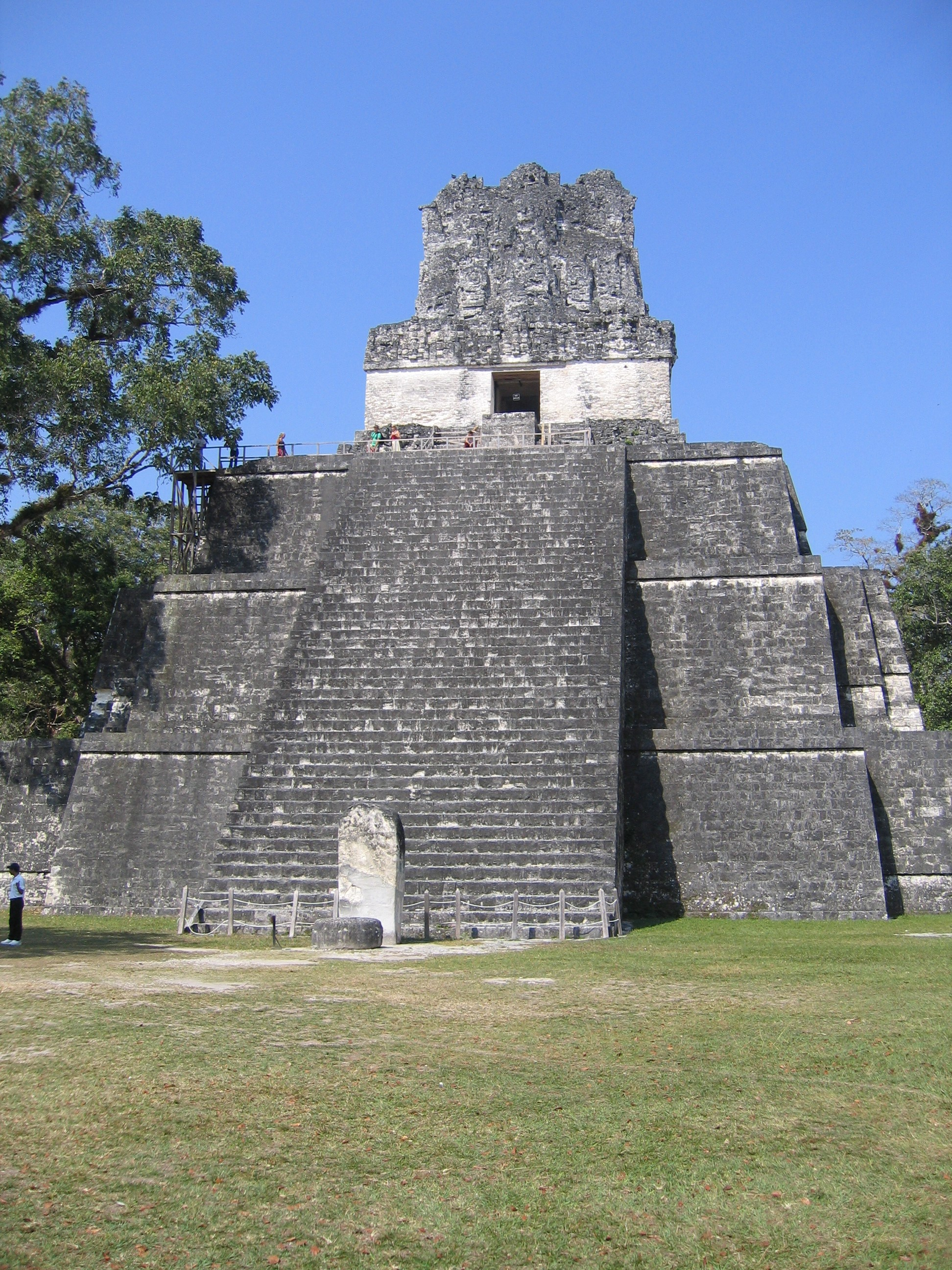
- Lady Twelve Macaw's Temple

Queen consort of Tikal
- Reign: c. 682–704?
- Died: c. 704; Tikal
- Spouse: Jasaw Chan Kʼawiil I
- Issue: Yikʼin Chan Kʼawiil
- Religion: Maya religion

Lady Lahan Unen Moʼ also known as Lady 12 Baby Macaws and Kalajuun Uneʼ Moʼ, was a Maya queen of Tikal as a wife of ajaw Jasaw Chan Kʼawiil I. She was the mother of ajaw Yikʼin Chan Kʼawiil. She died in c. 704.

Tikal Temple II, the Temple of the Masks, was built for her. It has a single wooden sculpted lintel that bears the portrait of the queen.
