= Jasaw Chan Kʼawiil I =

- Ajaw
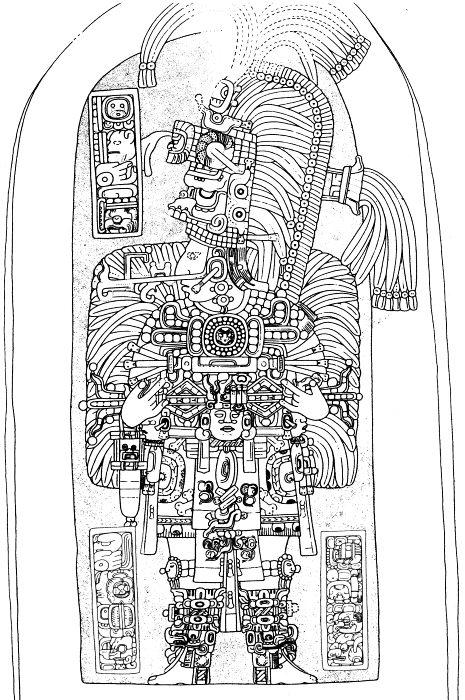
- Jasaw Chan K'awiil's portrait on Stela 16

King of Tikal
- Reign: 3 May 682 – 734
- Predecessor: Nuun Ujol Chaak
- Successor: Yikʼin Chan Kʼawiil
- Born: before 682; Tikal
- Died: 734; Tikal
- Burial: Temple 1 (Burial 116)
- Spouse: Lady Lahan Unen Moʼ
- Issue: Yikʼin Chan Kʼawiil
- Father: Nuun Ujol Chaak
- Mother: Lady Jaguar Seat
- Religion: Maya religion

Jasaw Chan Kʼawiil I (Note: The ruler's name, when transcribed is ja-sa-wa CHAN-na-KʼAWI꞉L-la, translated "Kʼawiil that Clears? the Sky", Martin & Grube 2008, p.44.) also known as Ruler A, Ah Cacao and Sky Rain (before 682–734), was an ajaw of the Maya city of Tikal. He took the throne on 3 May 682, and reigned until his death. (Note: These are the dates indicated on the Maya inscriptions in Mesoamerican Long Count calendar, Accession: 9.12.9.17.16 5 Kib 14 Sotzʼ, Martin & Grube 2008, p.44.)

== Biography ==
Before advances in the decipherment of the Maya script revealed this reading of his name, this ruler was also known to researchers as Tikal Ruler A, Jasaw Chan Kʼawiil or by the nickname Ah Cacao.

One of the most celebrated of Tikal's rulers, Jasaw Chan Kʼawiil's reign came at the end of a 130-year-long hiatus in Tikal's historical record, and his defeat of the rival Maya city of Calakmul in 695 is seen to represent a resurgence in the strength and influence of Tikal.

Two structures at Tikal in particular are associated with Jasaw Chan Kʼawiil. Tikal Temple I is a classically Petén-styled stepped pyramid structure which served as this ruler's tomb, although it is unclear whether it was built for this specific purpose. Tikal Temple II served as the tomb for his wife, Lady Lahan Unen Moʼ (died c. 704). His successor was his son Yikʼin Chan Kʼawiil.

== Footnotes ==
Regnal titles
Preceded by Nuun Ujol Chaak	Ajaw of Tikal; 3 May 682 – 734	Succeeded by Yikʼin Chan Kʼawiil
