= Yax Nuun Ahiin II =

- Ajaw
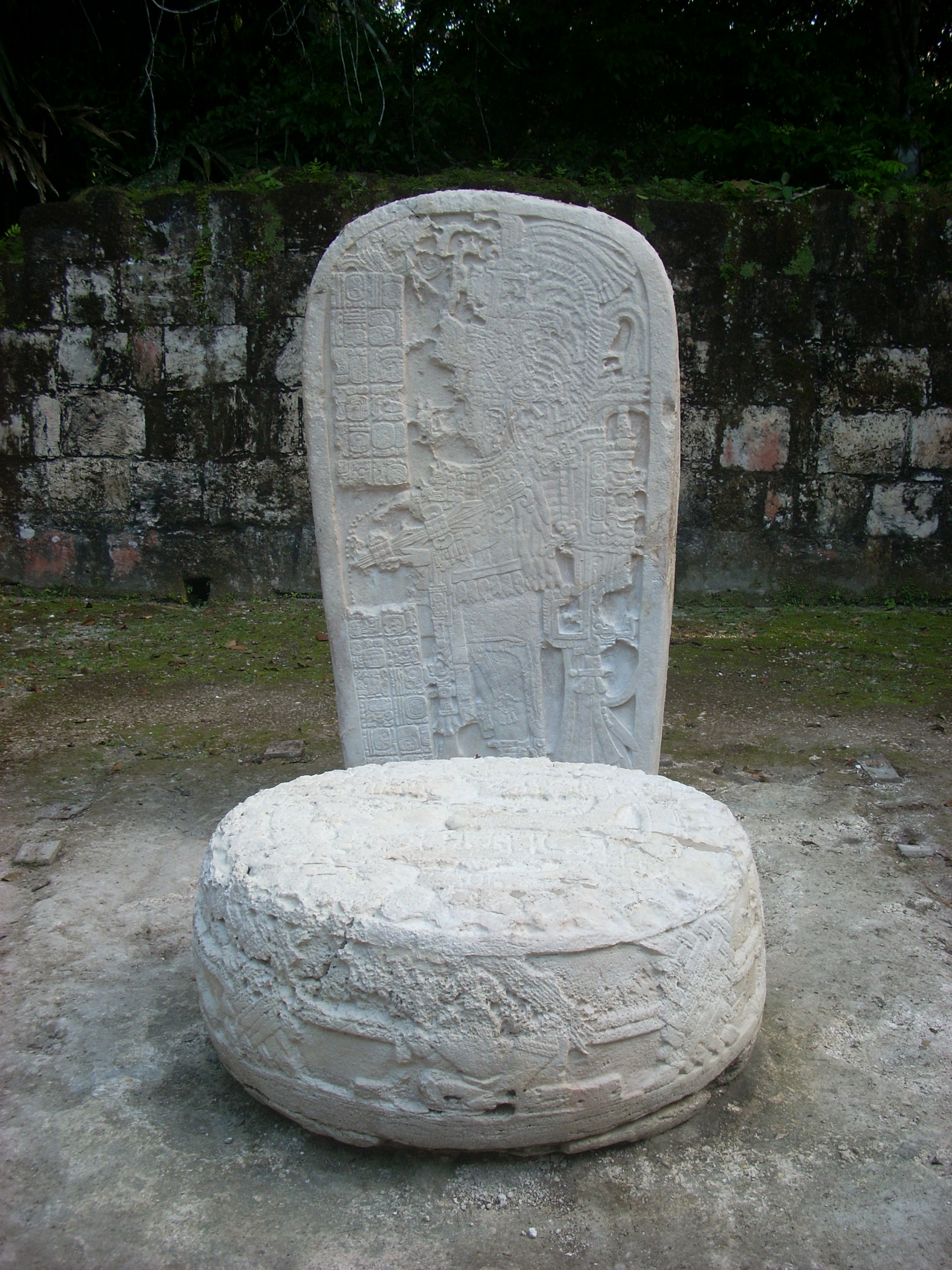
- Yax Nuun Ahiin II's portrait on Stela 22

King of Tikal
- Reign: 25 December 768 - c.794
- Predecessor: 28th Ruler
- Successor: Nuun Ujol K'inich
- Born: before 768; Tikal
- Died: c.794 Tikal
- Father: Yik'in Chan K'awiil
- Religion: Maya religion

Yax Nuun Ahiin II (Note: The ruler's name, when transcribed is YAX-?-AYI:N, translated "First ? Calman", Martin & Grube 2008, p.51.) also known as Ruler C and Chitam, (before 768-c.794), was an ajaw of the Maya city of Tikal. He took the throne on December 25, 768 and reigning probably until his death. (Note: These are the dates indicated on the Maya inscriptions in Mesoamerican Long Count calendar, Accession: 9.16.17.16.4 11 K'an 12 K'ayab, Martin & Grube 2008, p.51.) He was son of Yik'in Chan K'awiil and brother of 28th Ruler. The monuments associated with Yax Nuun Ahiin II are: Stelae 19, 21 and Altars 6 and 10.

== Footnotes ==
Regnal titles
Preceded by 28th Ruler	Ajaw of Tikal; December 25, 768-c.794	Succeeded by Nuun Ujol K'inich
