= Mesoamerican pyramids =

Prominent architectural features of ancient Mesoamerican civilizations

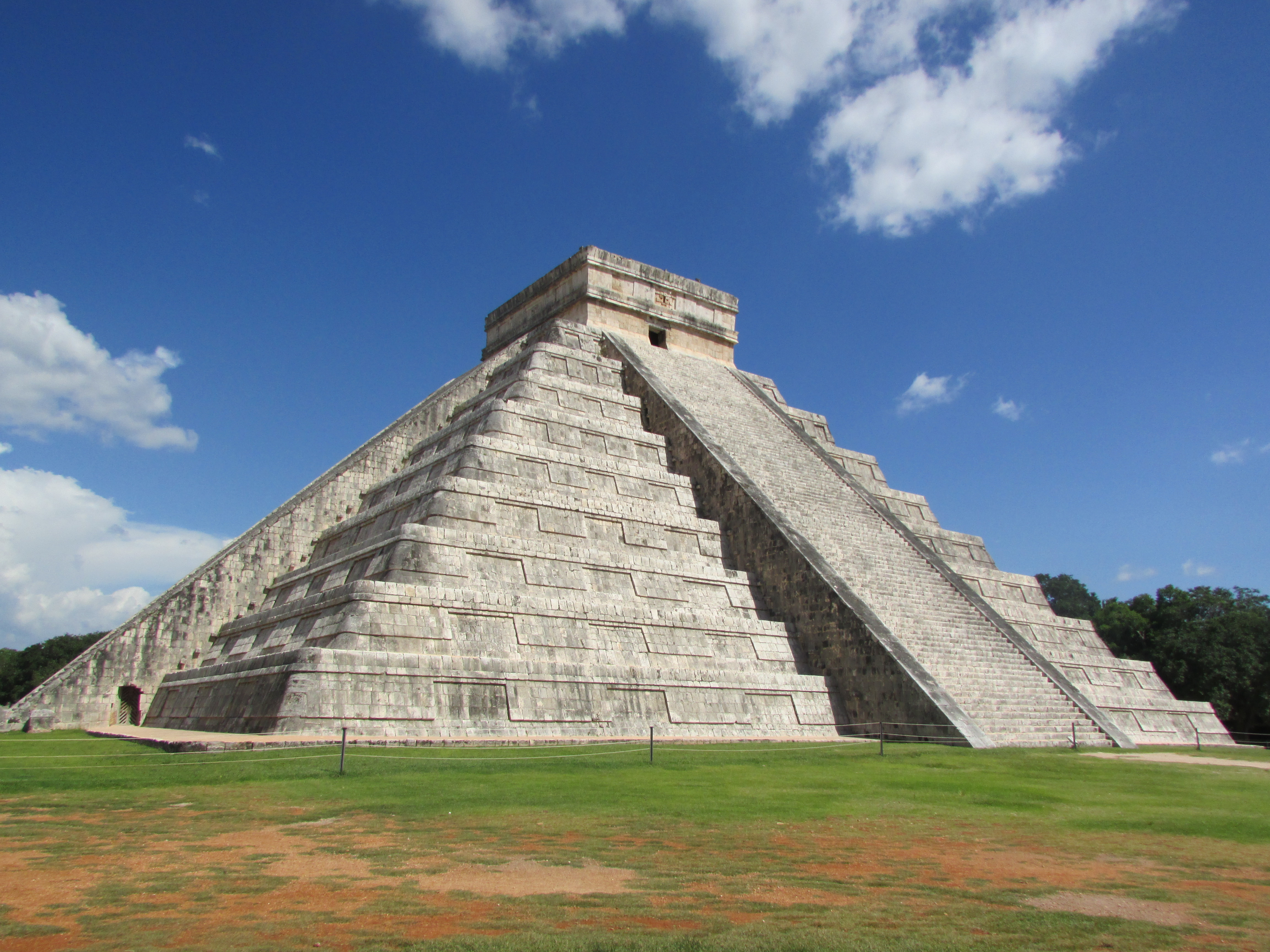
El Castillo, Chichen Itza

Mesoamerican pyramids form a prominent part of ancient Mesoamerican architecture. Although similar in some ways to Egyptian pyramids, these structures have flat tops (many with temples on the top) and stairs ascending their faces, more similar to ancient Mesopotamian Ziggurats. Most pyramids had square bases, but there were also pyramids of other shapes, including rounded ones. The largest pyramid in the world by volume is the Great Pyramid of Cholula, in the east-central Mexican state of Puebla. The builders of certain classic Mesoamerican pyramids decorated them copiously with stories about the Hero Twins, the feathered serpent Quetzalcoatl, Mesoamerican creation myths, ritualistic sacrifice, etc. written in the form of Maya script on the rises of the steps of the pyramids, on the walls, and on the sculptures contained within.

== Aztec pyramids ==
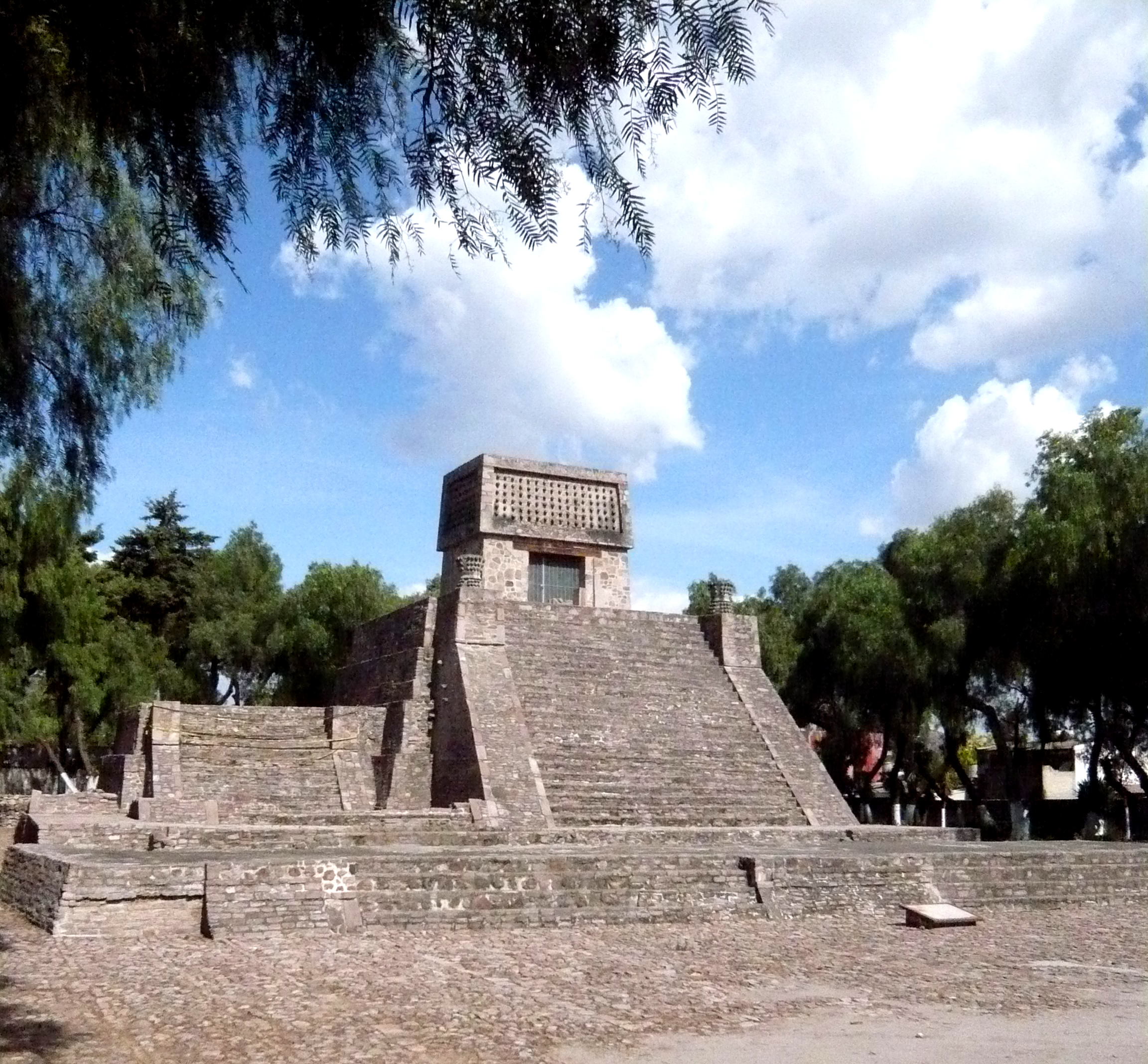
Santa Cecilia Acatitlan pyramid

The Aztecs dominated central Mexico in the 14th, 15th and 16th centuries. Their capital was Tenochtitlan on the shore of Lake Texcoco – the site of modern-day Mexico City. They were related to the preceding cultures in the basin of Mexico such as the culture of Teotihuacan whose building style they adopted and adapted. Sites involving Aztec pyramids include:

- El Tepozteco
- Malinalco
- Santa Cecilia Acatitlan
- Templo Mayor
- Tenayuca
- Tenochtitlan

== Maya pyramids ==
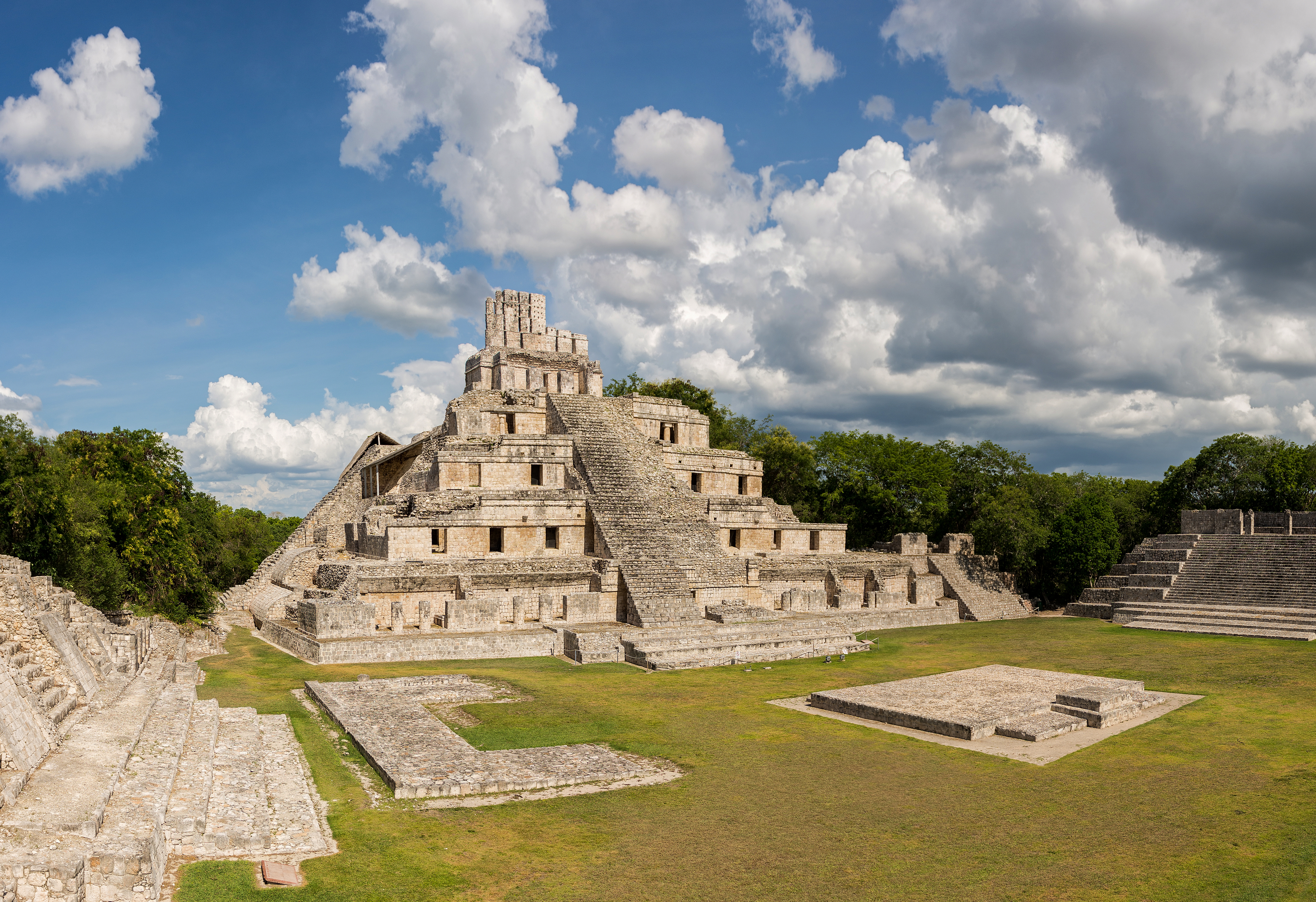
Edzna

The Maya are a people of southern Mexico and northern Central America (Guatemala, Belize, western Honduras, and El Salvador). Archaeological evidence shows that by the Preclassic Maya (1000 B.C., approximately 3,000 years ago) they were building pyramidal-plaza ceremonial architecture. The earliest monuments consisted of simple burial mounds, the precursors to the spectacular stepped pyramids from the Terminal Pre-classic period and beyond.

Mayan temples have a pyramid-like structure. These pyramids relied on intricate carved stone in order to create a stair-stepped design. Many of these structures featured a top platform upon which a smaller dedicatory building was constructed, associated with a particular Maya deity. Maya pyramid-like structures were also erected to serve as a place of interment for powerful rulers. Maya pyramidal structures occur in a great variety of forms and functions, bounded by regional and periodical differences.

- Aguateca
- Altun Ha
- Bonampak
- Calakmul
- Caracol
- Chichen Itza
- Coba
- Copan
- Dos Pilas
- Edzna
- El Mirador
- El Tigre
- La Danta
- Kaminaljuyu
- Lamanai
- Los Monos
- Lubaantun
- Mayapan
- Mixco Viejo
- Moral Reforma
- Nim Li Punit
- Palenque: Temple of the Inscriptions
- San Andrés, El Salvador
- Tazumal
- Tikal: Tikal Temple I; Tikal Temple II; Tikal Temple III; Tikal Temple IV; Tikal Temple V; Lost World Pyramid; Talud-Tablero Temple
- Tonina
- Uxmal
- Yaxchilan
- Yaxha
- Xunantunich

== Olmecs ==
The Olmecs were an ancient group of indigenous peoples that occupied territory in Mesoamerica stretching from Veracruz to Tabasco around 1300-400 BCE.

The Olmec Great Pyramid of La Venta is argued to be one of the earliest and most complex settlement and ceremonial sites that can be found amongst Mesoamerican civilizations.

- La Venta

== Purépechans ==
The Tarascan state was a pre-columbian culture located in the modern day Mexican state of Michoacán. The region is currently inhabited by the modern descendants of the Purépecha. Purépechan architecture is noted for T-shaped step pyramids known as yácatas.

- Tzintzuntzan

== Teotihuacan ==
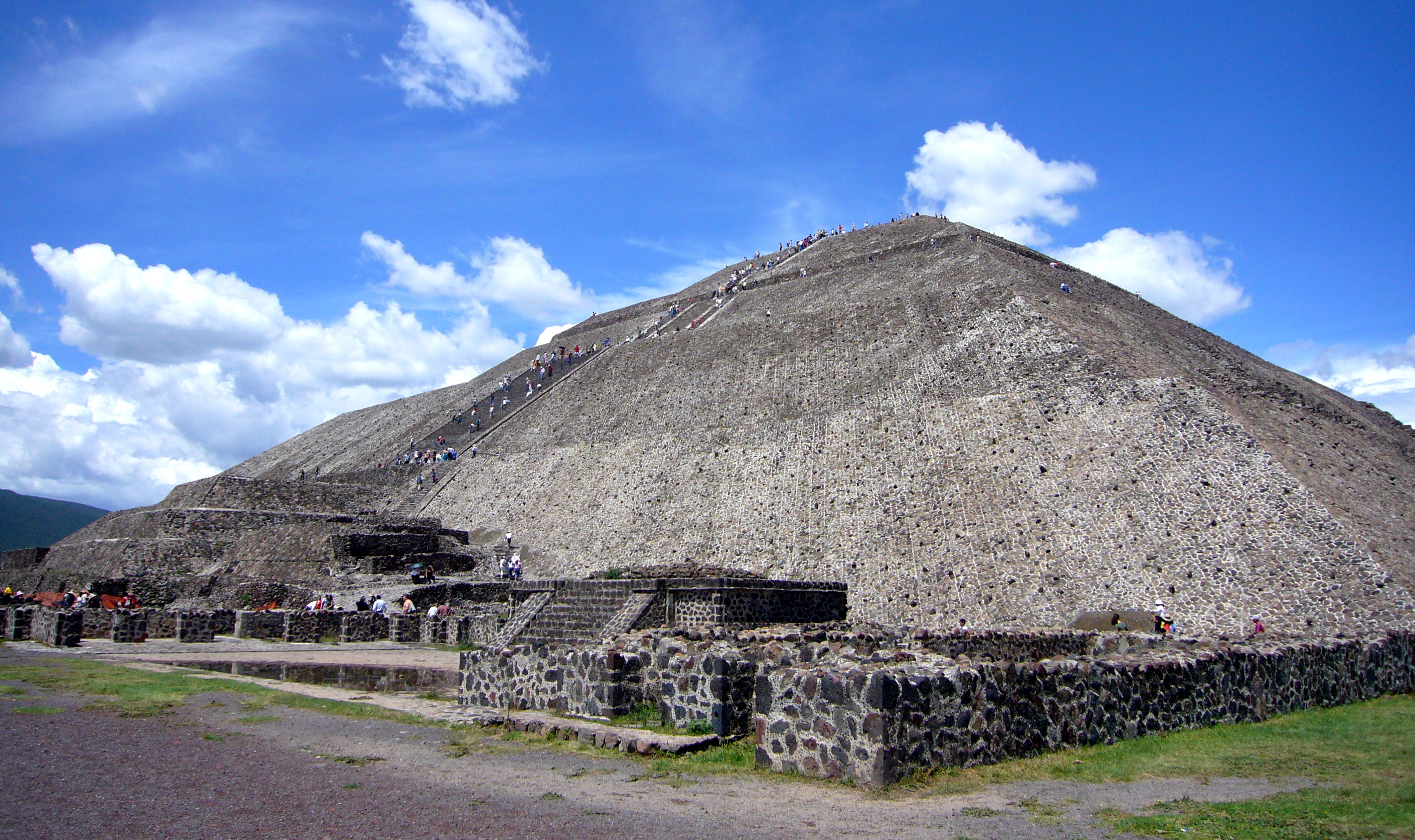
Pyramid of the Sun

The Teotihuacan civilization, which flourished from around 300 BCE to 500 CE, at its greatest extent included most of Mesoamerica. Teotihuacano culture collapsed around 550 and was followed by several large city-states such as Xochicalco (whose inhabitants were probably of Matlatzinca ethnicity), Cholula (whose inhabitants were probably Oto-Manguean), and later the ceremonial site of Tula (which has traditionally been claimed to have been built by Toltecs but which now is thought to have been founded by the Huastec culture).

- El Castillo and High Priest's Temple in Chichen Itza
- Pyramids of the Sun, the Moon and Temple of the Feathered Serpent in Teotihuacan
- Xochicalco
- Talud-tablero

== Toltec ==
The site called Tula, the Toltec capital, in the state of Mexico is one of the best preserved five-tier pyramids in Mesoamerican civilization. The ground plan of the site has two pyramids, Pyramid B and Pyramid C.

The Toltec empire lasted from around 700 to 1100. Although the origin of the Toltec Empire is a mystery, they are said to have migrated Mexico's northern plateau until they set up their empire's capital in central Mexico, called Tula, which is 70 km/40 mi northwest of modern day Mexico City. When the city of Tula was in its prime it had around 40,000 people living in it and the city flourished from 900 to 1100. The city of Tula had a main plaza surrounded by 2 pyramids and a ritual ball court. The most popular pyramid on this site (pyramid b) is the pyramid of Quetzalcoatl which is a five-tiered pyramid with four giant carved pillars on top. The pyramid of Quetzalcoatl was named after a story of a legendary priest, also named Quetzalcoatl who was exiled from Tula around the year 1000. He is said to have ended warfare between Mayan city states and after that the Toltecs started worshiping Quetzalcoatl.

== Classic Veracruz ==
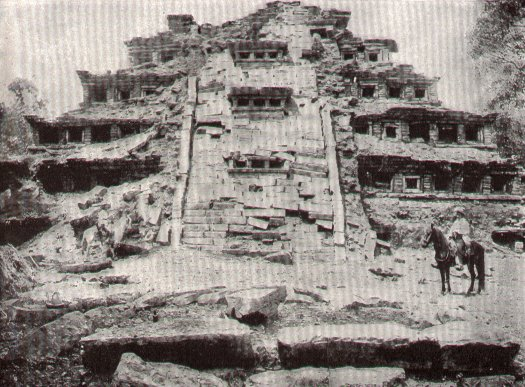
El Tajín

The best known Classic Veracruz pyramid, the Pyramid of Niches in El Tajín, is smaller than those of their neighbors and successors but more intricate.

- El Tajín

== Zapotecs ==
The Zapotecs were one of the earliest Mesoamerican cultures and held sway over the Valley of Oaxaca region from the early first millennium BCE to about the 14th century.

- Monte Albán
- Mitla

== Lencans ==
Historians divide the Lenca chronology into two, the Preclassic Proto-Lencas and the later Lencas as we known today.

- Los Naranjos
- Yarumela
- Tenampúa
- Quelepa

== Chalchihuites ==
The following site is from the modern-day state of Zacatecas, built by cultures whose ethnic affiliations are unknown:

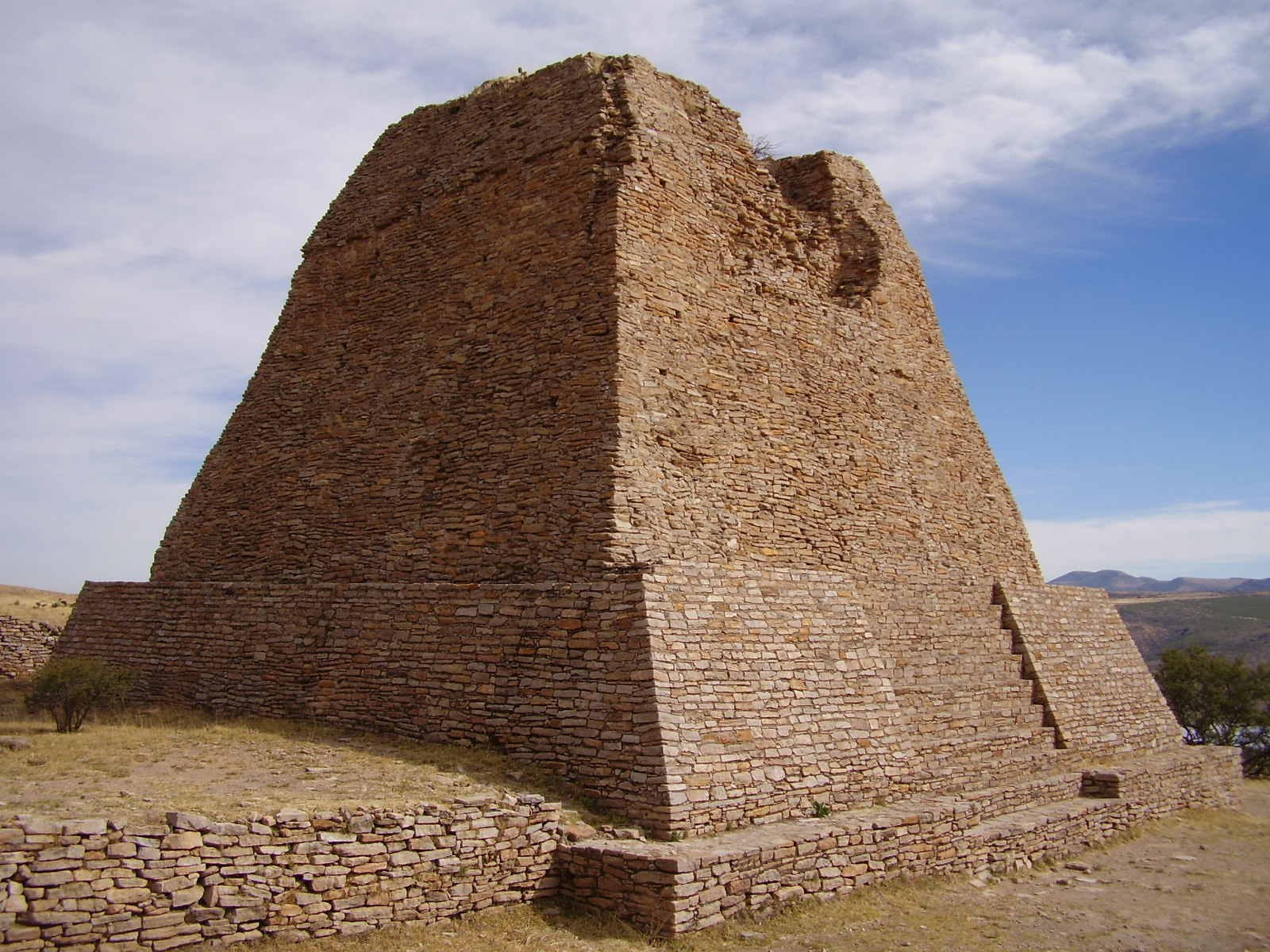
Votive Pyramid at La Quemada

A great quantity of buildings were constructed on artificial terraces upon the slopes of a La Quemada. The materials used here include stone slab and clay. The most important structures are: The Hall of Columns, The Ball Court, The Votive Pyramid, and The Palace and the Barracks. On the most elevated part of the hill is The Fortress. This is composed of a small pyramid and a platform, encircled by a wall that is more than 800m long and up to six feet high. La Quemada was occupied from 800 to 1200. Their founders and occupants have not been identified with certainty but probably belonged to either the Chalchihuites culture or that of the neighboring Malpaso culture.

== The debate over Olmec architectural influence ==
Modern archaeological scholarly thinking has been revising the concept of the Olmecs as diffusing the majority of cultural influence in regards to architectural similarities between various Mesoamerican pyramids.

=== The debate between the "mother" and "sister" culture models ===
The origin of the term mother culture, in regards to Mesoamerica, entered into the Mesoamerican historiographical lexicon in 1942 from archaeologist Alfonso Caso denoting that the OImecs were the "cultura madre". The mother culture model argues that there was one defining culture, the Olmecs, from where therein coexisting Mesoamerican societies derived a significant portion of fundamental societal and cultural facets. The sister culture model argues that the Olmecs were not the sole undeviating source of cultural diffusion for other Mesoamerican civilizations, but rather a segment in ongoing cultural diffusion in Mesoamerica. Further progression of the debate has evolved into costly signaling theory which argues that Mesoamerican cultures were influenced by prestigious displays which manifested, amongst other things, in their architecture. Another key facet of the debate questioned the application of the term "Mother culture" and argues that contemporary Mesoamerican civilizations were functional without Olmec influence and describing the Olmecs as the "mother culture" robs the Olmecs and the other civilizations of their agency.

=== Evidence for ===
==== Mayan ====
In 2013, archaeological research done on the ancient Mayan city of Ceibal have hypothesized that the Olmecs had significantly lesser prominence in regards to shared architectural characteristics. This is supported by evidence, in the form of radiocarbon dating, that was found at Ceibal pointing to a flux between a plethora of Mesoamerican cultures, somewhere between 1150 BCE and 850 BCE, in which a continued diffusion of culture occurred. This evidence suggests multidirectional influence in regards to the dissemination of pyramid architecture amongst Mesoamerican civilizations.

- Ceibal

== See also ==
- Mesoamerican architecture
- Platform mound
- South American pyramids
- Step pyramid
- Triadic pyramid
- Ziggurat
