= Roof comb =

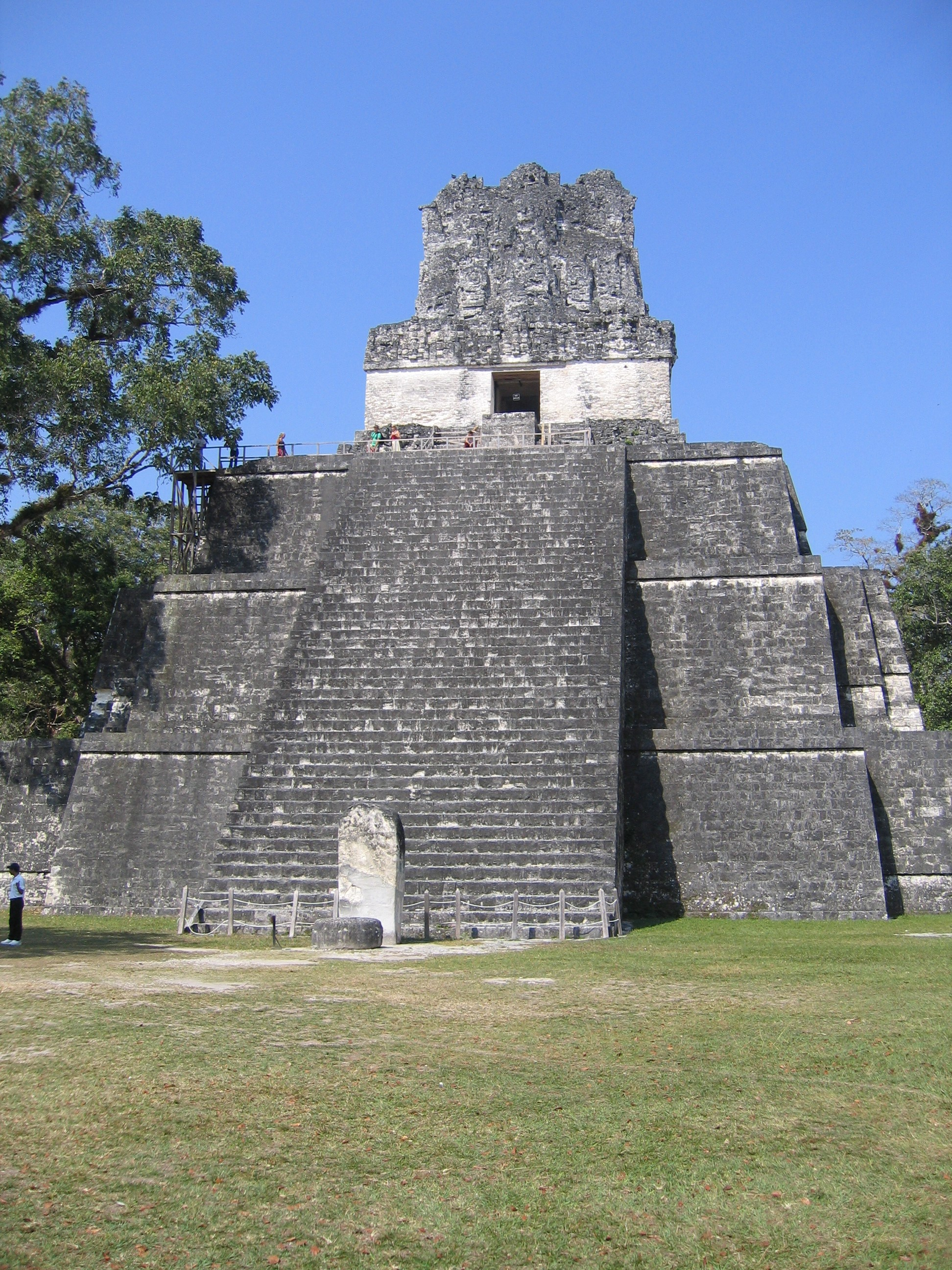
Maya pyramid at Tikal with prominent roof comb

The roof comb (or roof-comb) is a false front structure that tops a pyramid in monumental Mesoamerican architecture. Typically, the roof combs crowned the summit of pyramids and other structures; they consisted of two pierced framework walls which leaned on one another. This framework was covered by plaster decorated with artist depictions of gods or important rulers. Examination of the sections and iconography of Maya civilization roof-combs indicates that each icon had specific sacred meanings.

== History and significance ==
The Mayans engineered some of the most important monuments in Mesoamerica. Their civilization experienced its ‘golden age’ between 500 and 900 AD. Recent deciphering of Maya hieroglyphs has brought new understanding to their architecture; these pictographic symbols tell historians about when specific structures were built and by whom. In Mayan religious architecture there was an emphasis on height, which was often manifested by vertiginous staircases that reached toward the heavens and gods. Oftentimes pyramids were built over existing ones; this embraced ancestral authority while allowing for greater structural height(s).

Monumental pyramids, platforms, temples, and sacrificial altars were used in daily religious rituals. The hierarchy of various Mayan cities was made evident by large palace compounds, and kings and rulers used ornate architecture to promote themselves and ensure their immortality. Roof combs provided variety to the limited iterations of Mayan architecture.

Symbolically, it is said that a roof comb was the headdress of the building – that of which resembles those worn by the kings and rulers. It was not enough to simply design, architects sought to embellish their work – to pay tribute to the great gods and Mayan leaders their work was built for. The Mayan people lived and worked in a range of dwellings; many Mayan homes were clustered wood structures covered in thatch, while their rich counterparts enjoyed opulent palaces. Roof combs acted as ‘curb appeal’ for the homes and buildings of the socially elite.

== Structural description ==
As mentioned, the cultural importance regarding height was particularly significant when building monuments. Because of the limitations of corbel vaulting many Mayan structures were designed with only a few stories. Architects wrangled about the best ways to magnify their design to memorialize their culture. Almost always a roof comb would serve no structural function, and on these structures the combs acted as an ornate false front facade. Architects used a lattice of stonework to create the combs, and this method proved to be strong and permanent. “Roof combs often were carved or painted with zoomorphic or anthropomorphic motifs as well as texts”. The best examples of Mayan roof combs can be seen at the great temples of Tikal. These temples serve as funerary monuments for late rulers, and the combs are adorned with intricate and commemorative mosaic portraits.

== Sources ==
- Morley, Sylvanus Griswold; Sharer, Robert J. (1994). The Ancient Maya (5th ed.). Stanford, CA: Stanford University Press. p. 637. ISBN 978-0-8047-2130-1.
