= Gran Museo de Chichén Itzá =

Coordinates: 20.6899°N 88.5671°W

Great Museum of Chichén Itzá
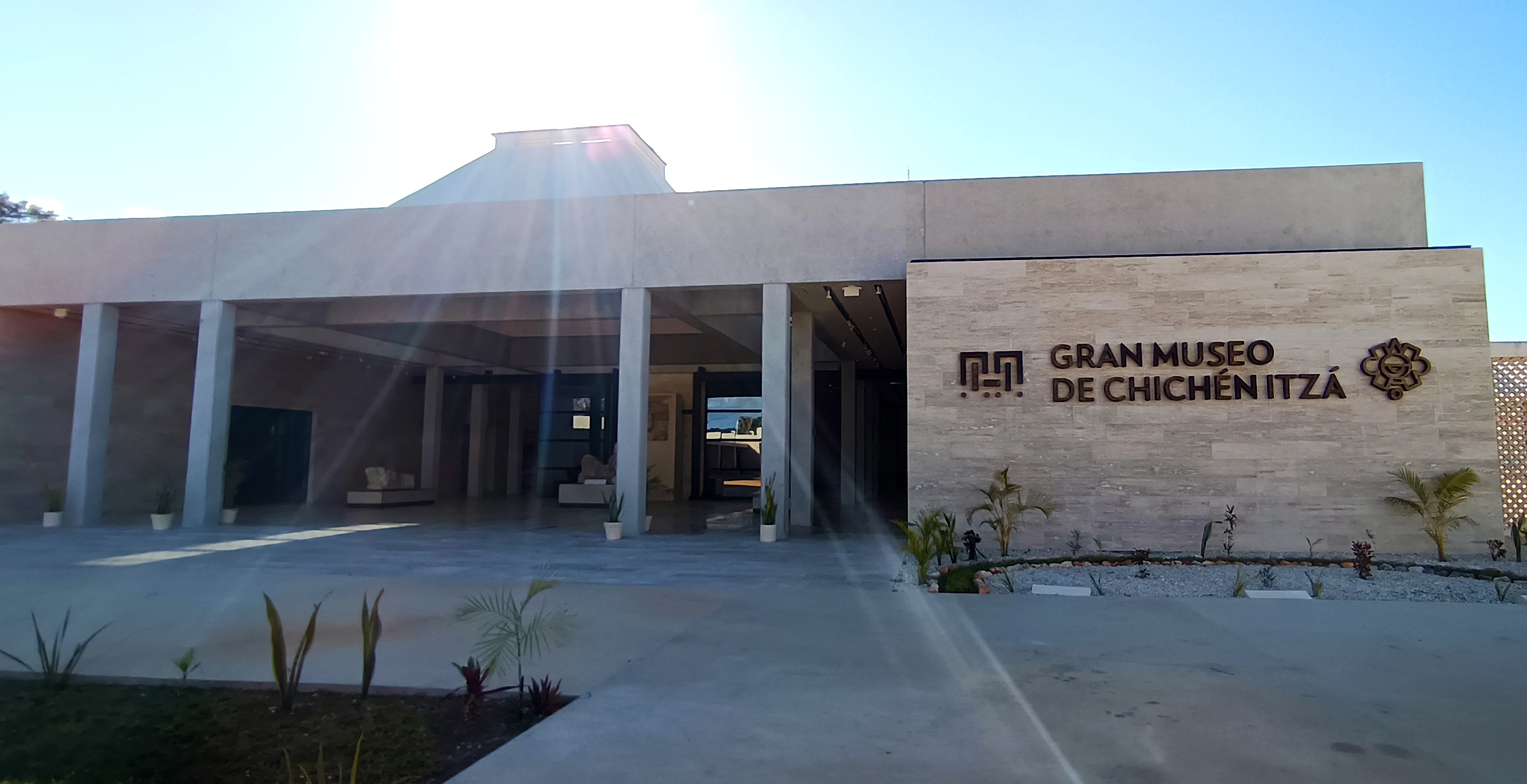
- Entrance of the Great Museum of Chichén Itzá
- Established: February 28, 2024
- Location: Tinum Municipality, Yucatán, Mexico
- Type: Archaeological museum
- Collection size: Over 1,000 pieces (400 originals and replicas)
- Director: Jesús Samuel Hernández Hernández
- Website: https://sic.cultura.gob.mx/ficha.php?table=museo&table_id=2422

The Great Museum of Chichén Itzá (Spanish: Gran Museo de Chichén Itzá) is an archaeological museum located near the town of Pisté, in the municipality of Tinum, Yucatán, Mexico. Inaugurated on February 28, 2024, the museum houses a collection of over 1,000 pieces, including 400 original artifacts donated by the Regional Museum of Anthropology of Yucatán, the Gran Museo del Mundo Maya in Mérida, and materials recovered during archaeological salvage work carried out during the construction of the Maya Train.

== Description ==
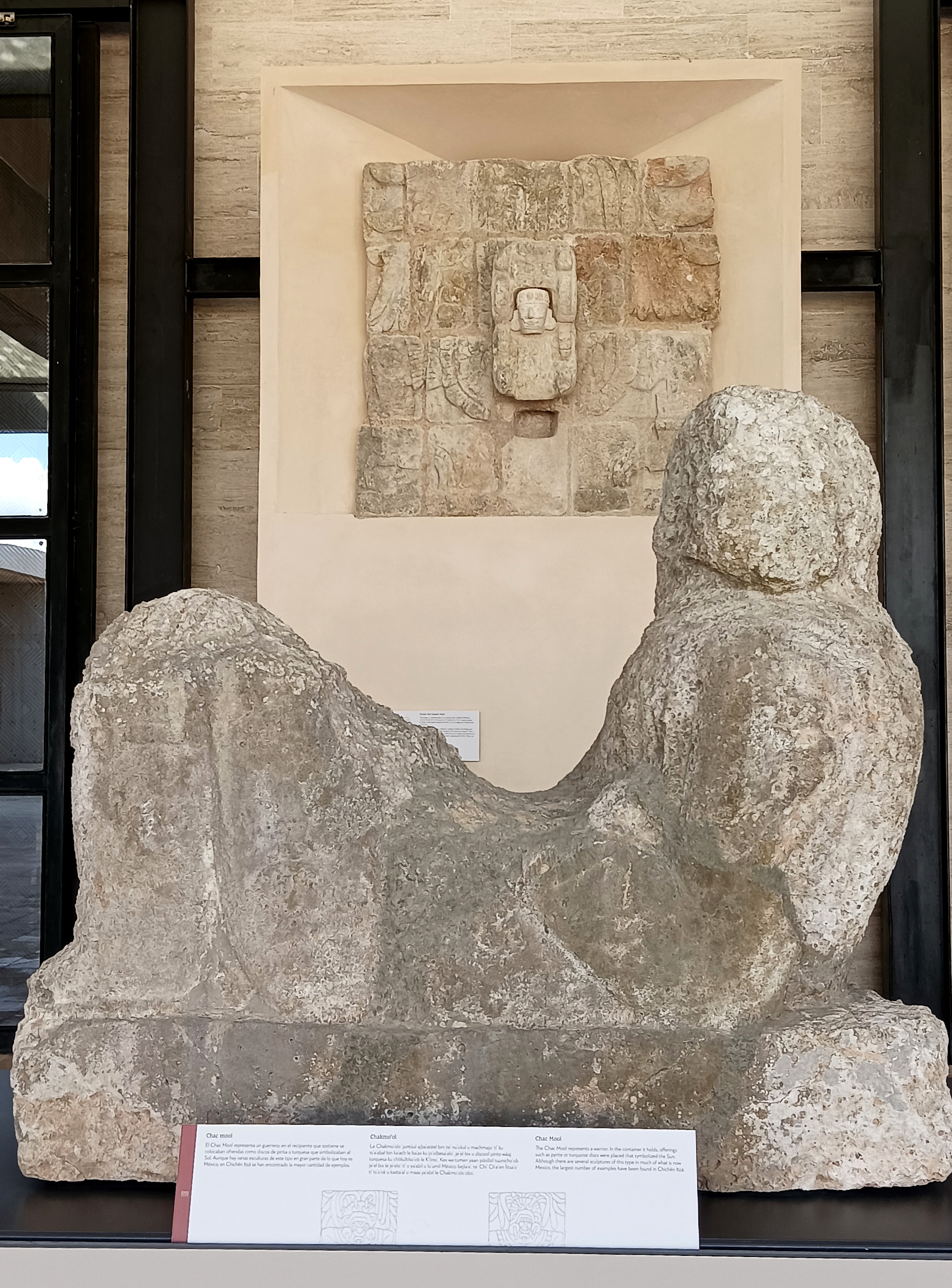
Chac Mool sculpture at the museum entrance

The museum offers an immersive experience into the history of Chichén Itzá, one of the most important cities of the Maya civilization. Through more than 540 archaeological pieces and lots, visitors can explore the development of this city.

== Exhibitions and themes ==
The museographic script is based on studies by the INAH Yucatán Center and the Chichén Itzá Archaeological Project. The exhibition is organized into 14 thematic axes:

- Welcome to Chichén Itzá
- Flora and fauna
- Ceramic chronology
- Trade routes
- Sacred Cenote
- Cosmovision and power
- Writing and lineage
- Ballgame
- Astronomy and mathematics
- Architecture
- Urban development
- Mural painting and stucco
- Specialized production areas
- Social organization

A standout feature is the Sacred Cenote Room, which offers a multimedia recreation of this water body used in Mayan rituals. Recently discovered artifacts are also displayed, such as a stone table with reliefs of captives and an offering of five vessels found in Sacbé 4.

== Accessibility and location ==
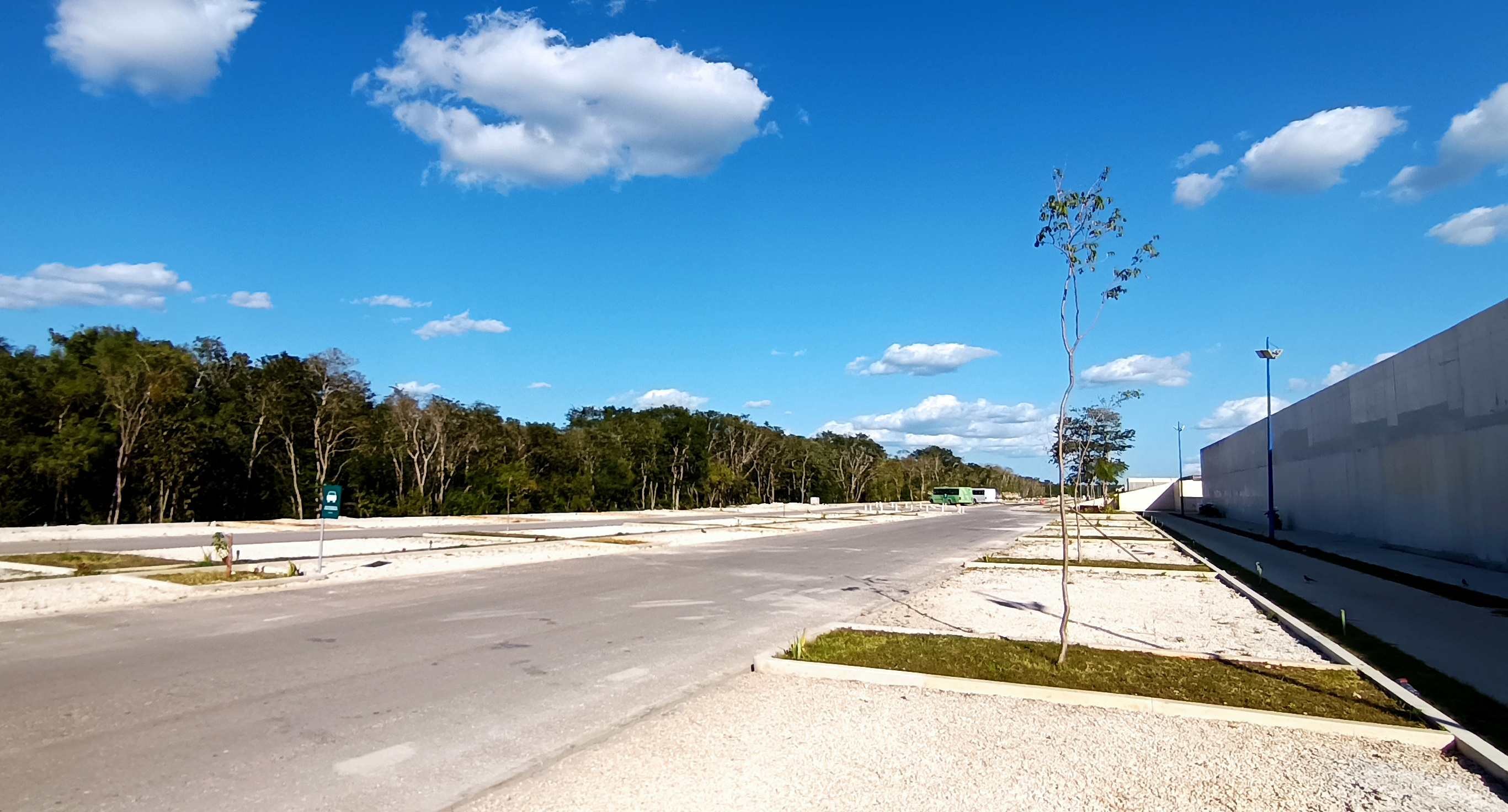
The parking lot

The museum is located in the archaeological zone of Chichén Itzá and can be visited by tourists arriving at the Chichén Itzá station of the Maya Train. It includes an immense parking lot, research laboratories, conservation storage, and a specialized library on Mesoamerican studies.
