= Chichén Itzá railway station =

Railway station in Yucatán, Mexico

Coordinates: 20.7205°N 88.5489°W

Chichén Itzá

General information
- Location: Tinum Municipality, Mexico

History
- Opened: February 29, 2024

Services
Preceding station	Tren Maya	Following station
Izamal toward Palenque	Tren Maya	Valladolid toward Cancún Airport
Location

Chichén Itzá is a train station near Pisté, Yucatán, Mexico. It serves the archaeological site of the same name and the Great Museum of Chichén Itzá.

== Tren Maya ==
Andrés Manuel López Obrador announced the Tren Maya project in his 2018 presidential campaign. On 13 August 2018, he announced the complete outline. The route of the new route of the Mayan Train put the Chichén Itzá station on the route that would connect with Mérida, Yucatán.

It is believed that this will be one of the busiest stations on the Tren Maya, because it will serve many tourists visiting Chichen Itza.

The station was inaugurated Thursday, 29 February 2024, with a trip including President Andrés Manuel López Obrador, local officials, and media members.
