= Temple of the Inscriptions =

Mayan stepped pyramid

Coordinates: 17.4836°N 92.0468°W

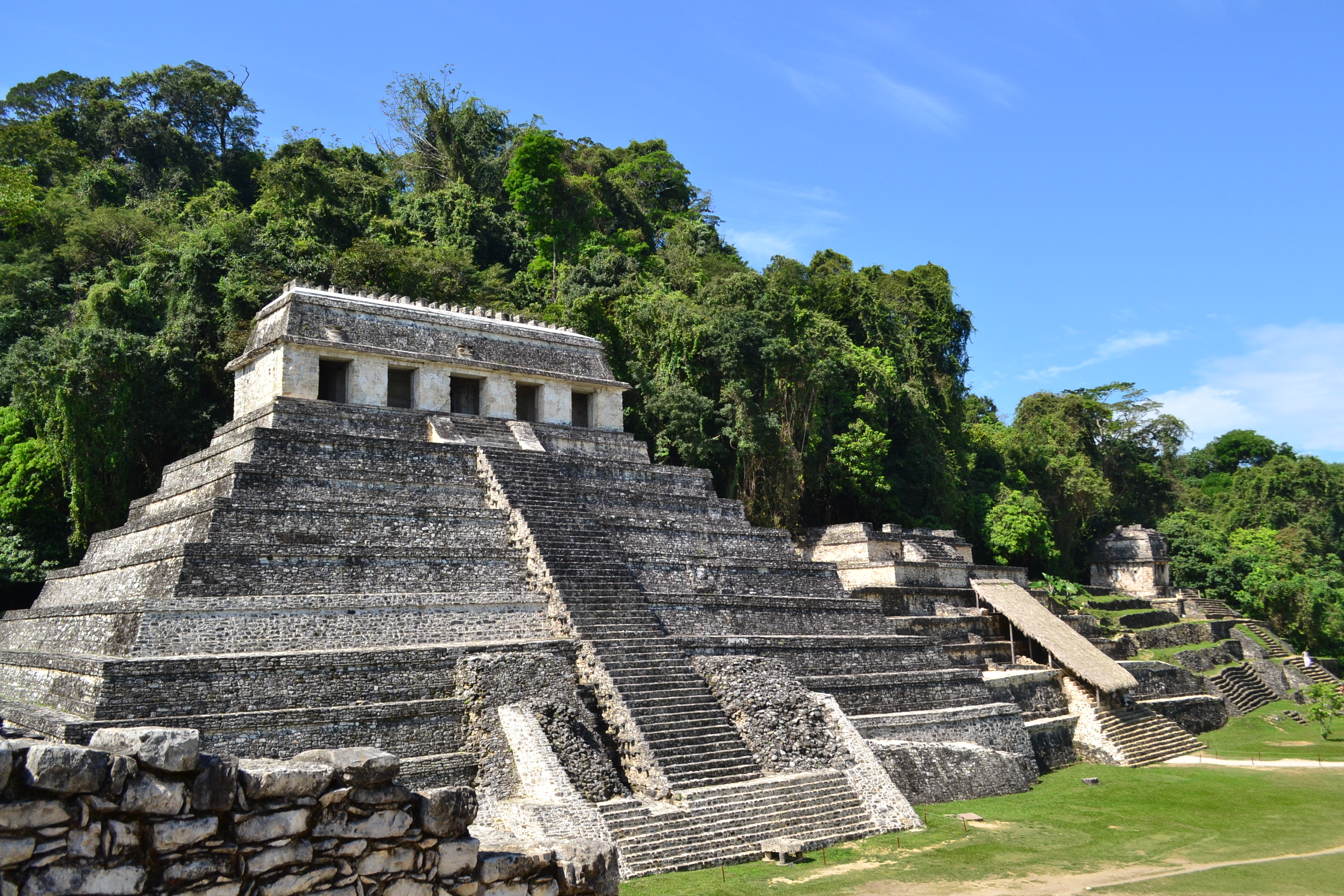
Temple of Inscriptions

The Temple of the Inscriptions (Classic Maya: Bʼolon Yej Teʼ Naah (Mayan pronunciation: [ɓolon jex teʔ naːh]) "House of the Nine Sharpened Spears") is the largest Mesoamerican stepped pyramid structure at the pre-Columbian Maya civilization site of Palenque, located in the modern-day state of Chiapas, Mexico. The structure was specifically built as the funerary monument for Kʼinich Janaabʼ Pakal, ajaw or ruler of Palenque in the 7th century, whose reign over the polity lasted almost 70 years. Construction of this monument commenced in the last decade of his life, and was completed by his son and successor Kʼinich Kan Bahlam II. Within Palenque, the Temple of the Inscriptions is located in an area known as the Temple of the Inscriptions’ Court and stands at a right angle to the southeast of the palace. The Temple of the Inscriptions has been significant in the study of the ancient Maya, owing to the extraordinary sample of hieroglyphic text found on the Inscription Tablets, the impressive sculptural panels on the piers of the building, and the finds inside the tomb of Pakal.

== Structure ==
The structure consists of a "temple" structure that sits atop an eight-stepped pyramid (for a total of nine levels). The five entrances in the front of the building are surrounded by piers bearing both carved images and the hieroglyphic texts in Maya script for which the temple was named. Inside the temple, a stairway leads to the crypt containing the sarcophagus of Pakal.

== History ==
The Temple of the Inscriptions was finished a short time after 683. The construction was initiated by Pakal himself, although his son, Kʼinich Kan Bahlam II completed the structure and its final decoration.

Despite the fact that Palenque, and the Temple of Inscriptions itself, had been visited and studied for more than two hundred years, the tomb of Pakal was not discovered until 1952. Alberto Ruz Lhuillier, a Mexican archaeologist, removed a stone slab from the floor of the temple, revealing a stairway filled with rubble. Two years later, when the stairway was cleared, it was discovered that it led into Pakal’s tomb.

== Piers ==
The temple has six piers, or vertical panels. These are labeled A through F, each with texts, artistic representations, or both executed in reliefs made from plaster stucco. Piers A and F have only hieroglyphic text on them. Piers B through E have images of people holding an infant-like figure, which has a snake as one leg.

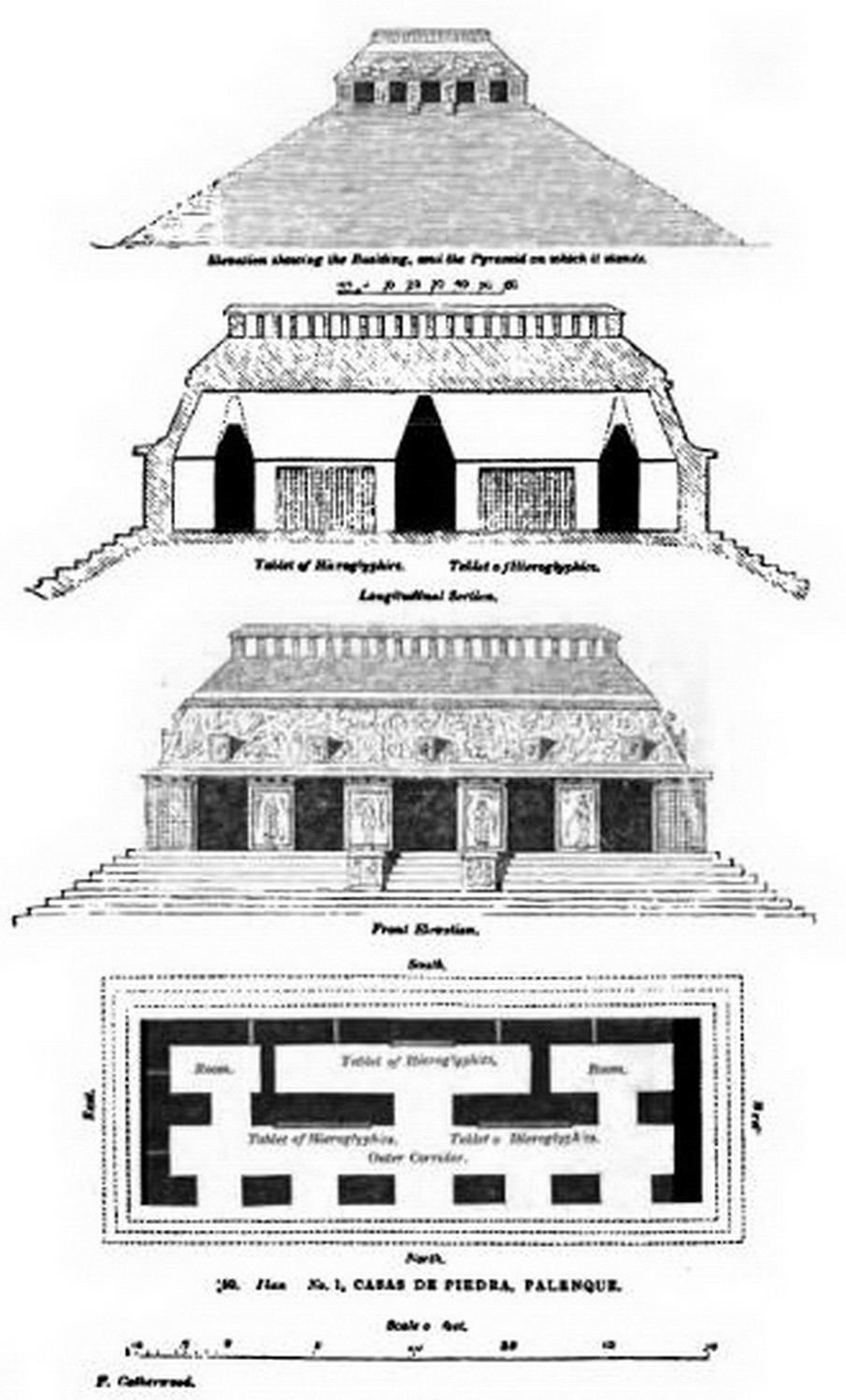
Plan of the temple by Frederick Catherwood

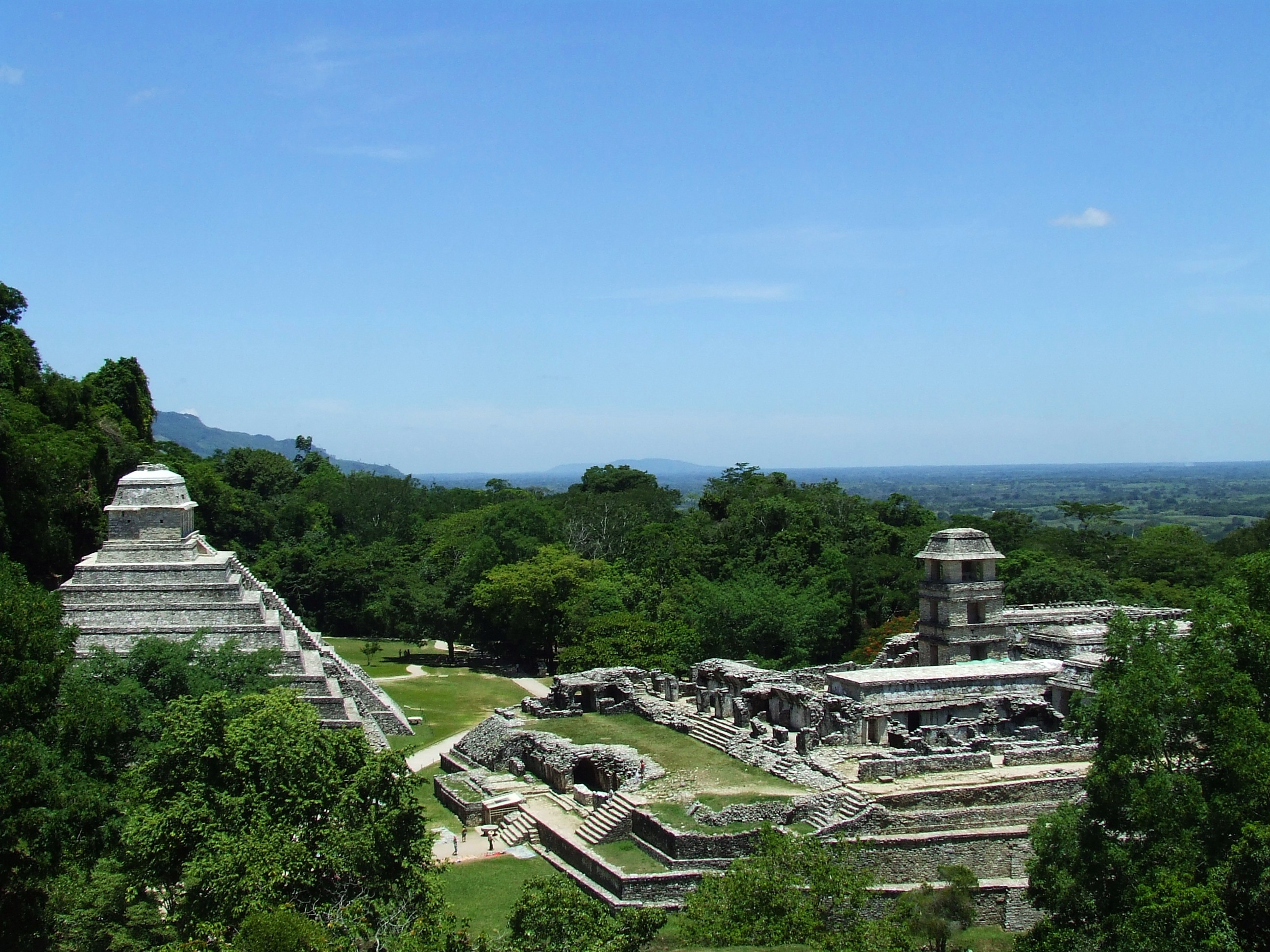
Temple of the Inscriptions (left) and a palace (right)

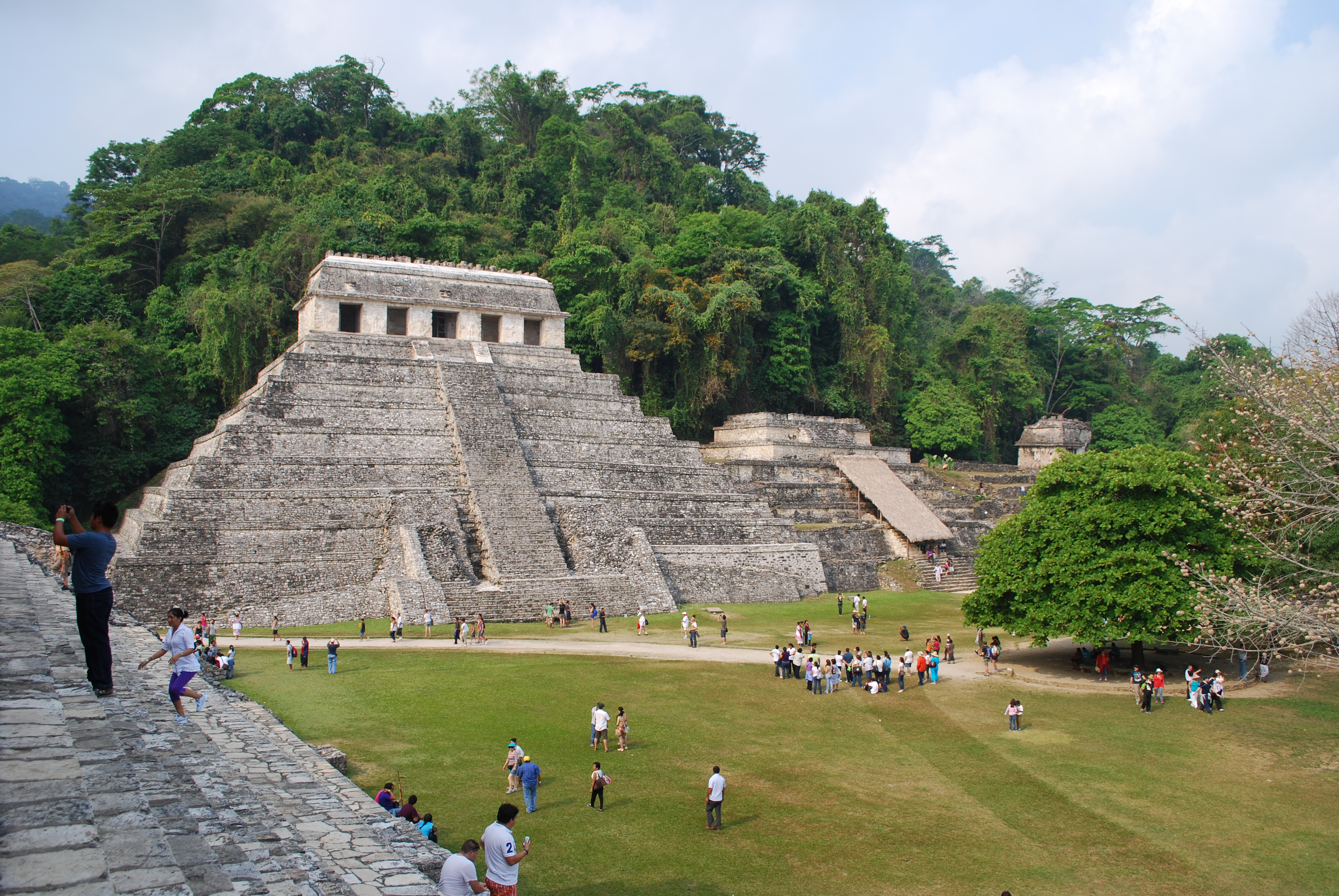
Side view

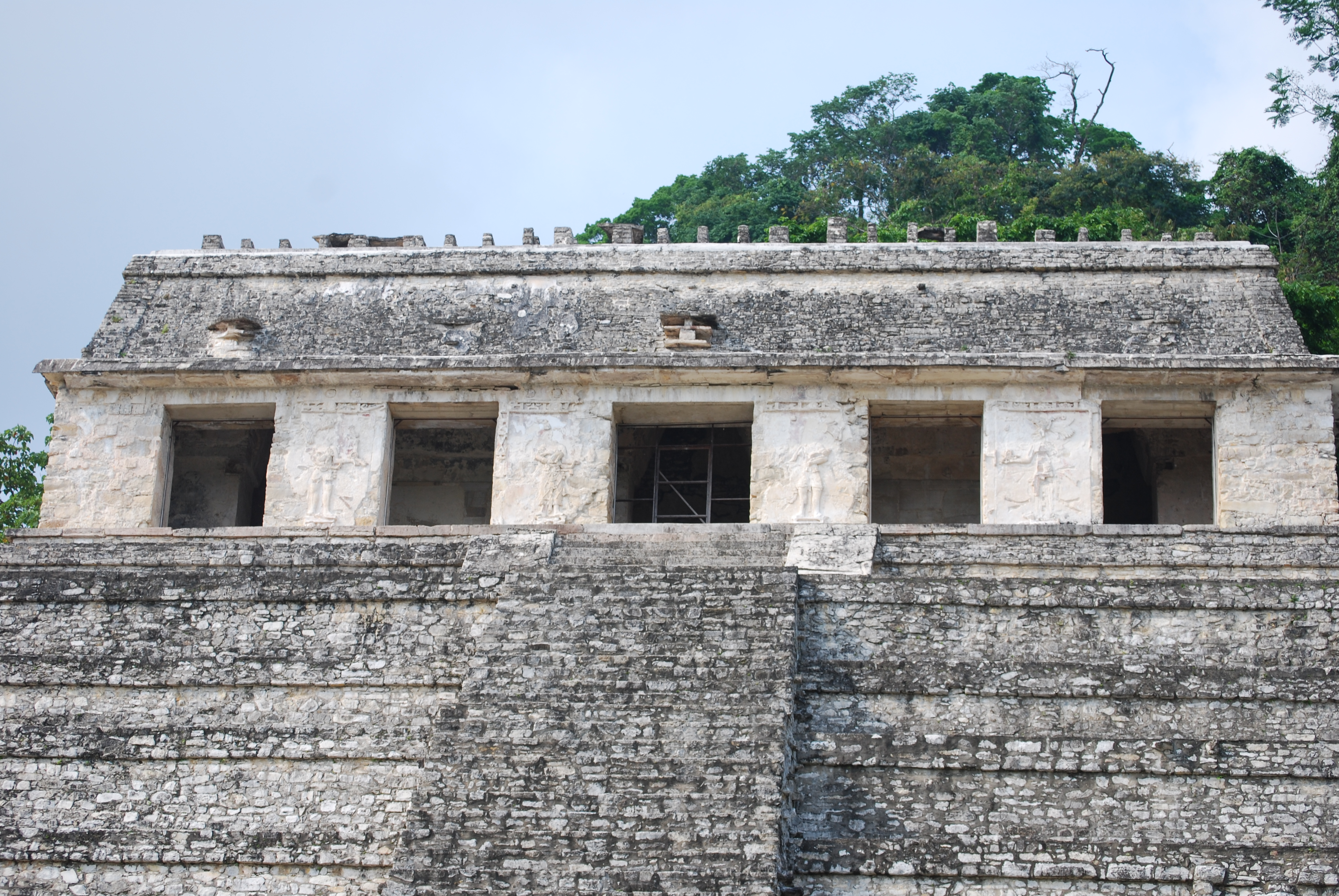
Facade

=== Pier A ===
Pier A's decoration consists entirely of hieroglyphic text. However, only eleven glyphs and glyph portions survive to this day. Among these glyphs, “capture” can be clearly seen, but who or what was captured is unknown because the corresponding glyphs are unreadable.

=== Pier B ===
Pier B depicts a scene in which a human figure holds the “child” God K, one of whose legs is a serpent, in his hand.

The human figure is actually life size (165 cm tall), but its position and perspective make it appear much larger. It wears an elaborate feather headdress, a jaguar skin skirt, and a belt. The figure also used to wear a loincloth and a short beaded cape, but due to damage those are largely missing today, as is the head of the figure.

It is thought that the figure held by the human figure is God K, although his characteristic “flared forehead” is only visible on Pier D. The figure of God K, often described as an “infant” or “child,” has one human leg and one serpent-leg. The human leg ends in a six-toed foot that is cradled by the other figure. It is likely, especially considering the emphasis placed on the polydactyly, that this feature is a reference to Pakal’s son, Kan B'alam II, who is portrayed in portraits with six fingers on one hand and six toes on one foot.

=== Pier C ===
The standing figure on Pier C is thought to be a woman, possibly Pakal’s mother, Lady Zac-Kuk. The appearance of the psychoduct (a hollow duct that goes from the outer temple into the tomb of Pakal) and the stone band that connects to it have led many to compare the structure to an umbilical cord. The fact that this “umbilical cord” connects the figure on Pier C to Pakal’s tomb (and by extension, Pakal himself) supports the identification of the figure as Lady Zac-Kuk. The umbilical cord can then be interpreted as a reference to the royal bloodline.

=== Pier D ===
Pier D provides the evidence that the “baby” figure is, in fact, God K. In this depiction of the “baby” figure, it wears an “axe” or “flare” including a mirror (visible below the feathers of the standing figure’s headdress), something characteristic of God K. The figure on this pier is more complete than the same figure on any of the other piers. Also present in the depiction of God K are three vertical cuts on the god’s back. These have been shown to be intentional, but their meaning is still unknown.

=== Pier E ===
The standing figure on Pier E is most likely Kan Bahlam I. The elaborate headdress worn by the figure contains glyphs that identify him as “chan-bahlum.” It is unlikely that this refers to Kan B'alam II because he is thought to be represented by the figure of God K. Because Kan Bʼalam II, great-great-grandson of Kan Bʼalam I, finished the decoration of the Temple of Inscriptions, this can be seen as an effort to reinforce the legitimacy of his claim to the throne; he is emphasizing his relationship to his ancestor and namesake, as well as his relationship to his father and grandmother.

=== Pier F ===
Pier F has only one glyph block that remains today. It contains glyphs for what is thought to be a title, translated as “dead rabbit”, followed by the title and name “Kinich Kan-B'alam,” after which comes an unknown glyph (possibly another title), and the glyph for Palenque.

=== Coloration ===
Although much of the color on the piers has deteriorated, some is still visible today. Originally, the piers would have been extraordinarily colorful. Bright red, yellow, and blue would have been seen on their stucco sculpture. A thin coat of light red paint would have been applied to all of the stucco sculpture as a sort of background coloring while the stucco was still wet, binding the color to the building. Because the temple was repeatedly repainted, one can observe layers of pigment between layers of stucco. The color blue signified the Heavens and the Gods and would have been applied to things relating to the gods, as well as the glyphic texts on the sculpture. The color yellow related to Xibalba, the Maya underworld, which was associated with jaguars, so the jaguar skirts were colored accordingly.

== Inscription tablets ==
The Temple of Inscriptions gets its name from three hieroglyphic tablets, known as the East Tablet, the Central Tablet, and the West Tablet, on the temple's inner walls. These tablets emphasize the idea that events that happened in the past will be repeated on the same calendar date, a theme also found in the Books of Chilam Balam, and constitute one of the longest known Maya inscriptions (617 glyphs). Columns E through F mark the beginning of a record of various events in Pakal's life that continues until the last two columns on the tablets, which announce his death and name Kan B'alam II as his heir. All of the tablets, excluding the final two columns, were completed during Pakal's lifetime.

== The tomb of Pakal ==
=== Structure ===
To prevent the collapse of the tomb due to the immense weight of the pyramid, the architects designed the hut-shaped chamber using cross vaulting and recessed buttresses.

=== Artifacts ===
The tomb of Pakal yielded several important archaeological finds and works of art.

==== Sarcophagus ====
Among these finds was the lid of Pakal’s sarcophagus. In the image that covers it, Pakal lies on top of the “earth monster.” Below him are the open jaws of a jaguar, symbolizing Xibalba. Above him is the Celestial Bird, perched atop the Cosmic Tree (represented by a cross) which, in turn, holds a Serpent in its branches. Thus, in the image Pakal lies between two worlds: the heavens and the underworld. Also on the sarcophagus are Pakal’s ancestors, arranged in a line going back six generations. Merle Greene Robertson is the only one to have ever photographed the sarcophagus lid. She was suspended from the ceiling in order to photograph it. Afterwards, the tomb was resealed and has not been reopened since.

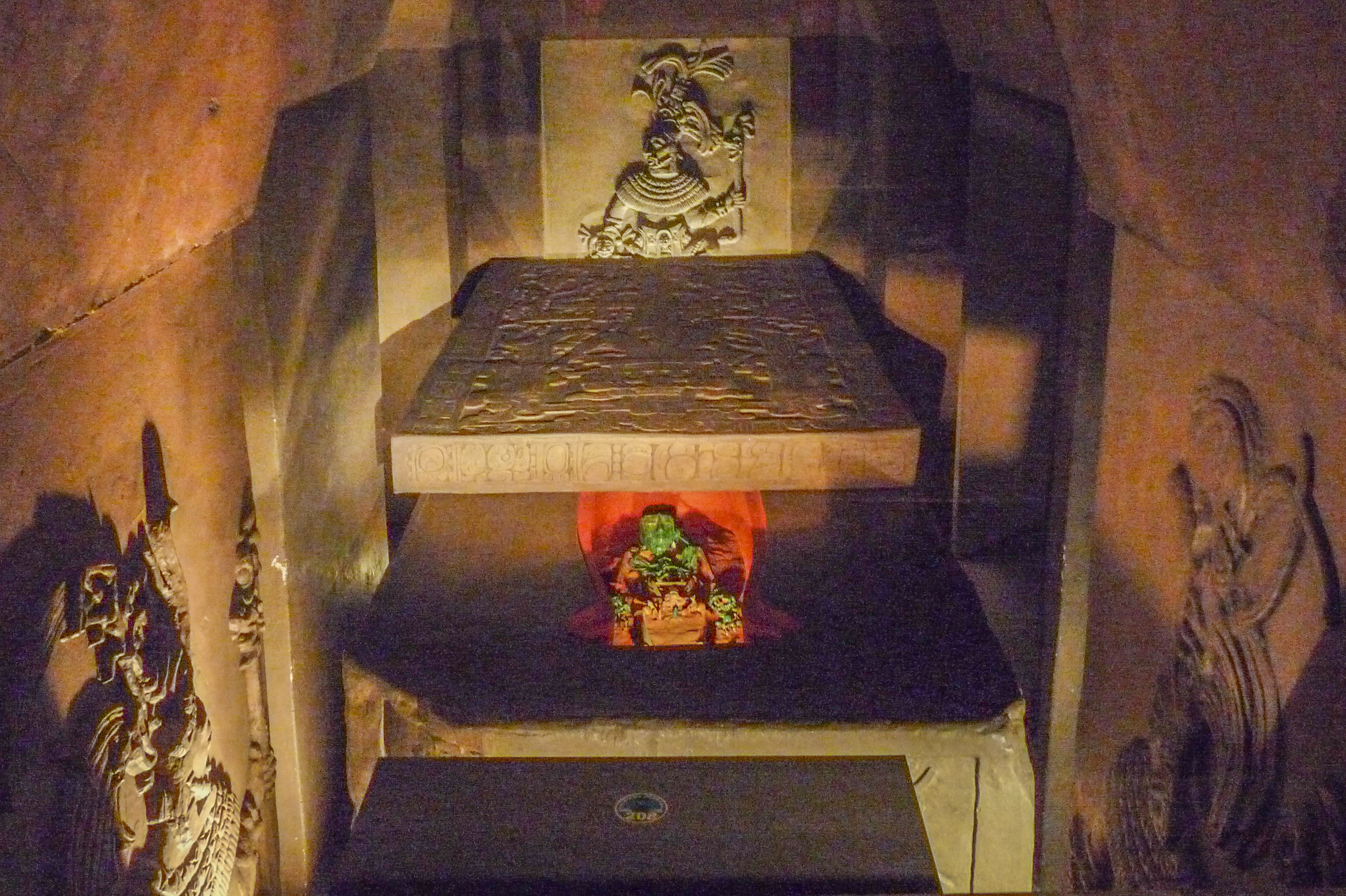
Reproduction of the Pakal's sarcophagus ( Museo Nacional de Antropología ) in Mexico

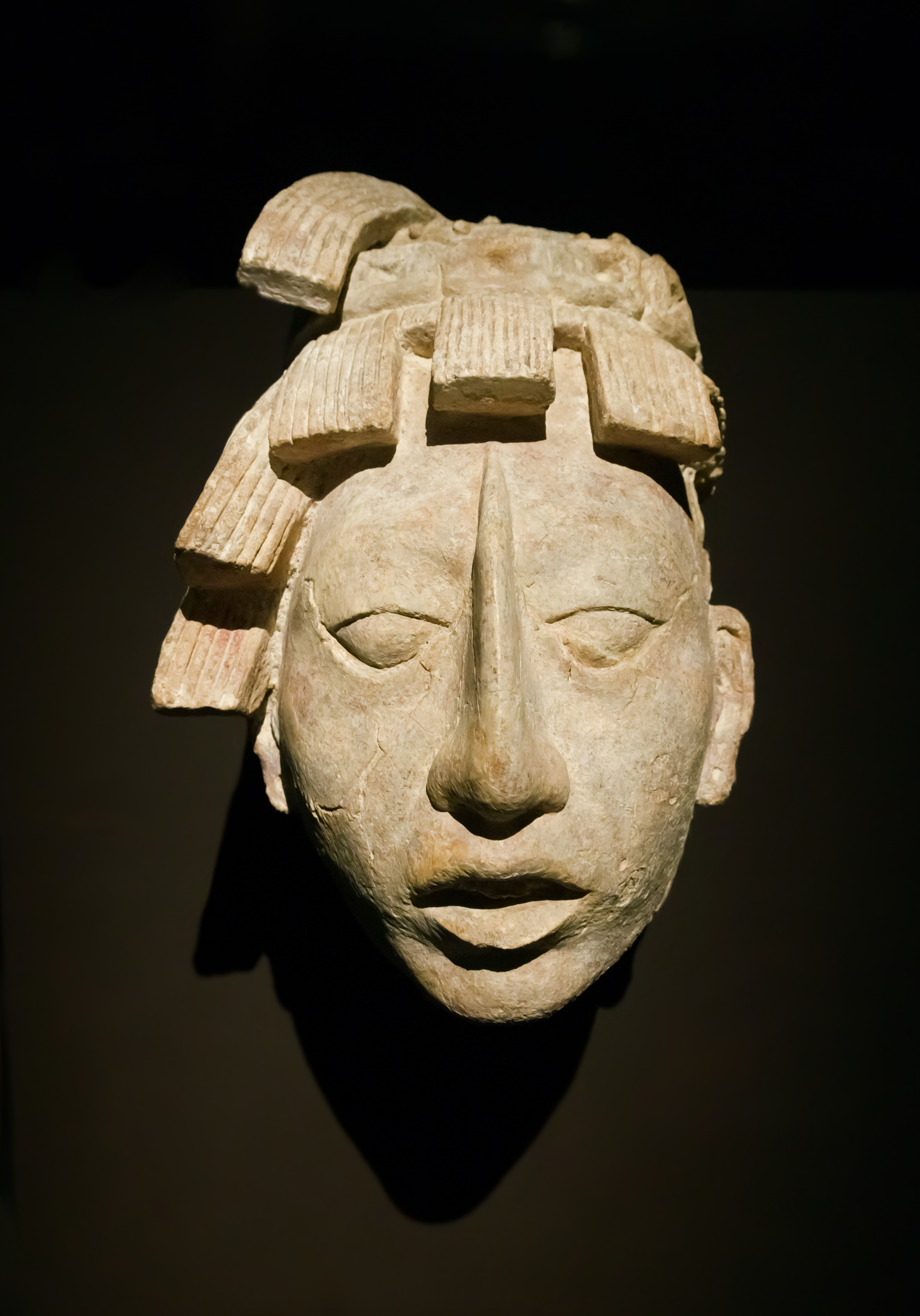
Head of king Pakal, teenager. Stucco.

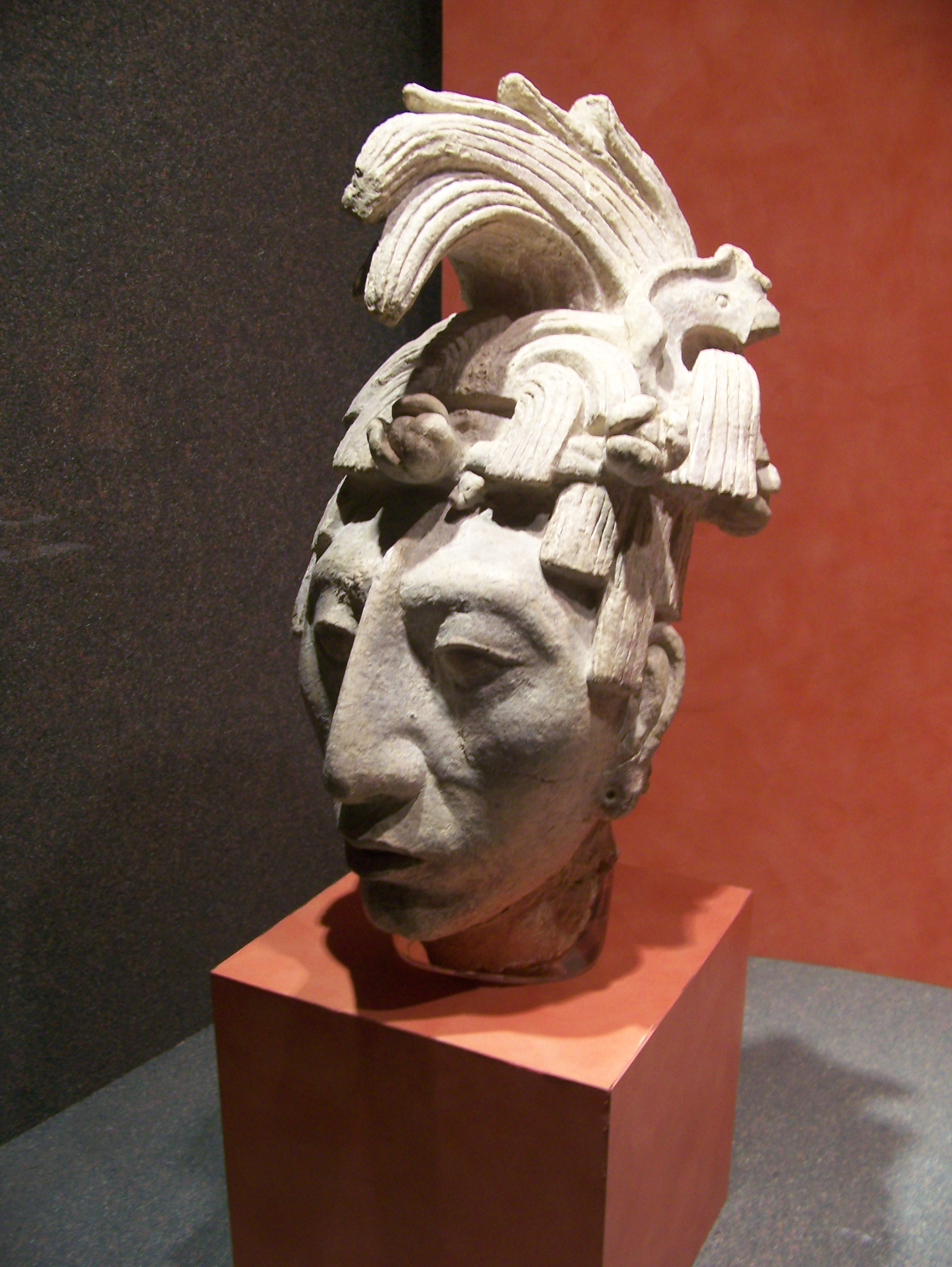
Stucco head of K'inich Janaab Pakal I (603-683 AD)

The lid of the sarcophagus

==== Other ====
Pakal’s death mask is another extraordinary artifact found in the tomb. The face of the mask is made entirely of jade, while the eyes consist of shells, mother of pearl, and obsidian.

There were several smaller jade heads packed into Pakal’s sarcophagus and a stucco portrait of the king was found under the base of it.

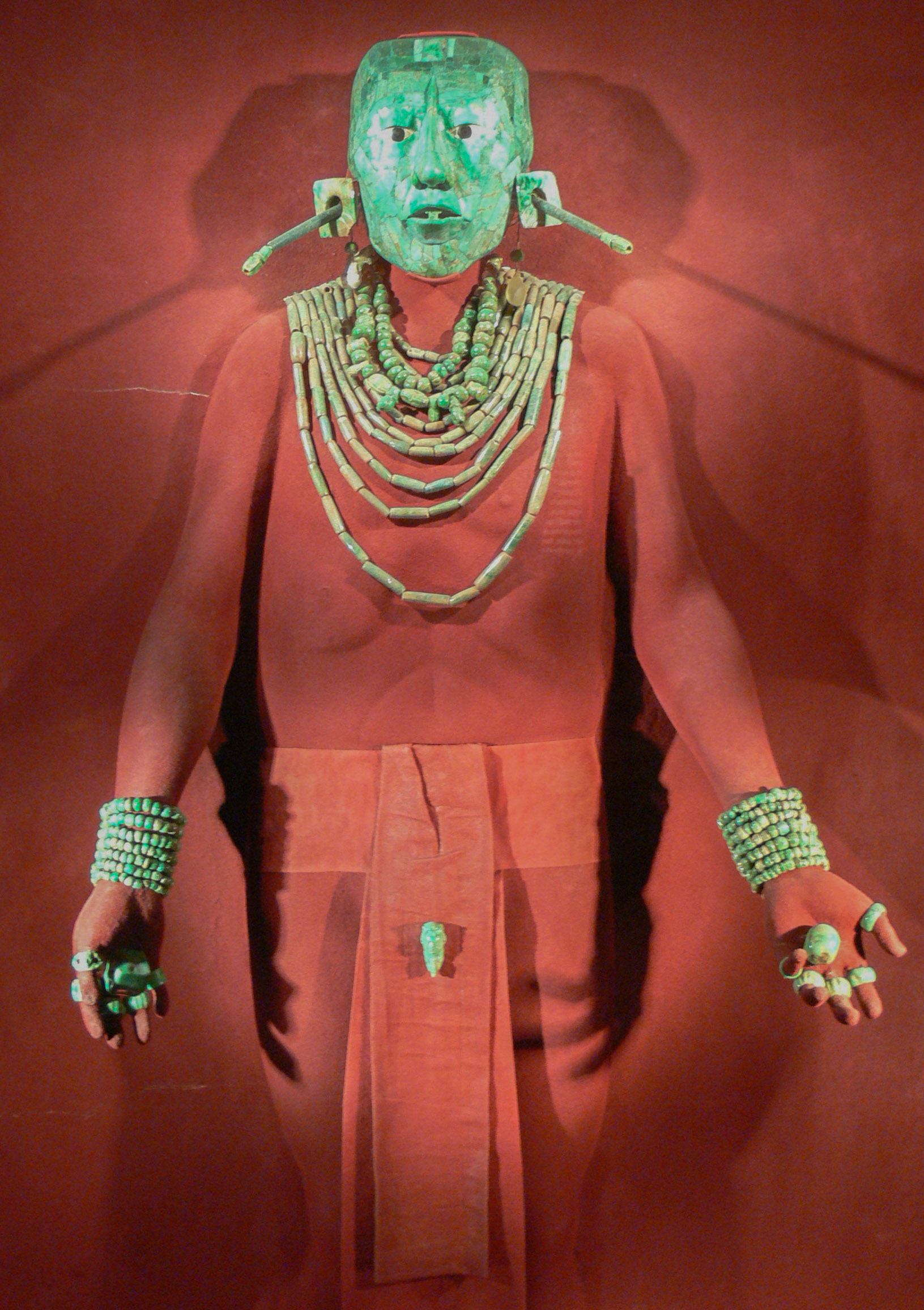
Funerary dress of king Pakal

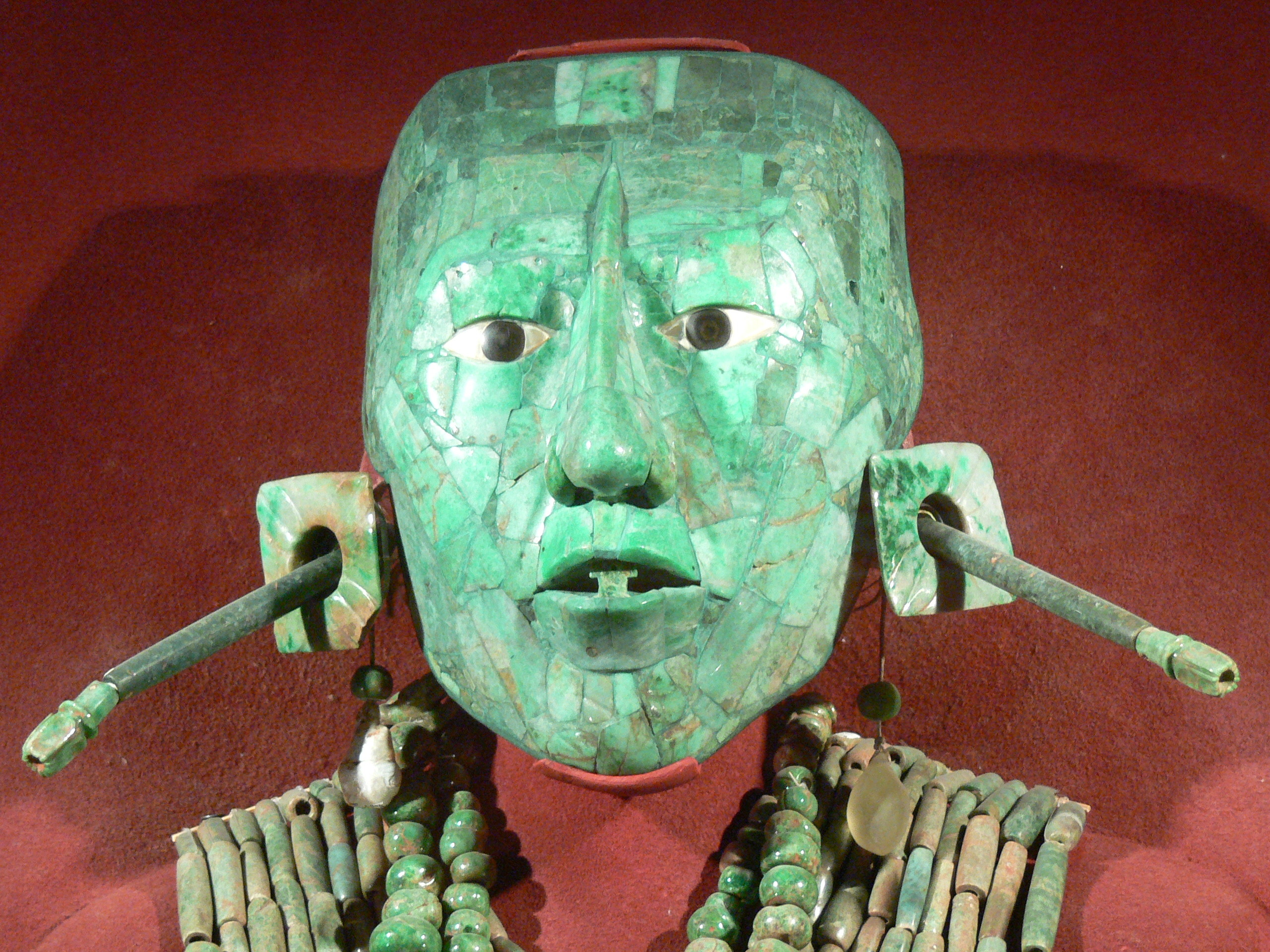
Funerary mask of king Pakal

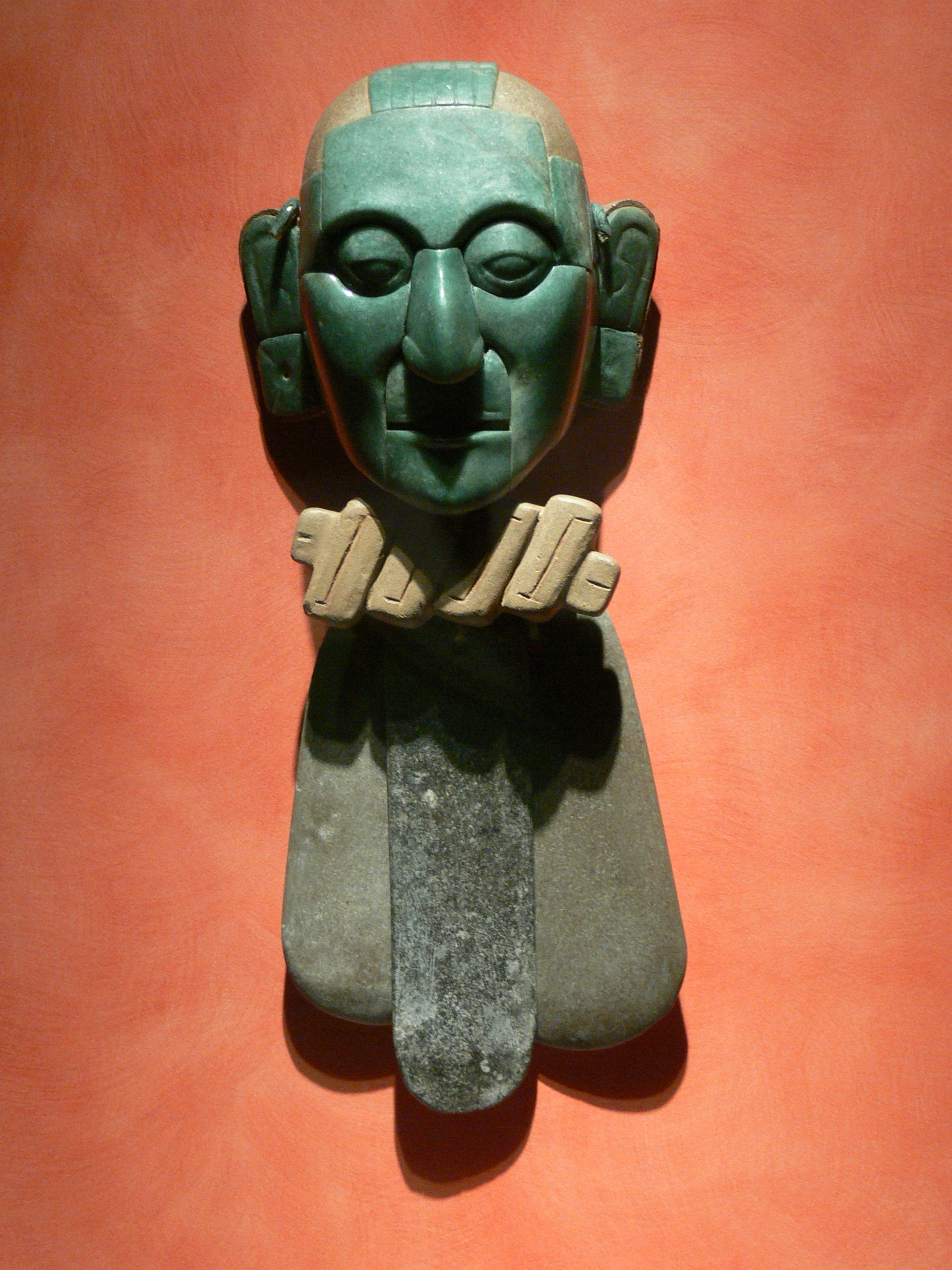
Funerary offering for king Pakal

Five skeletons, both male and female, were found at the entrance of the crypt. These sacrificial victims were intended to follow Pakal into Xibalba.

== See also ==
- El Castillo, Chichen Itza
- List of Mesoamerican pyramids
- Pyramid of the Magician at Uxmal
- Tikal Temple I
- Tikal Temple II
- Tikal Temple III
- Tikal Temple IV
- Tikal Temple V

== Notes ==
All information on the piers was taken from Robertson 1983: 29-53.
