= Tinum =

Tinum may refer to:

- Diocese of Tinum, a Catholic see in today's Knin, in Dalmatia, Croatia
- Tinúm, a town and municipality in Yucatán, Mexico
