= Jade mask of Pakal =

Mayan artifact found in Mexico

Mask of Pakal
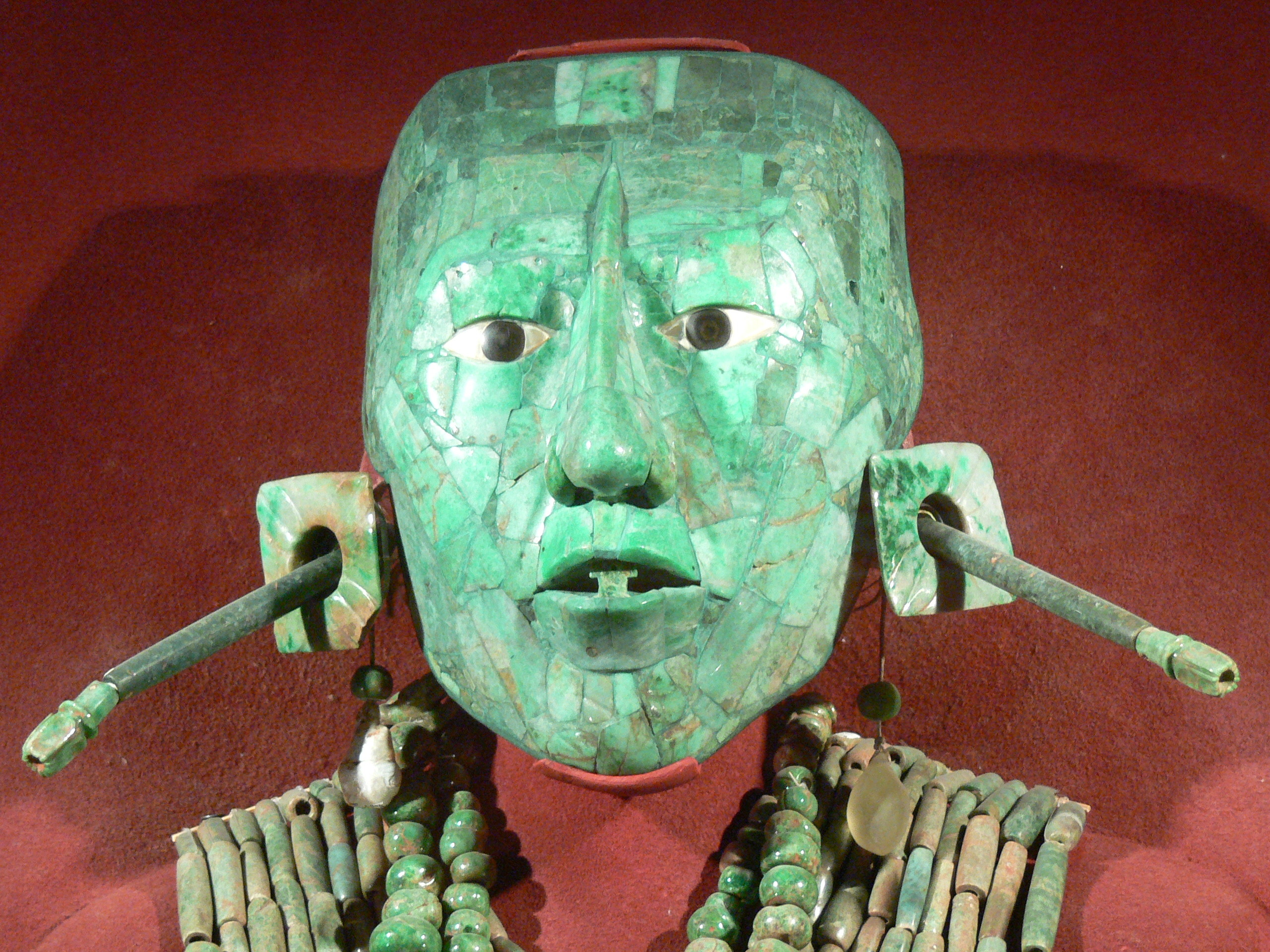
- Jade mask of Pakal on display at the National Anthropology Museum in Mexico City
- Material: Jade
- Height: 25.6 cm (10.1 in)
- Width: 18.8 cm (7.4 in)
- Created: 683
- Discovered: 1952; Temple of the Inscriptions, Palenque
- Present location: National Anthropology Museum, Mexico City
- Period: Classic
- Culture: Maya

The Mask of Pakal is a funerary jade mask found in the tomb of the Mayan king, K’inich Janaab’ Pakal inside the Temple of the Inscriptions at the Maya city of Palenque in Chiapas, Mexico.

Considered a master piece of Mesoamerican and Maya art, the mask is made with over 346 green jade stone fragments, the eyes are made with shell, nacre and the pupils with obsidian stone.

The mask of Pakal is part of the permanent collection of the National Museum of Anthropology in Mexico City and it is exhibited at the Maya Room of the museum along a reconstruction of K'inich Janaab' Pakal burial chamber.

== Discovery ==
The tomb of K'inich Janaab' Pakal was discovered in 1952 by archaeologist Alberto Ruz Lhuillier on a large burial chamber inside the Temple of Inscriptions of Palenque.

The burial was inside a colossal stone sarcophagus with maya inscriptions and a carved mythological representation of Pakal. The skeletal remains showed K'inich Janaab' Pakal wearing the jade mask along with a fine funeral trousseau that included jade necklaces and bracelets and more jade in his hands.
