= El Castillo, Chichen Itza =

Step pyramid in the Mayan city of Chichen Itza in Tinúm, Mexico

- North-west view of El Castillo

- Location within Mesoamerica Location within Yucatán (state)
- Ancient name: Kukulcan
- Constructed: 8th–12th century CE; 826 years ago
- Type: Mesoamerican step pyramid
- Material: Limestone
- Height: 24 m (79 ft), without temple 30 m (98 ft), with temple 6 m (20 ft), temple itself
- Base: 55.3 m (181 ft)
- Slope: 37°29'44" (edges); 47º19'50" (sides)

UNESCO World Heritage Site
- Location: Tinum Municipality, Yucatán, Mexico
- Part of: Pre-Hispanic City of Chichen-Itza
- Criteria: Cultural: (i), (ii), (iii)
- Reference: 483
- Inscription: 1988 (12th Session)
- Coordinates: 20°40′58.4″N 88°34′7.0″W

El Castillo (Spanish pronunciation: [el kas'tiʎo], 'the Castle'), also known as the Temple of Kukulcán, is a Mesoamerican step-pyramid that dominates the center of the Chichen Itza archaeological site in the Mexican state of Yucatán. The temple building is more formally designated by archaeologists as Chichen Itza Structure 5B18.

== Structure ==
Built by the pre-Columbian Maya civilization sometime between the 8th and 12th centuries CE, the building served as a temple to the deity Kukulcán, the Yucatec Maya Feathered Serpent deity closely related to Quetzalcoatl, a deity known to the Aztecs and other central Mexican cultures of the Postclassic period. It has a substructure that likely was constructed several centuries earlier for the same purpose.

The temple consists of a series of square terraces with stairways up each of the four sides to the temple on top. Sculptures of plumed serpents run down the sides of the northern balustrade. Around the spring and autumn equinoxes, the late afternoon sun strikes off the northwest corner of the temple and casts a series of triangular shadows against the northwest balustrade, creating the illusion of the feathered serpent "crawling" down the temple. To contemporary visitors, the event has been very popular and is witnessed by thousands at the spring equinox, but it is not known whether the phenomenon is a result of a purposeful design since the light-and-shadow effect can be observed without major changes during several weeks near the equinoxes.

All four sides of the temple have approximately 91 steps which, when added together and including the temple platform on top as the final "step", may produce a total of 365 steps (the steps on the south side of the temple are eroded). That number is equal to the number of days of the Haabʼ year and likely is significantly related to rituals.

The structure is 24 m (79 ft) high, plus an additional 6 m (20 ft) for the temple at the top. The square base measures 55.3 m (181 ft) across.

== Construction ==
The construction of the Temple of Kukulcán ("El Castillo"), like other Mesoamerican temples, likely reflected the common practice by the Maya of executing several phases of construction for their temples. The last construction probably took place between 900–1000 CE, while the substructure may have been constructed earlier, between 600–800 CE. Based on archaeological research, construction of the Temple of Kukulcán was based on the concept of axis mundi. Anthropologists think that the site remained sacred regardless of how the structure was positioned on the location. When a temple structure was renewed, the former construction was destroyed using a ritual that involved resolving the space of spiritual forces to preserve its sacredness. It is estimated that this last construction dates to the 11th century CE. The older, inner temple is referred to as the "substructure".

During the 1930s restoration work, an entryway was cut into the balustrade of the northeastern exterior staircase to provide access to archaeologists, and later for tourists for the rest of the 20th century.

== Interior ==
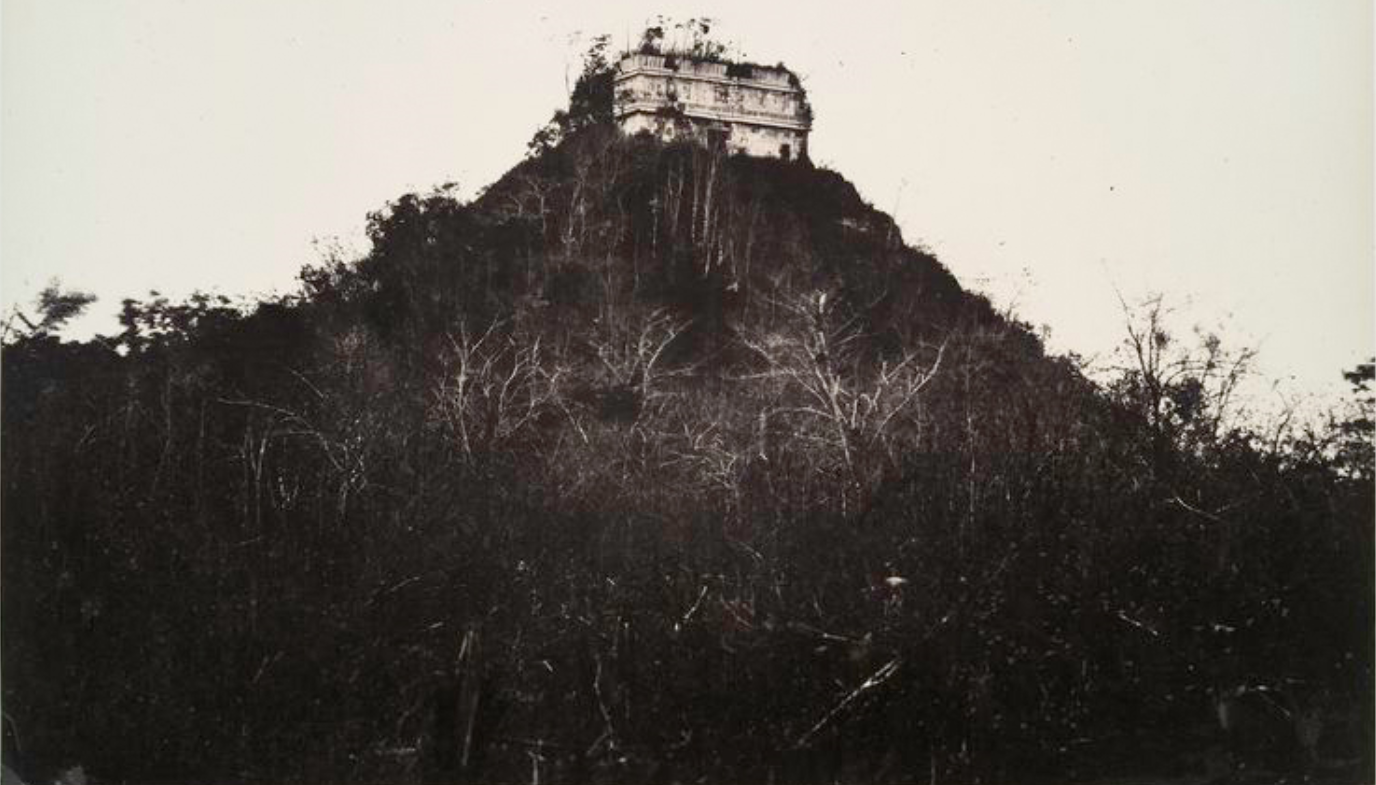
Temple of Kukulcán before excavation (1863).

In 1566, the temple was described by Friar Diego de Landa in the manuscript known as Yucatán at the Time of the Spanish Encounter (Relación de las cosas de Yucatán). Almost three centuries later, John Lloyd Stephens described the architecture of the temple with even more detail in his book Incidents of Travel in Yucatán (Incidentes del viaje Yucatán), published in 1843. At that time, the archaeological site of Chichén Itzá was located on an estate, also called Chichén Itzá, owned by Juan Sosa. Frederick Catherwood illustrated the book with lithographs depicting the temple covered in abundant vegetation on all sides. Some photographs taken in the beginning of the 20th century also show the temple partially covered by said vegetation.

In 1924, the Carnegie Institution for Science in Washington, D.C. requested permission from the Mexican government to carry out explorations and restoration efforts in and around the area of Chichen Itza. In 1927, with the assistance of Mexican archaeologists, they started the task. In April 1931, looking to confirm the hypothesis that the structure of the temple of Kukulcán was built on top of a much older temple, the work of excavation and exploration began in spite of generalized beliefs contrary to that hypothesis. On June 7, 1932, a box with coral, obsidian, and turquoise encrusted objects was found alongside human remains, which are exhibited in the National Anthropology Museum in Mexico City.

The Temple of Kukulcán (El Templo) is located above a cavity filled with water, labeled a sinkhole or cenote. Recent archaeological investigations suggest that an earlier construction phase is located closer to the southeastern cenote, rather than being centered. This specific proximity to the cenote suggests that the Maya may have been aware of the cenote’s existence and purposefully constructed it there to facilitate their religious beliefs.

In April 1935, after extensive excavation work, a Chac Mool statue, with its nails, teeth, and eyes inlaid with mother of pearl was found inside the temple. The room where the discovery was made was nicknamed the "Hall of offerings" or "North Chamber". After more than a year of excavation, in August 1936, a second room was found, only meters away from the first. Inside this room, dubbed the "Chamber of Sacrifices", archaeologists found two parallel rows of human bone set into the back wall, as well as a red jaguar statue. Both deposits of human remains were found oriented north-northeast. Researchers concluded that there must be an inner temple approximately 33 m (108 ft) wide, shaped similarly to the outer temple, with nine steps and a height of 17 m (56 ft) up to the base of the temple where the Chac Mool and the jaguar were found.

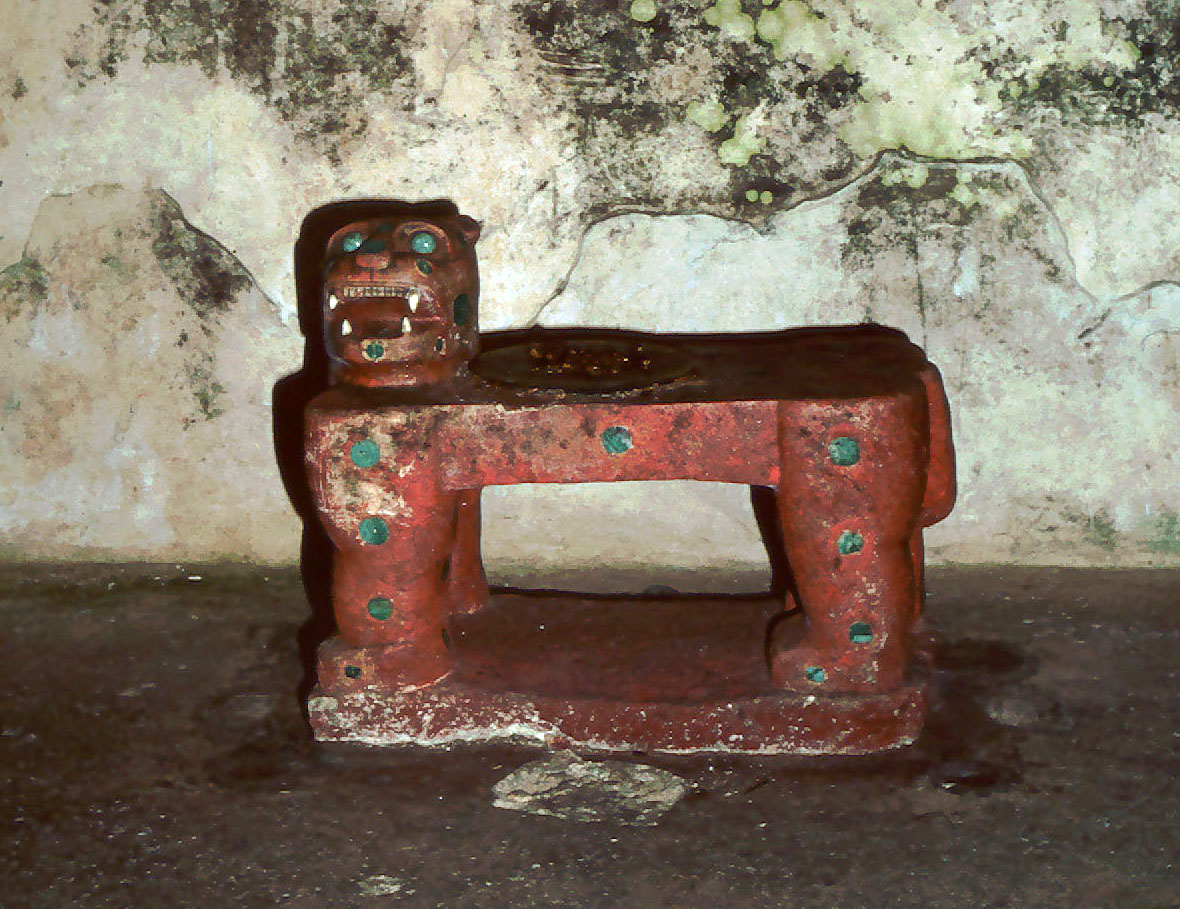
The Red Jaguar Throne found in what is described as the throne room of the Temple of Kukulcán at the Chichen Itza archaeological site.

What appears to be a throne (referred to as the "Red Jaguar Throne") was discovered in the room described as the throne room. The jaguar throne was previously presumed to have been decorated with flint and green stone discs, but recent research has determined the jaguar to be composed of highly symbolic and valued materials for ritualistic significance. The use of x-ray fluorescence (XRF) was used to determine that the sculpture is painted red with a pigment that includes cinnabar, or mercury sulfide (HgS). Cinnabar was not in accessible proximity to Chichén Itzá, so its transport through long-distance trade would have placed a high value on it. Additionally, the color red appears to have been significant to Maya cultural symbolism. It is associated with creating life as well as death and sacrifice. Studies suggest that objects in Maya culture were imbued with vital essence, so the choice of painting the jaguar red could be a reflection of these beliefs, deeming the jaguar as an offering. The high status associated with the cinnabar pigment and its red tone suggest that the jaguar was linked to the ritual importance of closing a temple for renewal.

The four fangs of the Red Jaguar have been identified as gastropod mollusk shells (Lobatus costatus) using a digital microscope and comparative analysis from malacology experts from the National Institute of Anthropology and History. The shells also are thought to be another valued resource material that may have been traded into Chichén Itzá. The green stones were analyzed and determined to be a form of jadeite. Jadeite was valuable economically and socially, and the acquisition and application of the material is indicative of the access Chichén Itzá had along its trade routes.

Archaeological studies indicate that the Red Jaguar is similar to other depictions of thrones found in Maya murals (Temple of Chacmool), thus whoever was seated on this throne could have been accessing the point of axis mundi, which is essential to the elements and relationship to the cosmological system. The symbolic use of materials related to the underworld and death also suggest that it acted as an offering for ritually closing the temple.

== Alignment ==
The location of the temple within the site sits directly above a cenote, or water cave, and is aligned at the intersection between four other cenotes: the Sacred Cenote (North), Xtoloc (South), Kanjuyum (East), and Holtún (West). This alignment supports the position of the Temple of Kukulcán as an axis mundi. The western and eastern sides of the temple are angled to the zenith sunset and nadir sunrise, which may correspond with other calendar events such as the start of the traditional planting and harvesting seasons. An approximate correspondence with the Sun's positions on its zenith and nadir passages is likely coincidental, however, because very few Mesoamerican orientations match these events and even for such cases, different explanations are much more likely. Since the sunrise and sunset dates recorded by solar orientations that prevail in Mesoamerican architecture, tend to be separated by multiples of 13 and 20 days (i.e. of basic periods of the calendrical system), and given their clustering in certain seasons of the year, it has been argued that the orientations allowed the use of observational calendars intended to facilitate a proper scheduling of agricultural and related ritual activities. In agreement with this pattern, detected both in the Maya Lowlands and elsewhere in Mesoamerica, the north (and main) face of the temple of Kukulcán at Chichén Itzá has an azimuth of 111.72°, corresponding to sunsets on May 20 and July 24, separated by 65 and 300 days (multiples of 13 and 20). Significantly, the same dates are recorded by a similar temple at Tulum.

== Chirped echo ==
A handclap made near the foot of El Castillo's staircase returns as a brief descending frequency sweep. The sound has been compared with the call of the resplendent quetzal.

The staircase's repeated treads and risers form a periodically corrugated surface that has been modeled as an acoustic diffraction grating. Lubman attributed the presence, frequency, and descending trajectory of the chirp to periodic reflections from successive steps, while attributing its rich harmonic structure to the staircase acting as an acoustic analogue of an inclined optical Bragg diffraction grating.

More detailed diffraction simulations by Declercq and colleagues modeled the response to both an idealized delta-function-like pulse and a recorded handclap. In the resulting sonograms, the simulated echo generated from the handclap contained four frequency bands corresponding to those measured experimentally, whereas the idealized pulse produced only two prominent bands. The authors attributed the lower two experimental bands mainly to the spectral content of the handclap rather than to the diffraction process itself. Including reflections from the ground in front of the pyramid did not affect the presence or absence of the four bands.

Later in situ experiments used Gaussian pulses with different spectral distributions to examine how the effect varies with the sound source. Above a frequency related to the dimensions of the steps, the acoustic response became prolonged in the time domain and could form a frequency sweep containing one or more harmonics. Comparisons with a model based on a linear array of point sources related the response to the source's spectral distribution, the dimensions of the staircase, and the position of the receiver.

Bilsen later analyzed the echo in the time domain as a sequence of reflections from successive steps, producing a repetition pitch glide. Using the staircase dimensions and the source–receiver position, the model predicted a perceived pitch decreasing continuously from 796 to 471 Hz-equivalent over 177 milliseconds. Bilsen argued that a model based only on optical Bragg diffraction from a periodic structure did not satisfactorily explain the complete sonogram.

Lubman suggested that the Maya may have noticed and exploited the acoustic effect in ceremonies, and speculated that the staircase was intentionally designed to imitate the quetzal's call.

Comparison of approximate profiles of the El Castillo, Chichen Itza with some notable pyramidal or near-pyramidal buildings. Dotted lines indicate original heights, where data is available. In its SVG file, hover over a pyramid to highlight and click for its article.

== Recent developments ==
Around 2006, the National Institute of Anthropology and History (INAH), which manages the archaeological site of Chichen Itza, started closing monuments to the public. While visitors may walk around them, they may no longer climb them or enter the chambers. This followed a climber falling to her death.

Researchers discovered an enormous cenote (also known as a sinkhole) beneath the 1,000-year-old temple of Kukulcán. The forming sinkhole beneath the temple is approximately 82 by 114 feet (25 by 35 meters) and as many as 65 feet (20 meters) deep. The water filling the cavern is thought to run from north to south. They also found a layer of limestone approximately 16 feet (4.9 meters) thick at the top of the cenote, upon which the temple sits.

Recent archaeological investigations have used electrical resistivity tomography (ERT) to examine the construction sequence of Kukulcán. To preserve the site from potential damage, electrodes were placed non-traditionally as flat-based detectors around the quadrangle of the temple bodies. After each body of the temple was tested, the data revealed two previous construction phases within Kukulcán with a possible temple at the top of the second substructure. Determining the dates when these constructions happened will provide time periods of when Chichen Itza may have been significantly occupied.

== Gallery ==
Gallery

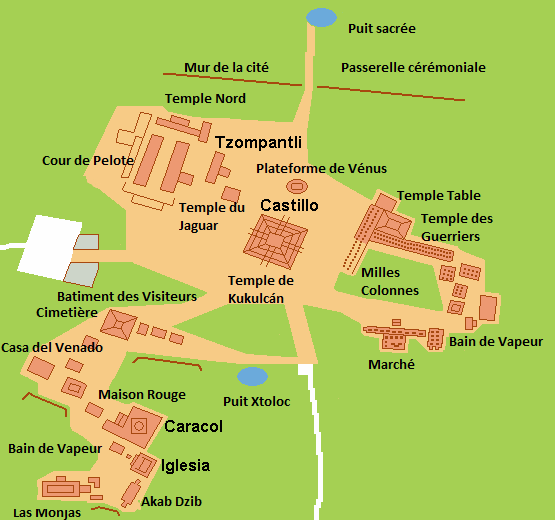
Situation map of Chichen Itza

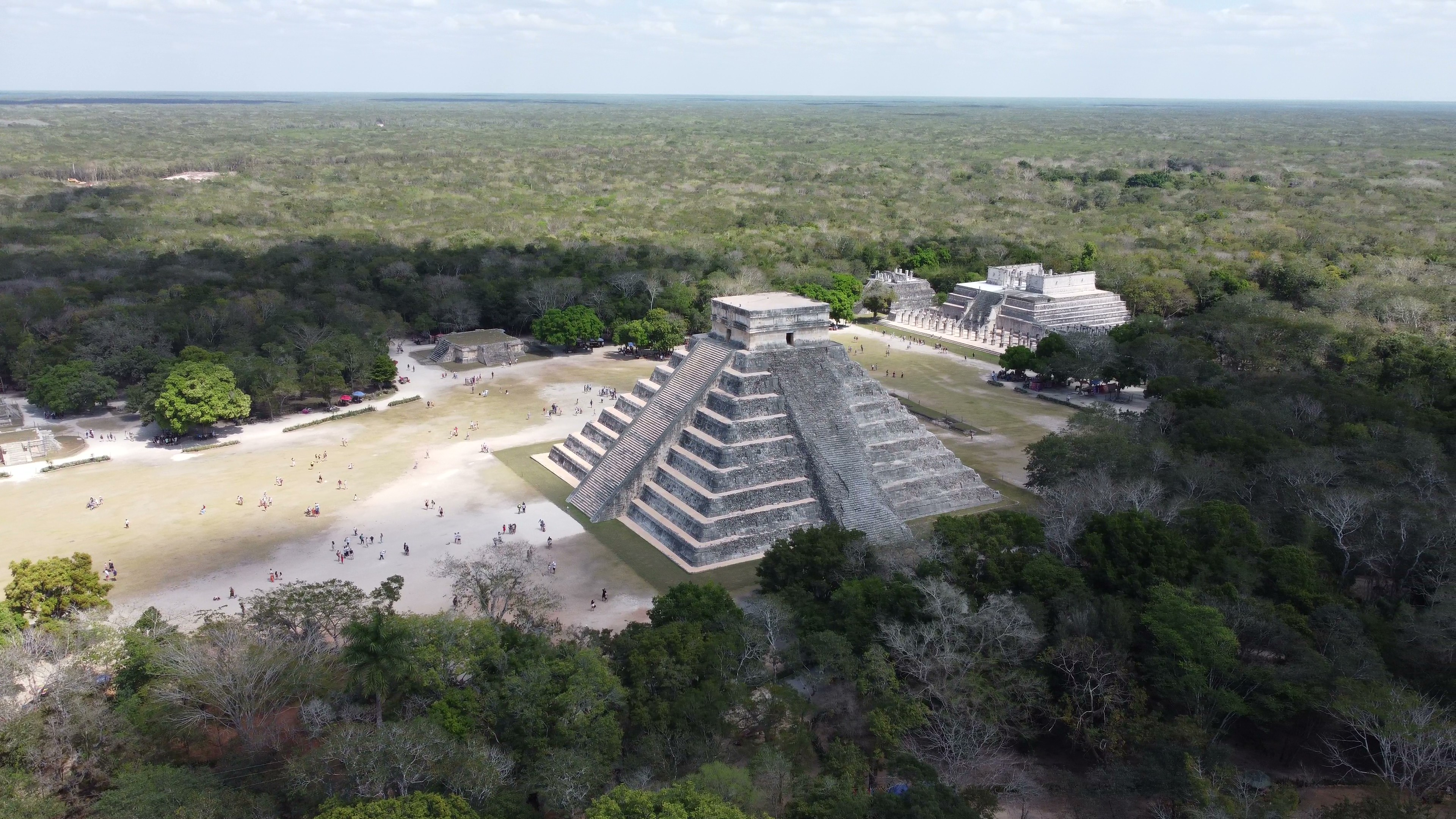
Aerial view of the Temple of Kukulcán

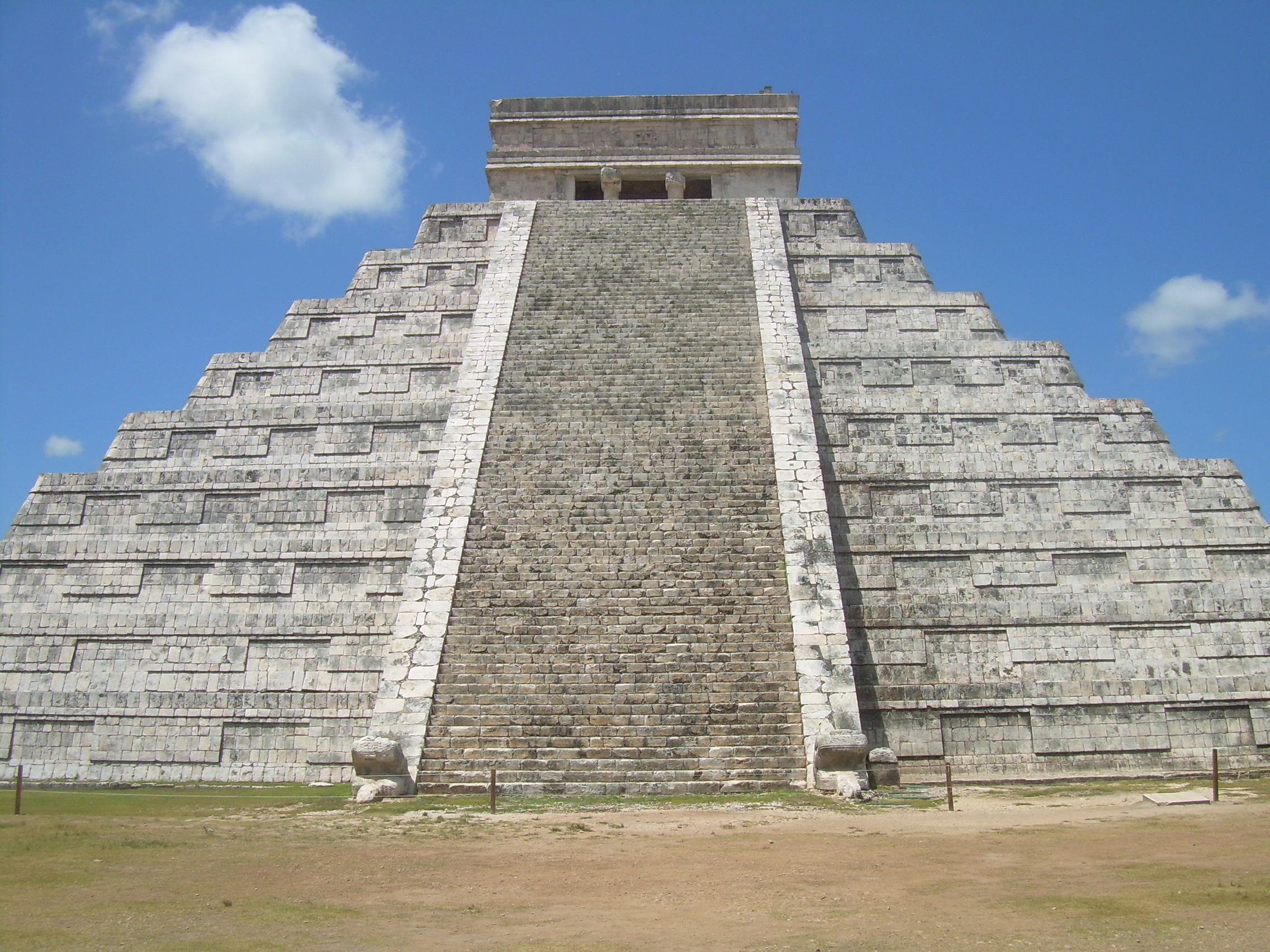
North side of the Temple of Kukulcán

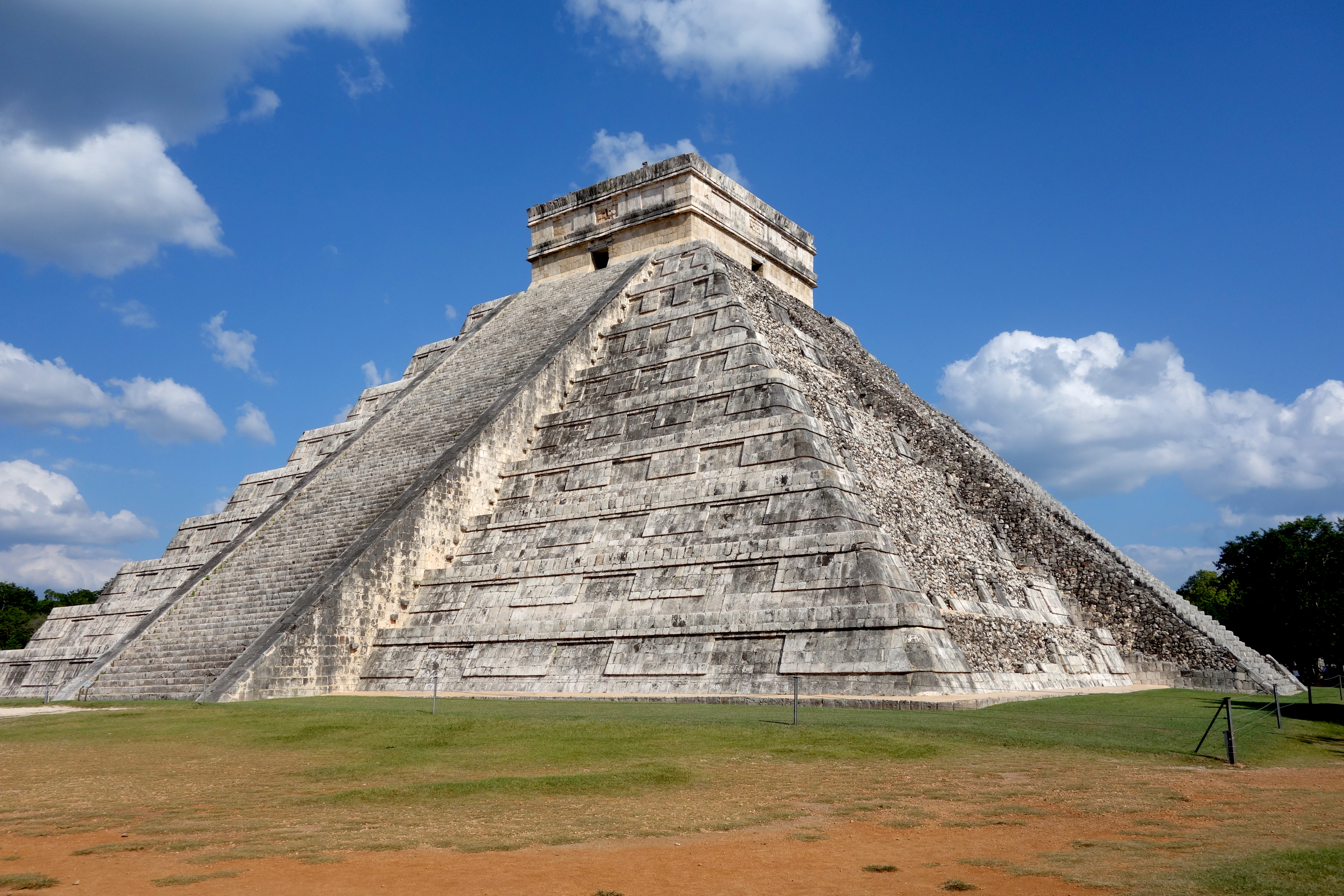
West side of the Temple of Kukulcán

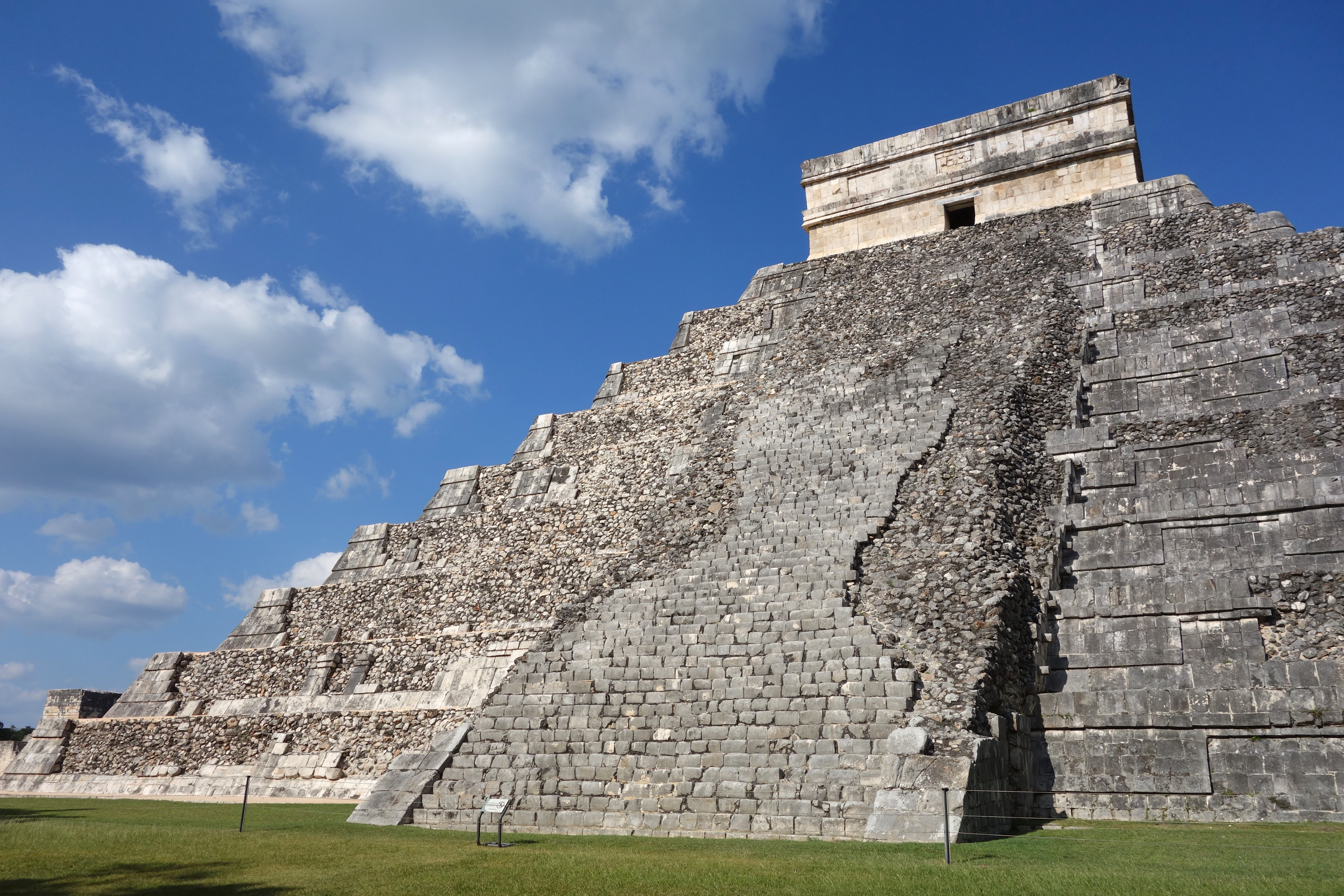
South side of the Temple of Kukulcán

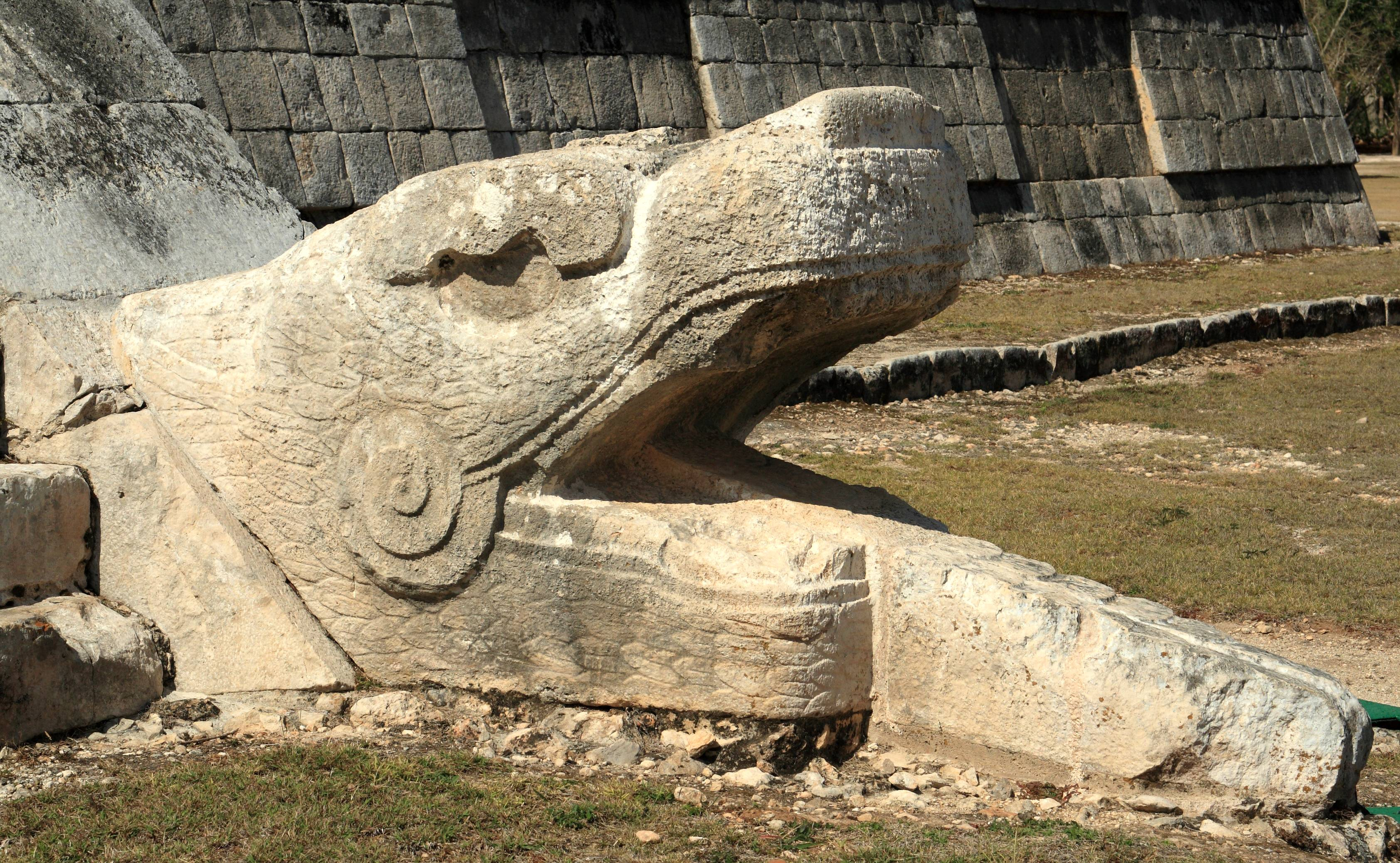
Plumed Serpent on Kukulcán

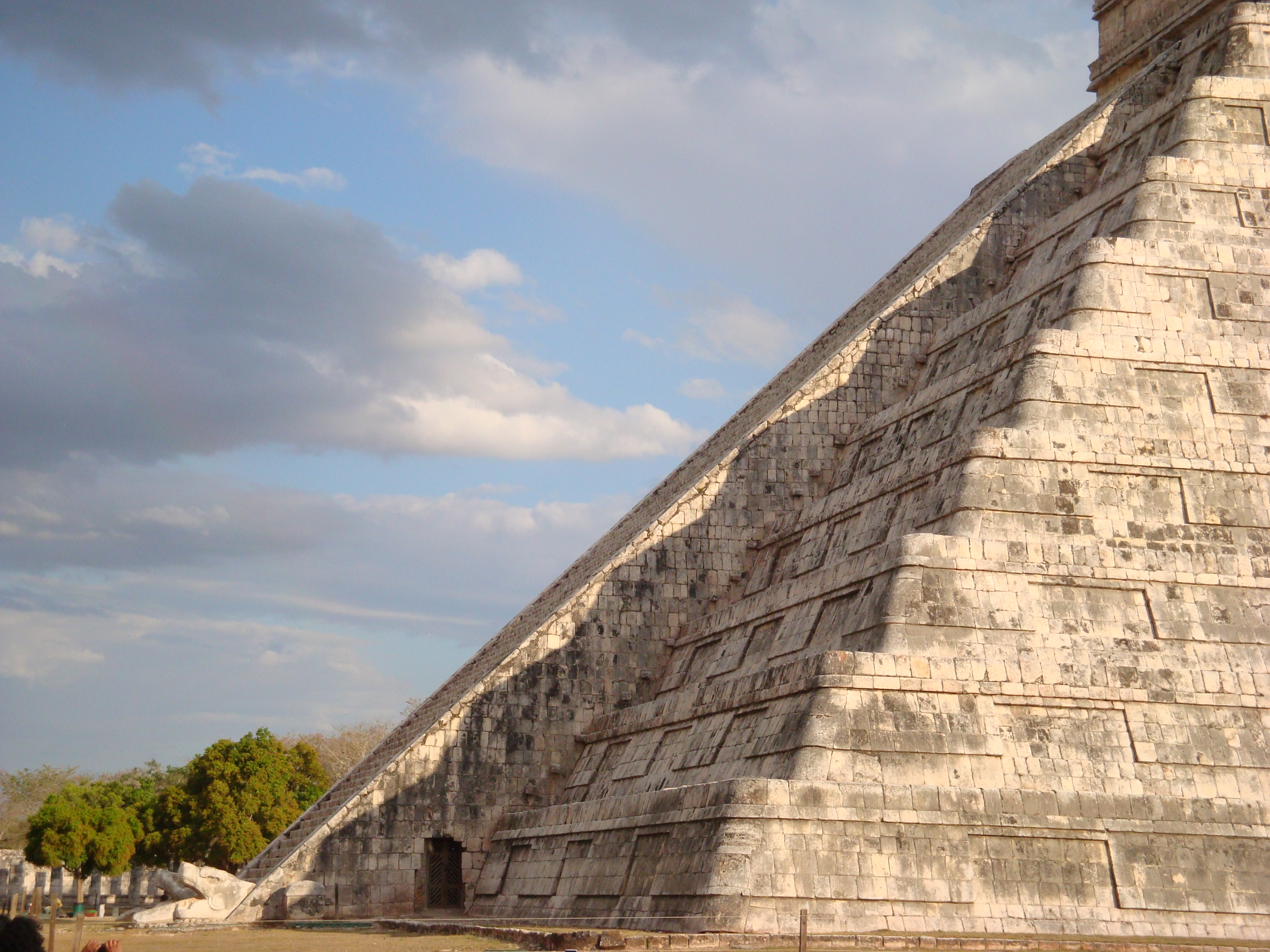
Shadows cast on Kukulcán during Equinox at Chichen Itza

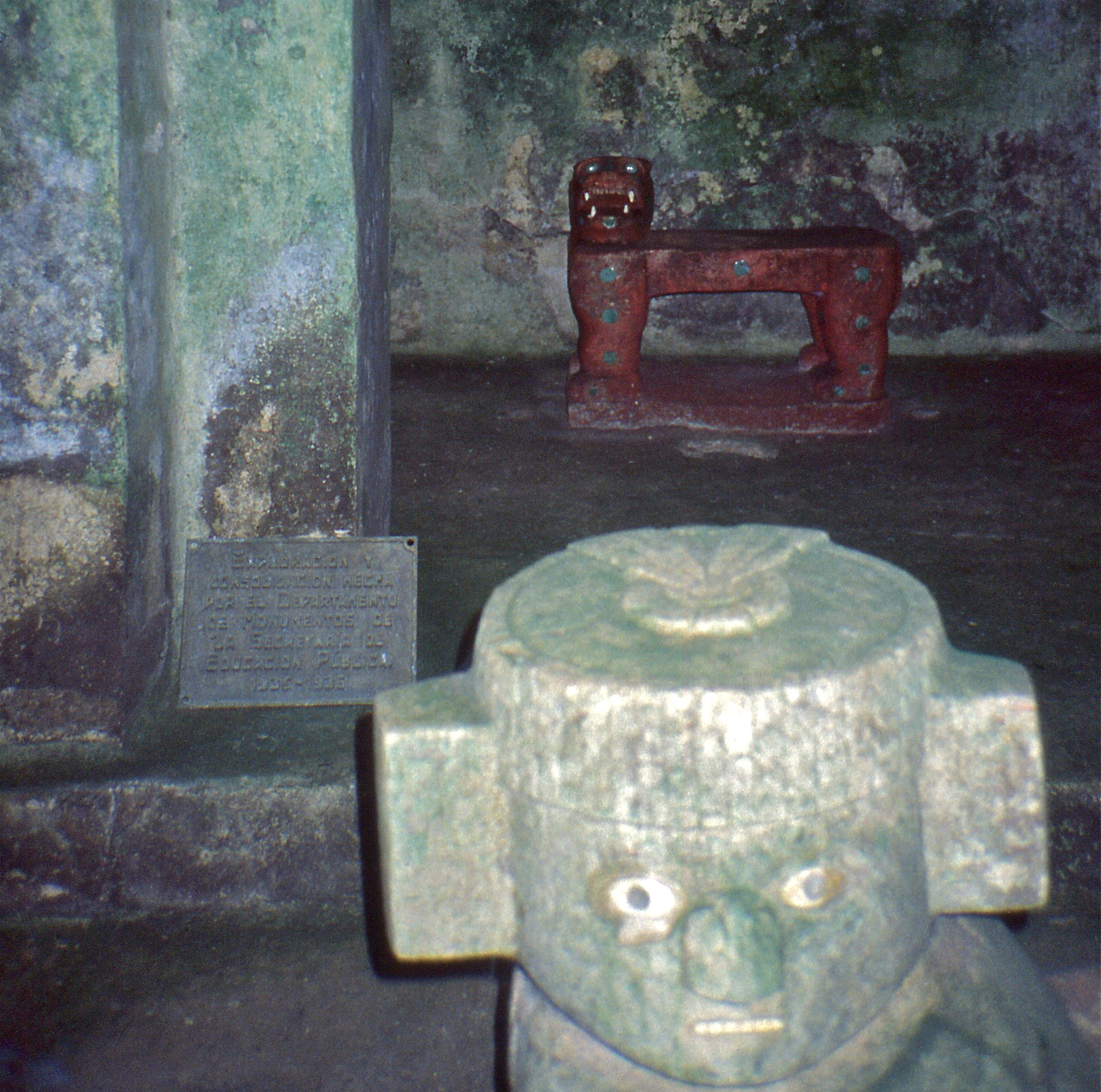
Interior. The Jaguar Throne inlaid with jade behind the Chac Mool ...(no longer on display since 2006)

== See also ==
- List of Mesoamerican pyramids
- Pyramid of the Magician at Uxmal
- Tikal Temple I
- Tikal Temple II
- Tikal Temple III
- Tikal Temple IV
- Tikal Temple V

== Bibliography ==
- Coe, Michael D. (1999). The Maya. Ancient peoples and places series (6th, fully revised and expanded ed.). London and New York: Thames & Hudson. ISBN 0-500-28066-5. OCLC 59432778.
- Gray, Richard (August 17, 2015). "Sacred Sinkhole Discovered 1,000-year-old-Mayan-Temple-Eventually-Destroy-Pyramid". Daily Mail (Science & Tech).
- Juárez-Rodríguez, O.; Argote-Espino, D.; Santos-Ramírez, M.; López-García, P. (2017). "Portable XRF analysis for the identification of raw materials of the Red Jaguar sculpture in Chichén Itzá, Mexico". Quaternary International.
- Justice, Adam (August 14, 2015). "Scientists discover sacred sinkhole cave under Chichen Itza pyramid". Ibtimes - Science.
- Milbrath, Susan (1999). Star Gods of the Maya: Astronomy in Art, Folklore, and Calendars. The Linda Schele series in Maya and pre-Columbian studies. Austin: University of Texas Press. ISBN 0-292-75225-3. OCLC 40848420.
- Šprajc, Ivan; Sánchez Nava, Pedro Francisco (2013). "Astronomía en la arquitectura de Chichén Itzá: una reevaluación". Estudios de Cultura Maya. XLI: 31–60.
- Tejero-Andrade, A.; Argote-Espino, D.; Cifuentes-Nava, G.; Hernández-Quintero, E.; Chávez, R.E.; García-Serrano, A. (2018). "'Illuminating' the interior of Kukulkan's Pyramid, Chichén Itzá, Mexico, by means of a non-conventional ERT geophysical survey". Journal of Archaeological Science. 90: 1–11.
- Willard, T.A. (1941). Kukulcan, the Bearded Conqueror : New Mayan Discoveries. Hollywood, CA: Murray and Gee. OCLC 3491500.
- Wren, L.; Kristan-Graham, C.; Nygard, T.; Spencer, K. R. (2018). Landscapes of the Itza : Archaeology and art history at Chichen Itza and neighboring sites. Gainesville: University Press of Florida.
