= Red Jaguar Throne =

Maya throne in the Temple of Kukulcan

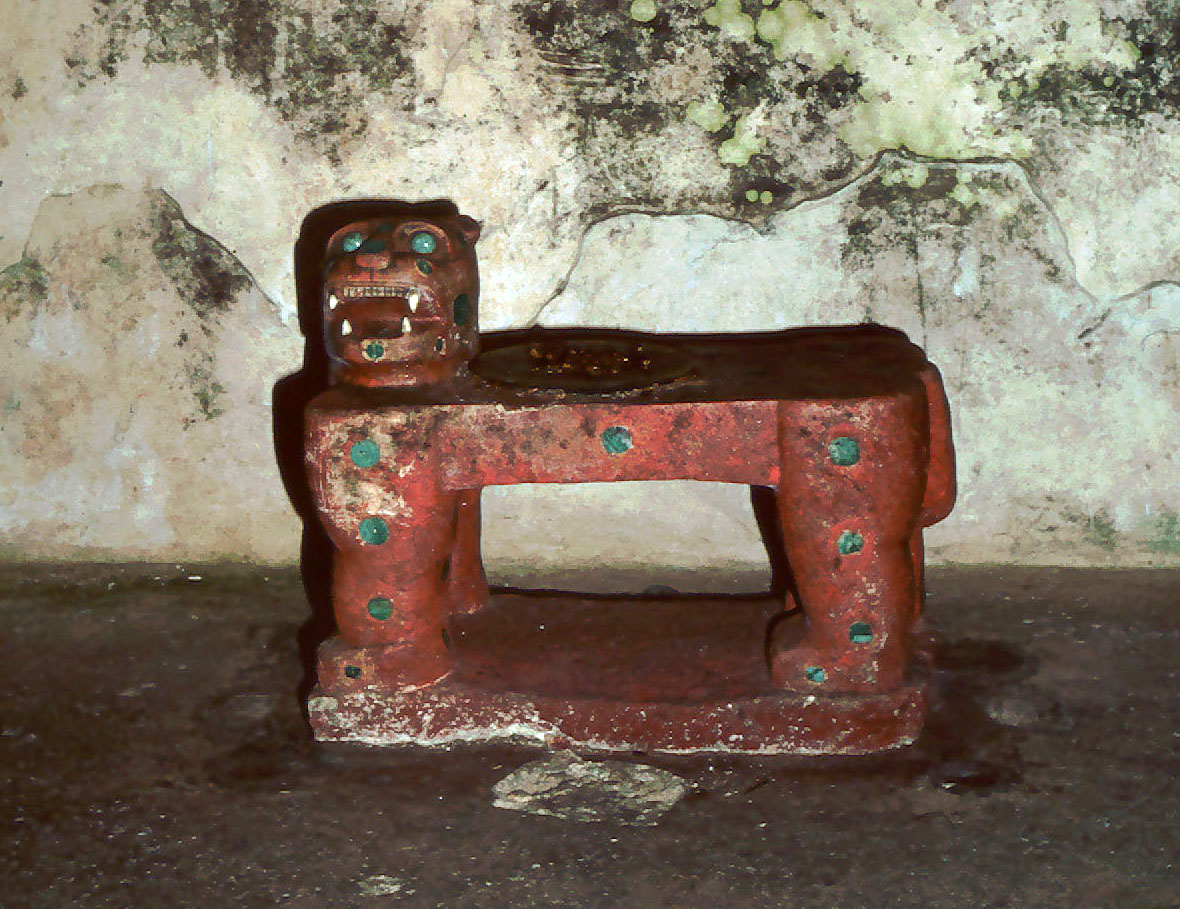
- The Red Jaguar Throne inside the Temple of Kukulcan at Chichen Itza
- Material: Limestone, jade
- Height: 69 cm (27 in)
- Width: 84 cm (33 in)
- Created: Circa 700 AD
- Discovered: 1936
- Present location: Temple of Kukulcan, Chichen Itza, Mexico
- Culture: Maya

The Red Jaguar Throne is a Maya throne located inside the substructure of the Temple of Kukulcan (or El Castillo) in the Maya city of Chichen Itza, Mexico. The throne is a red-painted limestone sculpture carved in the shape of a jaguar, whose eyes are made of two jade spheres and its mouth open as a symbol of power, its spots are made of jade discs, and its fangs are made of white shell. It was the royal seat of the rulers of Chichen Itza for a period in its history and represented the strength and sacred power of the jaguar, an important animal in Maya mythology linked to authority, the night, and the underworld, and whose spirit was embodied by those who acceded to the Red Jaguar Throne.

== History ==
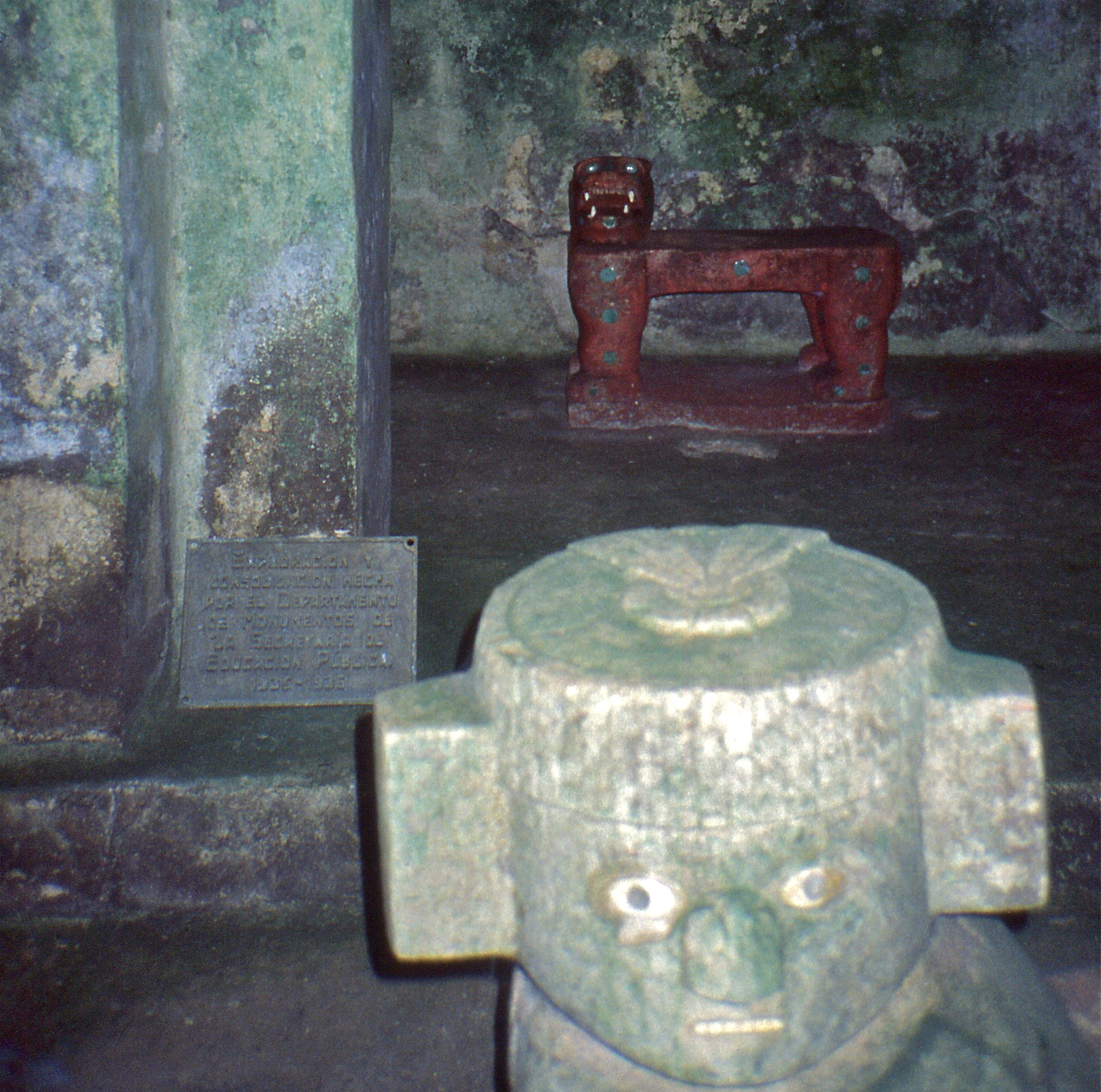
The Red Jaguar Throne behind the Chacmool sculpture inside the Temple of Kukulcan.

The Red Jaguar Throne was for a period the sacred seat of power of the rulers of the Maya city of Chichen Itza, located in the second chamber of the upper temple of a stepped pyramidal base over which the Temple of Kukulcan (or El Castillo), as it is known today, would later be built. This building, archaeologically identified as the substructure of the Temple of Kukulcan (or the substructure of El Castillo), was built in the terminal Classic period of Mayan civilization and was used to main religious and ceremonial structure of the city. It contains a two-chamber enclosure with the throne and a Chacmool sculpture. According to archaeological research, the Red Jaguar Throne was made around 700 AD during the Late Classic period of the Maya civilization. The throne was believed to be alive and served as a sacred connection between the rulers and the jaguar, an animal of great importance within Mayan mythology that was associated to power, the night, and the underworld, those who sat on it embodied the strength and spirit of the jaguar, considered as a living guardian of the city.

In ancient Mayan mythology, it was believed that temples and sacred sculptures were alive or contained the energy of a deity or mythological entity, so they needed a death ritual when it was considered that they had completed their life cycle. In the Postclassic period, before the construction of the Temple of Kukulcan on top of the substructure, a ritual death was given to the Red Jaguar Throne with the highest honors and ceremonies granted to royal figures of the time as it was considered a sacred incarnation of the jaguar and guardian of the city. During the ritual, a wooden disc with turquoise mosaics known as tezcacuitlapilli was placed on his back. This was a type of dorsal mirror of great importance used by different Mesoamerican cultures and which could have belonged to the ruler in turn. On top of this was placed a fire offering that burned the tezcacuitlapilli and when the Red Jaguar died symbolically, it was covered again with cinnabar, a material frequently used in Mesoamerica to cover the tombs and remains of the greatest rulers to display wealth. The throne was covered with a petate and sealed with large stone blocks, forming something similar to a sarcophagus as burial. Then the temple and the chambers were sealed and the Temple of Kukulcan was built on top of the Substructure, leaving the Red Jaguar Throne resting inside.

The throne was discovered in 1936 during the archaeological exploration of the second chamber of the substructure of the Temple of Kukulcan in Chichen Itza. At that time, it was still preservfter ted inside the large stone box in which it had been kept for centuries. Ahe stone blocks were removed, the Red Jaguar was freed from its burial, becoming one of the greatest treasures of Maya culture. Due to its cultural and historical value in Mexico, the Red Jaguar Throne was used as an unofficial mascot for the 1968 Summer Olympics. It could be visited in the archaeological zone of Chichen Itza until 2006 when the Mexican authorities and archaeological institutions restricted public access to the interior of the Temple of Kukulcan for its conservation.
