= Pisté, Yucatán =

Pisté
- Village
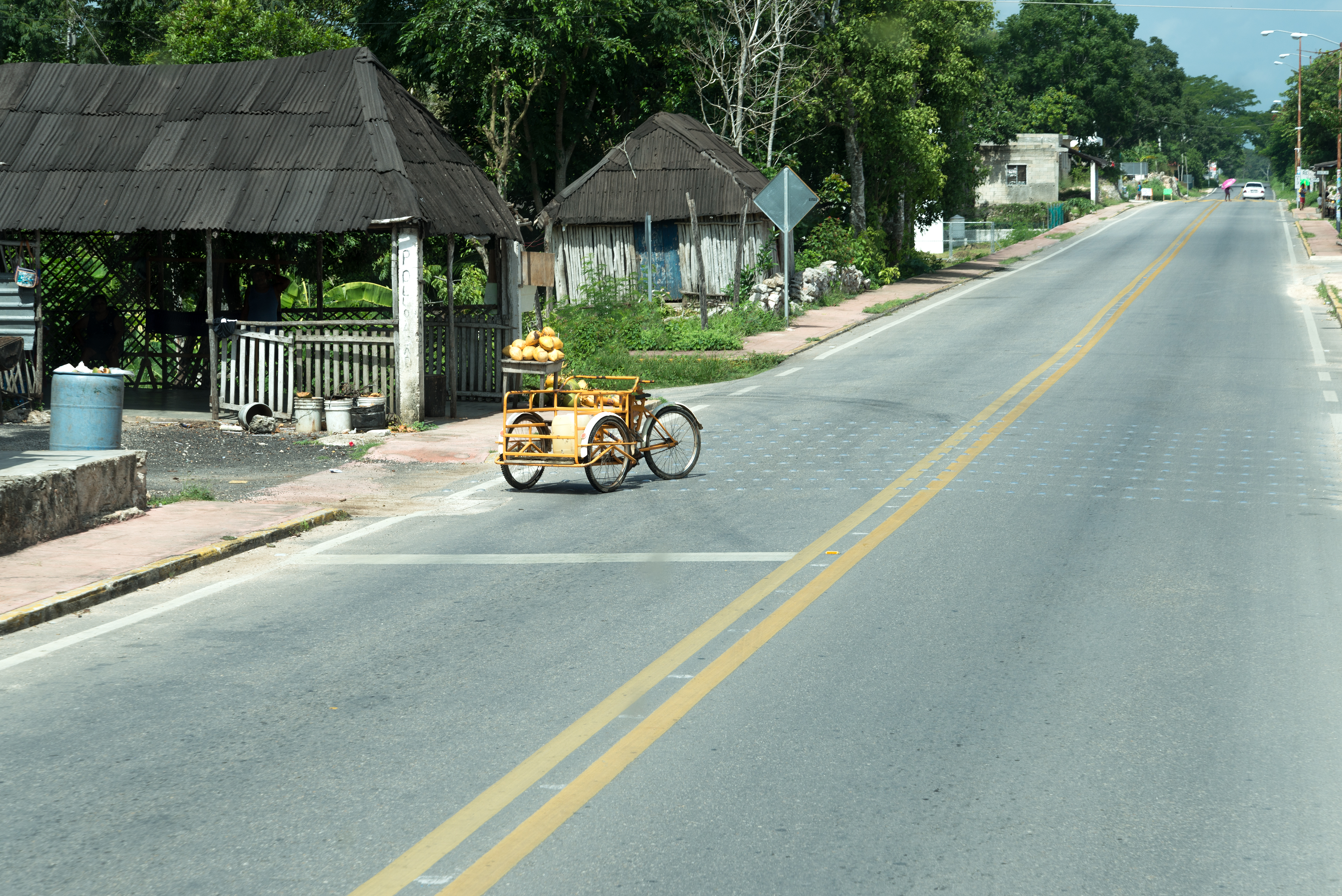

- Location in Yucatan Pisté (Mexico)
- Coordinates: 20°41′53″N 88°35′19″W
- Country: Mexico
- State: Yucatan
- Municipality: Tinum
- Elevation: 20 m (66 ft)

Population (2010)
  - Total: 5,528
- Time zone: UTC-6 (Central Standard Time)
  - Summer (DST): UTC-5 (Central Daylight Time)
- ZIP code: 97757
- Area code: 985
- INEGI Code: 310910006

Pisté is a village in Tinum Municipality in the center of Yucatán State, Mexico. It is best known for the Mayan archaeological site Chichen Itza and the cenote Ik Kil. Federal Highway 180 connects Pisté to Valladolid, about 40 kilometres (25 mi) away, and Mérida, the capital of Yucatán, about 111 kilometres (69 mi) away. There are a variety of hotels serving the tourist sites.
