= Tinum Municipality =

Municipality in the Mexican state of Yucatán

Tinum
- Municipality
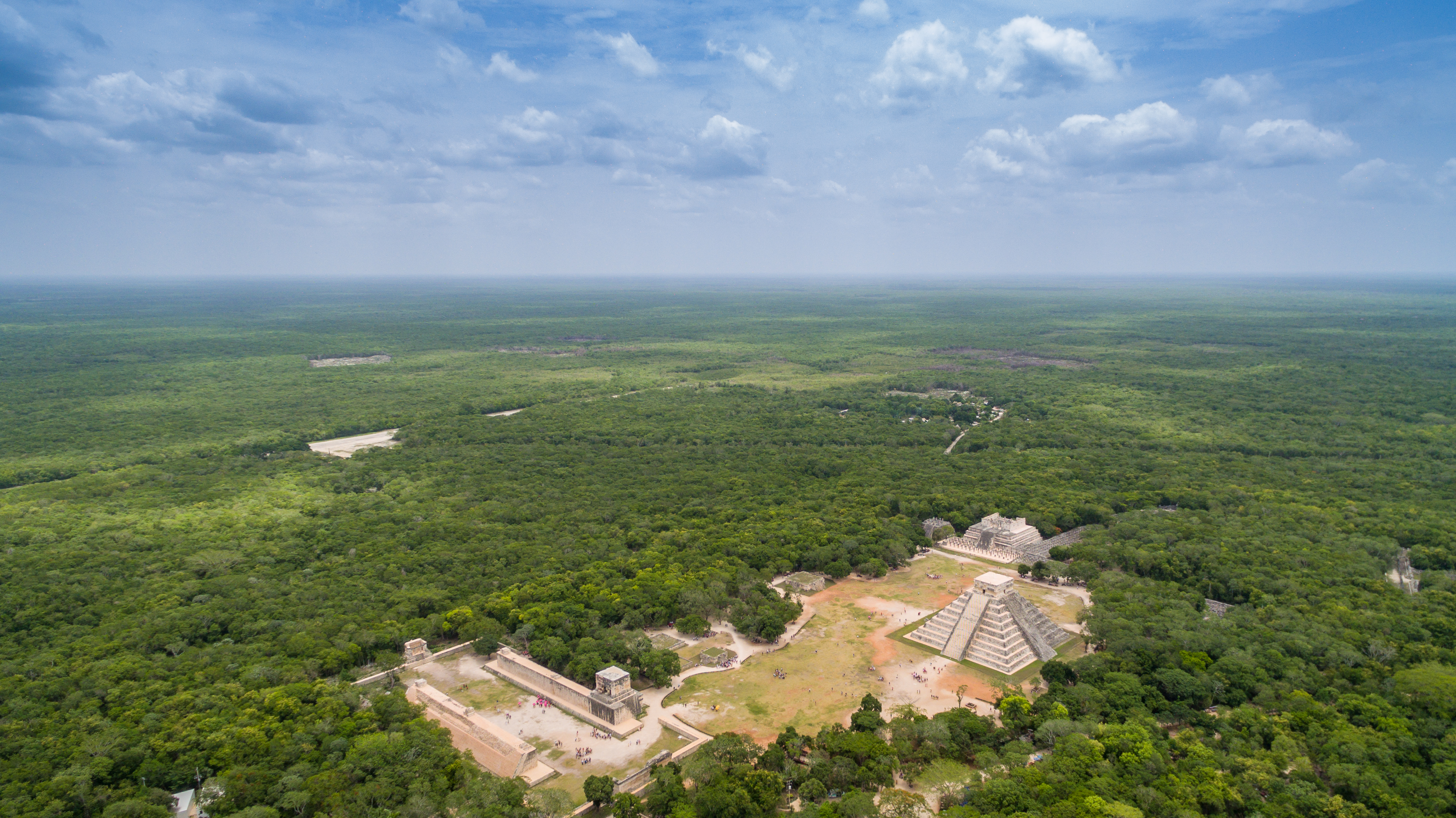

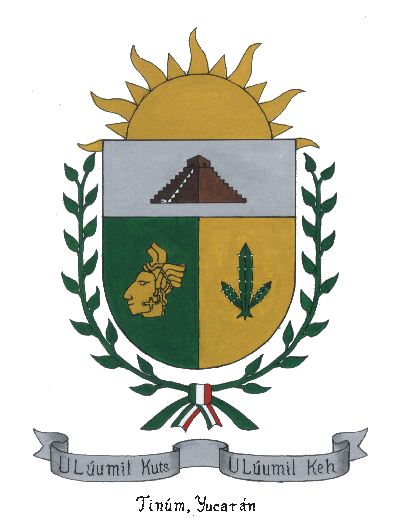
- Coat of arms

- Region 6 Oriente #091

- Location of the Municipality in Mexico
- Coordinates: 20°45′59″N 88°23′30″W
- Country: Mexico
- State: Yucatán
- Mexico Ind.: 1821
- Yucatán Est.: 1824

Government
  - Type: 2012–2015
  - Municipal President: Natalia Mis Mex

Area
  - Total: 393.44 km^{2} (151.91 sq mi)
- Elevation: 24 m (79 ft)

Population (2010)
  - Total: 11,421
  - Density: 29.029/km^{2} (75.184/sq mi)
  - Demonym: Umanense
- Time zone: UTC-6 (Central Standard Time)
- INEGI Code: 091
- Major Airport: Merida (Manuel Crescencio Rejón) International Airport
- IATA Code: MID
- ICAO Code: MMMD

Tinum Municipality (Yucatec Maya: "crippled numtzutzuy (Note: "cereus pentagonus: Numtzutzuy (Gaumer); reported also as "nuntzutzuy." Sp. Tuna silvestre. Common. Stems climbing, 3-5-angled, rarely 6-8-angled, the spines 4 cm. long or less; flowers 14-20 cm. long, white; fruit large, red. The fruit is edible. The spines are sometimes used as a substitute for pins".)") is a municipality in the Mexican state of Yucatán containing 393.44 km^{2} (151.91 sq mi) of land and is located roughly 140 kilometres (87 mi) east of the city of Mérida.

== History ==
There is no accurate data on when the town was founded, but it was a settlement before the conquest and was located in the chieftainship of Cupules. Within the municipality is Chichen Itza, a city built in the Post Classic Maya period, which reached its apex between the 11th and 12th centuries.

After colonization by the Spanish, the area became part of the encomienda system with various encomenderos, beginning with Juan García de Llanos in 1549 and passing to the crown in 1551. In 1607, it passed to Baltasar Pacheco Dorantes.

Yucatán declared its independence from the Spanish Crown in 1821. In 1825 the Mexican government assigned this community to the Valladolid Municipality. In 1918 Tinum was designated as an independent municipality.

== Governance ==
The municipal president is elected for a three-year term. The town council has seven councilpersons, who serve as Secretary and councilors of public works, police commissaries, education, ecology, public monuments and sports.

== Communities ==
The seat of the municipality is Tinum. The municipality has 37 populated places besides the seat, including Balantún, Chichén Itzá, Chichil, Dzulotok, Macuchén, Pisté, San Francisco, San Felipe, San Felipe Nuevo, San José, San Nicolás, Santa María, Tohopkú, and X-Calakoop. The significant populations are shown below:

Community	Population
Entire Municipality (2010)	11,421
Pisté	4467 in 2005
San Francisco	1444 in 2005
Tinum	1980 in 2005
Tohopkú	470 in 2005
X-Calakoop	1239 in 2005

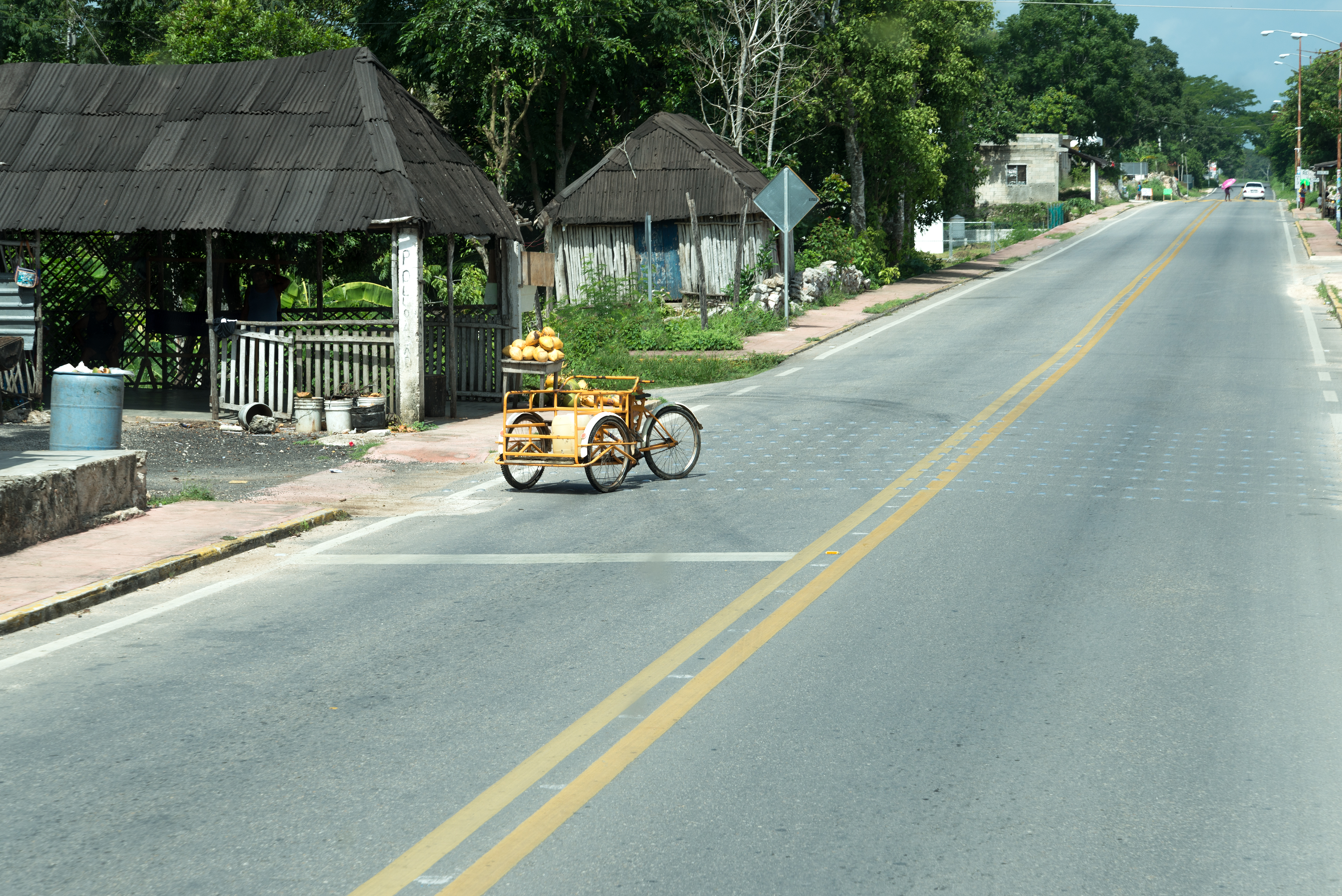
Pisté

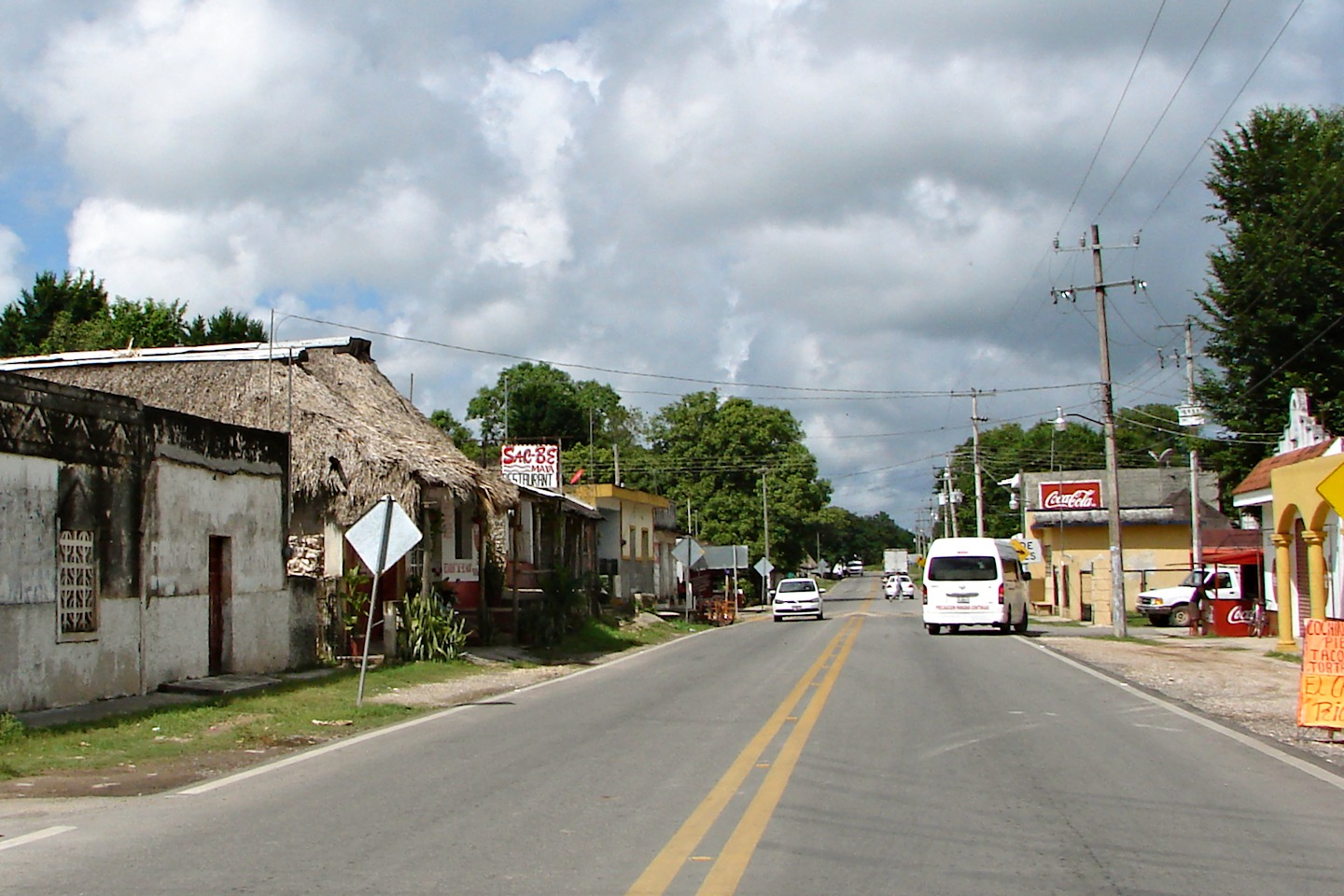
X-Calacoop

== Local festivals ==
Every year on 12 June, the town celebrates the feast of Saint Anthony of Padua, its patron saint.

== Tourist attractions ==
- Church of Saint Anthony of Padua, built during the colonial era
- Church of Conception, built during the colonial era
- archeological sites at Bacancú, Canahum, Chichen Itza, Dzibiac, Halacal, Joya de Erik Thompson, Pisté, San Francisco Semé, San Juan Holtún, Tikincab, La Venta and Xnabá.
- Sacred Cenote
- Hacienda Chichén
