= Bejucal (Mesoamerican site) =

Maya archeological site in Guatemala

Coordinates: 17.42°N 89.67°W

Bejucal is a Maya archaeological site in the Petén Department of Guatemala. It is located 7 kilometres (4.3 mi) northeast of El Zotz and was subservient to that city. The site is thought to date to the second half of the 4th century AD, in the Early Classic period.

== Location ==
The site is located within the San Miguel La Palotada biotope in the municipality of San José in the department of Petén in northern Guatemala. The biotope is a part of the Maya Biosphere Reserve that is bordered on the east by the Tikal National Park and surrounded on all other sides by designated multiple-use zones of the Reserve. Bejucal is situated 20 kilometres (12 mi) west of the ruins of Tikal.

== History ==
Bejucal was the original capital of the royal dynasty that later ruled El Zotz, apparently transferring their capital to that city.

The Teotihuacan-linked general Siyaj K'ak' ("Fire is Born") conquered Bejucal in the 4th century, together with many other sites in Petén, including the great city of Tikal. A text at the site mentions Siyaj K'ak' as overlord of Bejucal in AD 381. Stela 1 from Bejucal also indicates that Siyaj K'ak' was overlord of nearby El Zotz. From around this time the kings of Bejucal began to refer to themselves as vassals of Tikal, their giant neighbour, using the y ajaw phrase meaning subordinate lord.

Inscriptions at Bejucal all fit within a very short 40-year span in the second half of the 4th century, ending about AD 396. The abrupt cessation of inscriptions at Bejucal is possibly the result of the expansion of the Tikal polity.

In the late 1970s Ian Graham visited Bejucal and recorded two stelae and a sculpted altar.
