= El Zotz =

Mesoamerican archaeological site in Guatemala

Coordinates: 17°17′N 89°48′W

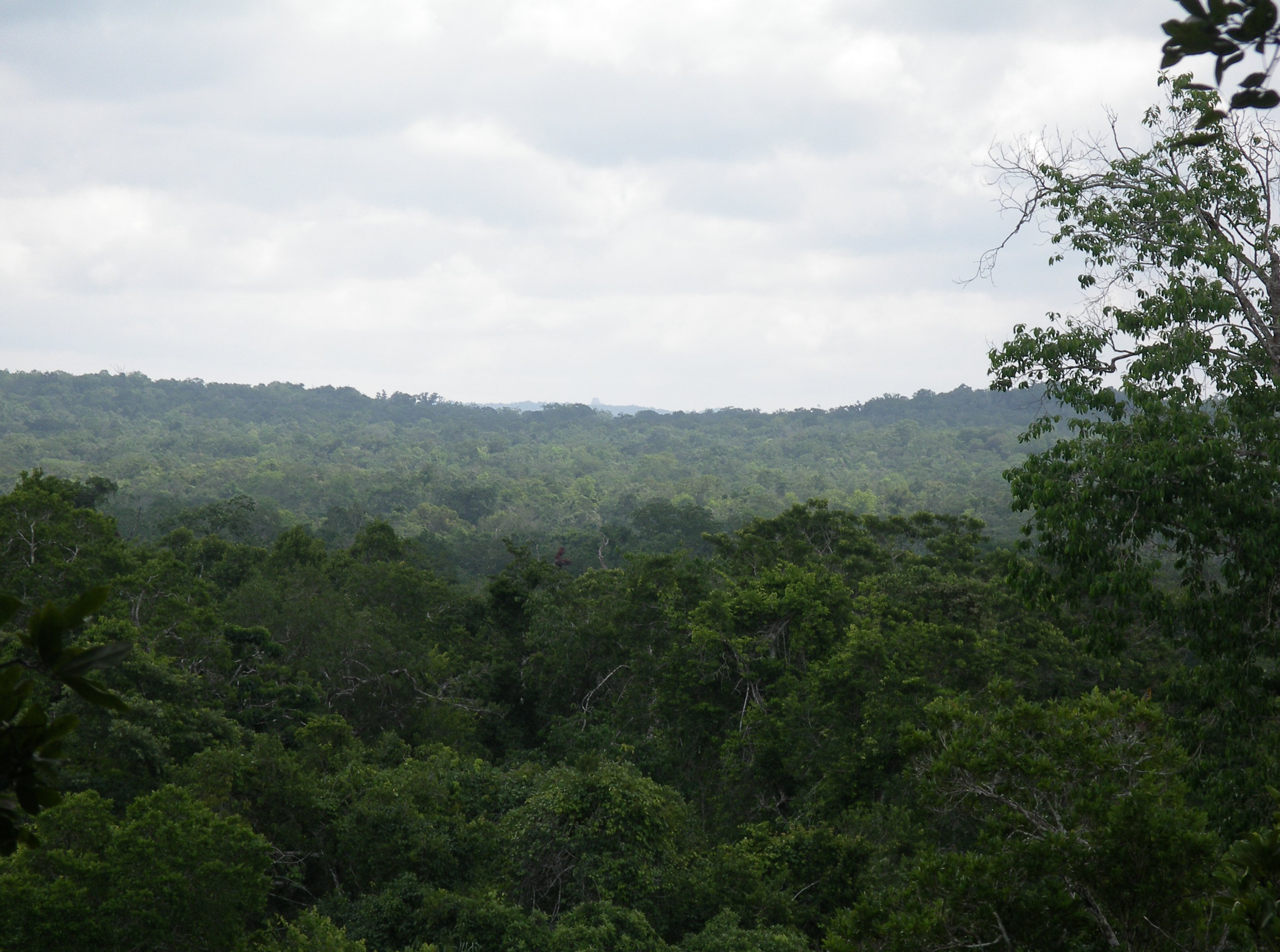
Tikal Temple IV on the horizon 20 kilometres (12 mi) away from El Zotz

Location of El Zotz in Guatemala

El Zotz (Spanish pronunciation: [el sots]) is a Mesoamerican archaeological site of the pre-Columbian Maya civilization, located in the Petén Basin region around 20 kilometres (12 mi) west of the major center of Tikal and approximately 26 kilometres (16 mi) west of Uaxactun. It is so called because of the large number of bats living in caves in the nearby cliffs (the original Mayan name was Pa'Chan). The site is located within the San Miguel la Palotada National Park bordering the Tikal National Park in the present-day department of Petén, Guatemala. It is a large Classic Period site and contains many unexcavated mounds and ruins.

El Zotz shared its Emblem Glyph with the powerful city of Yaxchilan in Chiapas, Mexico, and it is likely that the Yaxchilan royal dynasty had its origin in El Zotz.

The tallest temple structure is approximately 45 m (148 ft) high and is known as "El Diablo" (the devil), allegedly because the sides of the temple are dangerously steep. Conservation work has been carried out here by the University of San Carlos of Guatemala, including the construction of a rudimentary campsite for tourists. The area has caves and swamps and is a protected biotope. It is known for the hundreds of thousands of bats that fly out from under the cliffs at sunset.

== Name ==
The name El Zotz may have been chosen by Marco Antonio Bailey when he visited the site in 1977, with the name appearing on the map he produced. The site had previously been named Dos Aguadas (Two Springs) and Bailey may have changed the name to distinguish the site from other places in the region bearing the same name. Zotz and its variations mean bat in a variety of Mayan languages, for example sotz' in Kʼicheʼ Maya, zodz in Yucatec Maya and suts' in Ch'ol Maya. The new name derives from the fact that the El Diablo complex possesses a cave that is the habitat of an enormous quantity of the animals.

== Location and environment ==
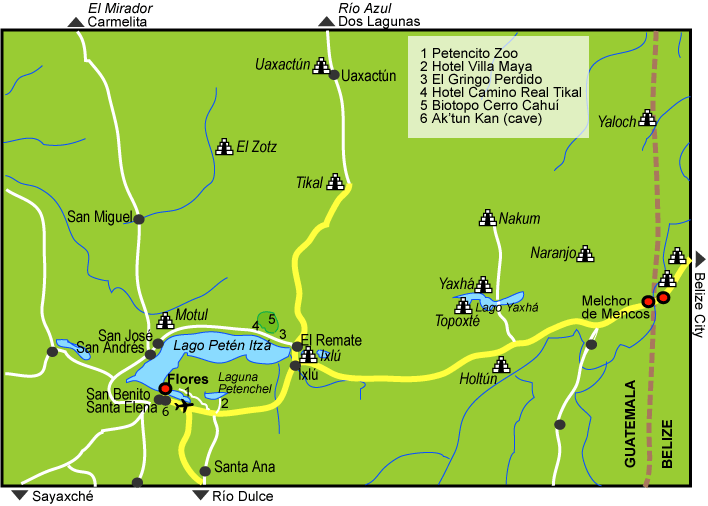
Map of Lake Petén Itzá, showing the location of El Zotz to the north.

The site is located within the municipality of San José in the department of Petén. El Zotz falls within the San Miguel La Palotada biotope, a part of the Maya Biosphere Reserve that is bordered on the east by the Tikal National Park and surrounded on all other sides by designated multiple-use zones of the Reserve.

The site is 7 kilometres (4.3 mi) southwest of Bejucal, another Maya site that was subsidiary to El Zotz.

El Zotz is a medium-sized site covering an area of perhaps 0.75 by 0.75 kilometres (0.47 by 0.47 mi) that includes a variety of large and small architectural remains in a style typical of the Early Classic. The site is crossed by low ridges that run from southwest to northeast. The maximum height of the ridges is approximately 400 metres (1,300 ft) above mean sea level, with the troughs between them having an elevation of about 150 metres (490 ft). The local bedrock is limestone. The site overlooks a valley occupied by seasonal swampland.

The site is covered with tropical moist forest and includes areas of seasonal inundated forest. The average annual temperature is 27 °C (81 °F) with the actual temperature varying between 20 °C (68 °F) and 32 °C (90 °F). Average annual rainfall varies between 1,200 and 1,400 millimetres (47 and 55 in) with a dry season lasting from January to April.

Local wildlife includes the following species, some of which are highly endangered: jaguar (Panthera onca), puma (Felis concolor), ocelot (Leopardus wiedii), Baird's tapir (Tapirus bairdii), red brocket deer (Mazama americana), howler monkey (Alouatta pigra), red snook (Petenia splendida), Morelet's Crocodile (Crocodylus moreletii) and the ocellated turkey (Agriocharis ocellata).

== History ==
Although Preclassic ceramic fragments are abundant at El Zotz, the site appears to have undergone significant expansion during the 6th century AD, in the Early Classic, the location of the site together with its architectural style suggest that this may have been due to the influence of the important city of Tikal. The apogee of El Zotz appears to have been brief, spanning about one hundred years during the later Early Classic and the early part of the Late Classic, experiencing an intense burst of construction activity including the building of palaces and pyramids, followed by a rapid decline.

The ruling dynasty of El Zotz appears to have originated at Bejucal and to later have relocated its capital to El Zotz. The reading of hieroglyphic texts associated with the site suggest that El Zotz was founded by enemies of Tikal in order to exploit a period of weakness of the latter city. The city possessed the same Emblem Glyph as Yaxchilan on the Mexican side of the Usumacinta River and it is supposed that the royal dynasty of that city had its origin in El Zotz.

A stela from Bejucal indicates that the Teotihuacan-linked general Siyaj K'ak' ("Fire is Born") was the overlord (yajaw) of the king of El Zotz. This general was implicated in a major Teotihuacan-backed military intervention in the central Petén during the 4th century AD. A bowl found in Bagaces in Costa Rica bears a hieroglyphic text indicating that it was a gift from the king of El Zotz to the king of El Perú, a city 56 kilometres (35 mi) west of El Zotz. This, in combination with other texts, indicates that El Zotz was subordinate to El Perú. El Perú was in turn a vassal of the great city of Calakmul, the sworn enemy of Tikal, and a jade plaque from a royal tomb at Calakmul refers to an event at El Zotz.

El Zotz appears to have passed through a period of renewed prosperity during the Late Classic and the city would have had close interactions with its near neighbours, such as Tikal, Uaxactun, Motul de San José and El Tintal. El Zotz appears to have been particularly densely inhabited during the Terminal Classic. Although El Zotz appears to have received strong influences from Tikal, it appears to have taken its place in the larger political rivalry between Tikal and Calakmul and to have aligned itself with Tikal's great enemy in order to gain local advantage. When Tikal recovered from its misfortunes it appears that El Zotz was unable to survive its attentions.

Hostile relations between El Zotz and its huge neighbour Tikal are evidenced on the ground by an earthwork of unknown date that served to mark the territorial division between the two polities. In the 8th century AD, according to a text at Tikal, El Zotz and Naranjo were jointly engaged in battle against Tikal. This battle took place on 4 February 744. The last known hieroglyphic inscription to refer to El Zotz describes the city as being the target of an attack by Tikal.

== Modern history ==
The earliest visits to the site were carried out in response to reports of archaeological looting. Archaeologist Marco Antonio Bailey visited the site in 1977 on behalf of the recently founded Departamento de Monumentos Prehispánicos (DEMOPRE – Department of Prehispanic Monuments) of the Instituto de Antropología e Historia (Institute of Anthropology and History), this was the first official visit to the site on behalf of the Guatemalan government. Bailey did not produce any written report but he did map the site. George F. Andrews briefly visited the site in 1978, with his written report appearing in the magazine Mexicon in 1986. This was the first mention of the site in print. The Proyecto Nacional Tikal briefly investigated the site in May 1983, although its report was not published until 20 years later, in 2006.

The Departamento de Monumentos Prehispánicos remapped the site in 1995, with the new map being published in 2001. The Tikal Project's Programa de Arqueología Regional (Regional Archaeology Programme) sunk some test pits at the site in 2000 but the results had still not been published as of 2006. A further survey was undertaken during two weeks of January 2006 by the Departamento de Monumentos Prehispanicos in conjunction with Archaeologist Stephen D. Houston and Brown University.

The Denver Art Museum has returned a carved wooden lintel stolen from the site, one of the few such artifacts in existence. It dates to 550–650 AD and was taken from Temple I, the northern pyramid in the main plaza, in the 1960s. It shows a son of a ruler from Tikal. It is now in National Archeology Museum in Guatemala City.

A three-year investigation was begun at El Zotz in May 2008. Later studies in the late-2010s using LIDAR, have revealed a far larger site than previously envisaged. The studies revealed houses, palaces, elevated highways, and defensive fortifications. Ithaca College archaeologist, Thomas Garrison, says he believes the scale and population density has been "grossly underestimated and could in fact be three or four times greater than previously thought".

According to Global Heritage Fund and World Monuments Fund, El Zotz is endangered by insufficient management, looting, deforestation, and natural disaster, as well as general threats (agriculture, poaching, forest-fires, and illegal extraction) to the Maya Biosphere.

== Site description ==
El Zotz has at least two principal ceremonial centres. The main ceremonial centre lies within the site core while the second of these is in an area known as El Diablo. The architecture at the site is massive and the stonework of excellent quality, which has undoubtedly helped in the preservation of the structures at the site. The structures were packed with rubble and mortar together with layers of clay, this last element likely brought from the lowland troughs near the site. The superstructures of the buildings at the site were built with large well-finished limestone blocks sealed with mortar, these were then covered with stucco and painted in a variety of colours, some traces of pigment still remain. Rooms within the superstructures were narrow and supported vaulted ceilings.

Four chultunob were found cut into the limestone bedrock of the plazas at the site. These are artificial subterranean chambers that were probably used to store water.

The site core is set out around a Central Plaza bordered by structures on the north and west sides. The Acropolis lies to the north of the Central Plaza with the East Plaza lying directly east of the Acropolis. The Plaza of the Five Temples lies to the west of the Central Plaza and the South Plaza lies to the south of both. The site core lies upon flatter terrain at the site, close to the two springs. The Proyecto Nacional Tikal carried out rescue works in the site core in 1983.

The site core of El Zotz contains 49 buildings divided between four main groups.

The spatial configuration of the site core, its peripheral ceremonial nodes, and associated ecological protection zones within the San Miguel La Palotada Biotope are structured as follows:

- Site Core (49 Buildings across 4 Main Groups):
  - Group 1 (East Group): Connected via the East Causeway (Sacbe); contains Temple M7-1 (a 22.5 m tall triadic temple pyramid with a looted sapodilla wood lintel).
  - Group 2 (Central Group): Includes the primary Acropolis (Structures L7-1 to L7-10), Temple 1 (a 25 m tall funerary pyramid), a symbolic ballcourt, and Stela 1.
  - Group 3 (Five Temples Group): Flanked by northern and southern pyramids; includes Structure L7-18 and Structure L8-13 (containing a looted royal bedrock tomb).
  - Group 4 (South Group): Features an elevated acropolis platform with more than 10 structures, connected via the South Causeway.
- Peripheral Ceremonial Nodes and Ecological Features:
  - El Diablo Complex: Located 1 km west on a defensive outcrop; features a terraced acropolis, the Temple of the Night Sun, and the Early Classic royal tomb of King Chak.
  - Bat Cliff Caves: Subterranean roosting caves located beneath the El Diablo cliffs, serving as a seasonal habitat for massive bat colonies.
  - Hydrological Features: Lowland seasonal swamplands and artificial subterranean chambers (chultunob) used for water storage.
- Protected Biotope Ecosystem and Fauna:
  - Flora: Tropical moist forest dominated by sapodilla trees (Manilkara zapota) and dense canopy vegetation.
  - Endangered Fauna: Protected habitat for the jaguar (Panthera onca), Baird's tapir (Tapirus bairdii), ocelot, puma, and the ocellated turkey.

== East Group (Group 1) ==
The East Group or Group 1 has various structures laid out around a wide plaza, including two mortuary pyramids on the north side.

The East Causeway is a sacbe that begins near Temple 1 in the Central Group and runs eastwards to the East Group.

Structure M7-1 is a 22.5-metre (74 ft) high temple pyramid with a base measuring 36 by 41 metres (118 by 135 ft). The temple shrine is fashioned from well-finished stones and is of a similar style to that of Tikal Temple I. The pyramid has two smaller mounds attached to it at the base, forming a triadic temple group. Both of the smaller mounds have been damaged by looters' trenches. A wooden lintel was illegally removed from the temple in the late 1960s and sold to the Denver Art Museum in the United States, provoking the first official visits and explorations of the site. The looted lintel was returned to Guatemala in 1998. The lintel was carved from five planks of sapodilla wood, forming a panel 180 centimetres (71 in) long and 74 centimetres (29 in) wide. The lintel is incomplete but depicts a standing human figure holding a ceremonial staff. The figure is surrounded by hieroglyphic writing on both sides and above it. The style of dress of the figure has been used to date the lintel to the late 6th century AD.

Structure M7-2 is located across the plaza from Structure M7-1. Its base measures {convert|21|by|33|m|ft)) and it is 12 metres (39 ft) high. The pyramid was probably accessed from the south, plaza, side. No clear evidence remains of any superstructure and the east side of the temple is damaged by two looters' trenches.

=== Central Group (Group 2) ===
The Central Plaza is bordered on the north by the acropolis, on the south by the ballcourt and on the west by a variety of low platforms and pyramids. Six stelae and an altar were placed in the Central Plaza, the stelae are mostly plain monuments arranged in two north-south rows, the westernmost containing four monuments and the parallel eastern row containing only two.

The Acropolis is an elite residence, probably a palace, laid out around three patios and encompassing Structures L7-1 through to L7-10 and including some large buildings among them. Eighteen looters' pits have been counted within the Acropolis.

- Structure L7-2 was damaged by a looters' trench. Archaeological investigations of the trench uncovered a quantity of Early Classic ceramics.
- Structure L7-6 has two wide access stairways, on the north and south sides.
- Structure L7-7 divides two of the patios. It was probably built later than the rest of the palace, splitting one larger courtyard into two.

Stela 1 is a carved limestone monument immediately south of Temple 1, it is the northernmost of the two stelae in the eastern row of monuments in the Central Plaza. It is the only sculpted stela currently known from the site and is carved on all four sides. The front of the monument has a human figure facing to the left, the back of the stela has a hieroglyphic panel consisting of 39 glyphic blocks. Ceramic fragments dating to the Late Classic were found near the stela, they have been interpreted as the result of ritual activity.

Temple 1 (or Structure L7-11) is a large pyramid with a corbel-vaulted superstructure situated on the northeast side of the Central Plaza. It is the principal structure at the site and has been heavily looted. The structure is a 25-metre (82 ft) high funerary temple measuring 40 by 40 metres (130 by 130 ft) at the base. In 1989 the Proyecto Nacional Tikal undertook rescue works at the temple, installing replacement lintels, sealing some of the chambers and closing the more dangerous looters' tunnels.

The Ballcourt is located on the south side of the Central Plaza. Considering the massive architecture at El Zotz, the ballcourt is unusually small and appears to have been more symbolic than practical.

=== Five Temples Group (Group 3) ===
The Plaza of the Five Temples is a wide plaza flanked on the north and south sides by two pyramids of similar height, while a long triadic temple complex occupies the east side of the plaza. The name of the plaza derives from the temples that line the plaza and the complex resembles the Plaza of the Seven Temples at Tikal and is also similar to architecture at Yaxha. Two plain stelae occupy the centre of the plaza, three more are placed in front of the temples on the east side of the plaza, together with an altar.

Structure L7-18 is a small pyramid on the west side of the Central Plaza. It has a base measuring 13 by 13 metres (43 by 43 ft) and with a height of 7 metres (23 ft). It has been damaged by two looters' pits, one of which was sunk into the summit resulting in serious structural damage and exposing a vaulted chamber with an intact doorjamb on its north side. The corbel vault and parts of the walls still retain their original stucco covering, the remains of which have revealed that the chamber was originally painted red, possibly together with other colours. Structure L7-18 has been dated to the Early Classic based on its architectural style. A looted tomb was found under the temple, it was roughly rectangular in shape with a curved roof, similar to tombs at the site of Río Azul.

Structure L8-13 is the north pyramid on the Plaza of the Five Temples. The pyramid stands 13 metres (43 ft) high and measures 22 by 26 metres (72 by 85 ft) at the base. It still has traces of a wooden lintel supported on thick door jambs. One of the jambs is marked with prehispanic graffiti. The pyramid once contained a royal tomb but it has been completely looted. The tomb was carved directly from the limestone bedrock under the pyramid, it is thought to have been the source of various fine quality ceramic vessels painted with images of wayob (spirit companions).

The South Causeway begins at the southeastern extreme of the Plaza of the Five Temples and runs south to the South Group.

=== South Group (Group 4) ===
The South Group consists of a large acropolis-type complex laid out around an internal patio. The group consists of ten or more structures built on a raised platform and covered by dense vegetation.

A further complex was identified by Bailey when he mapped the site. It consisted of a rectangular platform measuring 56 by 22 metres (184 by 72 ft) located to the southeast of the site core. The platform supports a tall pyramid in its centre. Although appearing on Bailey's plan, in 2006 the complex had not yet been investigated on the ground.

=== El Diablo ===
El Diablo is located about 1 kilometre (0.62 mi) west of the site core, it is the smaller of the two known main ceremonial centres at El Zotz. The name El Diablo means "the Devil" in Spanish. It is situated in a defensive position on the highest outcrop at El Zotz and is visible from Temple IV at Tikal. The El Diablo complex contains the cave containing the large quantity of bats that gave rise to the name of the site. The El Diablo complex is believed to date to the Late Classic.

The El Diablo hill was artificially reshaped with the addition of terraces, upon which an acropolis was built that consisted of large platforms laid out around at least two plazas. Looters' tunnels have exposed decorated substructures within the El Diablo acropolis, which have been tentatively dated to the Early Classic. The main plaza of El Diablo is small when compared to the plazas of the site core and the architecture is less impressive.

The discovery of a royal tomb in the El Diablo complex was announced in July 2010. The tomb is believed to contain the remains of a king named Chak who ruled in the late 4th century AD. The ruler was aged in his fifties or sixties at the time of his death and was interred with the remains of six sacrificed children aged between 1 and 5 years old.
