= Siyaj Kʼakʼ =

Mayan political figure of the Classic Period (250–800)

Siyaj Kʼakʼ (alternative spelling: Siyah Kʼakʼ), also known as Fire is Born (formerly nicknamed "Smoking Frog"), was a prominent political figure mentioned in the glyphs of Classic Period (250–800 CE) Maya civilization monuments, principally Tikal (which he conquered in January 378), as well as Uaxactun and the city of Copan. Epigraphers originally identified him by the nickname "Smoking Frog", a description of his name glyph, but later deciphered it as Siyaj Kʼakʼ, meaning "Fire is born". He is believed by some to have been the general of the Teotihuacano ruler Spearthrower Owl.

== Overview ==
Originally from Teotihuacan or very closely allied with that city, Siyaj Kʼakʼ was a warlord in the Maya heartland of the Petén (modern Guatemala) during the fourth century. In 378 and 379, he oversaw the replacing of the kings of important Maya states, such as Tikal, Uaxactun, and Copan with new rulers who claimed descent from Spearthrower Owl, possibly the ruler of Teotihuacan. As Fire is Born, he caused himself to be portrayed wearing Teotihuacano battle dress. It is during his lifetime that the public architecture of the Central Mexican capital began to be emulated in the Maya region; particularly the talud-tablero style so characteristic of the Mexican highlands, and so atypical of Maya building styles.

Siyaj Kʼakʼ remained a power in the region until his death early in the fifth century, acting as overlord to such kings as Yax Nuun Ayiin I (aka "Curl Nose") of Tikal. The appearance of Siyah Kʼakʼ marks the beginning of a strong cultural influx from the Valley of Mexico, although whether this was accomplished via peaceful interaction or military invasion is still being very actively debated.

== See also ==
- Bejucal (Mesoamerican site)
- El Zotz
- El Perú (Maya site)#Stela 15
- Tikal#Stela 31
- Uaxactun#Conquest of Uaxactun by Siyaj K.27ak.27
