= Tikal =

Ruin of ancient Maya city in Guatemala

- Yax Mutal
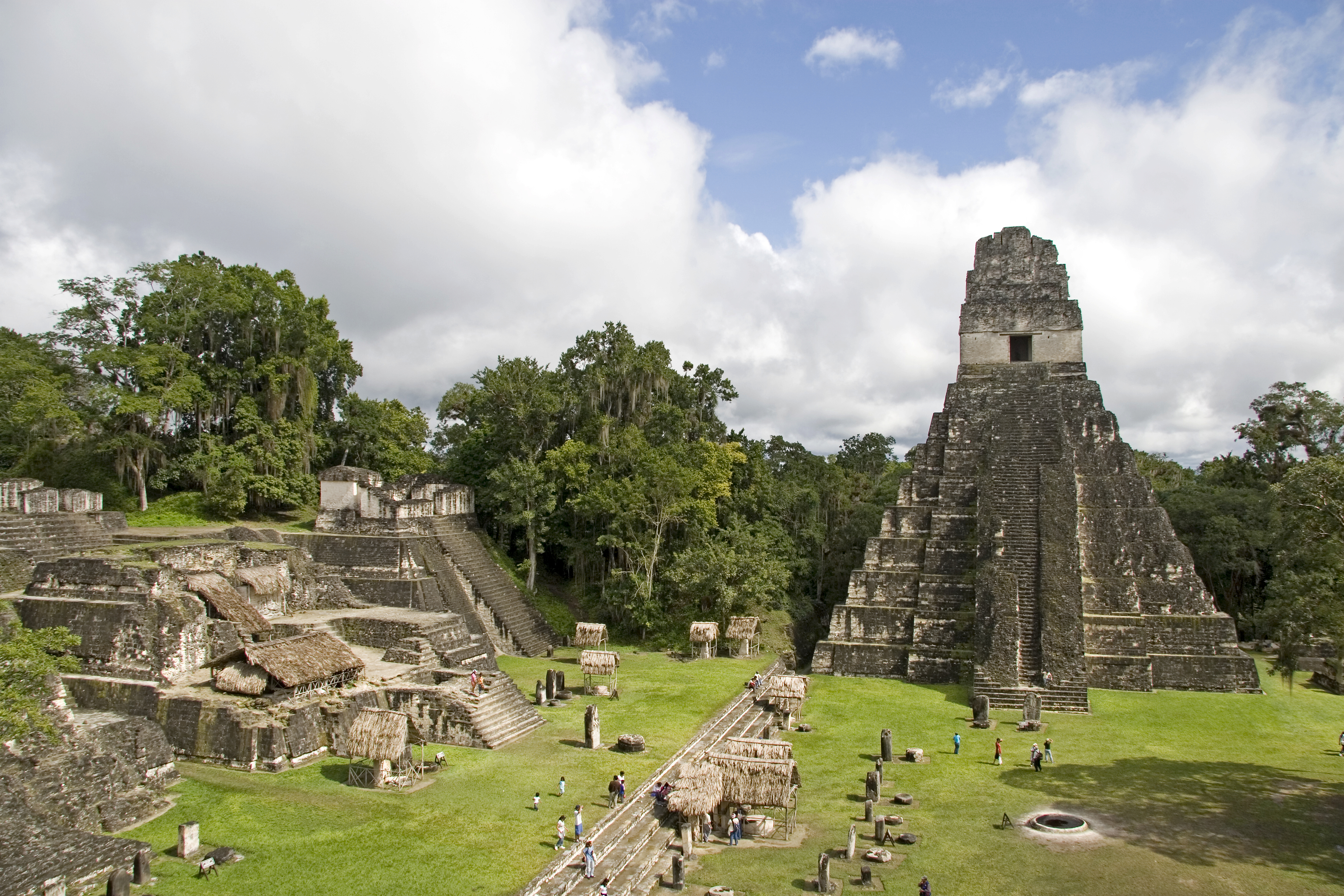
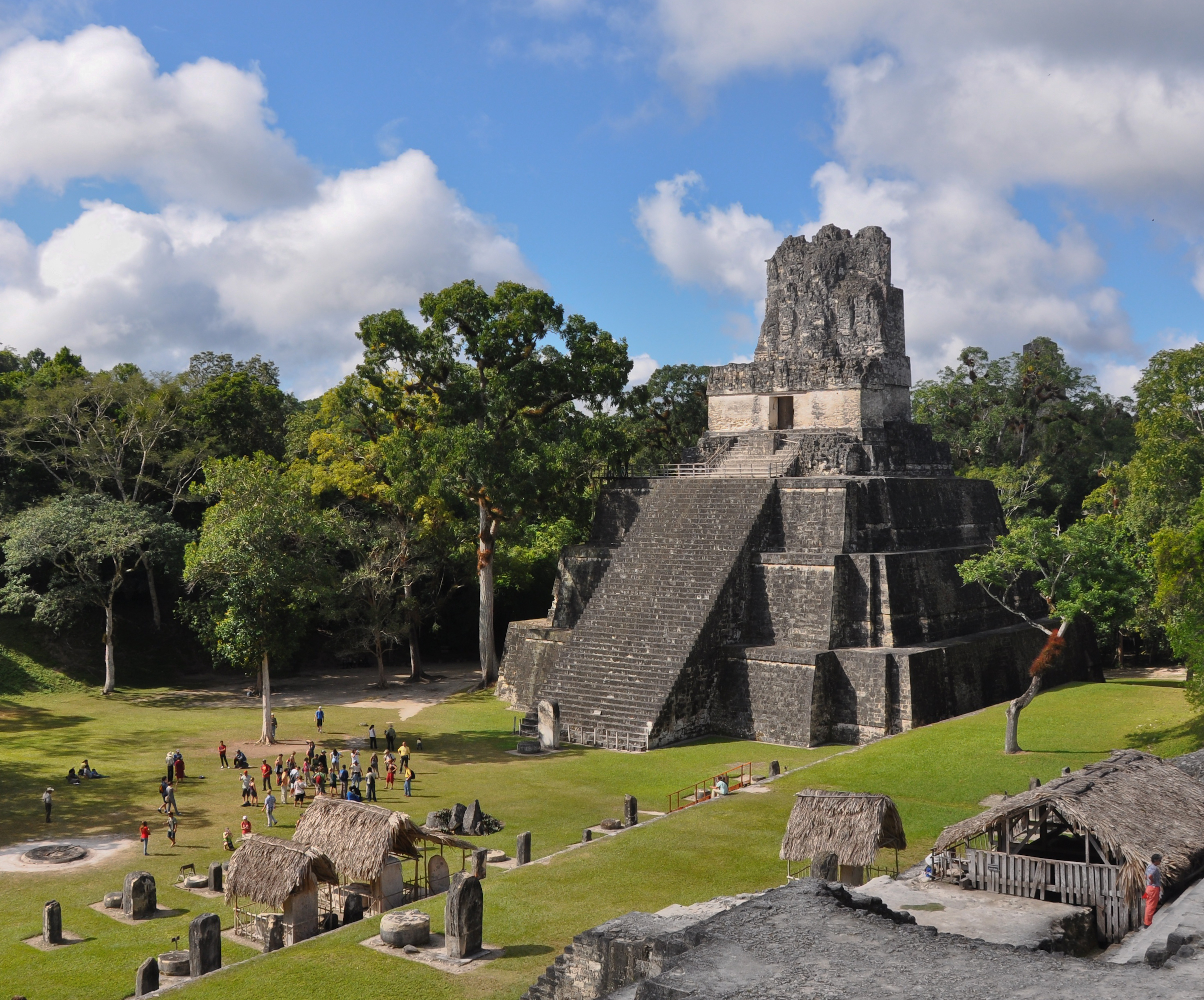
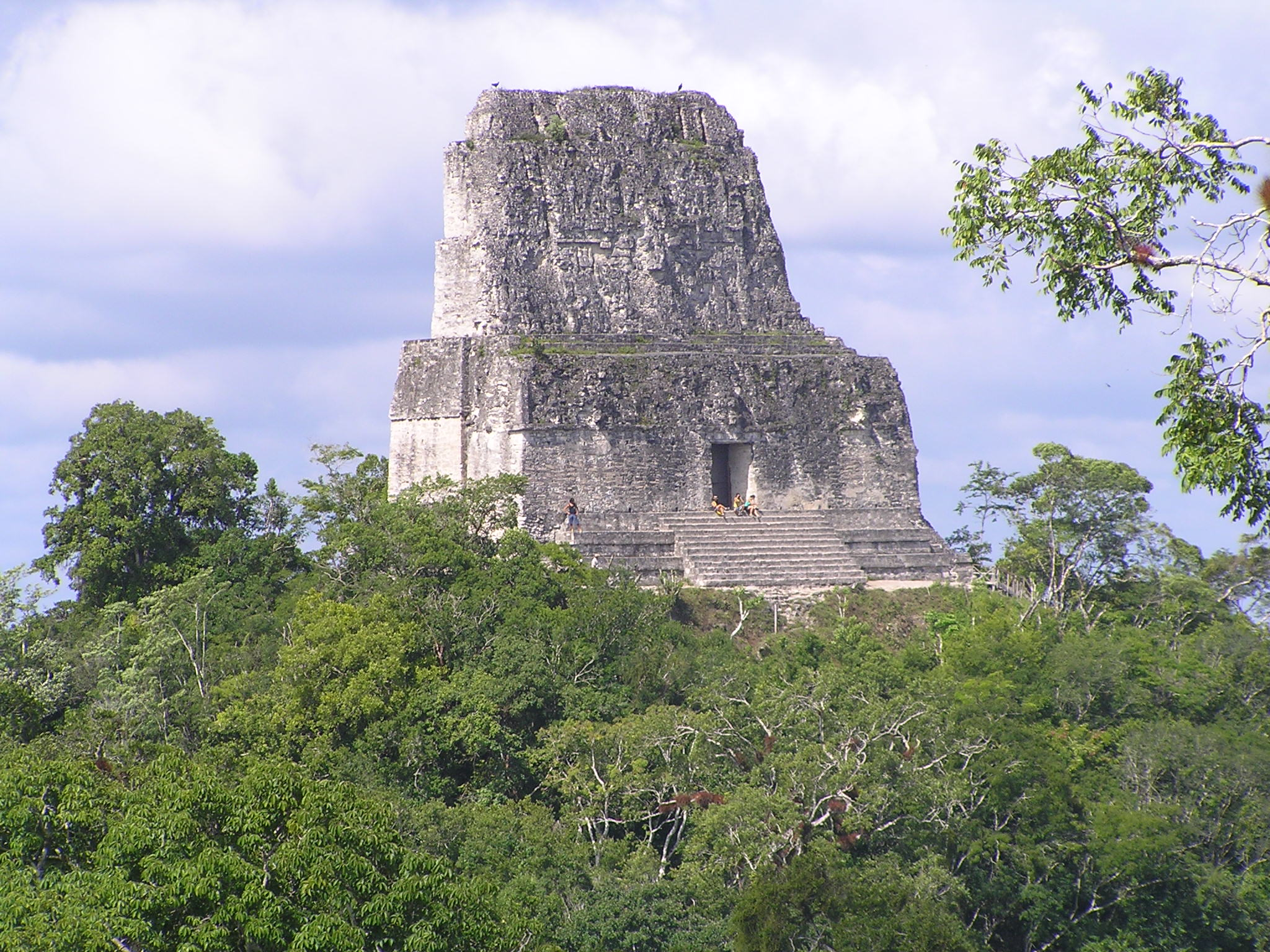
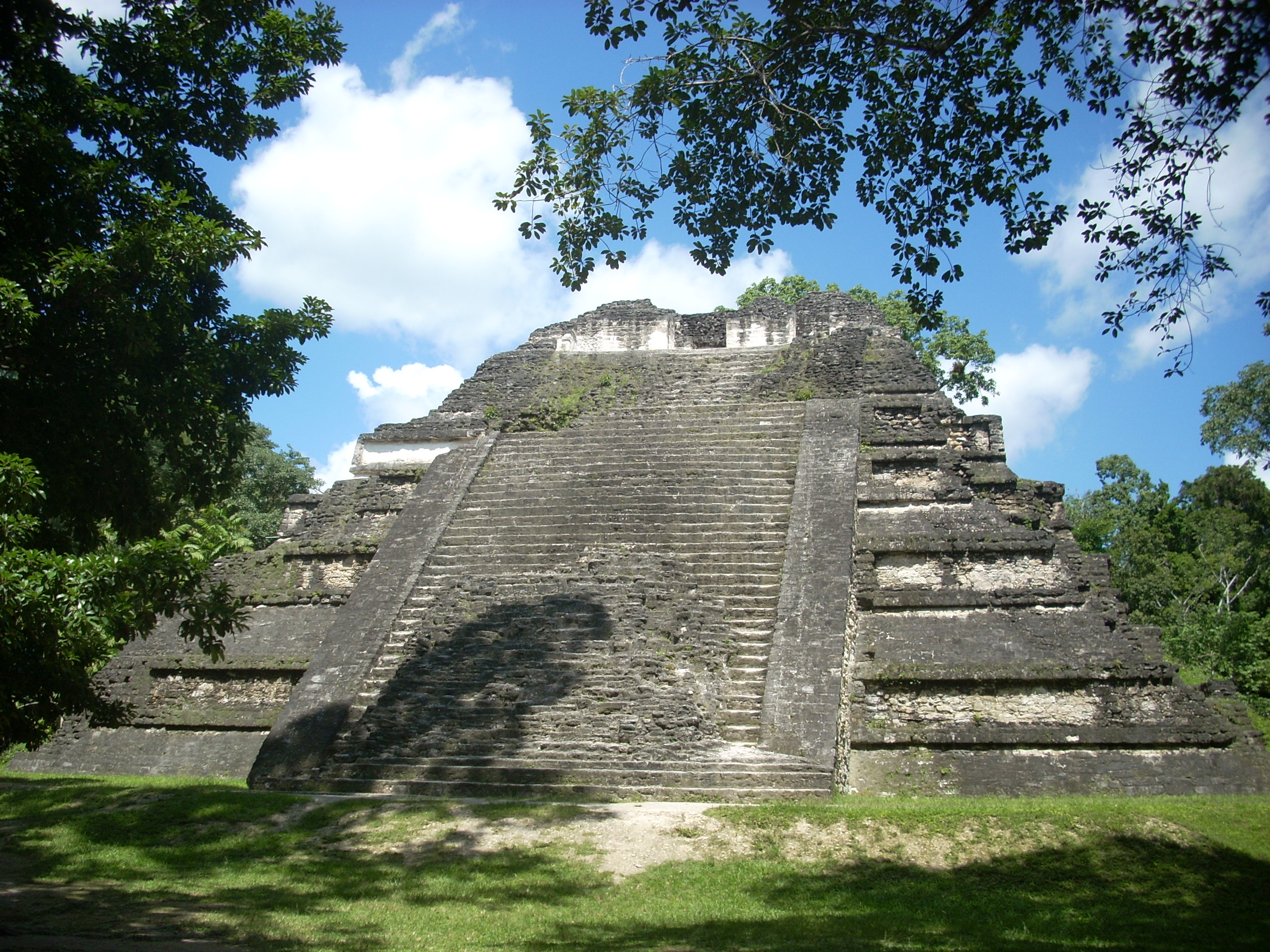
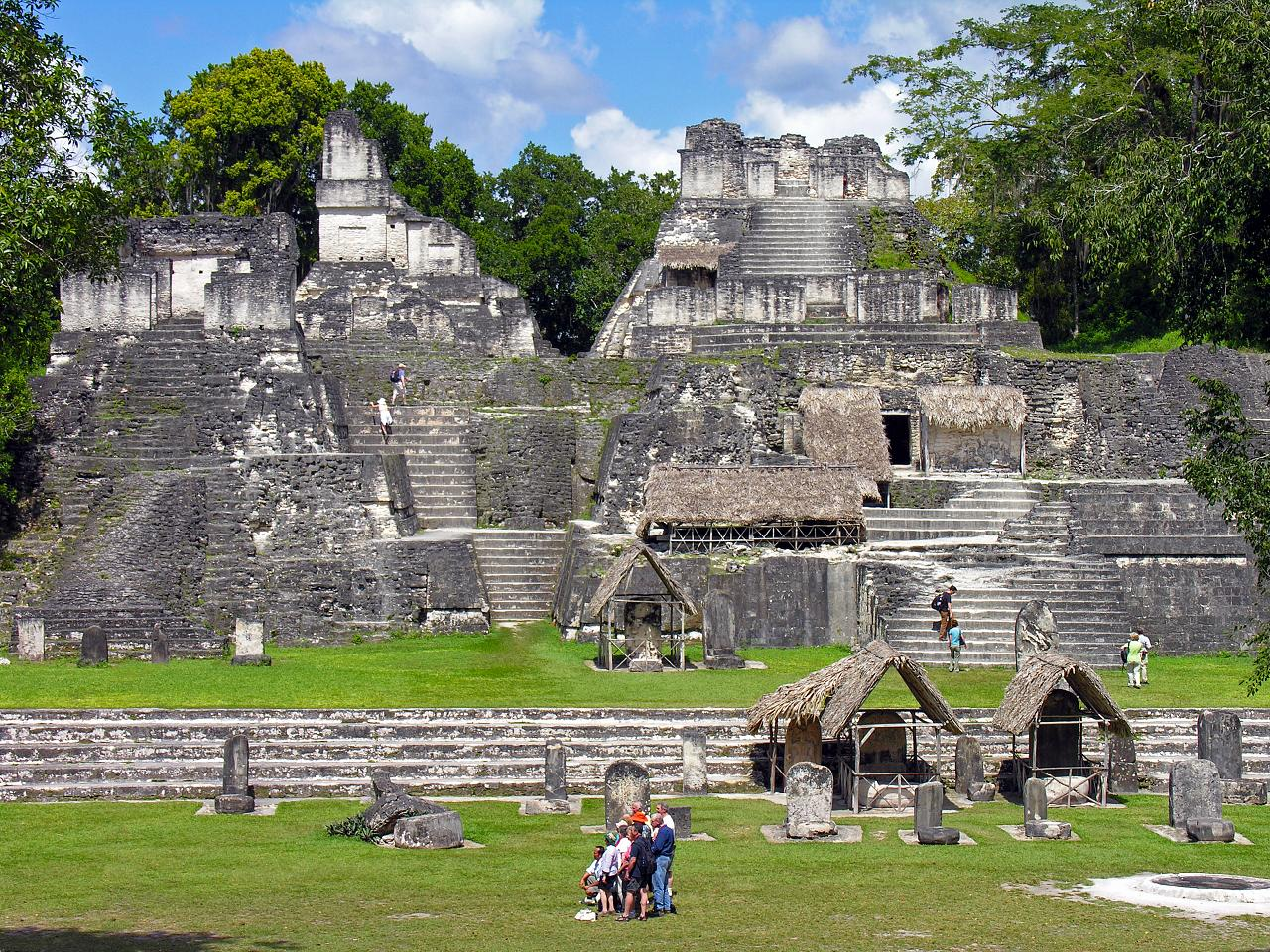
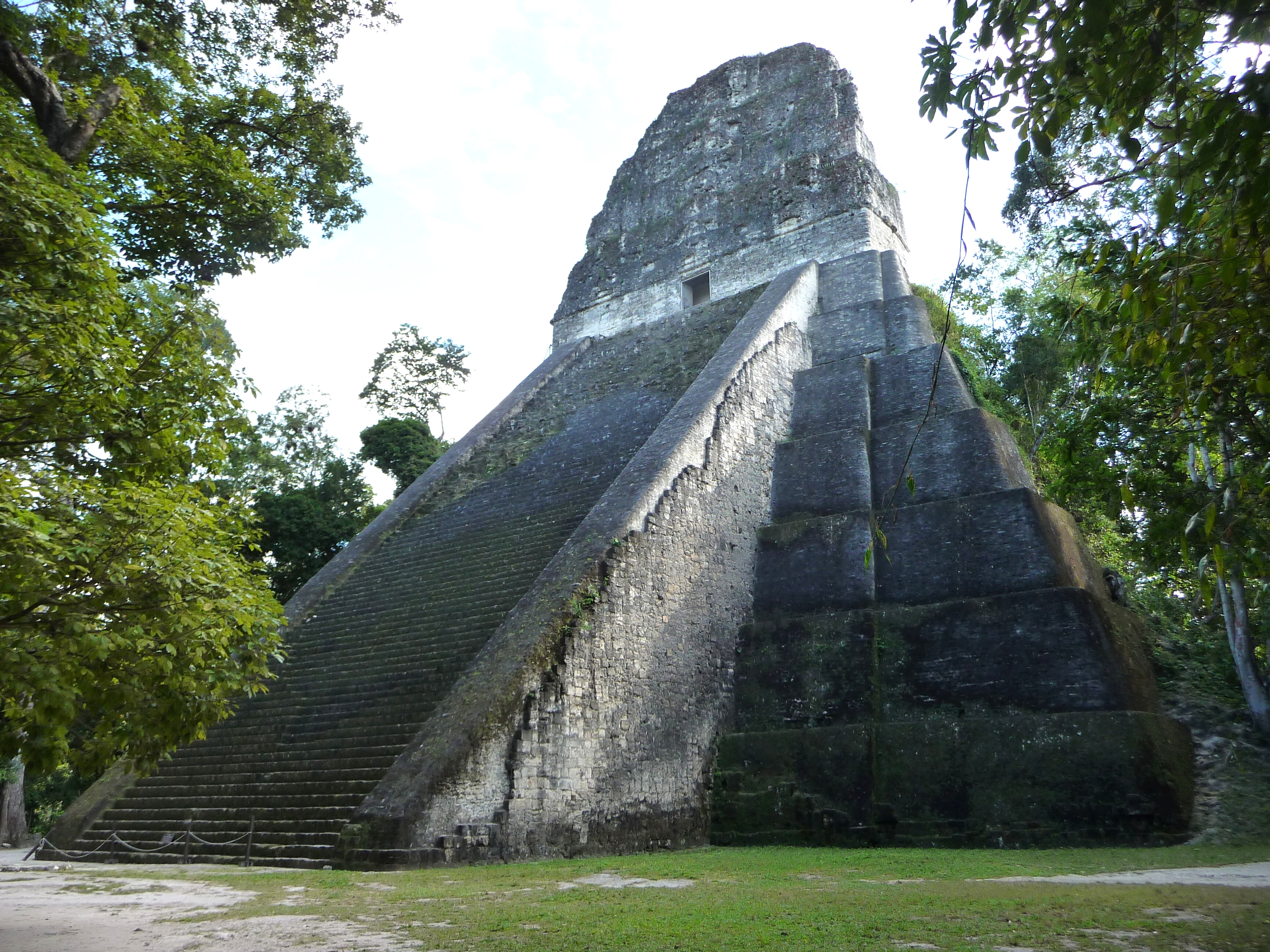
- Temple of the Great Jaguar Temple of the Masks Temple IV Lost World Temple 33 Temple V

- Location within Mesoamerica Location within Guatemala
- 17°13′19″N 89°37′25″W
- Periods: Early Classic to Late Classic
- Cultures: Maya civilization
- Location: Flores, Petén Department, Guatemala
- Region: Petén Basin

History
- Built: 4th century BC
- Abandoned: c. 900

UNESCO World Heritage Site
- Official name: Tikal National Park
- Type: Mixed
- Criteria: i, iii, iv, ix, x
- Designated: 1979 (3rd session)
- Reference no.: 64
- Region: Latin America and the Caribbean

Tikal (/tiˈkɑːl/; Tik'al in modern Mayan orthography) is the ruin of an ancient city, which was likely to have been called Yax Mutal, found in a rainforest in Guatemala. One of the largest archaeological sites and urban centers of the pre-Columbian Maya civilization, it is located in the archaeological region of the Petén Basin in what is now the Petén Department in northern Guatemala. The site is part of Guatemala's Tikal National Park, which was declared a UNESCO World Heritage Site in 1979.

Tikal was the capital of a state that became one of the most powerful kingdoms of the ancient Maya. Though monumental architecture at the site dates back as far as the 4th century BC, Tikal reached its apogee during the Classic Period, c. 200 to 900. During this time, the city dominated much of the Maya region politically, economically, and militarily, while interacting with areas throughout Mesoamerica such as the great metropolis of Teotihuacan in the distant Valley of Mexico. There is evidence that one of Tikal's great ruling dynasties was founded by conquerors from Teotihuacan in the 4th century AD. Following the end of the Late Classic Period, no new major monuments were built at Tikal and there is evidence that elite palaces were burned. These events were coupled with a gradual population decline, culminating with the site's abandonment by the end of the 10th century.

More has been uncovered about Tikal compared to other larger lowland Mayan cities, thanks to its long dynastic ruler list, which has allowed for the discovery of these rulers' tombs and investigation into their monuments, temples and palaces.

After centuries of abandonment, the site was first explored in the modern era in 1848. Tikal National Park was established in 1955, protecting the site and 570 square kilometers (220 sq mi) of surrounding tropical forests, savannas, and wetlands within the Maya Biosphere Reserve.

== Etymology ==
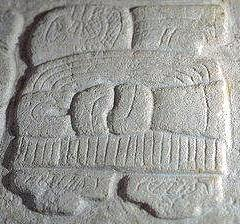
Emblem glyph for Tikal (Mutal)

The name Tikal may be derived from ti ak'al in the Yucatec Maya language; it is said to be a relatively modern name meaning 'at the waterhole'. The name was apparently applied to one of the site's ancient reservoirs by hunters and travelers in the region. It has alternatively been interpreted as meaning 'the place of the voices' in the Itzaʼ Maya language. Tikal, however, is not the ancient name for the site but rather the name adopted shortly after its discovery in the 1840s. Hieroglyphic inscriptions at the ruins refer to the ancient city as Yax Mutal or Yax Mutul, meaning 'First Mutal'. Tikal may have come to have been called this because Dos Pilas also came to use the same emblem glyph; the rulers of the city presumably wanted to distinguish themselves as the first city to bear the name. The kingdom as a whole was simply called Mutul, which is the reading of the "hair bundle" emblem glyph seen in the accompanying photo. Its precise meaning remains obscure.

== Geography ==
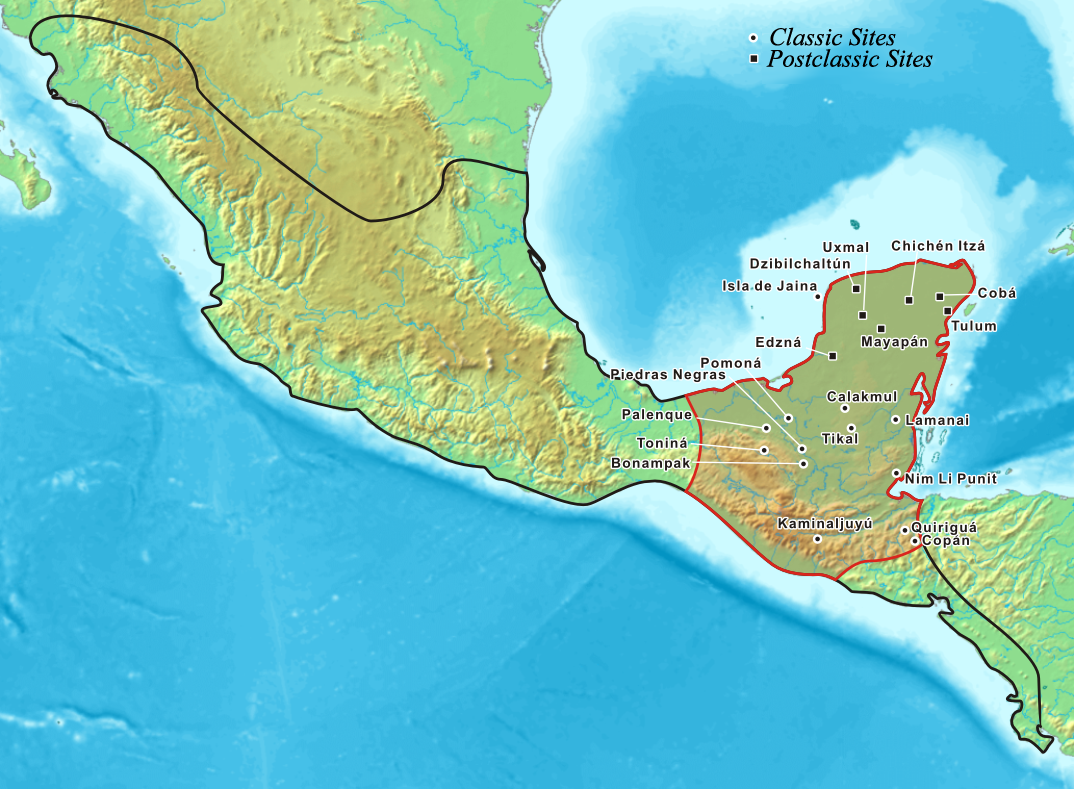
The Maya area within the Mesoamerican region. Both Tikal and Calakmul lie near the center of the area.

The closest large modern settlements are Flores and Santa Elena, approximately 64 kilometers (40 mi) by road to the southwest. Tikal is approximately 303 kilometers (188 mi) north of Guatemala City. It is 19 kilometers (12 mi) south of the contemporary Maya city of Uaxactun and 30 kilometers (19 mi) northwest of Yaxha. The city was located 100 kilometers (62 mi) southeast of its great Classic Period rival, Calakmul, and 85 kilometers (53 mi) northwest of Calakmul's ally Caracol, now in Belize.

The city has been completely mapped and covered an area greater than 16 square kilometers (6.2 sq mi) that included about 3,000 structures. The topography of the site consists of a series of parallel limestone ridges rising above swampy lowlands. The major architecture of the site is clustered upon areas of higher ground and linked by raised causeways spanning the swamps. The area around Tikal has been declared as the Tikal National Park and the preserved area covers 570 square kilometers (220 sq mi). It was created on 26 May 1955 under the auspices of the Instituto de Antropología e Historia and was the first protected area in Guatemala.

The ruins lie among the tropical rainforests of northern Guatemala that formed the cradle of lowland Maya civilization. The city itself was located among abundant fertile upland soils, and may have dominated a natural east–west trade route across the Yucatán Peninsula. Conspicuous trees at the Tikal park include gigantic Kapok tree (Ceiba pentandra) the sacred tree of the Maya; tropical cedar (Cedrela odorata), and Honduras mahogany (Swietenia macrophylla). Regarding the fauna, agoutis, white-nosed coatis, gray foxes, Geoffroy's spider monkeys, howler monkeys, harpy eagles, falcons, ocellated turkeys, guans, toucans, green parrots and leafcutter ants can be seen there regularly. Jaguars, ocelots, and cougars are also said to roam in the park.

Tikal had no water other than what was collected from rainwater and stored in ten reservoirs. Archaeologists working in Tikal during the 20th century refurbished one of these ancient reservoirs to store water for their own use. The average annual rainfall at Tikal is 1,945 millimeters (76.6 in). However, the arrival of rain was often unpredictable, and long periods of drought could occur before the crops ripened, which severely threatened the inhabitants of the city.

== Population ==
Population estimates for Tikal vary from 10,000 to as high as 90,000 inhabitants. The population of Tikal began a continuous curve of growth starting in the Preclassic Period (approximately 2000 BC – AD 200), with a peak in the Late Classic with the population growing rapidly from AD 700 through to 830, followed by a sharp decline. For the 120 square kilometers (46 sq mi) area falling within the earthwork defenses of the hinterland, the peak population is estimated at 517 per square kilometer (1340 per square mile). In an area within a 12 kilometers (7.5 mi) radius of the site core, peak population is estimated at 120,000; population density is estimated at 265 per square kilometer (689 per square mile). In a region within a 25 kilometers (16 mi) radius of the site core and including some satellite sites, peak population is estimated at 425,000 with a density of 216 per square kilometer (515 per square mile). These population figures are even more impressive because of the extensive swamplands that were unsuitable for habitation or agriculture. However, some archaeologists, such as David Webster, believe these figures to be far too high.

== Preclassic ==
There are traces of early agriculture at the site dating as far back as 1000 BC, in the Middle Preclassic. A cache of Mamon ceramics dating from about 700–400 BC were found in a sealed chultun, a subterranean bottle-shaped chamber.

Major construction at Tikal was already taking place in the Late Preclassic period, first appearing around 400–300 BC, including the building of major pyramids and platforms, although the city was still dwarfed by sites further north such as El Mirador and Nakbe. At this time, Tikal participated in the widespread Chikanel culture that dominated the Central and Northern Maya areas at this time – a region that included the entire Yucatán Peninsula including northern and eastern Guatemala and all of Belize.

Two temples dating to Late Chikanel times had masonry-walled superstructures that may have been corbel-vaulted, although this has not been proven. One of these had elaborate paintings on the outer walls showing human figures against a scrollwork background, painted in yellow, black, pink and red.

In the 1st century AD, rich burials first appeared and Tikal underwent a political and cultural florescence as its giant northern neighbors declined. At the end of the Late Preclassic, the Izapan style art and architecture from the Pacific Coast began to influence Tikal, as demonstrated by a broken sculpture from the acropolis and early murals at the city.

== Early Classic ==
Dynastic rulership among the lowland Maya is most deeply rooted at Tikal. According to later hieroglyphic records, the dynasty was founded by Yax Ehb Xook, perhaps in the 1st century AD. At the beginning of the Early Classic, power in the Maya region was concentrated at Tikal and Calakmul, in the core of the Maya heartland.

Tikal may have benefited from the collapse of the large Preclassic states such as El Mirador. In the Early Classic Tikal rapidly developed into the most dynamic city in the Maya region, stimulating the development of other nearby Maya cities.

The site, however, was often at war and inscriptions tell of alliances and conflict with other Maya states, including Uaxactun, Caracol, Naranjo and Calakmul. The site was defeated at the end of the Early Classic by Caracol, which rose to take Tikal's place as the paramount center in the southern Maya lowlands. The earlier part of the Early Classic saw hostilities between Tikal and its neighbor Uaxactun, with Uaxactun recording the capture of prisoners from Tikal.

There appears to have been a breakdown in the male succession by AD 317, when Lady Unen Bahlam conducted a Kʼatun-ending ceremony, apparently as queen of the city.

=== Tikal and Teotihuacan ===
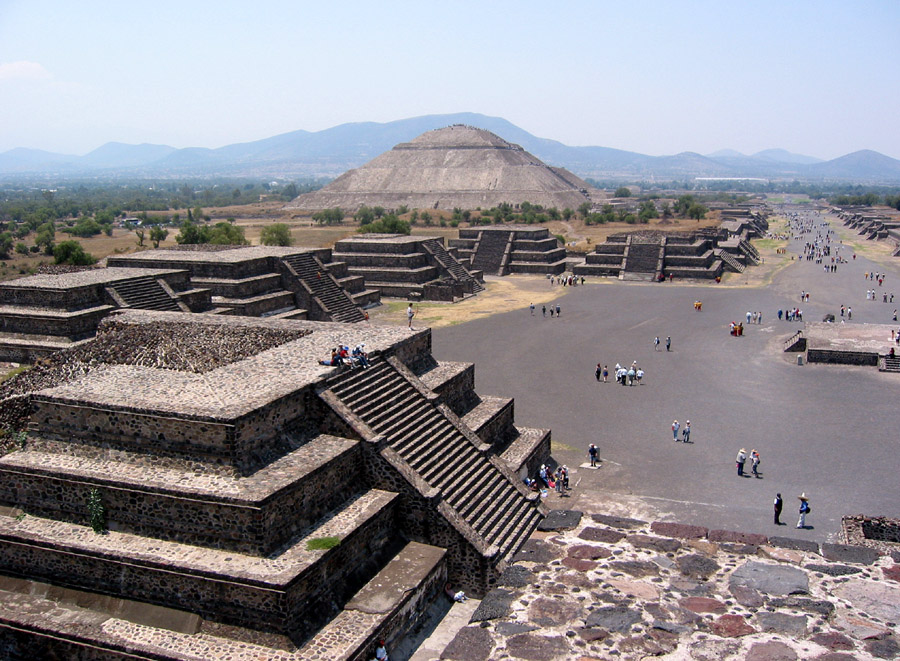
The great metropolis of Teotihuacan in the Valley of Mexico appears to have decisively intervened in Tikal politics.

As early as 200 AD, Teotihuacan had embassies in Tikal.

The fourteenth king of Tikal was Chak Tok Ichʼaak (Great Jaguar Paw). Chak Tok Ichʼaak built a palace that was preserved and developed by later rulers until it became the core of the Central Acropolis. Little is known about Chak Tok Ichʼaak except that he was killed on 14 January 378 AD. On the same day, Siyaj Kʼakʼ (Fire Is Born) arrived from the west, having passed through El Peru, a site to the west of Tikal, on 8 January. On Stela 31 he is named as "Lord of the West". Siyaj Kʼakʼ was probably a foreign general serving a figure represented by a non-Maya hieroglyph of a spearthrower combined with an owl, a glyph that is well known from the great metropolis of Teotihuacan in the distant Valley of Mexico. Spearthrower Owl may even have been the ruler of Teotihuacan. These recorded events strongly suggest that Siyaj Kʼakʼ led a Teotihuacan invasion that defeated the native Tikal king, who was captured and immediately executed. Siyaj Kʼakʼ appears to have been aided by a powerful political faction at Tikal itself; roughly at the time of the conquest, a group of Teotihuacan natives were apparently residing near the Lost World complex. He also exerted control over other cities in the area, including Uaxactun, where he became king, but did not take the throne of Tikal for himself. Within a year, the son of Spearthrower Owl by the name of Yax Nuun Ahiin I (First Crocodile) had been installed as the fifteenth king of Tikal while he was still a boy, being enthroned on 13 September 379. He reigned for 47 years as king of Tikal, and remained a vassal of Siyaj Kʼakʼ for as long as the latter lived. It seems likely that Yax Nuun Ayiin I took a wife from the preexisting, defeated, Tikal dynasty and thus legitimized the right to rule of his son, Siyaj Chan Kʼawiil II.

Río Azul, a small site 100 kilometers (62 mi) northeast of Tikal, was conquered by the latter during the reign of Yax Nuun Ayiin I. The site became an outpost of Tikal, shielding it from hostile cities further north, and also became a trade link to the Caribbean.

Although the new rulers of Tikal were foreign, their descendants were rapidly Mayanized. Tikal became the key ally and trading partner of Teotihuacan in the Maya lowlands. After being conquered by Teotihuacan, Tikal rapidly dominated the northern and eastern Peten. Uaxactun, together with smaller towns in the region, were absorbed into Tikal's kingdom. Other sites, such as Bejucal and Motul de San José near Lake Petén Itzá became vassals of their more powerful neighbor to the north. By the middle of the 5th century, Tikal had a core territory of at least 25 kilometers (16 mi) in every direction.

Around the 5th century, an impressive system of fortifications consisting of ditches and earthworks was built along the northern periphery of Tikal's hinterland, joining up with the natural defenses provided by large areas of swampland lying to the east and west of the city. Additional fortifications were probably also built to the south. These defenses protected Tikal's core population and agricultural resources, encircling an area of approximately 120 square kilometers (46 sq mi). Recent research suggests that the earthworks served as a water collection system rather than a defensive purpose.

=== Tikal and Copán ===
In the 5th century, the power of the city reached as far south as Copán, whose founder Kʼinich Yax Kʼukʼ Moʼ was clearly connected with Tikal. Copán itself was not in an ethnically Maya region and the founding of the Copán dynasty probably involved the direct intervention of Tikal. Kʼinich Yax Kukʼ Moʼ arrived in Copán in December 426, and bone analysis of his remains shows that he passed his childhood and youth at Tikal. An individual known as Ajaw Kʼukʼ Mo' (lord Kʼukʼ Moʼ) is referred to in an early text at Tikal and may well be the same person. His tomb had Teotihuacan characteristics and he was depicted in later portraits dressed in the warrior garb of Teotihuacan. Hieroglyphic texts refer to him as "Lord of the West", much like Siyaj Kʼakʼ. At the same time, in late 426, Copán founded the nearby site of Quiriguá, possibly sponsored by Tikal itself. The founding of these two centers may have been part of an effort to impose Tikal's authority upon the southeastern portion of the Maya region. The interaction between these sites and Tikal was intense over the next three centuries.

A long-running rivalry between Tikal and Calakmul began in the 6th century, with each of the two cities forming its own network of mutually hostile alliances arrayed against each other in what has been likened to a long-running war between two Maya superpowers. The kings of these two capitals adopted the title kaloomteʼ, a term that has not been precisely translated but that implies something akin to "high king".

The early 6th century saw another queen ruling the city, known only as the "Lady of Tikal", who was very likely a daughter of Chak Tok Ichʼaak II. She seems never to have ruled in her own right, rather being partnered with male co-rulers. The first of these was Kaloomteʼ Bahlam, who seems to have had a long career as a general at Tikal before becoming co-ruler and 19th in the dynastic sequence. The Lady of Tikal herself seems not have been counted in the dynastic numbering. It appears she was later paired with lord "Bird Claw", who is presumed to be the otherwise unknown 20th ruler.

== Late Classic ==
=== Tikal hiatus ===
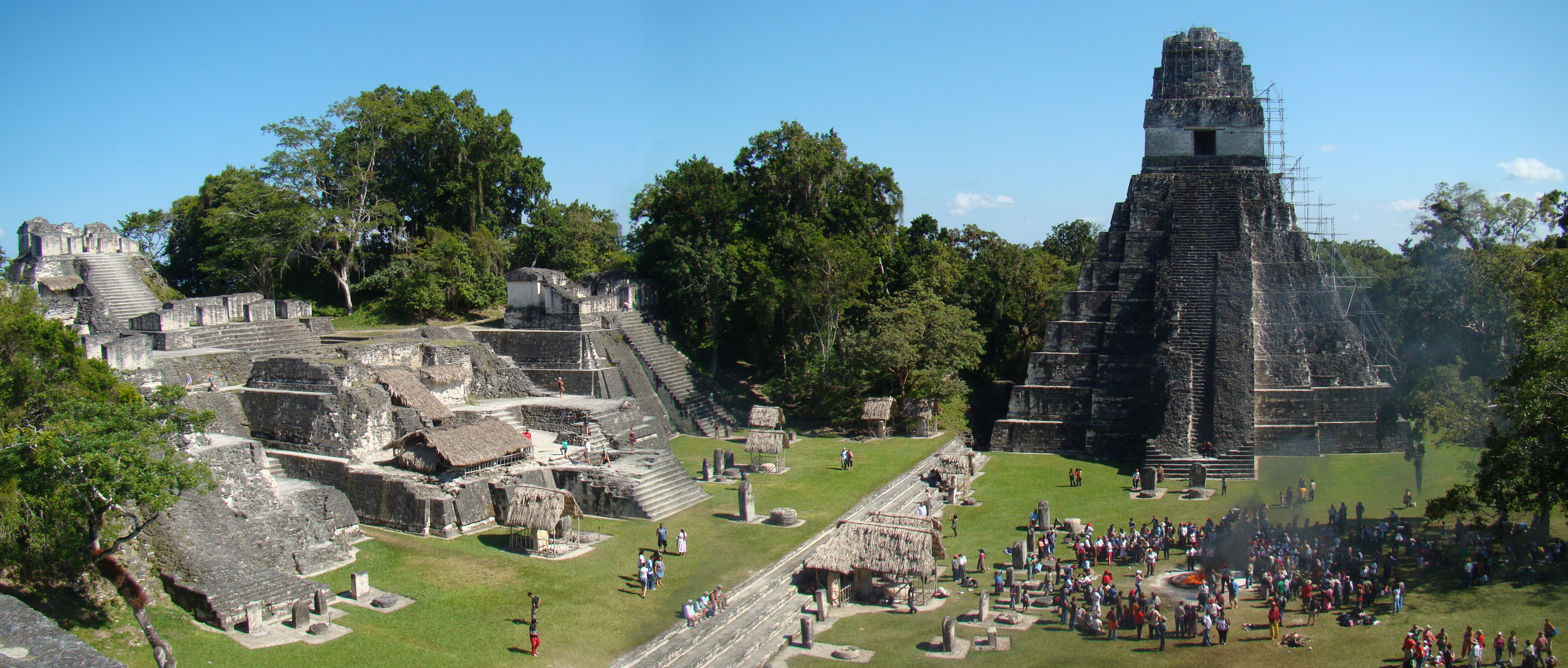
The main plaza during winter solstice celebrations

In the mid-6th century, Caracol seems to have allied with Calakmul and defeated Tikal, closing the Early Classic. The "Tikal hiatus" refers to a period between the late 6th to late 7th century where there was a lapse in the writing of inscriptions and large-scale construction at Tikal. In the latter half of the 6th century AD, a serious crisis befell the city, with no new stelae being erected and with widespread deliberate mutilation of public sculpture. This hiatus in activity at Tikal was long unexplained until later epigraphic decipherments identified that the period was prompted by Tikal's comprehensive defeat at the hands of Calakmul and the Caracol polity in AD 562, a defeat that seems to have resulted in the capture and sacrifice of the king of Tikal. The badly eroded Altar 21 at Caracol described how Tikal suffered this disastrous defeat in a major war in April 562. It seems that Caracol was an ally of Calakmul in the wider conflict between that city and Tikal, with the defeat of Tikal having a lasting impact upon the city. Tikal was not sacked but its power and influence were broken. After its great victory, Caracol grew rapidly and some of Tikal's population may have been forcibly relocated there. During the hiatus period, at least one ruler of Tikal took refuge with Janaabʼ Pakal of Palenque, another of Calakmul's victims. Calakmul itself thrived during Tikal's long hiatus period.

The beginning of the Tikal hiatus has served as a marker by which archaeologists commonly subdivide the Classic period of Mesoamerican chronology into the Early and Late Classic.

=== Tikal and Dos Pilas ===
In 629, Tikal founded Dos Pilas, some 110 kilometers (68 mi) to the southwest, as a military outpost in order to control trade along the course of the Pasión River. Bʼalaj Chan Kʼawiil was installed on the throne of the new outpost at the age of four, in 635. When he was older, for many years he served as a loyal vassal fighting for his brother, the king of Tikal. Roughly twenty years later, Dos Pilas was attacked by Calakmul and was soundly defeated. Bʼalaj Chan Kʼawiil was captured by the king of Calakmul but, instead of being sacrificed, he was re-instated on his throne as a vassal of his former enemy.

He attacked Tikal in 657, forcing Nuun Ujol Chaak, then king of Tikal, to temporarily abandon the city. The first two rulers of Dos Pilas continued to use the Mutal emblem glyph of Tikal, and they probably felt that they had a legitimate claim to the throne of Tikal itself. For some reason, Bʼalaj Chan Kʼawiil was not installed as the new ruler of Tikal; instead he stayed at Dos Pilas. Tikal counterattacked against Dos Pilas in 672, driving Bʼalaj Chan Kʼawiil into an exile that lasted five years. Calakmul tried to encircle Tikal within an area dominated by its allies, such as El Peru, Dos Pilas, and Caracol.

In 682, Jasaw Chan Kʼawiil I erected the first dated monument at Tikal in 120 years and claimed the title of kaloomteʼ, so ending the hiatus. He initiated a program of new construction and turned the tables on Calakmul when, in 695, he captured the enemy noble and threw the enemy state into a long decline from which it never fully recovered. After this, Calakmul never again erected a monument celebrating a military victory.

=== Tikal after Teotihuacan ===
By the 7th century, there was no active Teotihuacan presence at any Maya site and the center of Teotihuacan had been razed by 700. Even after this, formal war attire illustrated on monuments was Teotihuacan style. Jasaw Chan Kʼawiil I and his heir Yikʼin Chan Kʼawiil continued hostilities against Calakmul and its allies and imposed firm regional control over the area around Tikal, extending as far as the territory around Lake Petén Itzá. These two rulers were responsible for much of the impressive architecture visible today.

In 738, Quiriguá, a vassal of Copán, Tikal's key ally in the south, switched allegiance to Calakmul, defeated Copán and gained its own independence. It appears that this was a conscious effort on the part of Calakmul to bring about the collapse of Tikal's southern allies. This upset the balance of power in the southern Maya area and lead to a steady decline in the fortunes of Copán.

In the 8th century, the rulers of Tikal collected monuments from across the city and erected them in front of the North Acropolis. By the late 8th century and early 9th century, activity at Tikal slowed. Impressive architecture was still built but few hieroglyphic inscriptions refer to later rulers.

== Terminal Classic ==
By the 9th century, the crisis of the Classic Maya collapse was sweeping across the region, with populations plummeting and city after city falling into silence. Increasingly endemic warfare in the Maya region caused Tikal's supporting population to heavily concentrate close to the city itself, accelerating the use of intensive agriculture and the corresponding environmental decline. Construction continued at the beginning of the century, with the erection of Temple 3, the last of the city's major pyramids, and the erection of monuments to mark the 19th Kʼatun in 810. The beginning of the 10th Bakʼtun in 830 passed uncelebrated, and marks the beginning of a 60-year hiatus, probably resulting from the collapse of central control in the city. During this hiatus, satellite sites traditionally under Tikal's control began to erect their own monuments featuring local rulers and using the Mutal emblem glyph, with Tikal apparently lacking the authority or the power to crush these bids for independence. In 849, Jewel Kʼawiil is mentioned on a stela at Seibal as visiting that city as the Divine Lord of Tikal but he is not recorded elsewhere and Tikal's once-great power was little more than a memory. The sites of Ixlu and Jimbal had by now inherited the once exclusive Mutal emblem glyph.

As Tikal and its hinterland reached peak population, the area suffered deforestation, soil erosion and nutrient loss followed by a rapid decline in population levels. Recent analysis also indicates that the city's freshwater sources became highly contaminated with mercury, phosphate and cyanobacteria leading to the accumulation of toxins. Tikal and its immediate surroundings seem to have lost most of their population between 830 and 950 and central authority seems to have collapsed rapidly. There is not much evidence from Tikal that the city was directly affected by the endemic warfare that afflicted parts of the Maya region during the Terminal Classic, although an influx of refugees from the Petexbatún region may have exacerbated problems resulting from the already stretched environmental resources.

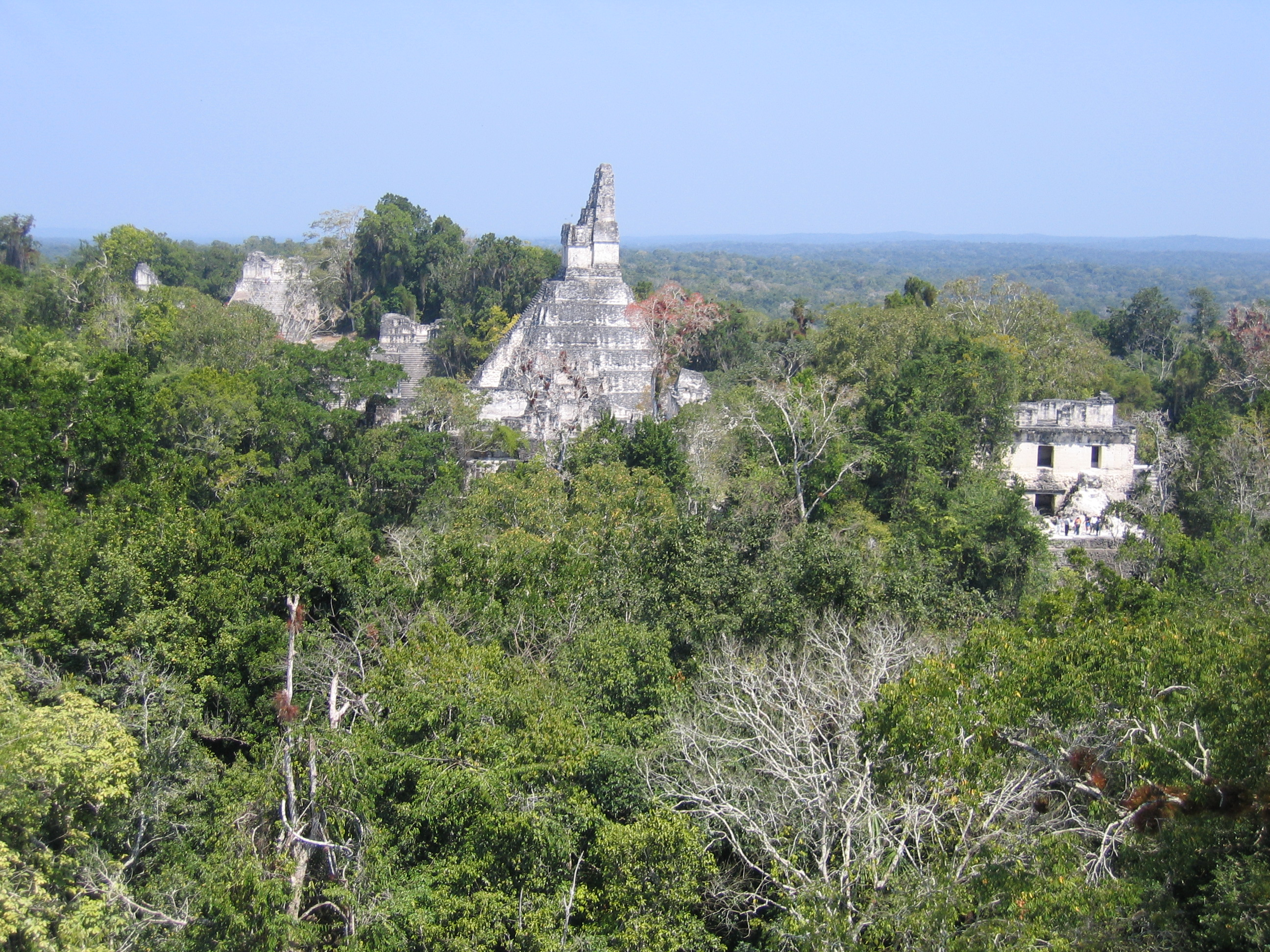
The site core seen from the south, with Temple I at center, the North Acropolis to the left and Central Acropolis to the right

In the latter half of the 9th century, there was an attempt to revive royal power at the much-diminished city of Tikal, as evidenced by a stela erected in the Great Plaza by Jasaw Chan Kʼawiil II in 869. This was the last monument erected at Tikal before the city finally fell into silence. The former satellites of Tikal, such as Jimbal and Uaxactun, did not last much longer, erecting their final monuments in 889. By the end of the 9th century, the vast majority of Tikal's population had deserted the city, its royal palaces were occupied by squatters and simple thatched dwellings were being erected in the city's ceremonial plazas. The squatters blocked some doorways in the rooms they reoccupied in the monumental structures of the site and left rubbish that included a mixture of domestic refuse and non-utilitarian items such as musical instruments. These inhabitants reused the earlier monuments for their own ritual activities, far removed from those of the royal dynasty that had erected them. Some monuments were vandalized and some were moved to new locations. Before its final abandonment all respect for the old rulers had disappeared, with the tombs of the North Acropolis being explored for jade and the easier-to-find tombs were looted. After 950, Tikal was all but deserted, although a remnant population may have survived in perishable huts interspersed among the ruins. Even these final inhabitants abandoned the city in the 10th or 11th centuries and the rainforest claimed the ruins for the next thousand years. Some of Tikal's population may have migrated to the Peten Lakes region, which remained heavily populated in spite of a plunge in population levels in the first half of the 9th century.

The most likely cause of collapse at Tikal is overpopulation and agrarian failure. The fall of Tikal was a blow to the heart of Classic Maya civilization, the city having been at the forefront of courtly life, art and architecture for over a thousand years, with an ancient ruling dynasty. However, new research regarding paleoenvironmental proxies from the Tikal reservoir system suggests that a meteorological drought may have led to the abandonment of Tikal, fouling some reservoirs near the temple and palace with algae blooms, while other reservoirs remained drinkable. Buildings were painted with mercury-bearing cinnabar, which were washed off by rain and polluted some reservoirs. Works of Kohler and colleagues showed that this city reached an unsustainable level of inequalities at the end.

== Rulers ==
The following table synthesizes the dynastic sequence, regnal dates, major geopolitical events, and primary monumental dedications of the rulers of Mutal (Tikal):

Dynastic Succession and Major Historical Events of Yax Mutal (Tikal)
Succession No.	Ruler Name	Regnal Period / Dates	Geopolitical Events & Alliances	Associated Monuments
1	Yax Ehb Xook	c. AD 90	Founding of the Mutal royal dynasty; early Preclassic-Classic transition.	Burial 85 (North Acropolis)
14	Chak Tok Ichʼaak I	?–378 (d. 14 Jan 378)	Defeated and executed during the Teotihuacan-sponsored arrival of Siyaj K'ak'.	Stela 39, Central Acropolis core
15	Yax Nuun Ahiin I	379–404+	Installed as vassal under Siyaj Kʼakʼ; introduction of Teotihuacan warrior iconography.	Stela 4, Stela 18, Burial 10
16	Siyaj Chan Kʼawiil II	411–456	Re-assertion of Maya iconography while maintaining Teotihuacan ties; consolidation of Petén hegemony.	Stela 31, Temple 33 (Burial 48)
26	Nuun Ujol Chaak	c. 650–679	Intense conflict with Calakmul and Dos Pilas; temporarily expelled from Tikal.	Seibal Stela 22 references
27	Jasaw Chan Kʼawiil I	682–734	End of the Tikal Hiatus; major victory over Calakmul (AD 695); initiation of monumental pyramid construction.	Temple I (Burial 116), Stela 16, Altar 5
28	Yikʼin Chan Kʼawiil	734–766	Defeated Calakmul, El Perú, and Naranjo; golden age of monumental architecture.	Temple IV (Lintel 3), Stela 5, Stela 21
29	Yax Nuun Ahiin II	768–794+	Governance during the onset of regional instability; dedication of twin-pyramid complexes.	Group Q (Stela 22, Altar 10), Stela 19
31	Jasaw Chan Kʼawiil II	c. 869	Final recorded ruler; erection of the last dated monument during the Terminal Classic decline.	Stela 11 (Great Plaza)

== Modern history ==
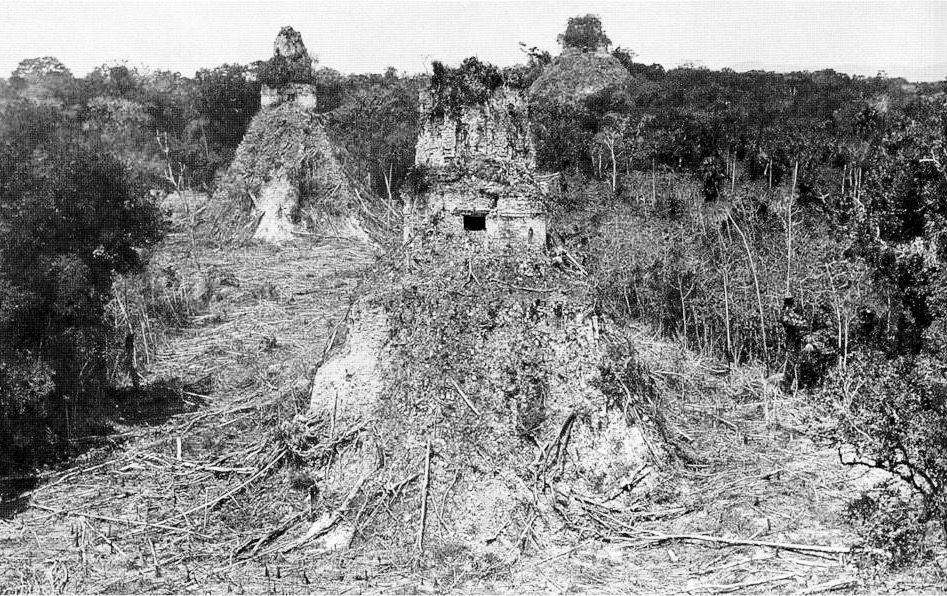
One of Maudsley's photos of Tikal from 1882, taken after vegetation had been cleared

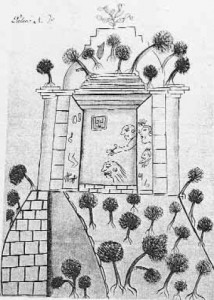
Drawing of Tikal by mid-19th-century visitor Eusebio Lara

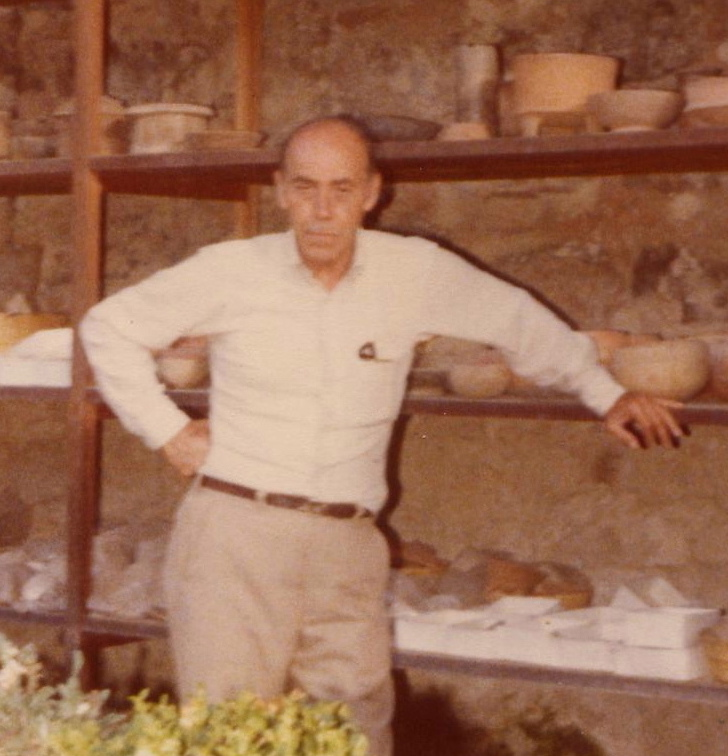
Archeologist Edwin M. Shook, field director of the Tikal Project; Shook was also instrumental in having Tikal established as Guatemala's first National Park.

In 1525, the Spanish conquistador Hernán Cortés passed within a few kilometers of the ruins of Tikal but did not mention them in his letters. After Spanish friar Andrés de Avendaño became lost in the Petén forests in early 1696 he described a ruin that may well have been Tikal.

As is often the case with huge ancient ruins, knowledge of the site was never completely lost in the region. It seems that local people never forgot about Tikal and they guided Guatemalan expeditions to the ruins in the 1850s. Some second- or third-hand accounts of Tikal appeared in print starting in the 17th century, continuing through the writings of John Lloyd Stephens in the early 19th century (Stephens and his illustrator Frederick Catherwood heard rumors of a lost city, with white building tops towering above the jungle, during their 1839–40 travels in the region). Because of the site's remoteness from modern towns, however, no explorers visited Tikal until Modesto Méndez and Ambrosio Tut, respectively the commissioner and the governor of Petén, visited it in 1848. Artist Eusebio Lara accompanied them and their account was published in Germany in 1853. Several other expeditions came to further investigate, map, and photograph Tikal in the 19th century (including Alfred P. Maudslay in 1881–82) and the early 20th century. Pioneering archaeologists started to clear, map and record the ruins in the 1880s.

In 1951, a small airstrip was built at the ruins, which previously could only be reached by several days' travel through the jungle on foot or mule. Tikal National Park was established on May 26, 1955 under government decree by the Ministry of Education, via the Instituto de Antropología e Historia, advised by Dr. Adolfo Molina Orantes and under the government of Carlos Castillo Armas.

From 1956 to 1970 the University of Pennsylvania's Tikal Project mapped the city on a scale not previously seen in the Maya area and carried out major archaeological excavations to restore many of the structures. Excavations directed by Edwin M. Shook and later by William Coe of the university investigated the North Acropolis and the Central Plaza from 1957 to 1969. The Tikal Project recorded over 200 monuments at the site. In 1979, the Guatemalan government began a further archaeological project at Tikal, which continued through to 1984.

Filmmaker George Lucas used Tikal as a filming location for the fictional moon Yavin 4 in the first Star Wars film, which premiered in 1977. Subsequent Star Wars movie Rogue One (2016) and season 2 of TV series Andor (2025) were also filmed at Tikal for the same fictional location.

Temple I at Tikal was featured on the reverse of the 50 centavo banknote.

Eon Productions used the site for the James Bond film Moonraker.

Tikal is now one of Guatemala's most significant tourist attractions. A site museum was completed in 1964.

== Site description ==
The site core

Tikal has been partially restored by the University of Pennsylvania and the government of Guatemala. It was one of the largest of the Classic period Maya cities and was one of the largest cities in the Americas. The architecture of the ancient city is built from limestone and includes the remains of temples that tower over 70 meters (230 ft) high, large royal palaces, in addition to a number of smaller pyramids, palaces, residences, administrative buildings, platforms and inscribed stone monuments. There is even a building which seemed to have been a jail, originally with wooden bars across the windows and doors. There are also seven courts for playing the Mesoamerican ballgame, including a set of 3 in the Seven Temples Plaza, a unique feature in Mesoamerica.

The limestone used for construction was local and quarried on-site. The depressions formed by the extraction of stone for building were plastered to waterproof them and were used as reservoirs, together with some waterproofed natural depressions. The main plazas were surfaced with stucco and laid at a gradient that channelled rainfall into a system of canals that fed the reservoirs.

The residential area of Tikal covers an estimated 60 square kilometers (23 sq mi), much of which has not yet been cleared, mapped, or excavated. The 16 square kilometers (6.2 sq mi) area around the site core has been intensively mapped; it may have enclosed an area of some 125 square kilometers (48 sq mi) (see below). A huge set of earthworks discovered by Dennis E. Puleston and Donald Callender in the 1960s rings Tikal with a 6-meter (20 ft) wide trench behind a rampart. Recently, a project exploring the defensive earthworks has shown that the scale of the earthworks is highly variable and that in many places it is inconsequential as a defensive feature. In addition, some parts of the earthwork were integrated into a canal system. The earthwork of Tikal varies significantly in coverage from what was originally proposed and it is much more complex and multifaceted than originally thought.

=== Causeways ===
By the Late Classic, a network of sacbeob (causeways) linked various parts of the city, running for several kilometers through its urban core. These linked the Great Plaza with Temple 4 (located about 750 meters (2,460 feet) to the west) and the Temple of the Inscriptions (about 1 kilometer (0.62 mi) to the southeast). These broad causeways were built of packed and plastered limestone and have been named after early explorers and archaeologists; the Maler, Maudslay, Tozzer and Méndez causeways. They assisted the passage of everyday traffic during the rain season and also served as dams.

The Maler Causeway runs north from behind Temple I to Group H. A large bas-relief is carved onto limestone bedrock upon the course of the causeway just south of Group H. It depicts two bound captives and dates to the Late Classic.

The Maudsley Causeway runs 0.8 kilometers (0.50 mi) northeast from Temple IV to Group H.

The Mendez Causeway runs southeast from the East Plaza to Temple VI, a distance of about 1.3 kilometers (0.81 mi).

The Tozzer Causeway runs west from the Great Plaza to Temple IV.

=== Water reservoirs ===
Water reservoirs played a critical role in the development and maintenance of both Tikal and other Maya cities. Though evidently serving as a body of water to draw from during the dry season and drought periods, water reservoirs also possessed a cultural and political significance. Hence, noteworthy investment was made by Maya societies into their reservoirs to ensure high water quality as well as consolidate political power.

Aside from Tikal, notable reservoirs are also present at Calakmul, Caracol, and Naranjo, among others.

==== Water quality maintenance ====
Human manipulation of the natural environment can result in unintended consequences. For instance, storing water not only can result in decreased water quality but also enable endemic diseases and pests, such as parasite-ridden flies and malaria-bearing mosquitoes, to flourish. Additionally, fungal species can proliferate in improperly stored or stressed maize which can produce chemicals like aflatoxin, a deadly liver carcinogen. However, the Maya were adept in constructing reservoirs that could guarantee high water quality. The Maya applied their knowledge of wetland biosphere ecology and ensured a balance of hydrophytic and macrophytic plants and other organisms. For example, the Maya widely adopted the dotleaf waterlily, Nymphaea ampla, in their reservoirs' bodies of water. Dotleaf waterlilies, have bluish undersides that prevent passage of light and thus minimizes algae growth, inhibits evaporation, provides shade for predators of pests, removes nitrogen through their roots, and serves as an indicator of acidic conditions as water lilies cannot tolerate low pH levels; low pH levels have been linked to tooth corrosion and disruption of gut homeostasis. Lastly, lining the reservoir with clay was also intelligently applied to help stabilize water pH.

The Corriental reservoir at Tikal contained a novel water filtration system that removed harmful microbes and insoluble or soluble toxins. Between ~ 2185 and 965 cal yr B.P. the drinking water in the Corriental reservoir was filtered through layers of Clinoptilolite and Mordenite zeolites, in addition to coarse to very coarse sand-sized quartz crystals.

In addition to physical filtration, geochemical analyses of sediment cores from the Temple and Palace reservoirs have revealed severe historical mercury contamination. This toxicity resulted primarily from the widespread ceremonial application of cinnabar-based pigments on monumental architecture and stelae throughout the Classic Period. Rainwater runoff continuously leached these toxic mineral compounds from plastered facades directly into the central urban catchment basins, rendering the immediate water supply biohazardous during prolonged meteorological droughts and contributing significantly to the structural stress of the city's central elite zones prior to its final abandonment.

==== Role in political power ====
A significant proportion of royal power rested in what the ruling party could materially provide for their subjects (i.e. water during annual drought through massive artificial reservoirs). Hence, water and by extension, reservoirs became a significant part of the Maya power structure. This also means that a way for Maya rulers to concentrate their power would be through proper water management. This created a feedback loop in which tools associated with water management became associated with Maya rulers. The association of clean water, water lilies, and royal power is amply illustrated in the iconography.

This also means that when water was mismanaged, the rulers were blamed for it. For example, in the Maya city of Caracol droughts peaked in the years 806, 829, 842, 857, 895, 909 921 and 935 A.D. Most importantly, the years between A.D. 804 and 938 show a 36% to 56% drop in precipitation. While the rulers were blamed and eventually moved away, the common people stayed.

=== Architectural groups ===
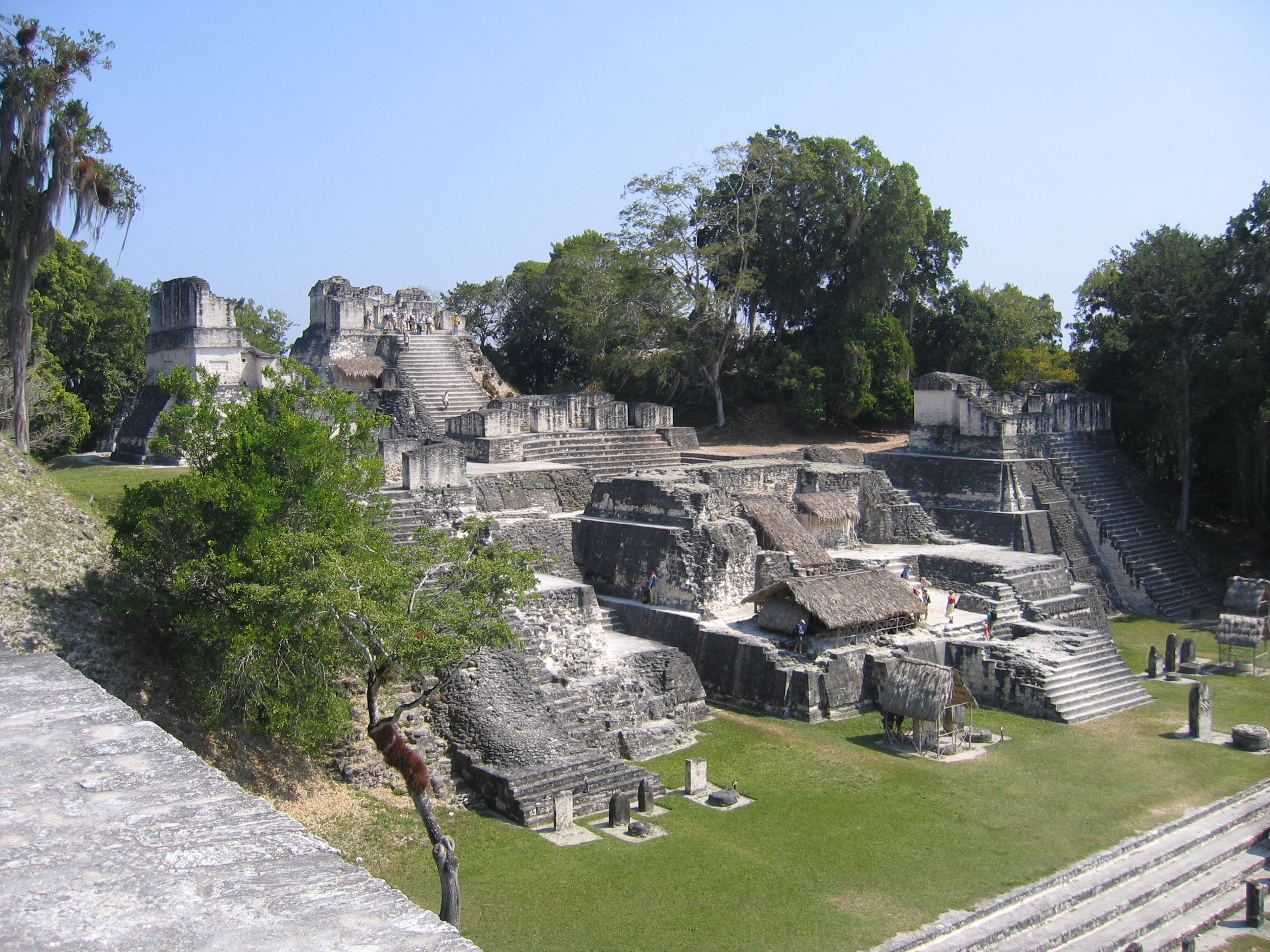
The North Acropolis

The Great Plaza lies at the core of the site; it is flanked on the east and west sides by two great temple-pyramids. On the north side it is bordered by the North Acropolis and on the south by the Central Acropolis.

The Central Acropolis is a palace complex just south of the Great Plaza.

The North Acropolis, together with the Great Plaza immediately to the south, is one of the most studied architectural groups in the Maya area; the Tikal Project excavated a massive trench across the complex, thoroughly investigating its construction history. It is a complex group with construction beginning in the Preclassic Period, around 350 BC. It developed into a funerary complex for the ruling dynasty of the Classic Period, with each additional royal burial adding new temples on top of the older structures. After AD 400 a row of tall pyramids was added to the earlier Northern Platform, which measured 100 by 80 meters (330 by 260 ft), gradually hiding it from view. Eight temple pyramids were built in the 6th century AD, each of them had an elaborate roofcomb and a stairway flanked by masks of the gods. By the 9th century AD, 43 stelae and 30 altars had been erected in the North Acropolis; 18 of these monuments were carved with hieroglyphic texts and royal portraits. The North Acropolis continued to receive burials into the Postclassic Period.

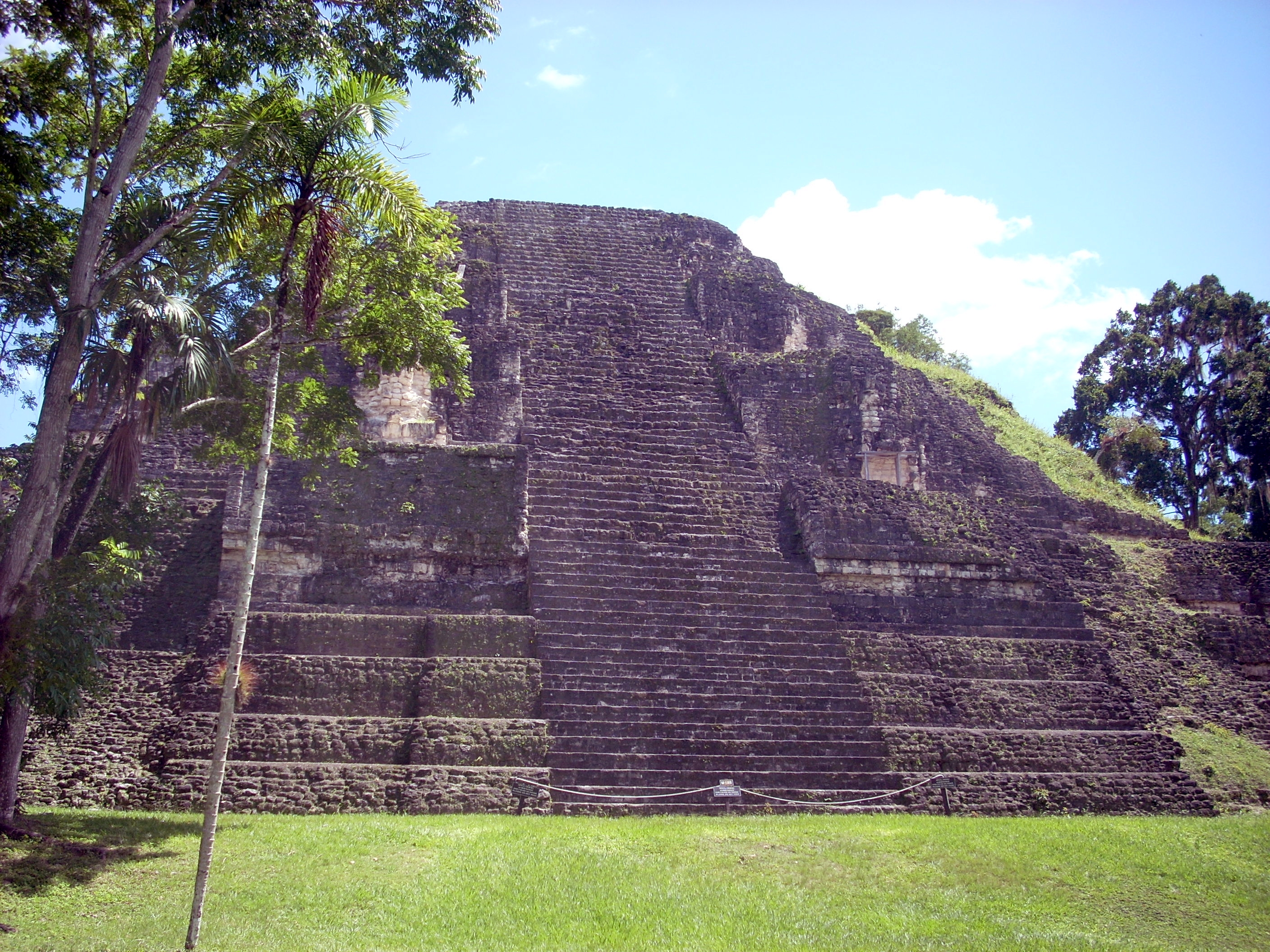
The Lost World Pyramid in the Mundo Perdido complex

The South Acropolis is found next to Temple V. It was built upon a large basal platform that covers an area of more than 20,000 square meters (220,000 sq ft).

The Plaza of the Seven Temples is to the west of the South Acropolis. It is bordered on the east side by a row of nearly identical temples, by palaces on the south and west sides and by an unusual triple ballcourt on the north side.

The Mundo Perdido is to the west of the Plaza of the Seven Temples. It is the largest ceremonial complex dating from the Preclassic period at Tikal. The complex was organized as a large E-Group consisting of a pyramid aligned with a platform to the east that supported three temples. The Mundo Perdido complex was rebuilt many times over the course of its history. By AD 250–300 its architectural style was influenced by the great metropolis of Teotihuacan in the Valley of Mexico, including the use of the talud-tablero form. During the Early Classic period (c. 250–600) the Mundo Perdido became one of the twin foci of the city, the other being the North Acropolis. From AD 250 to 378 it may have served as the royal necropolis. The Mundo Perdido complex was given its name by the archaeologists of the University of Pennsylvania; it is centered upon the Lost World Pyramid and a small platform to the west of it. To the south of Mundo Perdido, recent 2021 excavations have revealed a one-third size replication of La Ciudadela, or The Citadel, in Teotihuacan. This area may have been used as a diplomatic headquarters and as an effort to further stamp Teotihuacan culture upon the residents of Tikal.

Group G lies just south of the Mendez Causeway. The complex dates to the Late Classic and consists of palace-type structures and is one of the largest groups of its type at Tikal. It has two stories but most of the rooms are on the lower floor, a total of 29 vaulted chambers. The remains of two further chambers belong to the upper story. One of the entrances to the group was framed by a gigantic mask.

Group H is centered on a large plaza to the north of the Great Plaza. It is bordered by temples dating to the Late Classic.

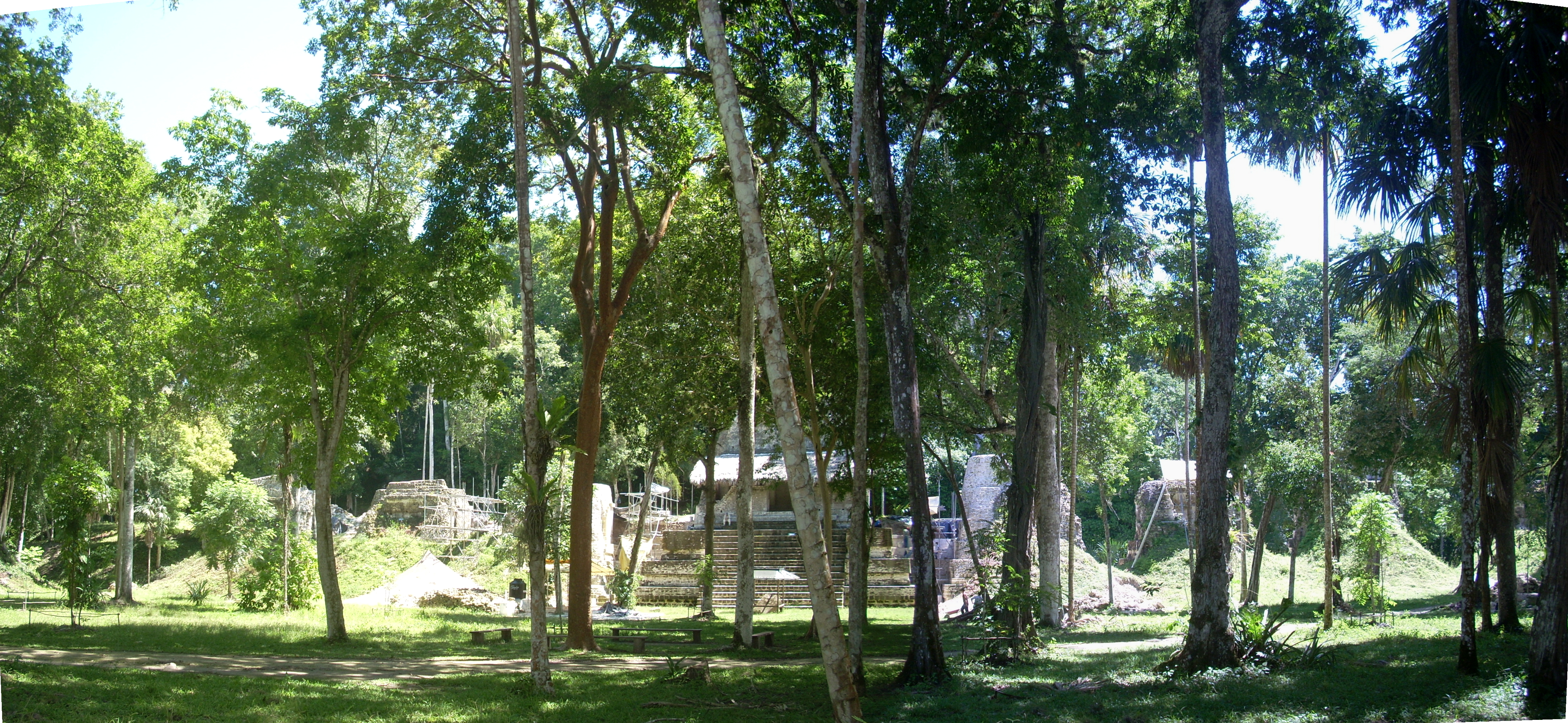
The Plaza of the Seven Temples

There are nine Twin-pyramid complexes at Tikal, one of which was completely dismantled in ancient times and some others were partly destroyed. They vary in size but consist of two pyramids facing each other on an east–west axis. These pyramids are flat-topped and have stairways on all four sides. A row of plain stelae is placed immediately to the west of the eastern pyramid and to the north of the pyramids. Lying roughly equidistant from them, there is usually a sculpted stela and altar pair. On the south side of these complexes there is a long vaulted building containing a single room with nine doorways. The entire complex was built at once and these complexes were built at 20-year (or k'atun) intervals during the Late Classic. The first twin-pyramid complex was built in the early 6th century in the East Plaza. It was once thought that these complexes were unique to Tikal but rare examples have now been found at other sites, such as Yaxha and Ixlu, and they may reflect the extent of Tikal's political dominance in the Late Classic.

Group Q is a twin-pyramid complex, and is one of the largest at Tikal. It was built by Yax Nuun Ayiin II in 771 in order to mark the end of the 17th K'atun. Most of it has been restored and its monuments have been re-erected.

Group R is another twin-pyramid complex, dated to 790. It is close to the Maler Causeway.

=== Structures ===
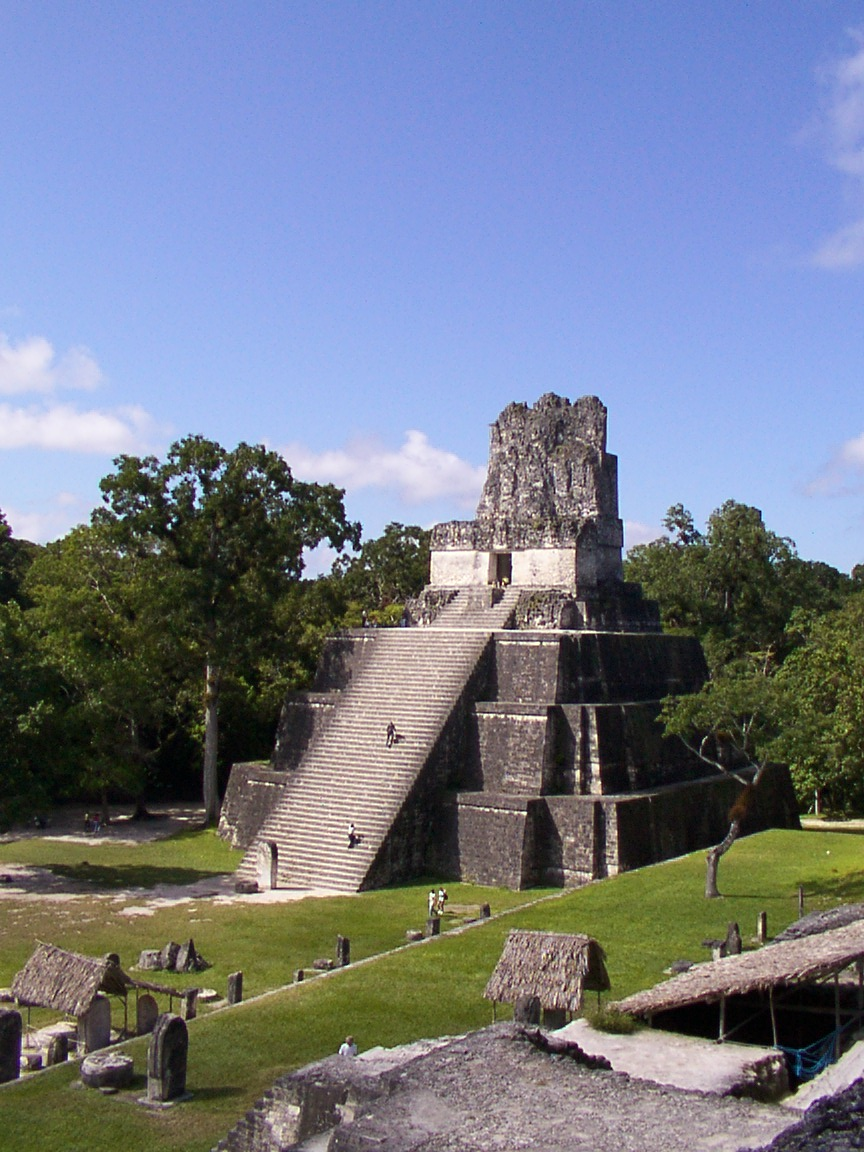
Temple II on the main plaza

There are thousands of ancient structures at Tikal and only a fraction of these have been excavated, after decades of archaeological work. The most prominent surviving buildings include six very large pyramids, labelled Temples I – VI, each of which support a temple structure on their summits. Some of these pyramids are over 60 meters (200 feet) high. They were numbered sequentially during the early survey of the site. It is estimated that each of these major temples could have been built in as little as two years.

Temple I (also known as the Temple of Ah Cacao or Temple of the Great Jaguar) is a funerary pyramid dedicated to Jasaw Chan Kʼawil, who was entombed in the structure in AD 734, the pyramid was completed around 740–750. The temple rises 47 meters (154 ft) high. The massive roofcomb that topped the temple was originally decorated with a giant sculpture of the enthroned king, although little of this decoration survives. The tomb of the king was discovered by Aubrey Trik of the University of Pennsylvania in 1962. Among items recovered from the Late Classic tomb were a large collection of inscribed human and animal bone tubes and strips with sophisticated scenes depicting deities and people, finely carved and rubbed with vermilion, as well as jade and shell ornaments and ceramic vessels filled with offerings of food and drink. The shrine at the summit of the pyramid has three chambers, each behind the next, with the doorways spanned by wooden lintels fashioned from multiple beams. The outermost lintel is plain but the two inner lintels were carved, some of the beams were removed in the 19th century and their location is unknown, while others were taken to museums in Europe.

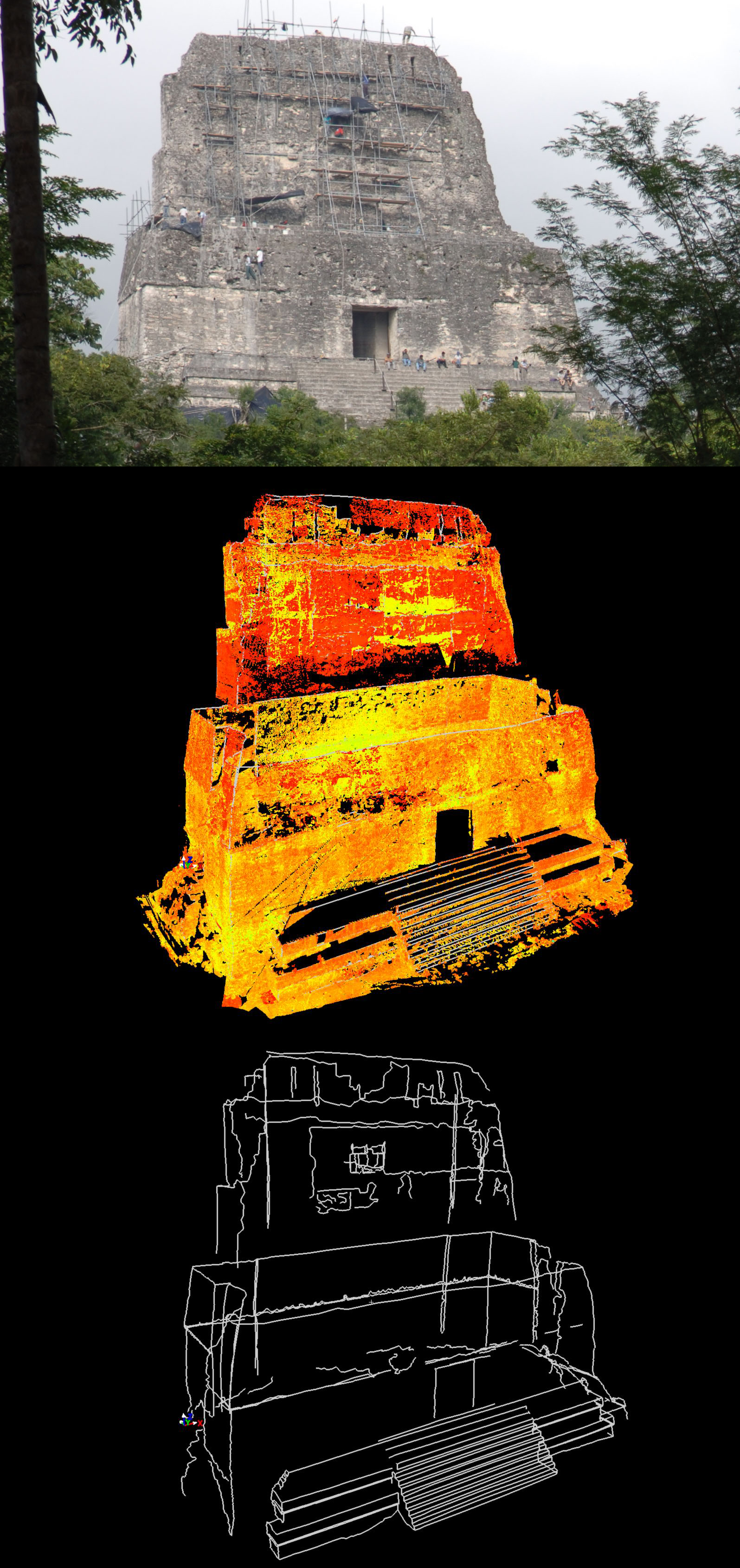
Contrasting photo, scan shot, and isometric images for the roof comb of Temple IV, using data acquired by a laser scan collected by nonprofit CyArk

Temple II (also known as the Temple of the Mask) it was built around AD 700 and stands 38 meters (125 ft) high. Like other major temples at Tikal, the summit shrine had three consecutive chambers with the doorways spanned by wooden lintels, only the middle of which was carved. The temple was dedicated to the wife of Jasaw Chan Kʼawil, although no tomb was found. The queen's portrait was carved into the lintel spanning the doorway of the summit shrine. One of the beams from this lintel is now in the American Museum of Natural History in New York City.

Temple III (also known as the Temple of the Jaguar Priest) was the last of the great pyramids to be built at Tikal. It stood 55 meters (180 ft) tall and contained an elaborately sculpted but damaged roof lintel, possibly showing Dark Sun engaged in a ritual dance around AD 810. The temple shrine possesses two chambers.

Temple IV is the tallest temple-pyramid at Tikal, measuring 70 meters (230 ft) from the plaza floor level to the top of its roof comb. Temple IV marks the reign of Yikʼin Chan Kawil (Ruler B, the son of Ruler A or Jasaw Chan Kʼawiil I) and two carved wooden lintels over the doorway that leads into the temple on the pyramid's summit record a long count date (9.15.10.0.0) that corresponds to CE 741 (Sharer 1994:169). Temple IV is one of the largest pyramids built anywhere in the Maya region in the 8th century, and it stands as one of the tallest pre-Columbian structures in the Americas, only surpassed by the Great Pyramid of Toniná (75 meters) and La Danta pyramid of El Mirador (72 meters) while the Pyramid of the Sun at Teotihuacan may originally have been taller (71 meters).

Temple V stands south of the Central Acropolis and is the mortuary pyramid of an as yet unidentified ruler. The temple stands 57 meters (187 ft) high, making it the second tallest structure at Tikal – only Temple IV is taller. The temple has been dated to about AD 700, in the Late Classic period, via radiocarbon analysis and the dating of ceramics associated with the structure places its construction during the reign of Nun Bak Chak in the second half of the 7th century.

Temple VI is also known as the Temple of the Inscriptions and was dedicated in AD 766. It is notable for its 12-meter (39 ft) high roof-comb. Panels of hieroglyphs cover the back and sides of the roof-comb. The temple faces onto a plaza to the west and its front is unrestored.

Temple 33 was a funerary pyramid erected over the tomb of Siyaj Chan Kʼawiil I (known as Burial 48) in the North Acropolis. It started life in the Early Classic as a wide basal platform decorated with large stucco masks that flanked the stairway. Later in the Early Classic a new superstructure was added, with its own masks and decorated panels. During the Hiatus a third stage was built over the earlier constructions, the stairway was demolished and another royal burial, of an unidentified ruler, was set into the structure (Burial 23). While the new pyramid was being built another high ranking tomb (Burial 24) was inserted into the rubble core of the building. The pyramid was then completed, standing 33 meters (108 ft) tall. The final version of Temple 33 was completely dismantled by archaeologists in 1965 in order to arrive at the earlier stages of construction.

Structure 34 is a pyramid in the North Acropolis that was built by Siyaj Chan K'awiil II over the tomb of his father, Yax Nuun Ayiin I. The pyramid was topped by a three chambered shrine, the rooms situated one behind the other.

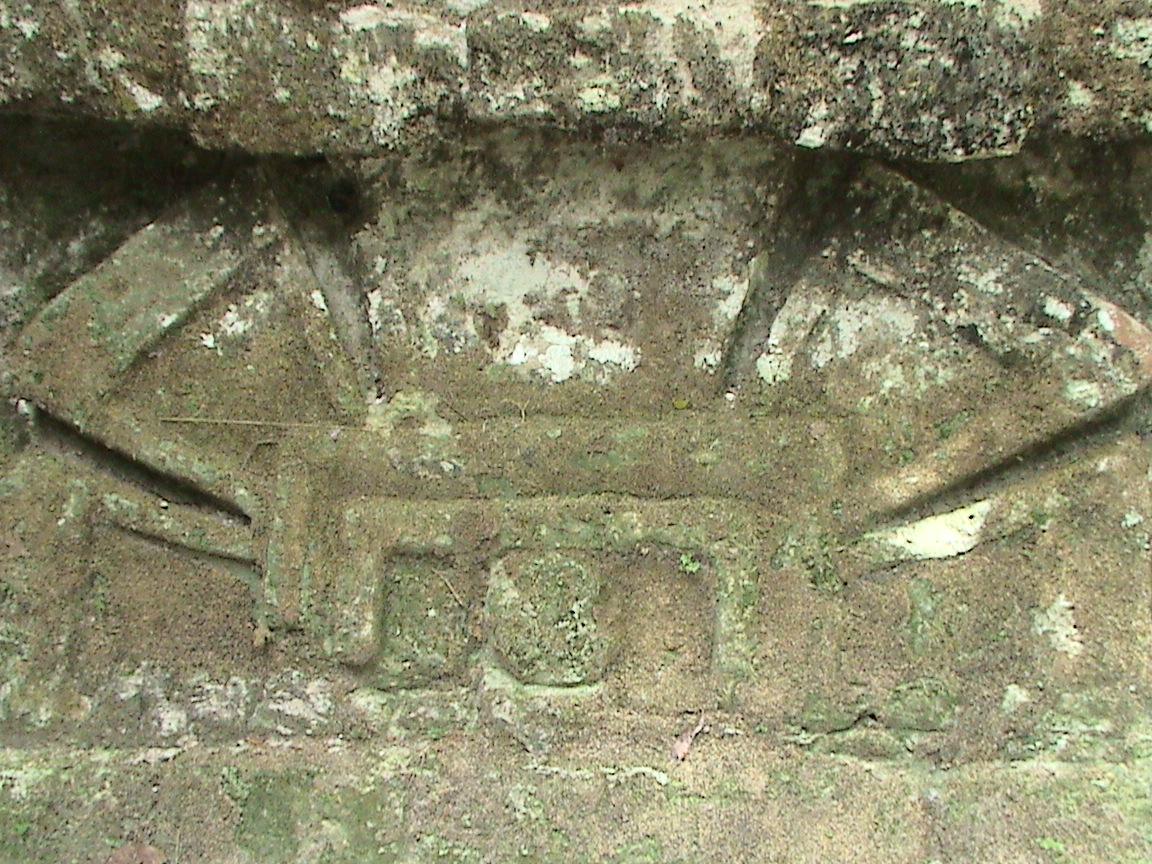
Detail of Teotihuacan-related imagery decorating the sloping talud sections of the talud-tablero sides of Structure 5D-43

Structure 5D-43 is an unusual radial temple in the East Plaza, built over a pre-existing twin-pyramid complex. It is built into the end of the East Plaza Ballcourt and possessed four entry doorways and three stairways, the fourth (south) side was too close to the Central Acropolis for a stairway on that side. The building has a talud-tablero platform profile, modified from the original style found at Teotihuacan. In fact, it has been suggested that the style of the building has closer affinities with El Tajín and Xochicalco than with Teotihuacan itself. The vertical tablero panels are set between sloping talud panels and are decorated with paired disc symbols. Large flower symbols are set into the sloping talud panels, related to the Venus and star symbols used at Teotihuacan. The roof of the structure was decorated with friezes although only fragments now remain, showing a monstrous face, perhaps that of a jaguar, with another head emerging from the mouth. The second head possesses a bifurcated tongue but is probably not that of a snake. The temple, and its associated ballcourt, probably date to the reign of Nuun Ujol Chaak or that Jasaw Chan Kʼawiil I, in the later part of the 7th century.

Structure 5C-49 possesses a clear Teotihuacan-linked architectural style; it has balustrades, an architectural feature that is very rare in the Maya region, and a talud-tablero façade; it dates to the 4th century AD. It is located near to the Lost World pyramid.

Structure 5C-53 is a small Teotihuacan-style platform that dates to about AD 600. It had stairways on all four sides and did not possess a superstructure.

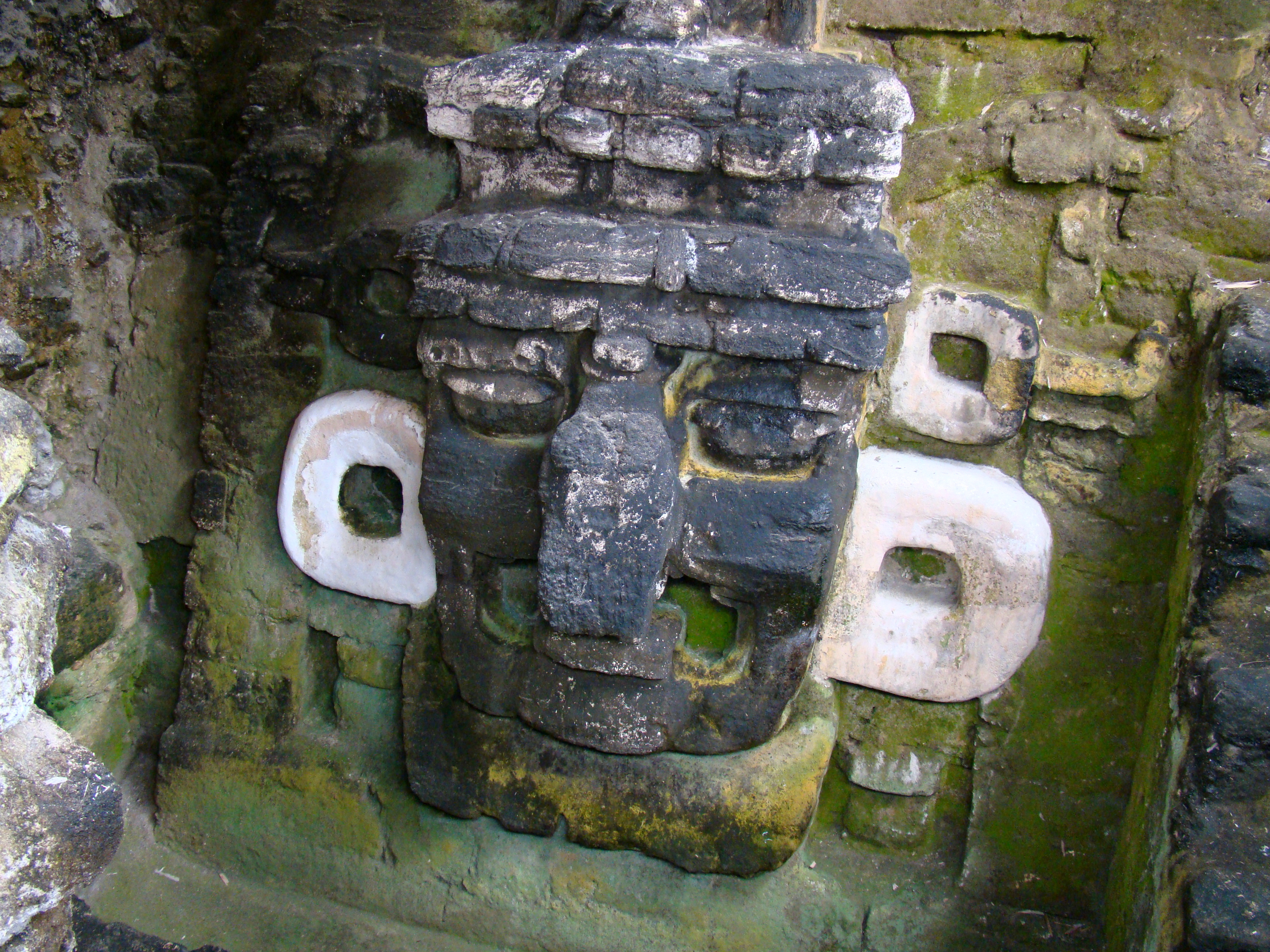
A large stucco mask adorning the substructure of Temple 33

The Lost World Pyramid (Structure 5C-54) is the largest structure in the Mundo Perdido complex. It lies in the southwest portion of Tikal's central core, south of Temple III and west of Temple V. It was decorated with stucco masks of the sun god and dates to the Late Preclassic; this pyramid is part of an enclosed complex of structures that remained intact and un-impacted by later building activity at Tikal. By the end of the Late Preclassic this pyramid was one of the largest structures in the Maya region. It attained its final form during the reign of Chak Tok Ichʼaak in the 4th century AD, in the Early Classic, standing more than 30 meters (98 ft) high with stairways on all four sides and a flat top that possibly supported a superstructure built from perishable materials. Although the plaza later suffered significant alteration, the organization of a group of temples on the east side of this complex adheres to the layout that defines the so-called E-Groups, identified as solar observatories.

Structure 5D-96 is the central temple on the east side of the Plaza of the Seven Temples. It has been restored and its rear outer wall is decorated with skull-and-crossbones motifs.

Group 6C-16 is an elite residential complex that has been thoroughly excavated. It lies a few hundred m south of the Lost World Complex and the excavations have revealed elaborate stucco masks, ballplayer murals, relief sculptures and buildings with Teotihuacan characteristics.

The Great Plaza Ballcourt is a small ballcourt that lies between Temple I and the Central Acropolis.

The Bat Palace is also known as the Palace of Windows and lies to the west of Temple III. It has two storeys, with a double range of chambers on the lower storey and a single range in the upper storey, which has been restored. The palace has ancient graffiti and possesses low windows.

Complex N lies to the west of the Bat Palace and Temple III. The complex dates to AD 711.

In 2018, 60,000 uncharted structures were revealed by archaeologists with help of Lidar. Thanks to the new findings, some archaeologists believe that 7–11 million Maya people inhabited in the northern Guatemala during the late classical period from 650 to 800 A.D. Lidar digitally removed the tree canopy to reveal ancient remains and showed that Maya cities like Tikal were bigger than previously thought. The project was mapped near the Maya Biosphere Reserve in the Petén region of Guatemala.

=== Altars ===
Altar 5 is carved with two nobles, one of whom is probably Jasaw Chan Kʼawiil I. They are performing a ritual using the bones of an important woman. Altar 5 was found in Complex N, which lies to the west of Temple III.

Altar 8 is sculpted with a bound captive. It was found within Complex P in Group H and is now in the Museo Nacional de Arqueología y Etnología in Guatemala City.

Altar 9 is associated with Stela 21 and bears the sculpture of a bound captive. It is located in front of Temple VI.

Altar 10 is carved with a captive tied to a scaffold. It is in the northern enclosure of Group Q, a twin-pyramid complex and has suffered from erosion.

Altar 35 is a plain monument associated with Stela 43. The stela-altar pair is centrally located at the base of the stairway of Temple IV.

=== Lintels ===
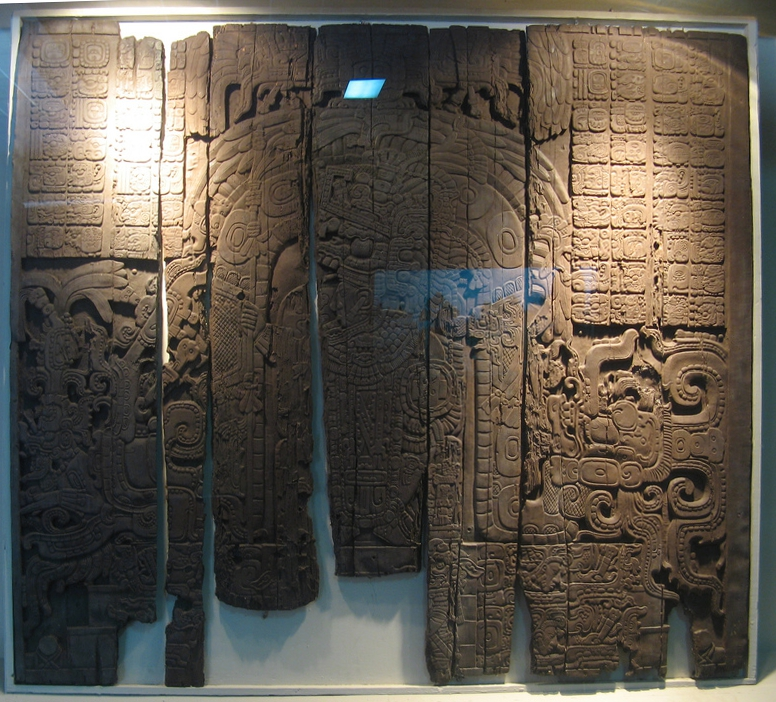
The elaborately carved wooden Lintel 3 from Temple IV. It celebrates a military victory by Yikʼin Chan Kʼawiil in 743.

At Tikal, beams of sapodilla wood were placed as lintels spanning the inner doorways of temples. These are the most elaborately carved wooden lintels to have survived anywhere in the Maya region.

Lintel 3 from Temple IV was taken to Basel in Switzerland in the 19th century. It was in almost perfect condition and depicts Yikʼin Chan Kʼawiil seated on a palanquin.

=== Stelae ===
Stelae are carved stone shafts, often sculpted with figures and hieroglyphs. A selection of the most notable stelae at Tikal follows:

Stela 1 dates to the 5th century and depicts the king Siyaj Chan Kʼawiil II in a standing position.

Stela 4 is dated to AD 396, during the reign of Yax Nuun Ayiin after the intrusion of Teotihuacan in the Maya area. The stela displays a mix of Maya and Teotihuacan qualities, and deities from both cultures. It has a portrait of the king with the Underworld Jaguar God under one arm and the Mexican Tláloc under the other. His helmet is a simplified version of the Teotihuacan War Serpent. Unusually for Maya sculpture, but typically for Teotihuacan, Yax Nuun Ayiin is depicted with a frontal face, rather than in profile.

Stela 5 was dedicated in 744 by Yikʼin Chan Kʼawiil.

Stela 6 is a badly damaged monument dating to 514 and bears the name of the "Lady of Tikal" who celebrated the end of the 4th Kʼatun in that year.

Stela 10 is twinned with Stela 12 but is badly damaged. It described the accession of Kaloomteʼ Bʼalam in the early 6th century and earlier events in his career, including the capture of a prisoner depicted on the monument.

Stela 11 was the last monument ever erected at Tikal; it was dedicated in 869 by Jasaw Chan Kʼawiil II.

Stela 12 is linked to the queen known as the "Lady of Tikal" and king Kaloomteʼ Bʼalam. The queen is described as performing the year-ending rituals but the monument was dedicated in honor of the king.

Stela 16 was dedicated in 711, during the reign of Jasaw Chan Kʼawiil I. The sculpture, including a portrait of the king and a hieroglyphic text, are limited to the front face of the monument. It was found in Complex N, west of Temple III.

Stela 18 was one of two stelae erected by Yax Nuun Ayiin I to celebrate the kʼatun-ending of AD 396. It was re-erected at the base of Temple 34, his funerary shrine.

Stela 19 was dedicated in 790 by Yax Nuun Ayiin II.

Stela 20 was found in Complex P, in Group H, and was moved to the Museo Nacional de Arqueología y Etnología in Guatemala City.

Stela 21 was dedicated in 736 by Yikʼin Chan Kʼawiil. Only the bottom of the stela is intact, the rest having been mutilated in ancient times. The surviving sculpture is of fine quality, consisting of the feet of a figure and of accompanying hieroglyphic text. The stela is associated with Altar 9 and is located in front of Temple VI.

Stela 22 was dedicated in 771 by Yax Nuun Ahiin II in the northern enclosure of Group Q, a twin-pyramid complex. The face of the figure on the stela has been mutilated.

Stela 23 was broken in antiquity and was re-erected in a residential complex. The defaced portrait on the monument is that of the so-called "Lady of Tikal", a daughter of Chak Tok Ichʼaak II who became queen at the age of six but never ruled in her own right, being paired with male co-rulers. It dates to the early 6th century.

Stela 24 was erected at the foot of Temple 3 in 810, accompanied by Altar 7. Both were broken into fragments in ancient times, although the name of Dark Sun survives on three fragments.

Stela 26 was found in the summit shrine of Temple 34, underneath a broken masonry altar. The monument had originally been erected at the base of the temple during the Early Classic period and was later broken, probably at the beginning of the Late Classic. Its remains were then interred within the temple shrine.

Stela 29 bears a Long Count (8.12.14.8.15) date equivalent to AD 292, the earliest surviving Long Count date from the Maya lowlands. The stela is also the earliest monument to bear the Tikal emblem glyph. It bears a sculpture of the king facing to the right, holding the head of an underworld jaguar god, one of the patron deities of the city. The stela was deliberately smashed during the 6th century or some time later, the upper portion was dragged away and dumped in a rubbish tip close to Temple III, to be uncovered by archaeologists in 1959.

Stela 30 is the first surviving monument to be erected after the Hiatus. Its style and iconography is similar to that of Caracol, one of the more important of Tikal's enemies.

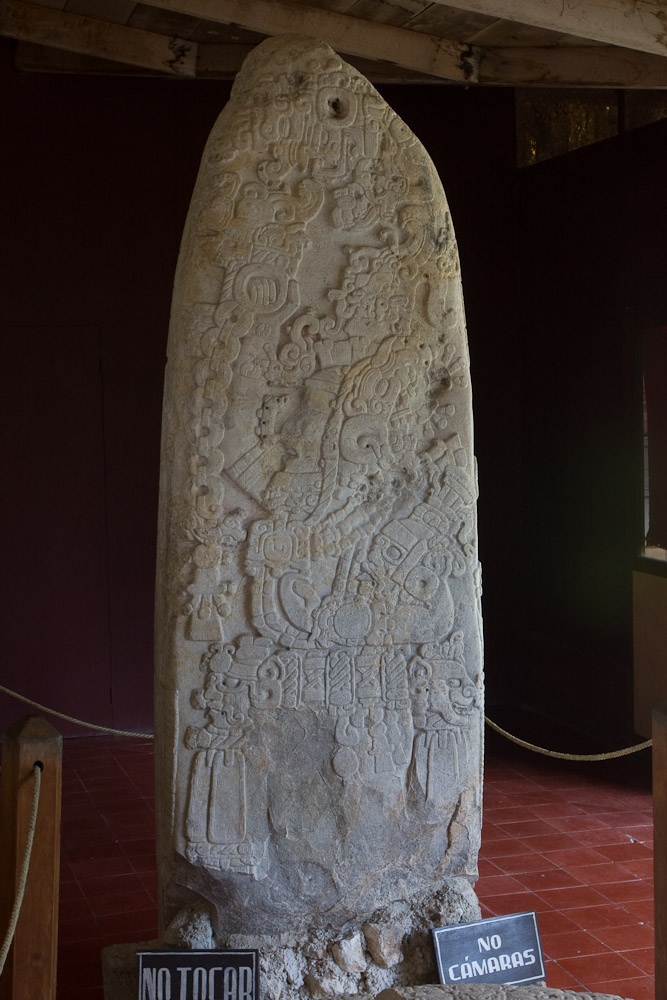
Stela 31, with the sculpted image of Siyaj Chan Kʼawiil II

Stela 31 is the accession monument of Siyaj Chan K'awiil II, also bearing two portraits of his father, Yax Nuun Ayiin, as a youth dressed as a Teotihuacan warrior. He carries a spearthrower in one hand and bears a shield decorated with the face of Tláloc, the Teotihuacan war god. In ancient times the sculpture was broken and the upper portion was moved to the summit of Temple 33 and ritually buried. Stela 31 has been described as the greatest Early Classic sculpture to survive at Tikal. A long hieroglyphic text is carved onto the back of the monument, the longest to survive from the Early Classic, which describes the arrival of Siyah Kʼakʼ at El Peru and Tikal in January 378. It was also the first stela at Tikal to be carved on all four faces.

Stela 32 is a fragmented monument with a foreign Teotihuacan-style sculpture apparently depicting the lord of that city with the attributes of the central Mexican storm god Tláloc, including his goggle eyes and tasselled headdress.

Stela 39 is a broken monument that was erected in the Lost World complex. The upper portion of the stela is missing but the lower portion shows the lower body and legs of Chak Tok Ichʼaak, holding a flint axe in his left hand. He is trampling the figure of a bound, richly dressed captive. The monument is dated to AD 376. The text on the back of the monument describes a bloodletting ritual to celebrate a Kʼatun-ending. The stela also names Chak Tok Ichʼaak I's father as Kʼinich Muwaan Jol.

Stela 40 bears a portrait of Kan Chitam and dates to AD 468.

Stela 43 is paired with Altar 35. It is a plain monument at the base of the stairway of Temple IV.

=== Burials ===
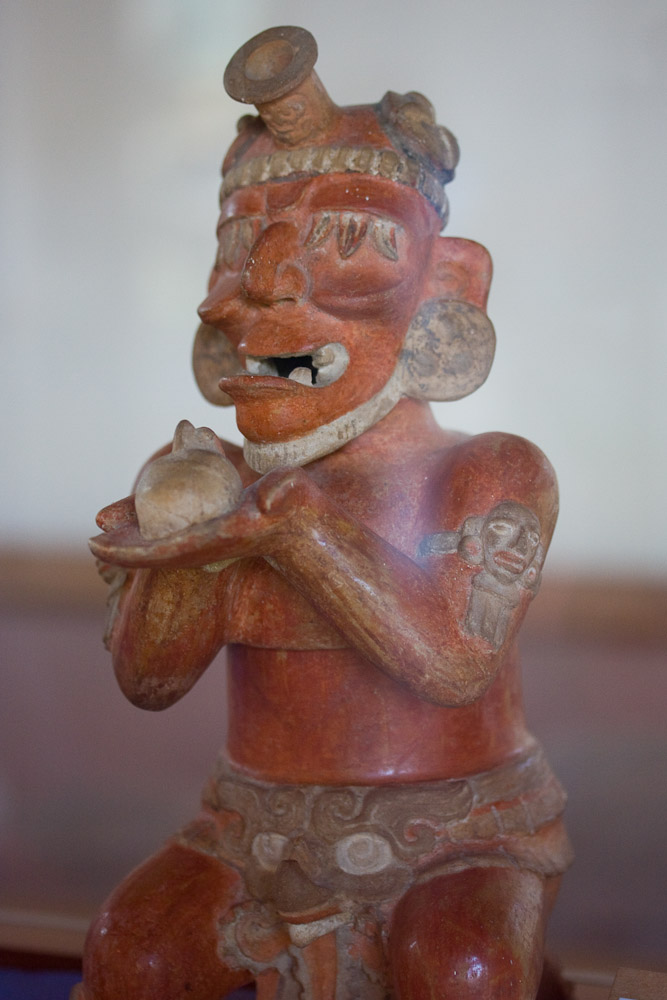
A ceramic censer representing an elderly deity, found in Burial 10

Burial 1 is a tomb in the Lost World complex. A fine ceramic bowl was recovered from the tomb, with the handle formed from three-dimensional head and neck of a bird emerging from the two-dimensional body painted on the lid.

Burial 10 is the tomb of Yax Nuun Ahiin I. It is located beneath Structure 34 in the North Acropolis. The tomb contained a rich array of offerings, including ceramic vessels and food, and nine youths were sacrificed to accompany the dead king. A dog was also entombed with the deceased king. Pots in the tomb were stuccoed and painted and many demonstrated a blend of Maya and Teotihuacan styles. Among the offerings was an incense-burner in the shape of an elderly underworld god, sitting on a stool made of human bones and holding a severed head in his hands. The tomb was sealed with a corbel vault, then the pyramid was built on top.

Burial 48 is generally accepted as the tomb of Sihyaj Chan Kʼawiil II. It is located beneath Temple 33 in the North Acropolis. The chamber of the tomb was cut from the bedrock and contained the remains of the king himself together with those of two adolescents who had been sacrificed in order to accompany the deceased ruler. The walls of the tomb were covered with white stucco painted with hieroglyphs that included the Long Count date equivalent to 20 March 457, probably the date of either the death or interment of the king. The king's skeleton was missing its skull, its femurs and one of its hands while the skeletons of the sacrificial victims were intact.

Burial 85 dates to the Late Preclassic and was enclosed by a platform, with a primitive corbel vault. The tomb contained a single male skeleton, which lacked a skull and its thighbones. The dynastic founder of Tikal, Yax Ehb Xook, has been linked to this tomb, which lies deep in the heart of the North Acropolis. The deceased had probably died in battle with his body being mutilated by his enemies before being recovered and interred by his followers. The bones were wrapped carefully in textiles to form an upright bundle. The missing head was replaced by a small greenstone mask with shell-inlaid teeth and eyes and bearing a three-pointed royal headband. This head wears an emblem of rulership on its forehead and is a rare Preclassic lowland Maya portrait of a king. Among the contents of the tomb were a stingray spine, a spondylus shell and twenty-six ceramic vessels.

Burial 116 is the tomb of Jasaw Chan Kʼawiil I. It is a large vaulted chamber deep within the pyramid, below the level of the Great Plaza. The tomb contained rich offerings of jadeite, ceramics, shell and works of art. The body of the king was covered with large quantities of jade ornaments including an enormous necklace with especially large beads, as depicted in sculpted portraits of the king. One of the outstanding pieces recovered from the tomb was an ornate jade mosaic vessel with the lid bearing a sculpted portrait of the king himself.

Burial 195 was flooded with mud in antiquity. This flood had covered wooden objects that had completely rotted away by the time the tomb was excavated, leaving hollows in the dried mud. Archaeologists filled these hollows with stucco and thus excavated four effigies of the god Kʼawiil, the wooden originals long gone.

Burial 196 is a Late Classic royal tomb that contained a jade mosaic vessel topped with the head of the Maize God.

== Ecology ==
Tikal National Park makes up part of the global Man and the Biosphere Programme, within the Maya Biosphere Reserve. Because of its lush and varied ecosystem, many species of plants and animals thrive within the park boundaries. Five species of cats reside within the park, including the jaguar and puma, along with several species of monkeys and anteaters. In addition, more than 300 species of birds are found in the park, including the crane hawk and the ocellated turkey.

== See also ==
- El Zotz
- List of Mesoamerican pyramids
