= Plaza of the Seven Temples =

Archaeological site in Guatemala

Coordinates: 17°13′10.67″N 89°37′32.79″W

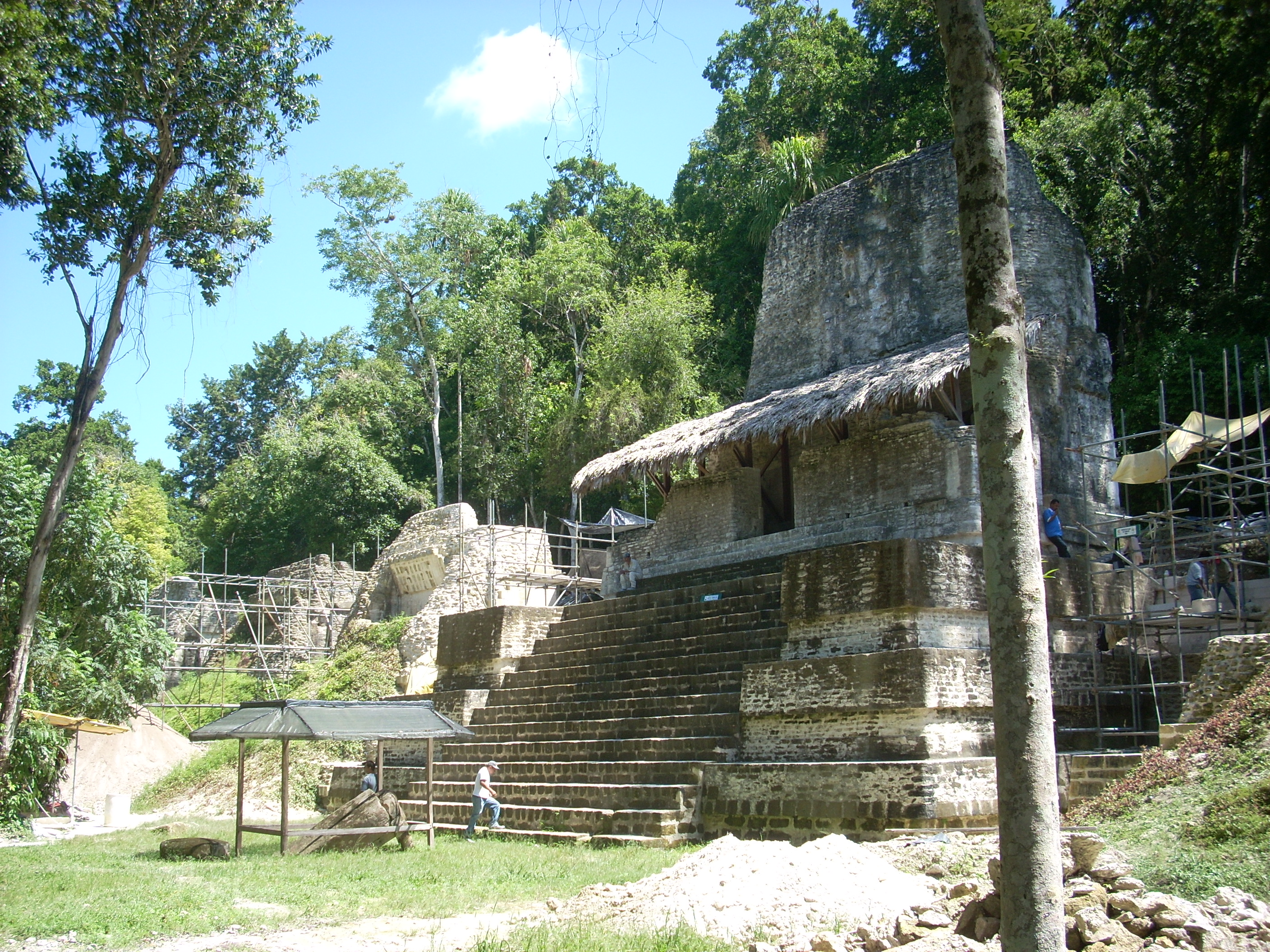
Structure 5D-96, the largest of the seven temples

The Plaza of the Seven Temples (or Plaza de los Siete Templos in Spanish) is an architectural complex in the ruins of the Maya city of Tikal, in the Petén Department of northern Guatemala. It is to the south of Temple III and to the west of the South Acropolis; it is 300 metres (980 ft) to the southwest of the Great Plaza. The Plaza of the Seven Temples is situated directly to the east of the Mundo Perdido ("Lost World") Complex and takes its name from a row of seven small temples dating to the Late Classic Period (600–900 AD). The plaza has a surface area of approximately 25,000 square metres (270,000 sq ft), making it one of the three largest plazas in the city.

== History ==
=== Preclassic ===
Two deposits of Middle Preclassic ceramic fragments were excavated in the southwest portion of the plaza. Each deposit consisted of thousands of fragments that had been placed in hollows carved in the limestone bedrock below the plaza. These are the earliest traces of human activity that have been found in the plaza and they have been dated to around 650 BC. These early ceramic deposits were not associated with any kind of construction activity.

The earliest traces of construction in the area of the Plaza of the Seven Temples consist of the first version of the E-Group temple complex facing onto the Lost World Plaza. This phase of construction has been dated to between 650 and 550 BC. The earliest evidence of occupation of the plaza itself dates to the Late Preclassic between 400 and 200 BC, and is related to the cap of black earth immediately overlying the bedrock, with archaeological materials being accidentally introduced by the first inhabitants. The first structure to be built in the plaza dates to about this time, when a small circular platform was erected upon the thin stucco floor that was the first formal levelling of the plaza. This platform stood 12 centimetres (4.7 in) high and measured 4 metres (13 ft) across. The remains of this building were found 0.75 metres (2.5 ft) under the surface of the central patio, in front of Temple 5D-95. Ash was found upon the southern part of the platform and it is believed that the structure was either an early residence or an altar.

In the Late Preclassic from 200 BC to 200 AD there was still no formal floor covering the entire Plaza of the Seven Temples area, with flooring being laid around those buildings that existed at the time, such as Structure 5D-91 to the south and the E-Group to the west of the plaza, and around the South Acropolis to the east of the plaza, extending into the East Patio. Around this time the fourth version of the E-Group was built, which included the three rooms on its east platform that front onto the Plaza of the Seven Temples. The central portion of the Plaza of the Seven Temples was not surfaced at this time, in fact the Plaza did not exist as a formal space but occupied an important open area lying between the South Acropolis to the east and the Lost World Complex to the west.

=== Early Classic ===
Plentiful Early Classic ceramic fragments indicate that in all likelihood major construction activity took place in the Plaza during the Early Classic, although this has not yet been directly identified archaeologically.

=== Late Classic ===
The second and final version of the Plaza of the Seven Temples has been dated to the Late Classic Period (approximately 600 to 900 AD). Structures 5D-90 and 5D-91, the westernmost and central buildings of the south range, were built at this time.

=== Terminal Classic ===
A large quantity of Terminal Classic remains have been found concentrated around Structure 5D-90, demonstrating that the Plaza of the Seven Temples was in use right up until the time the city was abandoned. The southern range was refurbished at this time.

=== Modern history ===
The plaza was investigated by Patrick Culbert of the University of Pennsylvania in 1963, concentrating on the plaza's stratigraphy and also clearing the palace on the southern side. Major excavations of the plaza started in January 1983 under Vilma Fialko, with the objective of consolidating the seven temples on the east side of the plaza, and palace structure 5D-92 on the southeast corner.

In 2004 the Ministerio de Cultura y Deportes ("Ministry of Culture and Sports") of Guatemala and the Agencia Española de Cooperación Internacional ("Spanish Agency for International Cooperation") launched a joint project to investigate the plaza and restore its buildings. The project had fifty workers at its disposal and the programme of investigations began with stratigraphic excavations in 2004, followed by excavation of the southern range in 2005. In 2006 the seven temples themselves were excavated and the project excavated the triple ballcourt in 2007.

== Layout ==
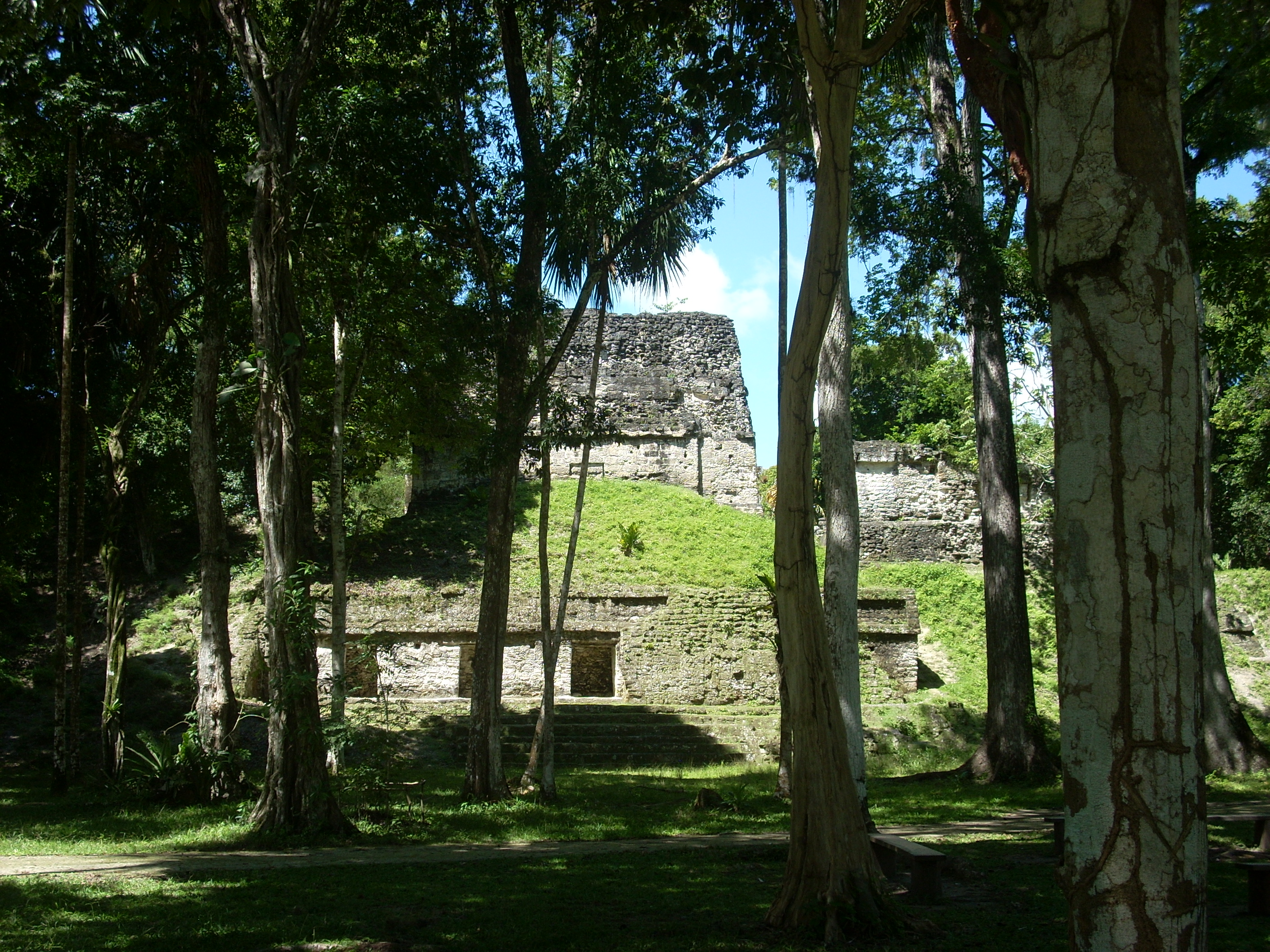
West side of the plaza

The main axis of the Plaza appears to originally have run north-south from the central ballcourt on the north side through to the palace structure 5D-91 on the south side. The flanking structures 5D-90 and 5D-92 were then built as annexes on the south side of the plaza, at the same time as the east and west ballcourts were added on the north side. The seven temples themselves appear to have been a later development, taking advantage of the adjoining west terrace of the South Acropolis. Archaeologists have divided the Plaza of the Seven Temples into a number of zones:

The Central Patio is the inner courtyard of the plaza, enclosed by the surrounding buildings. It has a surface area of 8,000 square metres (86,000 sq ft) and inclined slightly so as to drain runoff rainwater from the northeast corner, towards the Temple III reservoir. The seven temples are aligned along the east side of the patio. It is bordered on the south by a palace complex. On the north side it is enclosed by a number of structures that formed a triple ballcourt. The west side of the Central Patio is formed by the rear of an E-Group complex.

The North Patio is the area immediately north of the triple ballcourt.

The East Patio is the area immediately behind the seven temples. It is actually the western terrace of the South Acropolis. One of the walls has been dated as far back as the Preclassic Period.

The South Patio is the zone to the south of the southern palace.

The west side of the plaza is enclosed by the remains of an E-Group complex facing westwards onto a neighbouring plaza.

== The seven temples ==
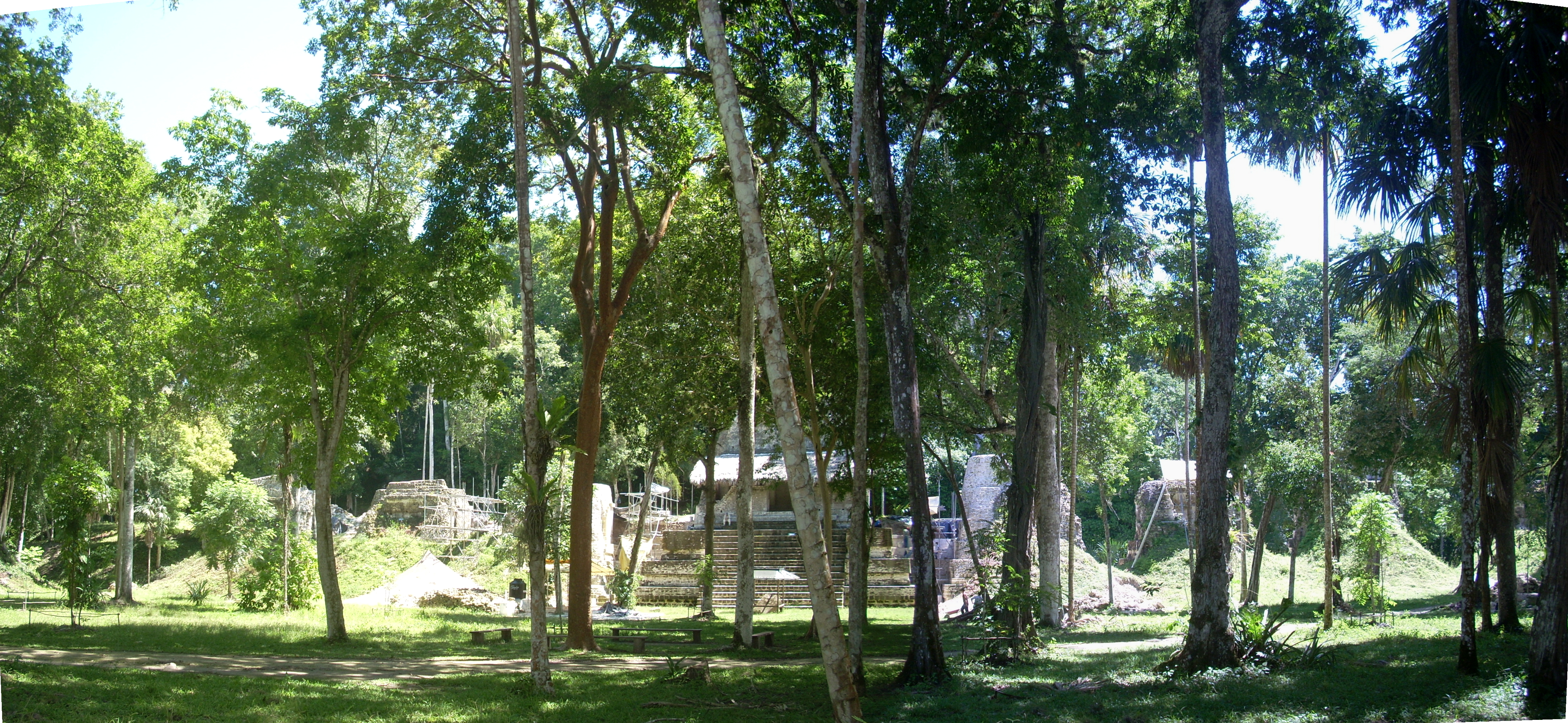
The line of seven temples on the east side of the plaza

The seven temples giving the plaza its name are aligned along the east side of the plaza. They are denominated Structures 5D-93 through to 5D-99.

Structure 5D-94 is the second temple from the southern end of the series. The temple consists of a single platform standing 2.3 metres (7.5 ft) high. The platform has an upper flange that projects 15 centimetres (5.9 in) from the platform wall.

Structure 5D-96 is the largest of the seven temples, standing 2.5 metres (8.2 ft) higher than the others. It the central temple of the seven; a plain stela-altar pair is situated in front of it. The temple is particularly notable for its relief sculpture, including a skull and crossed bones. The temple was cleared of overgrowth in 2004 in order to prevent further damage being caused to the temple superstructure, which had already suffered collapse of some sections of the roof comb due to the penetration of tree roots.

== Other structures ==
Structures 5D-90, 91 and 92 are three Late Classic palace structures standing on the south side of the plaza, these three structures were joined to form a single building.

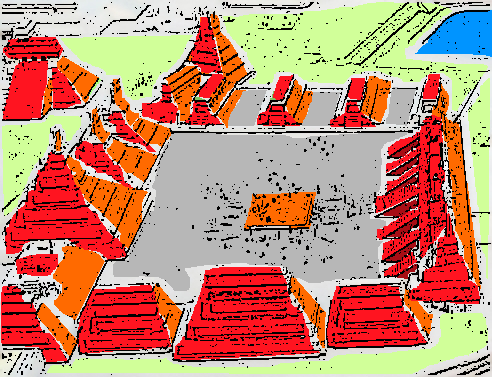
Reconstruction of the Plaza of the Seven Temples as it would have looked in the 8th century. View looking north.

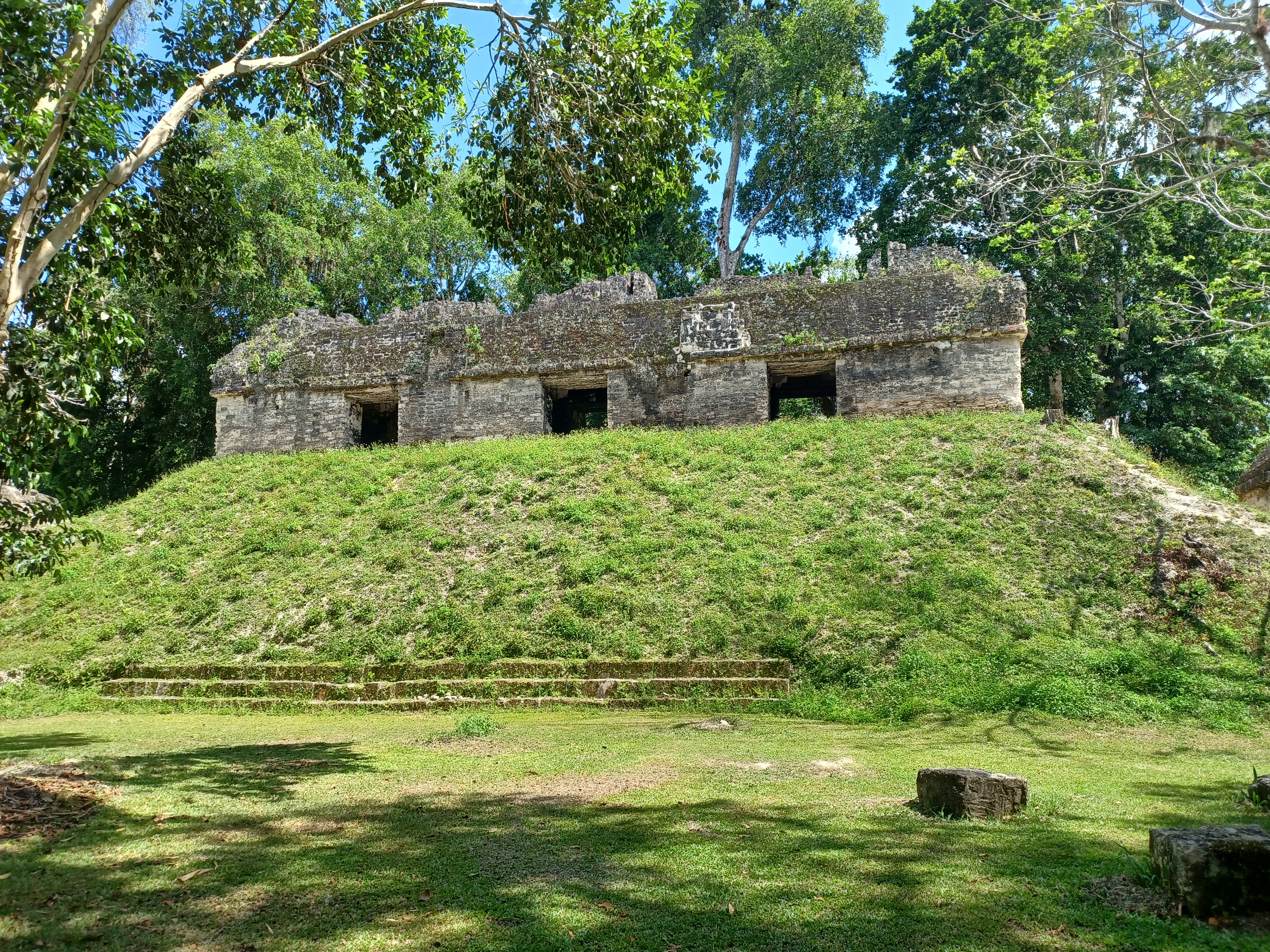
Structure 5D-91, a palace-type building on the south side of the plaza

Structure 5D-90, the westernmost, is rectangular with two small stepped platforms supporting the superstructure. It has 5 doorways in both its north and south facades. The north side of the building was accessed via a central stairway. The superstructure had terraces fronting its north and south sides, although the northern terrace was narrower than that on the south side. The facades of the structure are believed to have been decorated with friezes. The upper sections of the building have suffered extensive damage and fallen stones have been found decorated with wave-like sculpture, indicating that the building once supported either friezes or a decorated roof comb, although no trace of the latter now stands. Structure 5D-90 was built during the Late Classic and was reworked in the Terminal Classic. The building originally had two rooms, accessed respectively via the doors in the north and south facades and joined by a wide central doorway in the dividing wall. Due to its particular characteristics, in the Late Classic this building is believed to have served a civic administrative function rather than being used for domestic activity. In the Terminal Classic, the two rooms were subdivided to form five rooms with the construction of thin internal walls measuring approximately 20 to 30 centimetres (7.9 to 11.8 in) thick. One wall divided the former north chamber into two rooms, and two further walls divided the south chamber. Three of the rooms may have been used for residential purposes and the remaining two continued to serve an administrative function. At the same time a low platform was built upon the southern terrace, which may have supported a perishable structure. A large amount of archaeological remains were found scattered around the building upon its final floor level, including almost 23,000 ceramic fragments as well as pieces of bone, shell, greenstone, obsidian and flint.

Structure 5D-91, the central structure, is a twin facade structure facing both north and south. This building is the main section of the southern range and is the largest building in the whole Plaza of the Seven Temples. The structure consists of three parts, a stepped basal platform with five levels, the superstructure containing the building's rooms, and a roof comb. The structure was accessed via wide symmetrical stairways on both the northern and southern sides. It has been restored by archaeologists and possessed a long gallery that was later split into three rooms with the addition of 1-metre (3.3 ft) thick dividing walls. This structure has small sculpted anthropomorphic masks on each of its corners and possibly two further masks in the centre of the north and south sides, although very little remains of these. It possesses a small roof comb that is decorated with a further ten masks. The masks are still partly visible and show feather decorations and, in some cases, necklaces. The masks have stylistic similarities with sculpted monuments at the city. The roof comb was built from five small vaulted sections, each with a mask on both its north and south face. Structure 5D-91 had 6 doors, with three on the north side and three on the south. The three rooms had small doors linking them; and each room had a lower ceiling at each end, with a higher section in the middle. Structure 5D-91 has been dated to the Late Classic.

Structure 5D-92 is the easternmost structure and has 3 doors on its southern side.

The north side of the plaza is formed by Structures 5D-77 through to 5D-81, which may have formed a triple ballcourt.

== Monuments ==
The plaza has very few stone monuments. Stela 37 and Altar 31 are plain monuments that were placed in front of Structure 5D-96, the central of the seven temples.

== Burials ==
Burial 1 was excavated from the central area of the plaza. The remains had been interred on the east-west axis running through the centre of the adjacent Lost World Plaza E-Group backing onto the Seven Temples Plaza. Burial 1 has been tentatively dated to the Early Classic Period.

Burial 2 was interred in the south patio, aligned with the north-south axis running through the centre of the middle palace structure.

Burial 3 was interred near Burial 2, in the south patio.
