= E-Group =

Ancient Maya architectural complexes

E-Groups are unique architectural complexes found among a number of ancient Maya settlements. They are central components to the settlement organization of Maya sites and, like many other civic and ceremonial buildings, could have served for astronomical observations. These sites have been discovered in the Maya Lowlands and other regions of Mesoamerica and have been dated to Middle Preclassical to Terminal Classic Period.

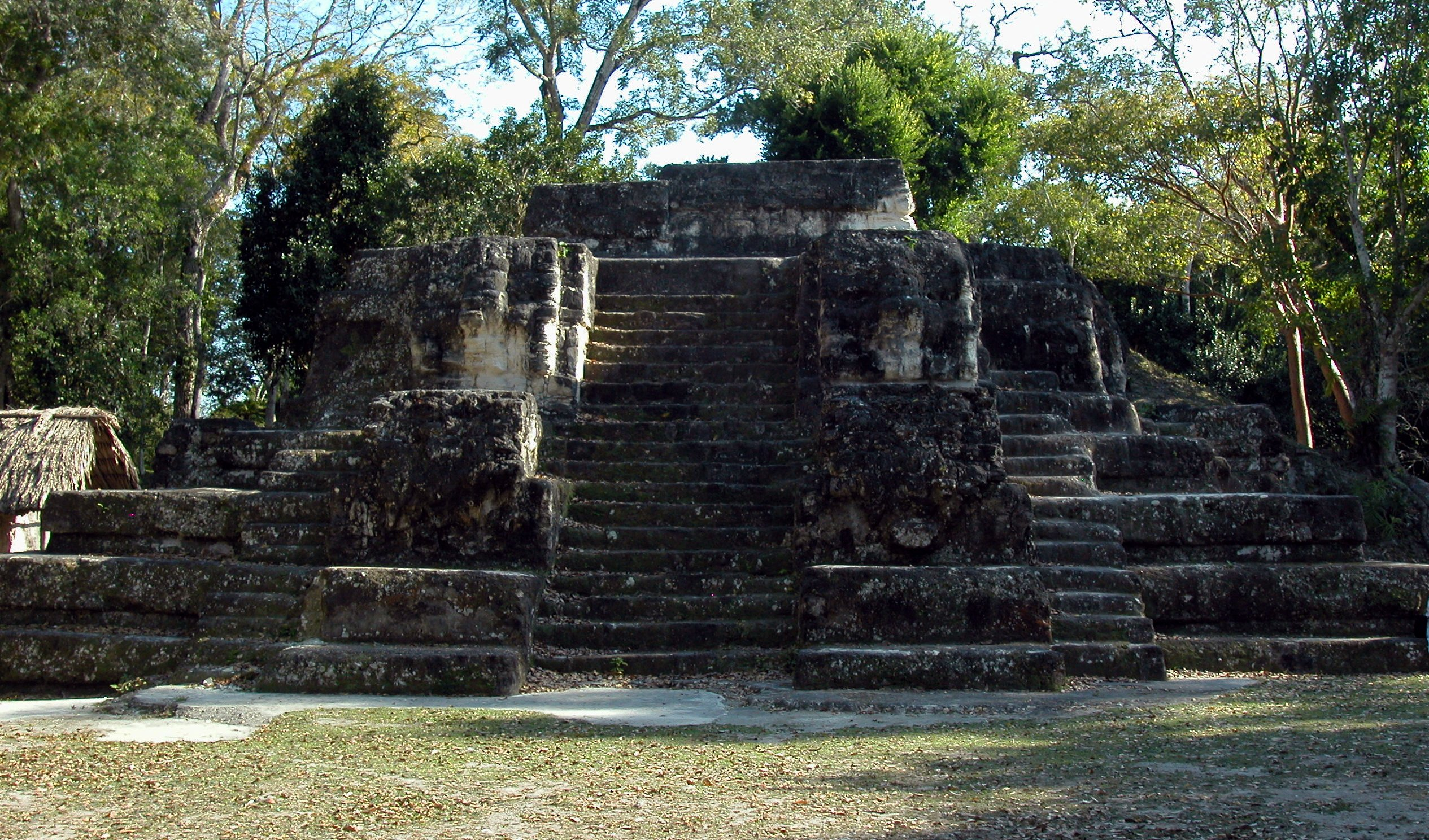
North Face of the Temple of Masks, E Group Uaxactun

It has been a common opinion that the alignments incorporated in these structural complexes correspond to the sun's solstices and equinoxes. Recent research has shown, however, that the orientations of these assemblages are highly variable, but pertain to alignment groups that are widespread in the Maya area and materialized mostly in other types of buildings, recording different agriculturally significant dates.

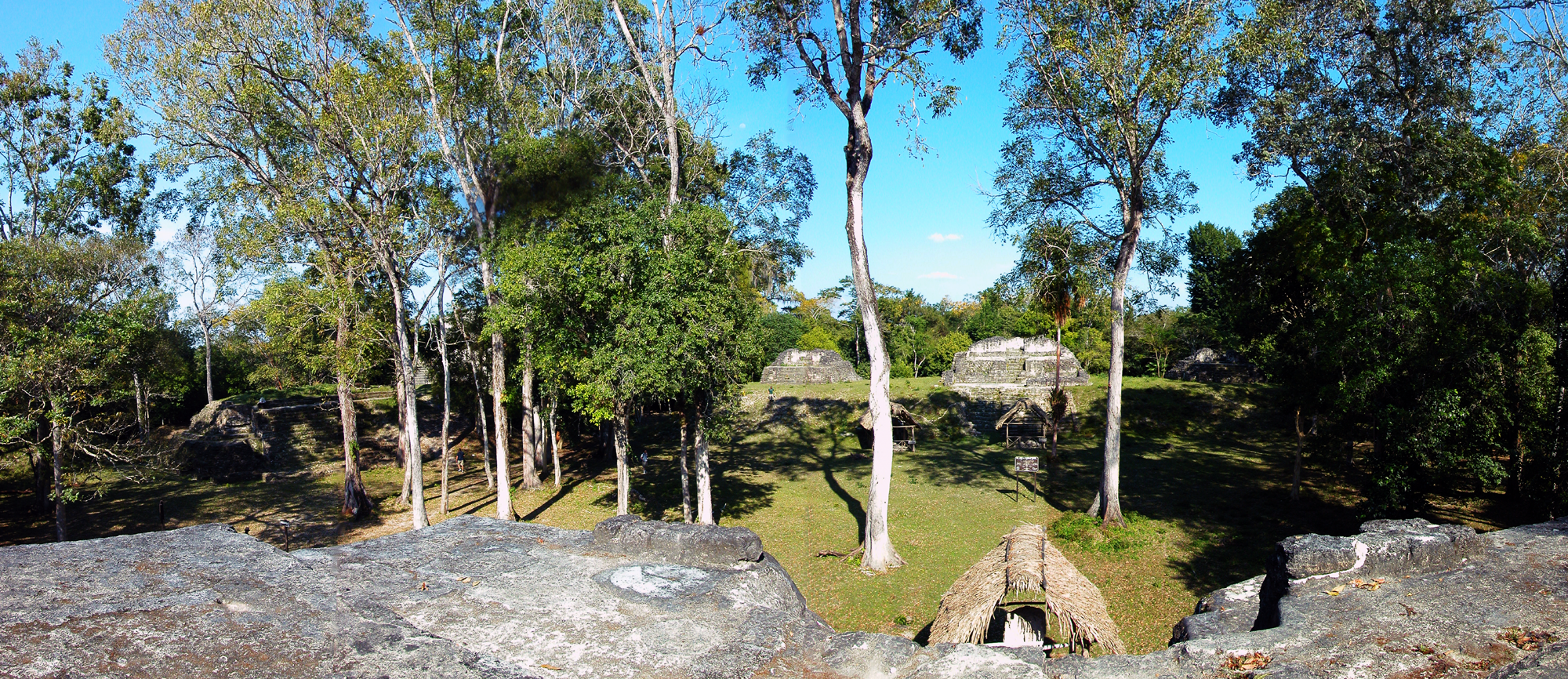
Group E view from the top of the temple of masks, Uaxactun.

== Origin of the name ==
E-Groups are named after "Group E" at the Classic period site of Uaxactun, which was the first one documented by Mesoamerican archaeologists. At Uaxactun, the Group E complex consists of a long terraced platform with three supra-structures arranged along a linear axis oriented north-south. The two smaller outlying structures flank the larger central temple. A stairway leads down to a plaza formed by Uaxacatun's Pyramid E-VII. Three stele immediately front the E-Group, and a larger stele is located midway between Group E and Pyramid E-VII. Each of the four stairways incorporated into the complex (the main central one and three leading up to each supra-structure) bears two side masks (for a total of 16). There is a small platform located on the western part of the plaza, often a tiered structure, located opposite of the central of the three supra-structures.

From a point of observation on Pyramid E-VII, the three structures have the following orientation:

- North structure (Temple E-I) – in line with the sunrise at the Summer (June) solstice
- South structure (Temple E-III) – in line with the sunrise at the Winter (December) solstice
- Central structure (Temple E-II) – in line with the sunrise at the equinoxes (September and March)

As revealed by excavation reports, however, these alignments could not have been observationally functional, because they connect architectural elements from different periods.

== Distribution in Mesoamerica ==
E-Group structures are found at a number of sites across the Maya area, particularly in the lowlands region. The oldest-known E-Groups coincide with the earliest Maya ceremonial sites of the Preclassic period, indicative of the central role played by astronomical and administrative concerns in the very beginnings of Maya ceremonial construction and planning. The oldest documented E-Group in the Yucatán Peninsula is found at the site of Seibal. However, many earlier E Groups have been found in the Olmec region, western Maya Lowlands and along the Pacific coast in Chiapas.

Construction of E-groups continues on through the Classic period, with examples of these including the Lost World Pyramid at Tikal in the Petén Basin of northern Guatemala, and Structure 5C-2nd at Cerros, in Belize. Caracol, also in Belize and the site that defeated Tikal during the Middle Classic, has a large-scale E-Group located in the western portion of its central core.

== Significance ==
=== Astronomical Use ===
E-groups have been heavily theorized to serve as astronomical observatories. In this manner, E-groups were considered useful for farmers who needed to schedule agriculture activities throughout the varying seasons. They were also hypothesized to serve as timekeeping tools for trading purposes. The leading theory stuck that E-groups were useful for observing solar zeniths, as the sun's path was significant to Maya culture. Research has found that E-groups were not precise in their astronomical measurements indicating that they were more of a symbolic rather than observational use.

=== Mesoamerican Ball Game ===
The Mesoamerican Ball Game has been associated with E-groups. Certain E-groups, such as Seibal, have ball game imagery indicating the game played by people of that site. In addition, sites like Tikal included ball courts near their E-groups.

=== Public Spaces ===
Viewsheds were one architectural aspect that were constructed at locations containing the Middle Preclassic E-Groups, who were mostly located in the Central Maya Lowlands. This discovery indicated that large plazas and other similar architectural structures demonstrate a visible community. It was observed that settlers of this region intentionally spaced these monuments apart from one another as a method of defining different groups. Additionally, recent evidence suggests that these different community spaces were civic.

=== Directionality ===
In the E-Group found within Chan's Central Group, researchers discovered that the directionality of the E-Group buildings were not only cross-linked with astrological beliefs, but also to maximize agricultural capabilities of the community. For example, the east and west buildings were correlated to the sun's natural cycle while the north and south buildings were correlated with the sun's positions at midday and in the underworld, respectively. E-Groups believed the sun also passed through the underworld when it could not be seen by the naked eye, while the sun's position at midday (north) referred to the sun shining on the heavens, exemplifying supreme power. This data collection was completed by LiDAR technology.

== History ==
=== 1924–1954 ===
Frans Blom is credited with the discovery of the first E Group in 1924 while working in Uaxactún, Guatemala, a northeast region of the Lowland Maya. This site has been dated to originate from the Pre Classic Mayan period. The E Group he identified was an open plaza defined in the west by a pyramid and in the east by a platform supporting three north–south oriented buildings. Blom posited that the assemblage was an astronomical observatory based on the observation that when viewed from the western pyramid, the three eastern buildings marked the position of the sun at sunrise on the equinoxes and solstices. From the western radial structure of the E Group, sunrise during the summer solstice could be seen above the northern structure while the sunrise during the winter solstice can be observed above the southern structure. In 1928, Oliver Ricketson theorized that the sunrises during the equinoxes could be observed over the central eastern structure.

In 1943 Karl Ruppert published his discovery of 13 more E Group structures contained in the classic Maya Lowlands. He also identified 6 more structures that were similar to Blom's original discovery but had slight differences. In addition to these, Thompson had already unknowingly excavated two E Groups. In total during this time period 25 E Groups were identified at 22 different sites–most within a 110 km radius of Uaxactún. At this point only 4 E Groups had been excavated.

=== 1955–1984 ===
During this time period 10 additional E Groups were reported with 4 more being excavated. Arlen Chase excavated the Cenote E Group in 1983 which led to him defining two styles of E Group. The first is the Cenote style which dates back to around 1000 BCE is characterized by a long eastern platform supporting one larger central building. The second kind is the Uaxactún style with the shorter eastern platform supporting three smaller structures.

In 1980 Marvin Cohodas began discussing the relationship of E Groups to celebrating agricultural cycles, an idea that was further investigated by James Aimers (1993:171–179), as well as Travis Stanton and David Freidel (2003). Cohodas also began to discuss notion that the E Group related to origin places for the sun and moon.

=== 1985–2016 ===
142 additional E Groups were discovered during this period, many located in the Southeast Petén. By this point 34 E Groups had been excavated in total. Anthony Aveni and Horst Hartung (1988, 1989) looked more at Uaxactún's Group E complex to test the theory that it functioned as an astronomical observatory with their results indicating that it likely was. Juan Pedro Laporte (2001:141) conducted a survey of 177 sites in the Southeast Petén found that 85% had an E Group assemblage. Laporte (2001:142) noted that E groups were the largest open public space at most sites hinting more at their central nature to the community.

in 2003 the alignments of 40 E Groups were analyzed showed them to be observatories (Aveni et al. 2003:162, Table 1). The analysis also showed a shift from solstice dating to zenith passage dating–a sign of influence from Teotihuacan at around 250–500 CE. Other sights were aligned with the 20-day Winals (Mayan months). This demonstrates that the particular design of a site's E Group was aligned with the values of the people that inhabited the site. There is still an ongoing debate about whether E Groups had other ritual purposes that were more important than astronomical observations, however, it is likely that both uses were important and should continue to be researched.

=== Current Research ===
Current research on E Groups has produced many important findings. The first of these is that early E Groups were made by clearing the landscape to bedrock then forming the bedrock into something with building like features. This bedrock was later encased by E Group reconstruction fills. Forming of bedrock is a common practice and important motif found across ancient America.

A second result has come from the analysis of varying E Group sizes and locations. One E Group variant found in Belize (Robin et al. 2012) is small enough and within close enough proximity to a residential complex that it can be inferred the E Group was used by a single family. This is in contrast to the Uaxactún E Group that would have been used by the whole populous. We would like to be able to use E Groups to study population density and societal structure further however a lot of later occupation has made this hard to do.

Finally, it has been discovered that most E Groups are placed strategically along crucial Mesoamerican trade routes. This calls for further investigation into the purpose of E Groups and whether they might have served some economic purposes.

== Pseudo E-Groups ==
In 2006, archaeologist, Thomas Guderjan, conducted research on, what he called, "Pseudo E-Groups." This term refers to the regional variant of E-Groups, mainly residing in northwestern Belize during the Late Classic period. These sites mainly consisted of two buildings joined by a mutual substructure. Additionally, Pseudo E-Groups lack a western building that acts as an observatory. This difference is only correlated with the E-Groups in northwestern Belize. To date, there are currently four known Pseudo E-Groups: Blue Creek, Chan Chich, San Jose, Quam Hill.
