= Mundo Perdido, Tikal =

Architectural complexes in Tikal, Guatemala

Mundo Perdido
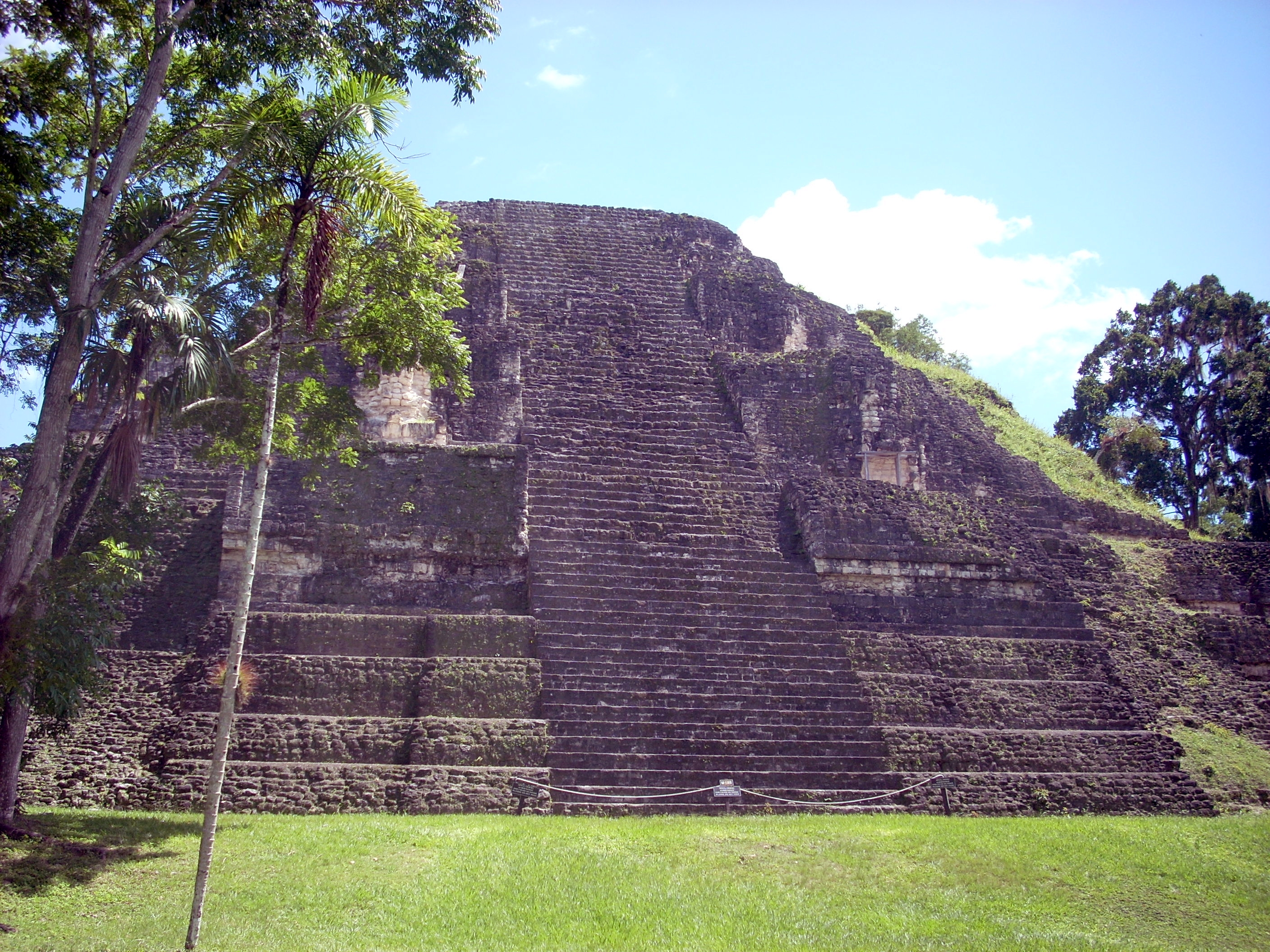
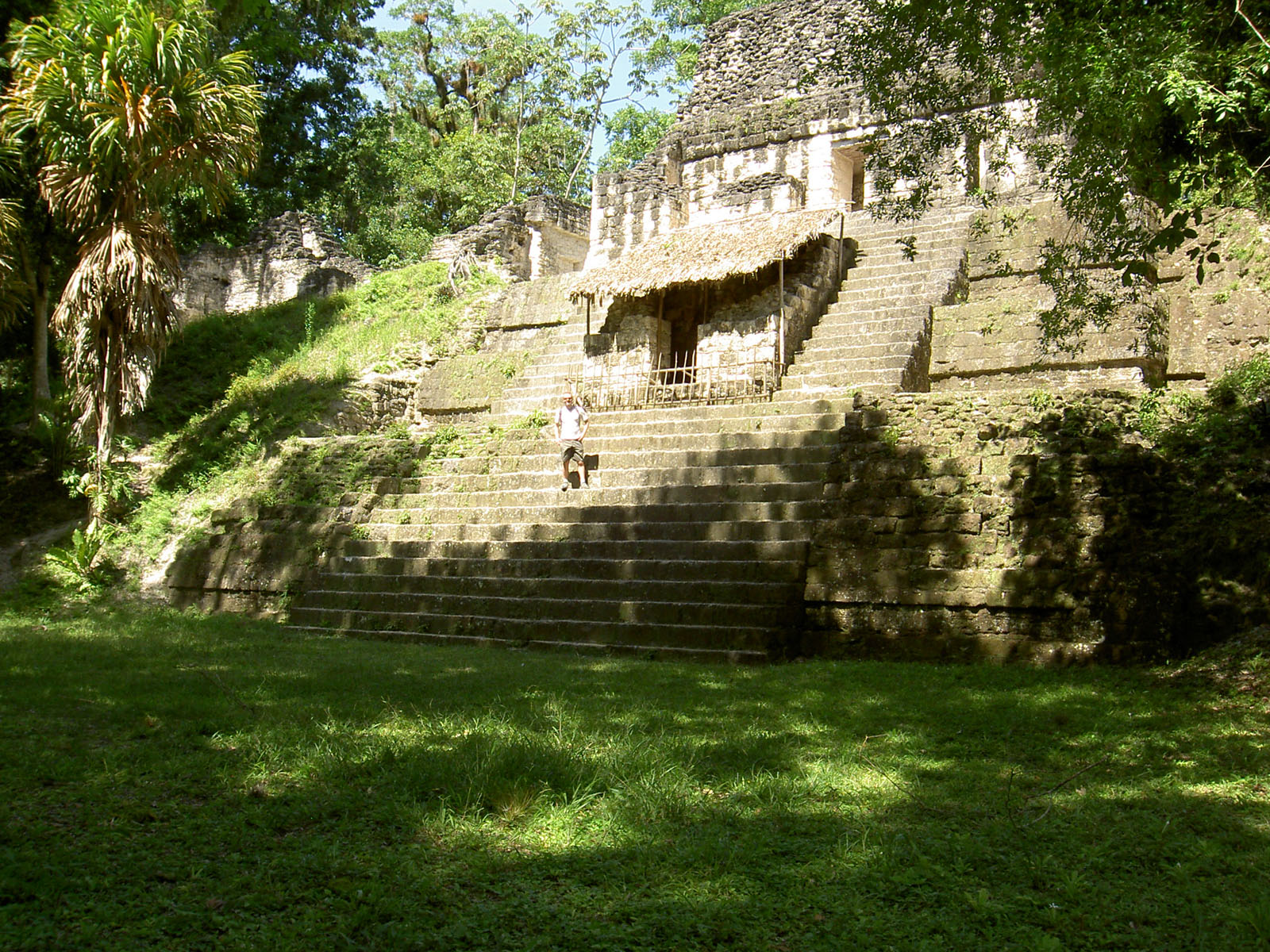
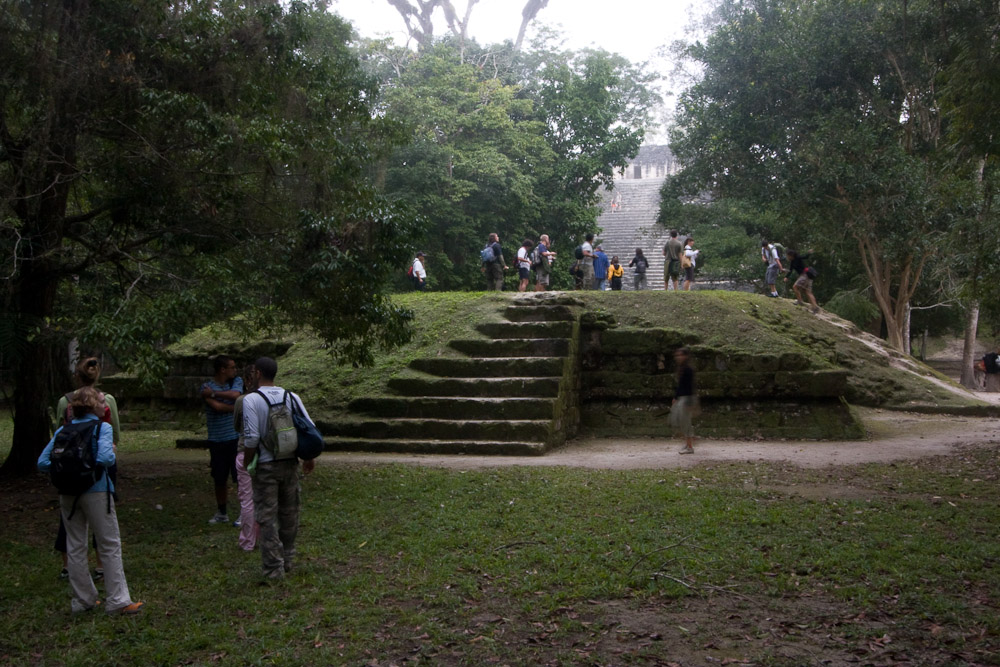
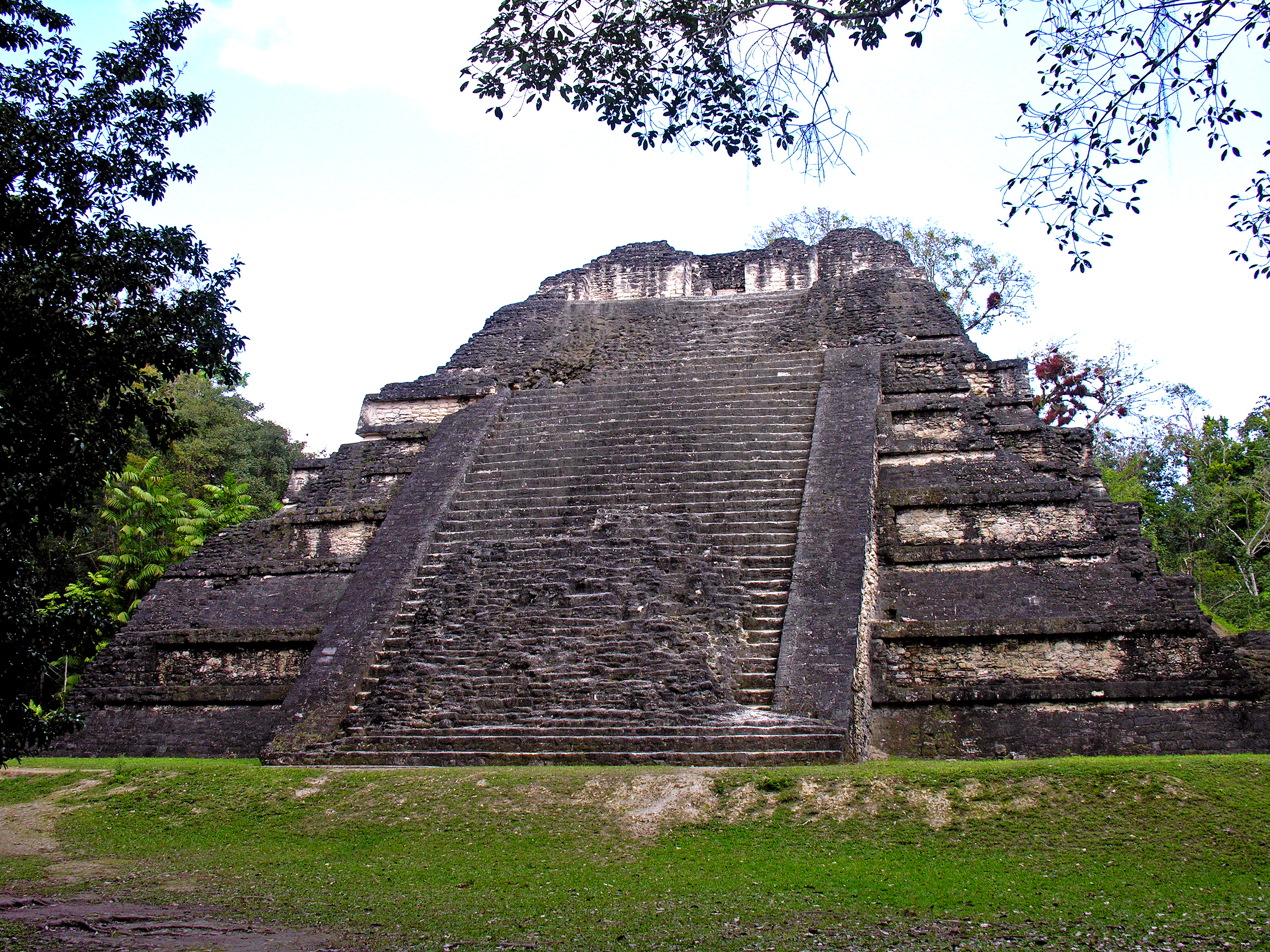
- Structure 5C-54 Structure 5D-87 Structure 5C-53 Structure 5C-49

- Location within Guatemala
- 17°13′12.17″N 89°37′40.56″W
- Periods: Preclassic–Terminal Classic
- Cultures: Maya civilization
- Location: Flores
- Region: Petén Department, Guatemala

History
- Built: c. 700 BC
- Abandoned: c. AD 900

Site notes
- Architectural styles: Talud-tablero, Preclassic & Classic Maya Number of temples: 5+
- Excavation dates: 1979–1985
- Archaeologists: William R. Coe; Juan Pedro Laporte IDAEH
- Restored by Proyecto Nacional Tikal (1979–1985) Responsible body: IDAEH

The Mundo Perdido (Spanish for 'Lost World') is the largest ceremonial complex dating from the Preclassic period at the ancient Maya city of Tikal, in the Petén Department of northern Guatemala. The complex was organised as a large E-Group astronomical complex consisting of a pyramid aligned with a platform to the east that supported three temples. The Mundo Perdido complex was rebuilt many times over the course of its history. By AD 250–300 its architectural style was influenced by the great metropolis of Teotihuacan in the Valley of Mexico, including the use of the talud-tablero form. During the Early Classic period (c. 250–600) the Mundo Perdido became one of the twin foci of the city, the other being the North Acropolis. From AD 250 to 378 it may have served as the royal necropolis. The Mundo Perdido complex was given its name by the archaeologists of the University of Pennsylvania.

The large plaza centred upon the Lost World Pyramid (5C-54) and the ceremonial platform to the west (5C-53) is divided into two clearly demarcated areas referred to as the High Plaza and the Low Plaza. The High Plaza is the area around the Lost World Pyramid. It is closed on the south side by Structures 6C-24 and 6C-25. A range of eight adjoining structures divide the High Plaza from the Plaza of the Seven Temples to the east. On the north side, the Plaza is principally delimited by Structures 5D-77, 5D-45, 5D-46, together with some smaller structures. The Low Plaza lies to the west of the Lost World Pyramid, centred upon Structure 5C-53, a low platform. The Low Plaza is closed on its north side by the Talud-Tablero Temple (5C-49), which is the second largest structure in the whole complex. The complex has a surface area of approximately 60,000 square metres (650,000 sq ft).

Guatemalan archaeologists have made major discoveries in the Mundo Perdido since the 1970s. The National Tikal Project (Proyecto Nacional Tikal) investigated the Mundo Perdido from 1979 until 1985, and partially restored the principal structures of the complex. The Mundo Perdido was the first architectural complex to be built at Tikal in the Preclassic period and the last to be abandoned during the Terminal Classic.

== History ==
=== Preclassic ===
The Mundo Perdido underwent six phases of construction; four of these date to the Preclassic and two to the Classic. Each construction phase produced a new version of the E-Group (the Lost World Pyramid and the East Platform). Evidence recovered from the Mundo Perdido dates back to the earliest years of occupation at Tikal in the Middle Preclassic prior to 700 BC, although these remains represent rubbish rather than structures. The complex began to take form around the end of the Middle Preclassic, around 600 BC, when structures started to be added to a series of artificially levelled surfaces or platforms. Gradually both the complexity and the height of the structures increased. The Lost World Pyramid and the East Platform together form an E-Group that is the oldest architectural complex in Tikal. During the Late Preclassic a causeway was built to unite the Mundo Perdido with the North Acropolis; this causeway channelled runoff rainwater into a canal that fed into the Temple Reservoir. About AD 100, toward the end of the Late Preclassic, three temples were built upon the East Platform.

=== Early Classic ===
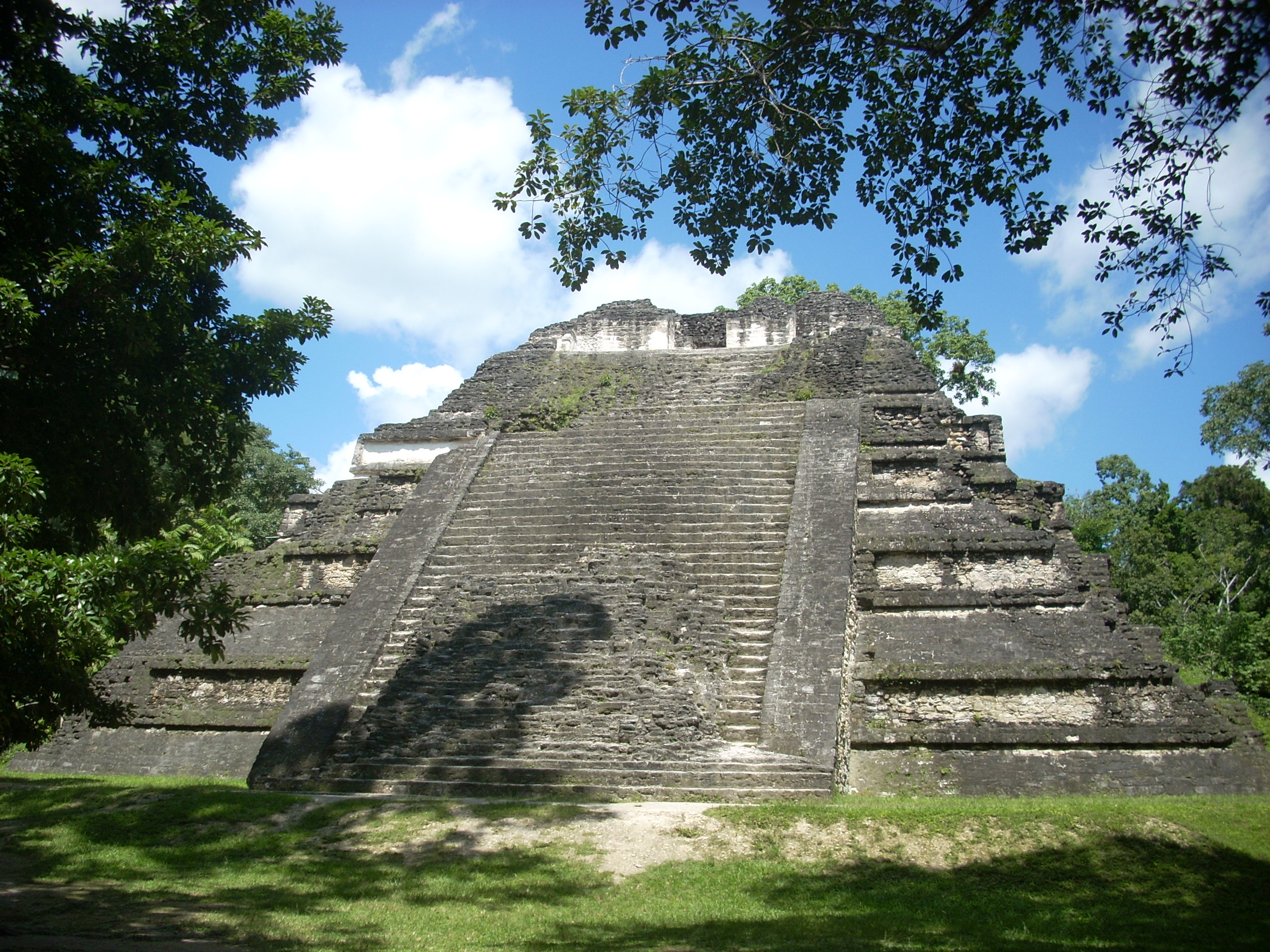
Temple 5C-49 features prominent talud-tablero architecture, a style associated with Teotihuacan

Around AD 250, at the beginning of the Early Classic, the Mundo Perdido plaza was expanded westwards in order to make the Lost World Pyramid the centre of the complex rather than the western extreme. It was this construction phase that led to the Mundo Perdido achieving its final surface area of around 60,000 square metres (650,000 sq ft). After this the various structures in the Mundo Perdido were remodelled many times to match the architectural styles developing throughout the city.

A small platform was added to the East Platform in the Early Classic, the surface of the platform possesses a series of holes that may have supported banners. The platform covered a large pit that contained the bodies of seventeen sacrificial victims, including men, women and children, possibly sacrificed during a dedicatory ceremony for the platform itself. In the 4th century AD the first version of Structure 5D-82 was built, to the north of the East Platform. In the second half of the 4th century six tombs were built in the East Platform. Ceramic offerings in the tombs included effigy vessels representing monkeys and macaws. The high artistic and technical quality of the funerary offerings in these tombs identify the deceased as members of Tikal's elite; they may have been members of a line of the ruling dynasty that lost power among the political upheaval of the late 4th century and included the kings K'inich Muwaan Jol and Chak Tok Ich'aak I. With the entry of Siyaj K'ak' and the establishment of a new political order in the city, the focus of royal funerary rites was shifted from the Mundo Perdido to the North Acropolis.

From the 4th century through to the 6th century the use of talud-tablero architecture became notable in the Mundo Perdido. In the 5th century the talud-tablero form was applied to Structures 5C-51 and 5C-52 at the western limit of the complex, and 6C-24 on the south side. In the latter part of the 6th century or during the 7th century a fifth version of the Talud-Tablero Temple 5C-49 was built, with a new stairway and summit shrine.

=== Late Classic ===
During the 7th century there were significant changes to the East Platform, including a new version of Temple 5D-87 that faced away from the Mundo Perdido. Around AD 700 this version was sealed and another version built on top, making Temple 5D-87 one of the three highest structures in the Mundo Perdido. This new version created a new orienting axis in the complex, breaking the primary axis associated with the ancient E-Group complex and its relationship with the old solar cult, thus marking a major change in the ceremonial use of the Mundo Perdido complex. It is about this same time that the twin pyramid complex came into use, demonstrating a major internal reorganisation of the city. During the Late Classic, access to the complex was gradually restricted by closing various access points with new structures, this included discontinuing the use of the causeway that had linked the complex with the North Acropolis since the Preclassic. A new palace complex was built in the northern section of the Mundo Perdido, developing during the 7th and 8th centuries AD; This marked an important change in the use of the Mundo Perdido, which until then had been dedicated to purely ritual activities. The construction of the palace indicates the permanent inhabitation of the complex by an elite group, apparently involved in some way with the administration of the city.

The Mundo Perdido continued to serve as an important burial site during the 8th and 9th centuries. The final version of the Talud-Tablero Temple received three elite status burials, possibly members of the royal family to judge by the extremely high quality of the associated offerings. These burials have been dated to the second half of the 8th century, during the reign of Yax Nuun Ayiin II.

=== Terminal Classic ===
Tikal as a whole went into general decline during the Terminal Classic, with some parts of the city apparently being abandoned. The Mundo Perdido, however, continued to be a centre of vigorous ceremonial activity. Evidence of this continued activity in the complex includes burials and collections of ceramic and lithic artefacts, together with significant construction activity. The main Late Classic structures were fitted with new benches and a change to access routes to the complex took place. Activity was concentrated in the northern portion of the Mundo Perdido, perhaps because it was closest to the Temple Reservoir water supply. Some minor changes were made to the Talud-Tablero Temple at this time. The greatest residential activity during the Terminal Classic took place in the vaulted palace immediately to the east of the Talud-Tablero Temple (Structures 5C-45 through to 5C-47). This activity included complex construction projects and indicates that the elite were still in residence immediately prior to the complete abandonment of the city. Further construction activity, in the form of structural strengthening, also took place in other structures in the northern sector, including Structures 5D-77 and 5D-82. Ritual activity also continued, and the bottom half of Early Classic Stela 39 was placed in Temple 5D-86 on the East Platform and worshipped.

That a large population remained in residence in the north sector of Mundo Perdido during the Terminal Classic is evidenced by the quantity of burials of differing gender and age. Some were interred inside collapsed buildings or in casual graves. They were usually accompanied by very few funerary offerings, generally bone and lithic artefacts. The dense occupation of the north sector, which included elite activity, continued for at least a hundred years after the abandonment of the rest of Tikal and is perhaps linked to the nearby water supply and to continued ritual activity at Temple III. While the northern portion of the Mundo Perdido continued in use, the rest of the complex was partially abandoned. The occupation of the Mundo Perdido came to an end in the Terminal Classic and very few traces of Postclassic activity have been recovered, limited to a few ceramic finds in Structure 3D-43 to the north.

=== Modern history ===
The University of Pennsylvania carried out exploratory investigations of the Lost World Pyramid prior to the work undertaken by the Proyecto Nacional Tikal. These included test cores and trenches in the summit as well as the west and south sides. Exploratory tunnels excavated up to 27 metres (89 ft) into the pyramid's interior recovered surprisingly early ceramic fragments, which led to the complex becoming the focus of later investigations. A wide-ranging programme of investigations of the Mundo Perdido was instigated by the newly formed Proyecto Nacional Tikal in September 1979. The first operation carried out was the clearing of forest overgrowth from the Lost World Pyramid late that year. The main phase of investigations ran until 1982, although test pitting and topographical surveys continued until 1984. Both the Lost World Pyramid (5C-54) and the Talud-Tablero Temple were excavated and restored from 1980 through to 1982. Soon after work started upon the Mundo Perdido in 1979 adverse weather conditions resulted in severe damage to various structures, including the collapse of the east face of the Lost World Pyramid, the northeast corner of the Talud-Tablero Temple (5C-49) and the north wall of Structure 5D-77.

== Structures ==
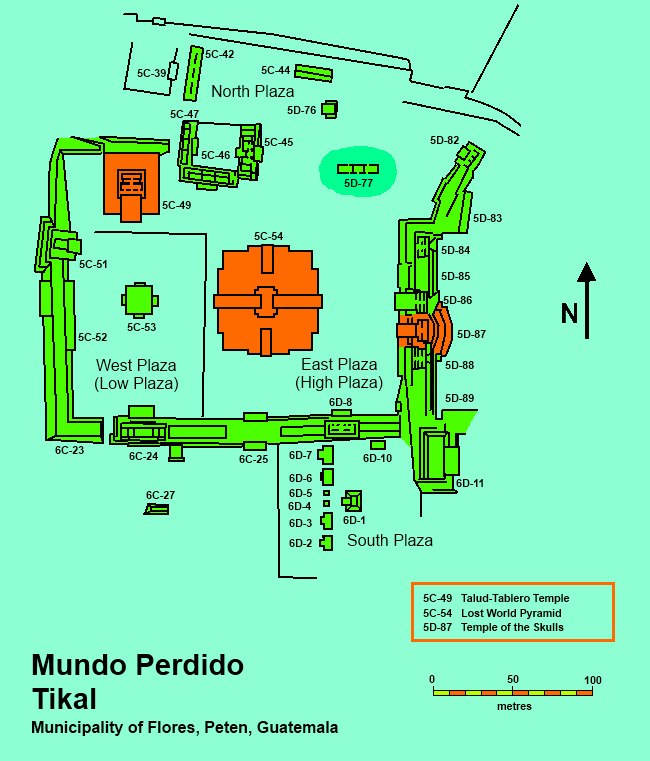
Plan of the Mundo Perdido complex

Archaeologist William R. Coe divided the Mundo Perdido complex into two clearly demarcated areas that he referred to as the High Plaza and the Low Plaza. The High Plaza is the area around the Lost World Pyramid. It is closed on the south side by Structures 6C-24 and 6C-25. A range of eight adjoining structures divide the High Plaza from the Plaza of the Seven Temples to the east. On the north side, the Plaza is principally delimited by Structures 5D-77, 5C-45, 5C-46, together with some smaller structures. The Low Plaza lies to the west of the Lost World Pyramid, centred upon Structure 5C-53, a low platform. The Low Plaza is closed on its north side by the Talud-Tablero Temple (5C-49), which is the second largest structure in the whole complex.

More recently, the Proyecto Nacional Tikal has defined the complex as an area divided into four plazas. The North, East and West Plazas are defined by their relationship to the Lost World Pyramid (5C-54) while the South Plaza is on the south side of Structures 6C-25 and 6C-25, themselves to the south of the Lost World Pyramid.

=== E-Group ===
The original core of the Mundo Perdido was an E-Group astronomical complex. The east stairway of the Lost World Pyramid (5C-54) was the observation point and the three original temples on the East Platform (5D-84, 5D-86 and 5D-88) were markers used to plot the sunrise on the equinoxes and the solstices. Over the course of Tikal's history the E-Group underwent seven distinct construction phases, with the earliest dating to the end of the Middle Preclassic period.

==== Lost World Pyramid ====
The Lost World Pyramid (Structure 5C-54, also known as the Great Pyramid) dates to the Late Preclassic. This structure is the focus of the Mundo Perdido complex; it currently stands approximately 31 metres (102 ft) high and has a maximum width across the base of 67.5 metres (221 ft). The Lost World Pyramid was one of the most massive construction projects ever undertaken at Tikal. The pyramid is accessed via a stairway on the west side; this was flanked by giant masks. The final version of the structure had stairways on both the east and west sides that extended to the top, with additional stairways on the north and south sides climbing only as far as the eighth of ten levels. This structure was one of the most massive buildings in the whole of Late Preclassic Mesoamerica and its construction used masonry blocks that measured over 1.8 metres (5.9 ft) long. The pyramid was periodically rebuilt throughout its history, in common with the rest of the complex. The version now visible is the fifth version, dating to around AD 250. When it was built it was the tallest structure in the entire city. The stepped levels of the pyramid have inset vertical panels that were forerunners of the talud-tablero style; these early tableros first made an appearance in the second half of the 3rd century AD when they were built into the fifth construction phase of the pyramid. The masks that once adorned the sides of the building are now so eroded that it is not possible to determine if they were anthropomorphic or zoomorphic. Traces of painted stucco on the final version of the pyramid reveal that at some point the exterior of the structure was painted blue and red.

Construction phases of the Lost World Pyramid
Version	Date	Height	Width (N-S)	Levels
1st	c. 600 BC	2.94 metres (9.6 ft)	23.46 metres (77.0 ft)	3
2nd	c. 500 BC	7.8 metres (26 ft)	37.25 metres (122.2 ft)	4
3rd	c. 300 BC	9.46 metres (31.0 ft)	37.67 metres (123.6 ft)	6
4th	c. 1 BC	18 metres (59 ft)	60 metres (200 ft)	8+
5th	c. AD 250	30.7 metres (101 ft)	72 metres (236 ft)	10

The five versions of the Lost World Pyramid were each larger than the previous version. They were not built directly centred upon the preceding version due to the necessity of maintaining the E-Group plaza area between the pyramid and the East Platform. This led to the destruction of the previous version's east face each time a new version was superimposed over the older version.

===== Phase 1 =====
The earliest version of the pyramid was built at the end of the Middle Preclassic; it was raised upon a 1.42-metre (4.7 ft) deep infill that levelled the natural terrain. This earliest phase of construction has not survived in its entirety but is believed to have possessed three stepped levels with stairways on all four sides. It measured 23.46 metres (77.0 ft) north-south and stood 2.94 metres (9.6 ft) high.

===== Phase 2 =====
The second version dates to the Late Preclassic, between 600 and 400 BC. At this time two adult males were interred without funerary offerings under the summit platform of the pyramid (Burials PNT-002 and PNT-003). Although they lacked associated offerings, the presence of cranial deformation and dental decoration suggests that the deceased may have been members of the elite. The investigating archaeologists of the Proyecto Nacional Tikal consider that the deceased themselves were a dedicatory offering upon construction of this newer version of the pyramid. The second version of the pyramid possessed four stepped levels and measured 37.25 metres (122.2 ft) north-south; it stood 7.8 metres (26 ft) high.

===== Phase 3 =====
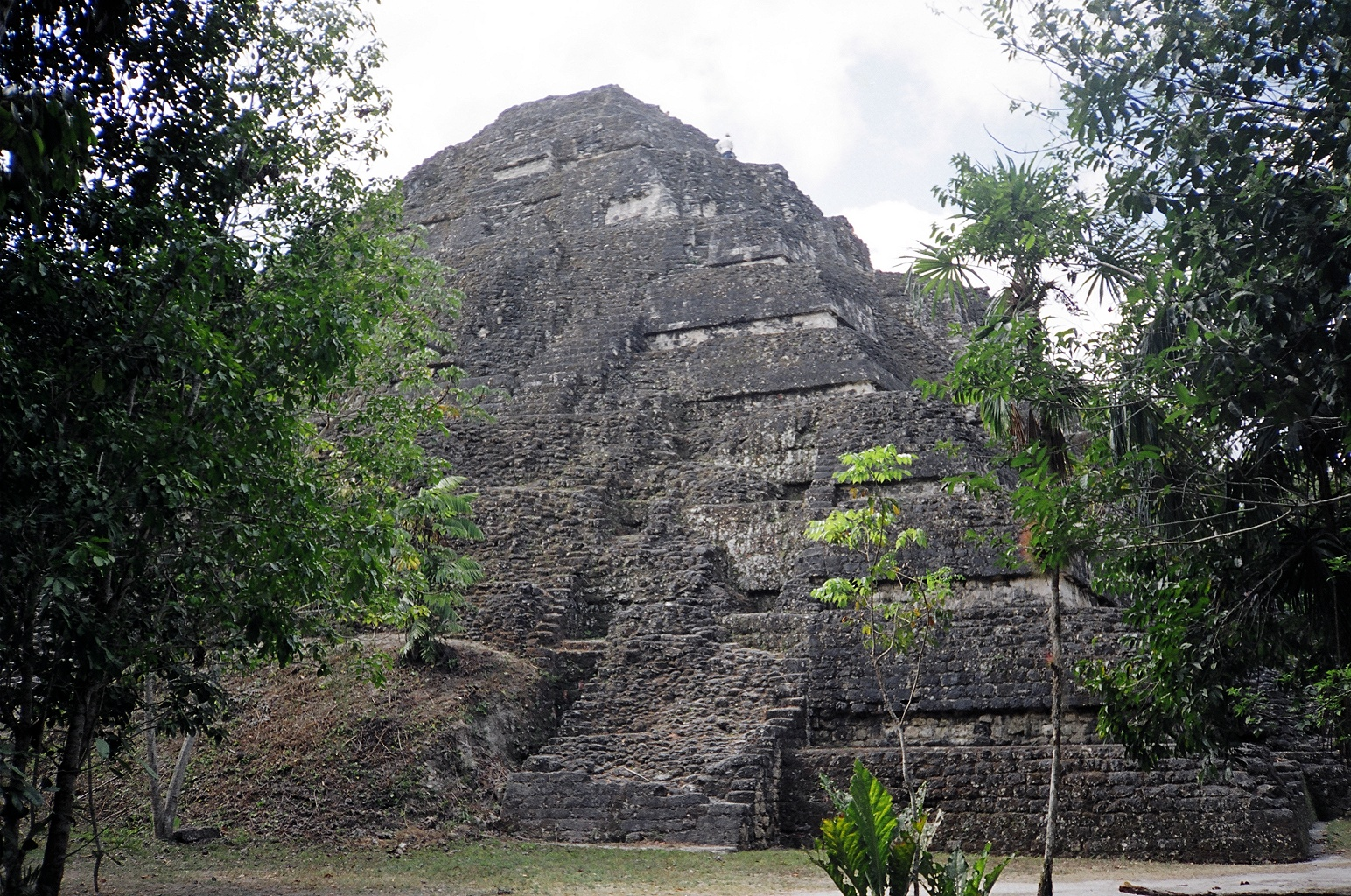
The Lost World Pyramid viewed from the north

The third version was built between 400 and 200 BC as a part of the formal layout of the E-Group. This version measured 37.67 metres (123.6 ft) north-south and stood 9.46 metres (31.0 ft) high. The construction of the third version of the temple damaged the underlying second version and covered it completely. The third version was a radial pyramid with six stepped levels and a raised upper platform built from stone blocks that were not finished with stucco. This upper platform had rounded corners. The three lower levels of the pyramid had a talud (sloping-sided) form, while the fourth had a tablero (vertical-sided) form. The fifth level was of greater height and supported the weight of giant masks flanking the central stairways as they ascend the upper (sixth) level. The pyramid possessed auxiliary stairways that climbed the lower four levels, flanking the central stairways; they ascended the fifth level in a modified form, such that they enclosed the giant masks between the auxiliary stairways and the central stairways on each side. Upon the upper platform was a 1-metre (3.3 ft) high bench accessed via three steps on its east and west sides only. The third version pyramid was of high quality construction with complex architectural detail and fine quality stucco covering. Burial PNT-001 was discovered interred within the infill of the upper level of the fourth version of the pyramid; it was accompanied by a number of offerings.

===== Phase 4 =====
The fourth version of the pyramid was built upon a much larger scale; it was built sometime between 200 BC and 200 AD. It stood 18 metres (59 ft) high and measured 60 metres (200 ft) across. This represented the greatest leap in volume between successive versions of the pyramid. Once again it was a radial pyramid with auxiliary stairways; the temple had at least eight stepped levels although archaeologists could not determine the exact number due to the destruction wrought upon the summit by the construction of the next (fifth and final) version. It possessed giant masks on the fifth stepped level. Due to the method of construction employed, with weight dispersed across the shorter sides of its stone blocks, the fourth version of the pyramid was structurally weak and it required periodic reinforcement. The architects soon realised their error and the architectural techniques used in the construction of the fourth version were never used again; the fourth version itself remained in use for a relatively short period of time before being replaced by the fifth version.

===== Phase 5 =====
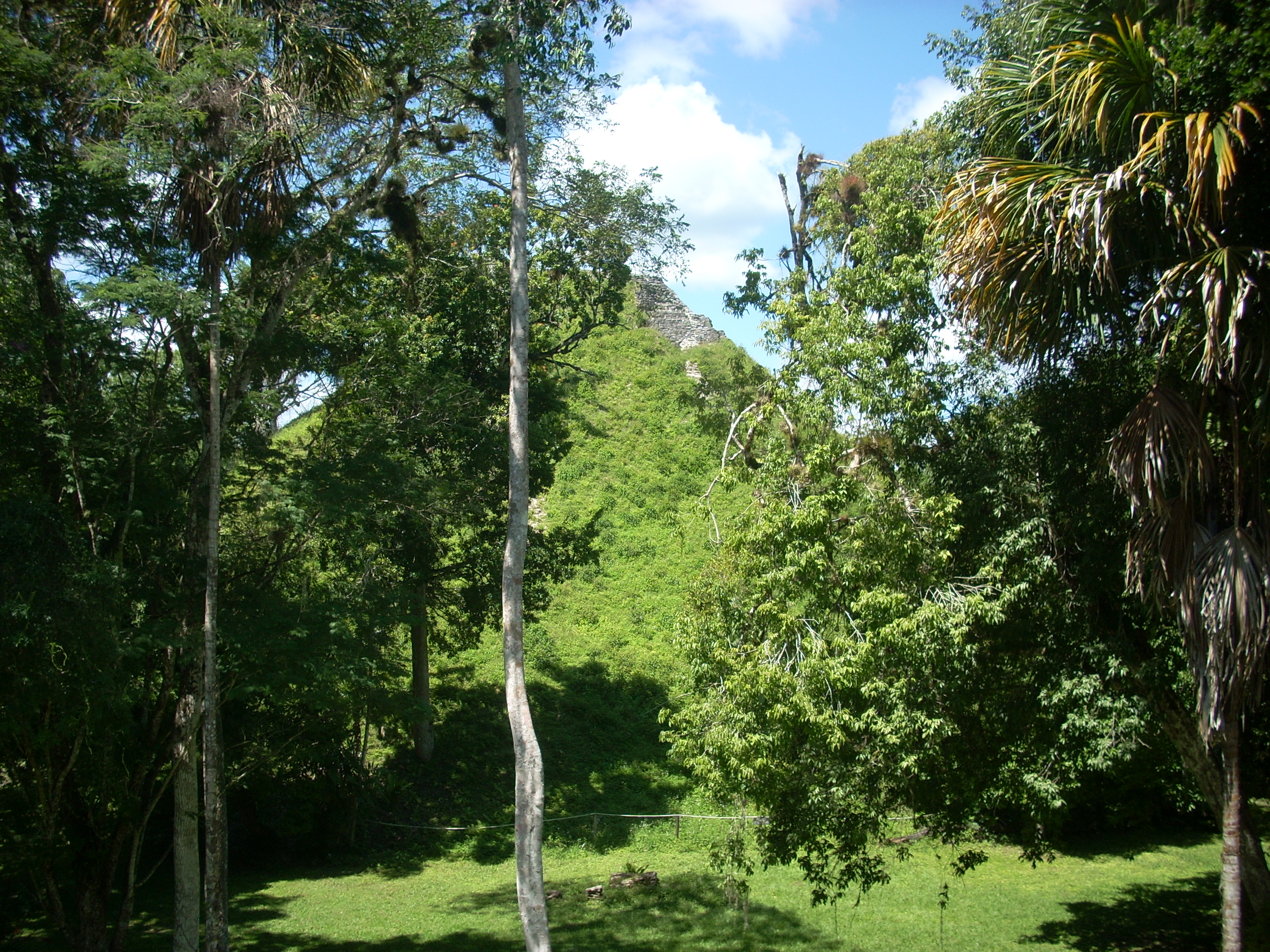
The collapsed and overgrown east face of the Lost World Pyramid, as seen from the East Platform of the E-Group

The fifth and final version of the Lost World Pyramid was built around 200-300 AD. When excavated it was found to be poorly preserved due to the poor quality structural infill used in its construction; its sides had subsided in a number of places. The final version of the pyramid had ten levels and stood 30.7 metres (101 ft) high. The pyramid measured 72 by 67.5 metres (236 by 221 ft) (NS by EW) through its central axis. This narrowed to 61.3 by 56.25 metres (201.1 by 184.5 ft) measuring from corner to corner. These measurements make it the most massive construction project at Tikal. The fifth version of the pyramid started with 8 levels between 200 and 300 AD; a ninth level was added in the 4th century and the tenth level sometime between the late 4th century and the early 6th century. Each of the stairways was flanked by large tablero panels. The 0.5-metre (1.6 ft) bench upon the summit faced west, breaking the long tradition that incorporated the pyramid within the ancient E-Group. A large slab of slate measuring 0.9 metres (3.0 ft) high by 0.35 metres (1.1 ft) wide and 0.24 metres (0.79 ft) thick was found embedded in the bench; it was highly eroded and may have been a stela that was erected upon the pyramid during the Late Classic. Large quantities of Early and Late Classic ceramic fragments were found upon the pyramid, demonstrating the continued importance of the structure within Tikal as a whole. A well-preserved limestone model of an architectural complex was recovered from the upper east side of the pyramid; it may originally have been deposited in a cache and represented a number of pyramids and a Mesoamerican ballcourt - the model does not match any known architectural group at Tikal itself.

==== East Platform ====
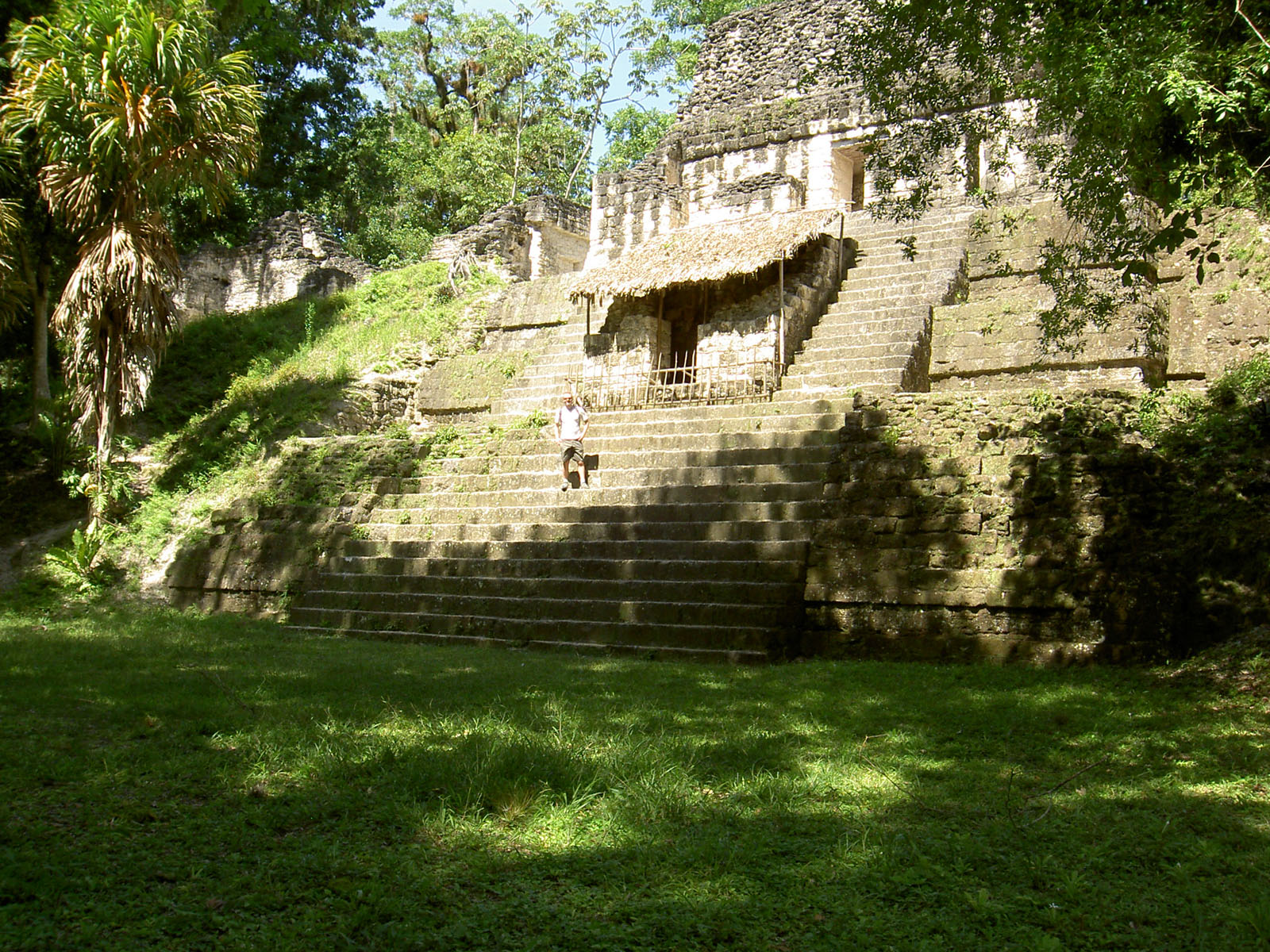
The restored Structure 5D-87 (Temple of the Skulls) upon the East Platform

The East Platform divides the Mundo Perdido complex from the Plaza of the Seven Temples. The structures are numbered from 5D-82 at the north end through to 5D-89 where it joins with the south range. Although this is one of the earliest examples of architecture at Tikal, this platform began to take on its final form around AD 100 when the first versions of the three temples 5D-84, 5D-86 and 5D-88 were built upon the basal platform. In the 5th century AD the platform was remodeled with a huge talud-tablero.

Structure 5D-82 is the northernmost structure adjoining the East Platform. The first version of this building was built in the 4th century AD. This early version was a semicircular platform supporting a building that possessed a single chamber. This building was decorated with an elaborate stucco frieze decorated with anthropomorphic figures and glyphs. The central figure in the frieze is believed by archaeologists to represent the deity Itzamna.

Structure 5D-84 is towards the north end of the east range; the structure has three rooms and is flanked by Structure 5D-83 to the north and Structure 5D-86 to the south. This is one of the earliest three structures to be built upon the east platform towards the end of the Late Preclassic.

Structure 5D-85 is a double platform that provides access to the Plaza of the Seven Temples.

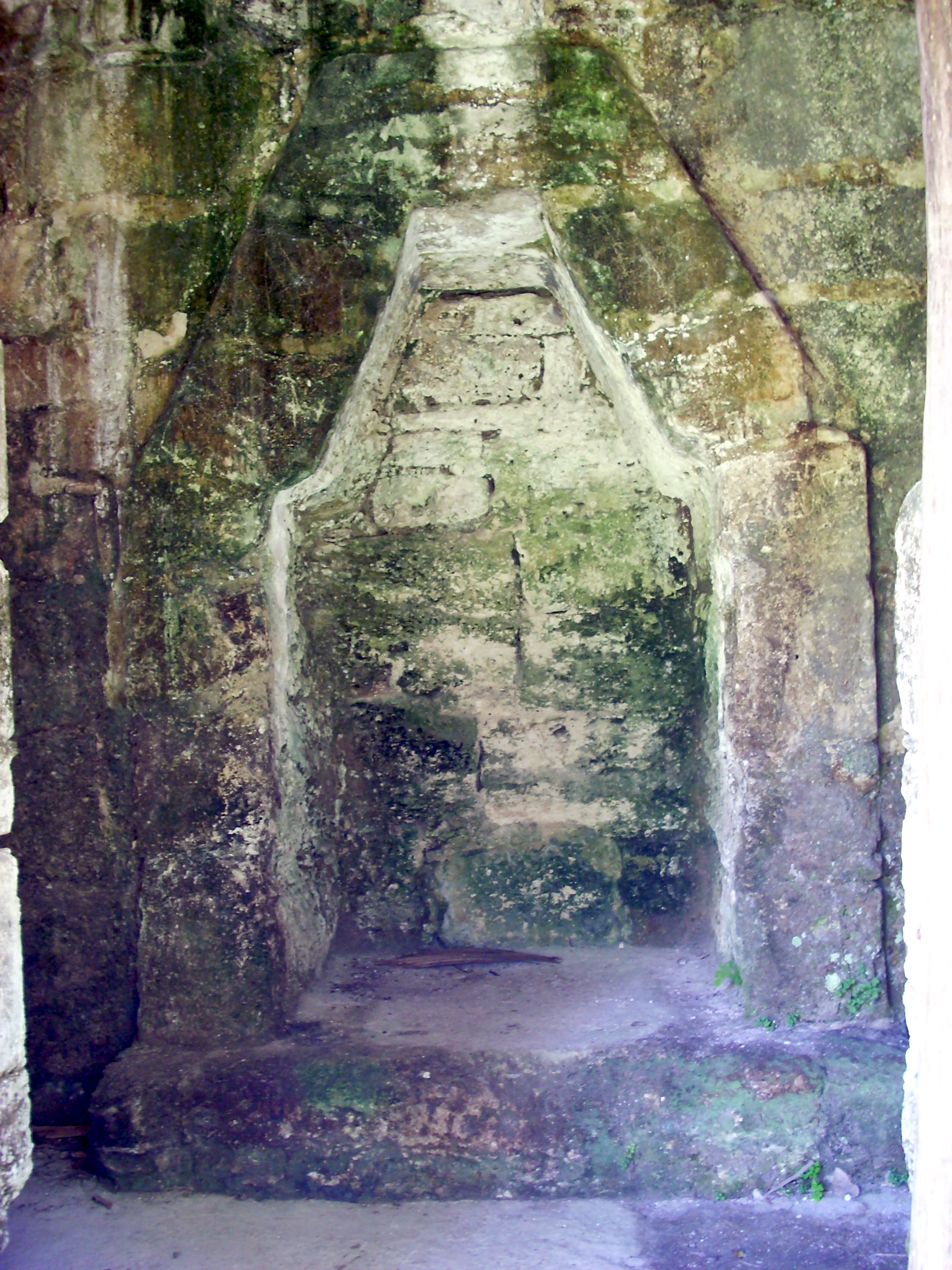
Vaulted niche in the access stairway of Temple 5D-87, dated to around AD 700

Structure 5D-86 possesses the remains of giant masks on its facade. It has been dated to the Late Classic period. Stela 39 was found in this building. The first version of this building was raised upon the East Platform towards the end of the Late Preclassic period, at around AD 100. The temple had three rooms arranged one behind the other; the central chamber is the smallest and is particularly notable for the presence of two giant zoomorphic masks on either side of its doorway. This is the only example known from the Late Preclassic Maya world where such masks were placed inside a building, a practice that would become common in the Late Classic period. Iconographic analysis of these two masks suggest that they are an early form of Nu B'alam Chac, a spirit protector of the city that was closely associated with warfare. The first royal tomb in the Mundo Perdido was installed in this structure during the transition between the Late Preclassic and Early Classic periods.

Structure 5D-87 is also known as the Temple of the Skulls (Templo de las Calaveras in Spanish). It is the third largest temple in the Mundo Perdido complex. A new version of this temple was superimposed upon a preceding version during the 7th century AD. This new version faced away from the Mundo Perdido and possessed a single room with five doorways that faced onto the adjacent Plaza of the Seven Temples to the east. Around AD 700, this version was sealed and a new version was built on top, at which time it became one of the highest structures in the Mundo Perdido. This version of the structure had a four-level platform with an access stairway interrupted by a vaulted niche, as was the architectural style prevalent at Tikal during this time. The base of the niche was adorned with three sculpted skulls, one facing forwards and the two flanking skulls in profile.

Structure 5D-88 is a structure possessing three rooms. It was one of the first three temples to be built upon the East Platform towards the end of the Late Preclassic period.

Structure 5D-89 is another structure possessing three rooms.

=== Northern sector ===
==== Talud-Tablero Temple ====
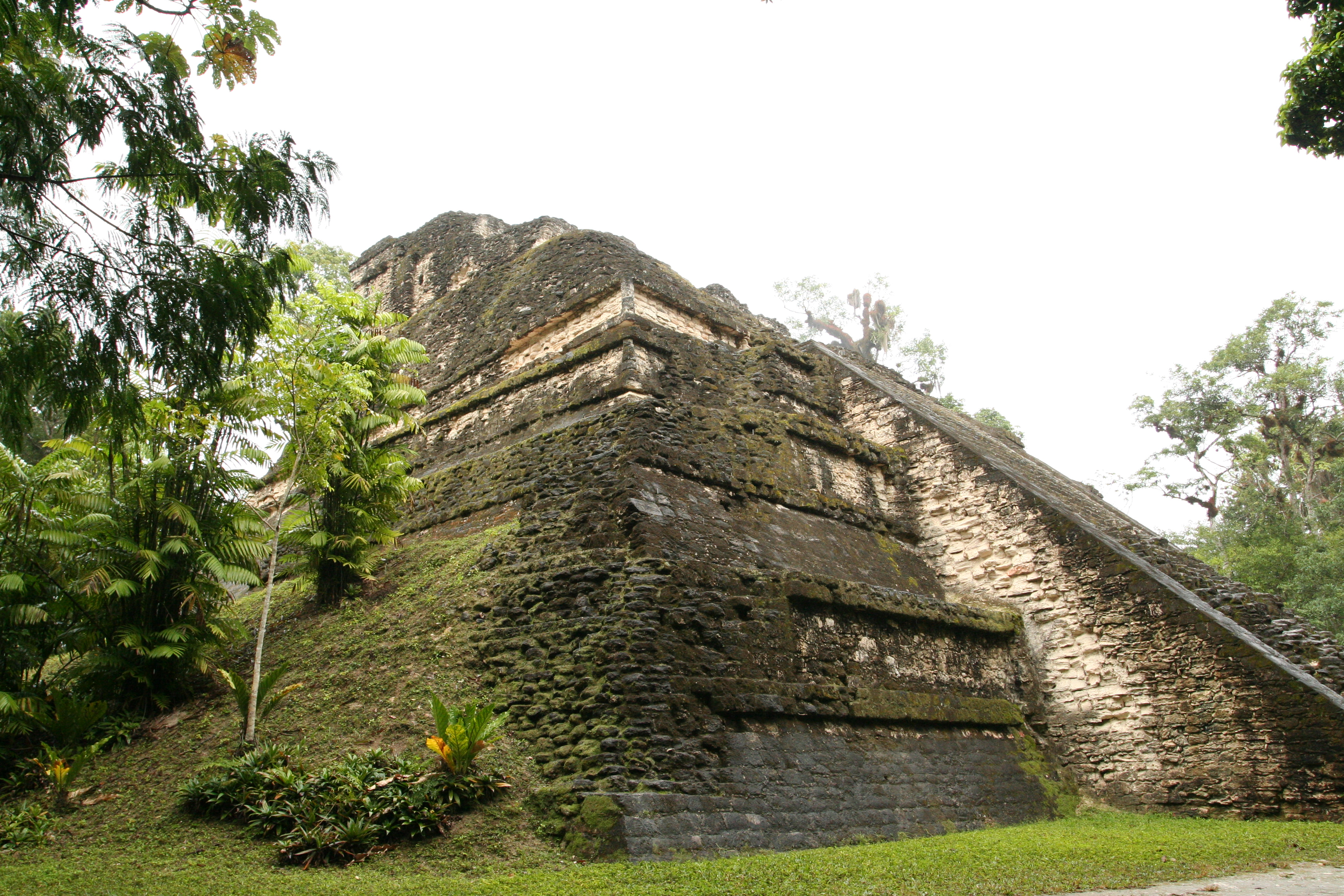
View of the Talud-Tablero temple from the southwest, showing the projecting stairway

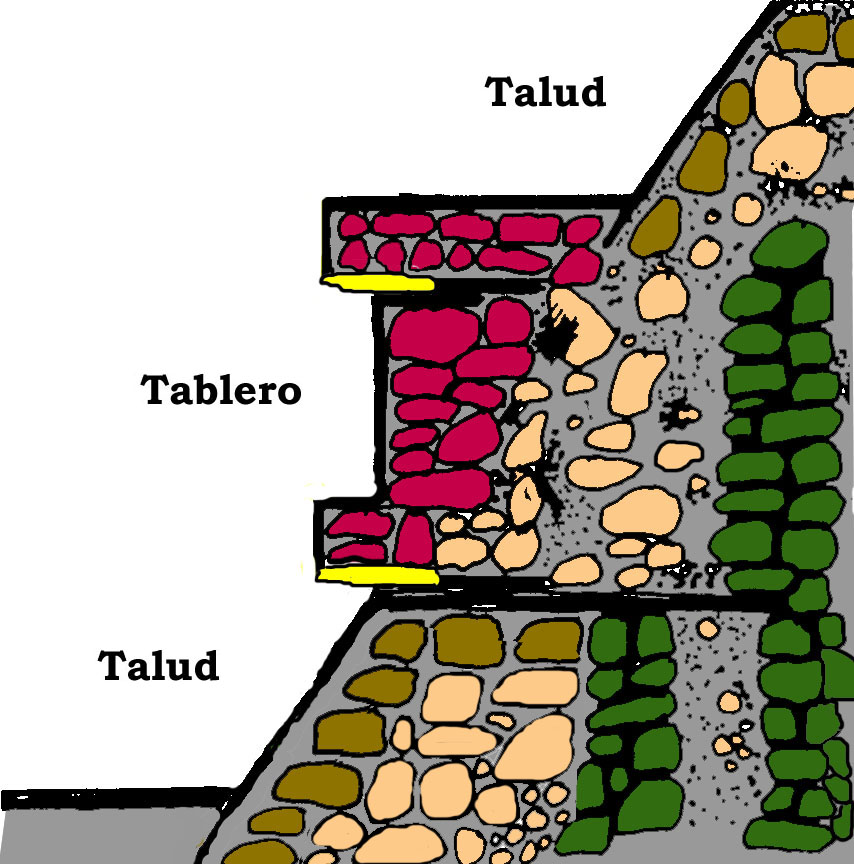
Cross-section of talud-tablero-style architecture

The Talud-Tablero Temple (Structure 5C-49) is the second largest building in the Mundo Perdido. It is located on the north side of the west plaza, to the northwest of the Lost World Pyramid and directly north of the 5C-53 platform. The pyramid has a projecting stairway that rises to a summit shrine that possessed three corbel-vaulted chambers and a roof comb; the ceilings and roof comb had collapsed into the first two chambers prior to archaeological exploration. The ruined building currently stands over 22 metres (72 ft) high; with its summit shrine and roof comb intact it would have been taller. The Talud-Tablero Temple was not investigated by the University of Pennsylvania and prior to its exploration by the Proyecto Nacional Tikal the summit shrine had served as the lair of a jaguar and was littered with the remains of its prey. The shrine has been badly damaged by multiple looters' pits excavated in each of the interior chambers.

Three distinct construction phases are evident on the exterior of this pyramid. The first version of this pyramid was built in the latter half of the 3rd century AD; it was built in a forerunner of the talud-tablero style and had three levels. It stood 7 metres (23 ft) tall with sides that measured 21 metres (69 ft) at the base. It featured vertical unframed tableros that were painted black and a stairway flanked by balustrades. The stairway rose at an angle of 49° and projected 3.3 metres (11 ft) from the pyramid base. Three more construction phases took place in the Early Classic between AD 300 and 550; none of these three phases supported a masonry superstructure. Each of these phases was very similar, consisting mainly in an increase in the size of the building. Phase 2 had a basal surface area of 920 square metres (9,900 sq ft); the base of the third phase covered an area of 1,065 square metres (11,460 sq ft), this increased to 1,240 square metres (13,300 sq ft) in the fourth construction phase. The second phase of construction took place in the 4th century in a local variation of the talud-tablero style that only included framed tableros on the front of the pyramid, except for the upper level where the tableros extend around all four faces of the structure; it had four stepped levels. The third phase of construction maintained the previous versions talud-tablero variant and had five stepped levels. The fourth version of the pyramid once again had four stepped levels. The fifth phase of construction of this building took place between AD 550 and 700 and involved the construction of a new stairway on top of the previous version, although the older four-level stepped pyramid with talud-tablero sides was retained. The pyramid base now measured 37 metres (121 ft) on each side. The stairway was widened by covering the balustrades and the pyramid was heightened by 4.6 metres (15 ft) by the addition of two more talud-tablero-style levels. This resulted in a base height of 16.4 metres (54 ft); a new summit shrine was built upon this, possessing three vaulted rooms and an elaborate roof comb. This construction phase took place around the same time that Temple V was built, the first of the major temples of Tikal, or slightly earlier. The shrine, in its final version, had three access doorways to the first chamber, which was 3 metres (9.8 ft) wide.

After AD 700 the pyramid served an important funerary function. Three elite burials have been excavated from the pyramid, two males and a female, accompanied by extremely high quality funerary offerings. The offerings include polychrome ceramics and objects crafted from shell, conch and mother of pearl that are inscribed with anthropomorphic and zoomorphic imagery. These associated finds are of sufficient quality that it is possible that the deceased were members of the royal family. The burials have been dated to the reign of Yax Nuun Ayiin II, who ruled from AD 769 to 794. During the Terminal Classic some minor changes were made to the temple chambers and there may have been structural reinforcement of the front of the temple. Although it is poorly preserved, the inside of the temple rooms were inscribed with graffiti that is likely to date to this time.

==== Palace ====
A three-range palace complex is laid out in the form of a U in the northern portion of the Mundo Perdido. The three ranges are 5C-45 on the east side, 5C-46 on the south side and 5C-47 on the west side. All three ranges connect at the corners to form a single extended palace around a central courtyard with an area of 600 square metres (6,500 sq ft); the courtyard was open on the north side. This palace has furnished important information with regard to the Terminal Classic occupation the Mundo Perdido. The palace was built upon a Late Classic platform and gradually developed with the construction of the palace buildings in the 7th and 8th centuries AD. The structures each housed multiple corbel-vaulted chambers. On two of the three structures the decorated facades faced outwards, although the buildings all opened onto the interior courtyard. During the 1500-year history of the Mundo Perdido complex, the palace was the only group of buildings in the entire complex that did not serve a uniquely ceremonial purpose.

Structure 5C-45 is the east range of a palace complex that also incorporates 5C-46 (the south range) and 5C-47 (the west range). This structure was remodelled in the Terminal Classic with the closing of some doorways, addition of some benches and the construction of new sections with multiple doorways. Although Tikal was completely abandoned soon afterwards, this continuation in complex construction activity indicated that the elite residents were still inhabiting the palace at this time.

=== Other structures ===
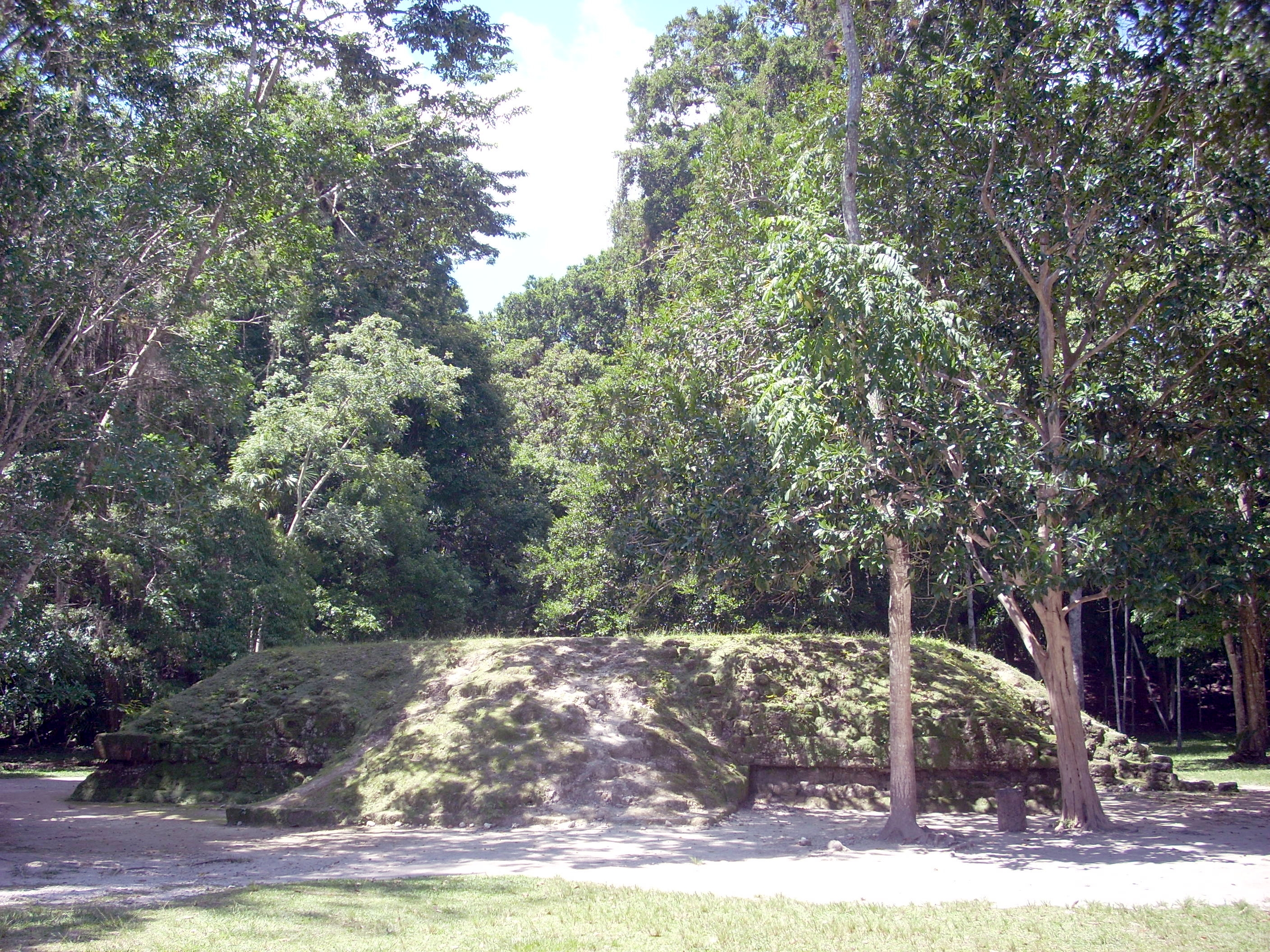
Structure 5C-53 displays influence from the distant city of Teotihuacan

Structure 5C-51 is on the western border of the complex. It was modelled in the talud-tablero style in the 5th century AD.

Structure 5C-52 delimits the western extreme of the Mundo Perdido. In the 5th century AD it was built using the talud-tablero style.

Structure 5C-53 is a low platform situated 33 metres (108 ft) to the west of the Lost World Pyramid. The platform has access stairways on all four sides and has no sign of ever having supported any superstructure. Details of the sides of the platform suggest that its construction was influenced by Teotihuacan. The platform dates to the beginning of the Late Classic, around AD 600.

Structure 6C-24 is a part of the south range of the Mundo Perdido. This is another building that was styled with talud-tableros in the 5th century AD.

== Monuments ==
Stela 39 is the broken bottom half of a stela that was found inside Temple 5D-86, on the east–west axis running through the East Platform from the Lost World Pyramid. The monument is sculpted on the front and back faces and was deliberately broken in ancient times and was moved inside the temple in order to save it. The front of the stela shows the bottom half of a person, who is identified as a ruler by his costume; the back features two columns of hieroglyphs. The king depicted on the stela is Chak Tok Ich'aak I, who governed in the 4th century AD. This king is standing over a bound captive; the bearded captive appears to be a noble since he retains his clothing. The stela celebrates an event in AD 376 and appears to have been moved to the Mundo Perdido in relation to a funerary ceremony. The stela was possibly moved to the temple by king Yax Nuun Ayiin II to celebrate the changing of the 20-year k'atun Maya calendrical cycle in AD 771 and thereby link himself to Chak Tok Ich'aak I. It was placed directly over the most important of the late 4th century elite tombs. The stela continued to be worshipped in the Terminal Classic, as evidenced by the presence of polychrome ceramic offerings and incense burners.

== Burials ==
Burial 5 was an elite burial interred in a stucco-coated chamber under the rear chamber of the Talud-Tablero Temple (5C-49). The tomb had already been looted when it was discovered by archaeologists, with a looters trench cutting through the bench and floor of the shrine chamber above. The burial chamber measured 1.77 by 0.8 metres (5.8 by 2.6 ft) (NS by EW) and was 0.87 metres (2.9 ft) high. The chamber contained the bones of an adult male aged between 36 and 55 years old. Although the bones had been disturbed by the looters, it is likely that he had been laid out on his back with a north–south orientation. A few broken ceramic remains among the looters' debris dated the tomb to the late 8th century AD.

Burial 6 was a cist located under the first chamber of the Talud-Tablero Temple (5C-49). It had been heavily looted, to an extent that it was not possible to determine if the scattered human remains of at least four people belonged to one burial or several. The bones belonged to two children and two young adult females and fragments of ceramic offerings were also identified.

Burial 7 was interred in a cist under the central chamber of the Talud-Tablero Temple (5C-49). Although it had already been looted when it was discovered by archaeologists, the prior collapse of the ceiling of the summit shrine of the pyramid protected a section of the tomb from the looters. The remains were those of an adult male with an artificially deformed skull; he was laid out on his back with a north–south orientation with the head towards the north. The funerary offering included three polychrome ceramics; a tripod plate, a plate painted with the figure of a dancer and a vessel bearing the images of human figures and a jaguar. Burial 7 was immediately above the cist of Burial 9.

Burial 8 was interred towards the rear of the Talud-Tablero Temple (5C-49). The deceased was a young adult male aged between 21 and 35 years old with an artificially deformed skull. He was buried near the surface lying on his side in a flexed position; The remains were oriented north–south and date to the Terminal Classic and were not accompanied by any funerary offering.

Burial 9 was interred in a cist immediately beneath Burial 7 in the Talud-Tablero Temple (5C-49). The chamber measured 2.34 by 0.64 metres (7.7 by 2.1 ft) (NS by EW). The remains were of an adolescent female lying on her back with her head towards the north. She was lying upon a layer of cinnabar mixed with blue and green pigments and was accompanied by a rich funerary offering. The offering included mother-of-pearl, jade and quartz beads, bone earspools inlaid with shell, shell figurines, glyphs crafted from shell, a jade pectoral crafted in the form of an anthropomorphic face, an alabaster bowl, a polychrome ceramic vessel decorated with human figures and a lengthy hieroglyphic text, a black bowl and a tripod plate decorated with an ajaw glyph.

Burial 21 was the first corbel-vaulted tomb to be constructed in the Mundo Perdido; it was placed within Structure 5D-86. The deceased was interred upon the east–west axis running through the centre of the E-Group during the transition between the Late Preclassic and the Early Classic periods. The tomb was elite-status and was perhaps the earliest royal burial in the Mundo Perdido. Any funerary offerings were removed during the 6th century AD during remodelling of the temple, at which time the offerings were redeposited under the third chamber of the shrine. The offerings included three polychrome plates with mammiform legs; the painted designs on the plates perhaps have astronomical significance.

Burial PNT-001 dates to between 400 and 200 BC. It was inserted in a put among the infill of the upper level of the third version of the Lost World Pyramid (5C-54), 0.8 metres (2.6 ft) under the summit (1.8 metres (5.9 ft) including the summit bench). He was laid out upon a large rock lying face downwards. The deceased was a young adult male aged between 21 and 35 years who was aligned north–south with the skull towards the south. Traces of cinnabar were found upon the bones. The body was accompanied by four ceramic vessels, five obsidian blades, a flint chisel, avian bones and some worked bone artefacts, among them an earspool. Although the burial could be a dedicatory offering due to its location upon the east–west axis of the E-Group, the high status offerings associated with it also open up the possibility that the deceased was a member of Tikal's elite.

Burial PNT-002 was interred with Burial PNT-003 in the third stepped platform of the second version of the Lost World Pyramid (5C-54) prior to the fourth platform being completed. The deceased was an adult male aged between 36 and 55 years old; he was found lying extended on his back with a southeast-northwest orientation. Most of the bones were preserved to a certain degree; although the skull was badly fragmented it was evident that artificial craneal deformation had taken place. One of the upper canine teeth was fitted with pyrite decoration; the other canine had a crescent-shaped hollow that had once held its decoration. The deceased had several items of shell jewellery.

Burial PNT-003 was interred at the same time as Burial PNT-002. The deceased was an adult male aged between 36 and 55 years old; he was lying face down with a northwest-southeast orientation. The remains were very poorly preserved but the upper canines were both decorated with pyrite incrustations. The deceased was not accompanied by jewellery or funerary offerings.

Burial PNT-004 was interred under a low platform associated with the third version of the Lost World Pyramid (5C-54). It was deposited near the bedrock 1.3 metres (4.3 ft) under the platform without any funerary offerings. The remains are those of a young adult male between 21 and 35 years old who was laid on his right hand side in a flexed position with an east–west orientation, with the head lying to the west. The remains were associated with three pieces of worked stone that had traces of stucco and red paint. The burial has been dated to around 300 BC.

Burial PNT-032 may have been a dedicatory offering upon construction of the fourth version of the Lost World Pyramid (5C-54). It was buried at a depth of 0.75 metres (2.5 ft) without associated offerings. The remains were probably those of a female; she was lying face down and oriented north–south with the head pointing northwards. The remains were very poorly preserved but probably date to the early 1st century AD.
