= Chan Chich site =

Mayan archaeological site in Belize

Chan Chich is an archaeological site of a moderately sized ancient Maya city located approximately 4.25 km east of the Belizean border with Guatemala and siting along Chan Chich Creek in the Three Rivers adaptive region of Belize. The site was occupied from the beginning of the Middle Pre-Classic era (around 800 BC) through the Terminal Classic era (around 850 AD). The Chan Chich Archaeological Project (CCAP) and the Belize Estates Archaeological Survey Team (BEAST) sought to survey and excavate the site in years that dates back to as early as the 1990s which found a Terminal Neoclassic Tomb. The most recent investigation which yielded more findings came in the year 2014, with goals to examine the site and reconstruct an accurate model and map for it.

== Excavations and interpretations ==
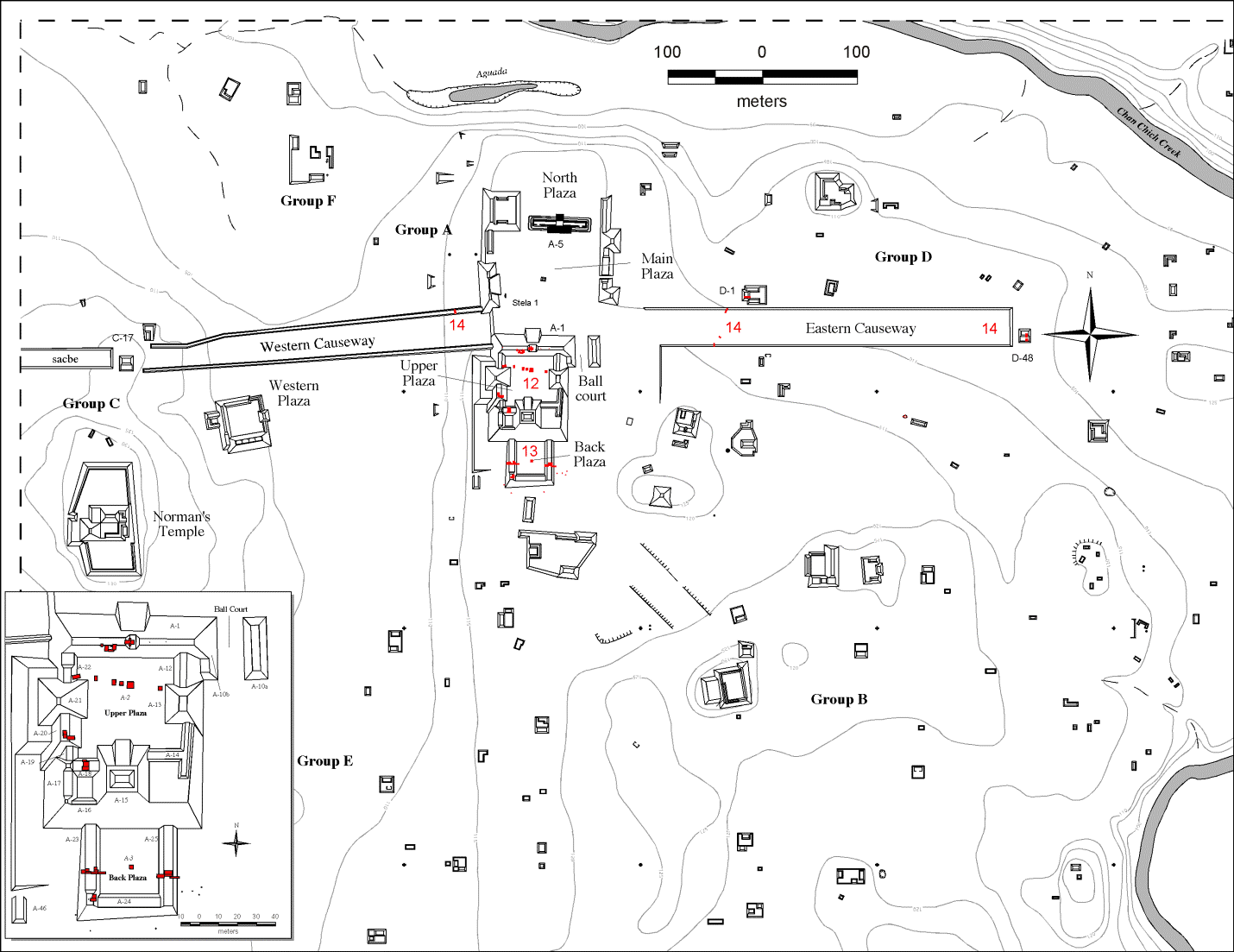
Chan Chich Site map

=== 1990s excavation overview ===
In the 1990s, the Chan Chich Dynastic Architecture Project (CCDAP) was established to initiate an excavation party for the site of Chan Chich. Excavations in the Upper Plaza is essential in showcasing the Maya kings and their important relationship with other architecture and artifacts found there. One of the most important findings was the tomb of a Terminal Pre-Classic king found during the late 1990s. Archaeologists dug in the Upper Plaza and found the tomb buried beneath a small shrine platform. Results concluded that the king was one of the earliest Maya kings of the eastern Maya lowlands. There is an important relationship Mayan monumental architecture and the kings during the Classic period, but there lacks sufficient evidence to conclude the relationship between the earliest of Maya kings and buildings.

=== 2014 excavation locations ===
==== Structure A-15 ====
Source Filmmaker Software (SfM) uses correlation and set algorithms in conjunction with the 1,799 pictures of Structure A-15 (located in the Upper Plaza) to create a 3D model of Structure A-15. This model is helpful in visualizing data and making it easier for archaeological analysis. While physical artifacts was not found in Structure A-15, the model was able to visualize certain features like the five looters' trenches/tunnels. A full analysis of the area is currently incomplete.

==== Structure A-18 ====
Adjacent to the northwest corner of Structure A-15 is the small point known as Structure A-18. A large room with an off-centered doorway was discovered facing south of the courtyard. Inside includes a skeletal remain of an individual, yet no artifacts were extracted at that time.

==== Structure A-1 ====
Structure A-1 is the largest structure at Chan Chich, consisting of two tandem range buildings both with four rooms on both sides. Located in the middle of the two tandem buildings lies a penultimate phase floor, which was discovered when archaeologists dug beneath the central landing. "Inside the cut was Cache CC-C01, consisting of 17 obsidian blades, and a crudely constructed crypt containing the remains of a single human interment (Burial CC-B11) and four complete Achote Group ceramic vessels, ceramic sherds, lithic flakes, three obsidian microblades, and a small piece of pink shell."

==== Courtyard A-3 ====
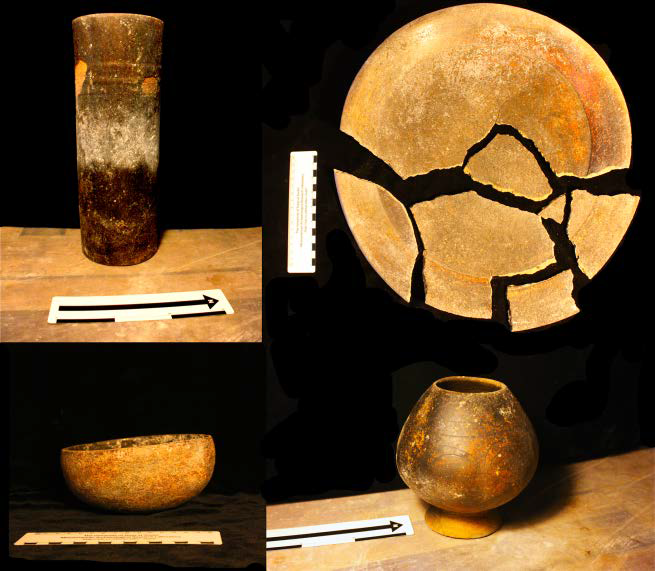
Chan Chich vessels from Courtyard A-3

While the other structures were examined before in previous excavations, courtyard A-3 remained untouched until the 2014 excavation. This large courtyard, located south of the Upper Plaza, contains Structures A-23, A-24, and A-25. Examination of the site concluded that the courtyard was occupied in the Late Classic Period through the Terminal Classic period. Structure A-23 contains additional knives that archaeologists believe to have been constructed by using deer bone, ground stones, and broken bifaces as materials. The analysis of structure A-25 and the artifacts found there is unfinished, and information about the location will remain unclear until future excavation of the site is to be held.

== Future plans ==
The main goal of the 2014 excavation was to examine the site, mark down its details, and construct an accurate model of the site. The CCAP marked that their expedition as a great success, and plan to examine other aspects of the site such as examining architectural features more in depth and accessing the relationship between them and Maya royalty.
