= Maya monarchs =

Centers of power for the Maya civilization

Maya monarchs, also known as Maya kings and queens, were the centers of power for the Maya civilization. Each Maya city-state was controlled by a dynasty of kings. The position of king was usually inherited by the oldest son.

== Symbols of power ==
Maya kings felt the need to legitimize their claim to power. One of the ways to do this was to build a temple or pyramid. Tikal Temple I is a good example. This temple was built during the reign of Yikʼin Chan Kʼawiil. Another king named Kʼinich Janaabʼ Pakal would later carry out this same show of power when building the Temple of Inscriptions at Palenque. The Temple of Inscriptions still towers today amid the ruins of Palenque, as the supreme symbol of influence and power in Palenque.

== Succession ==
Maya kings cultivated godlike personas. When a ruler died and left no heir to the throne, the result was usually war and bloodshed. King Pacal's precursor, Pacal the Elder ("I"), died upon the battlefield. However, instead of the kingdom erupting into chaos, the city of Palenque, a Maya capital city in southern Mexico, invited in a young prince from a different city-state. The prince was only twelve years old.

== Expansion ==
Pacal and his predecessors not only built elaborate temples and pyramids. They expanded their city-state into a thriving empire. Under Yikʼin Chan Kʼawiil, Tikal conquered Calakmul and the other cities around Tikal, forming what could be referred to as a super city-state. Pacal achieved in creating a major center for power and development.

== Responsibilities ==
A Maya king was expected to be an excellent military leader. He would often carry out raids against rival city-states. The Maya kings also offered their own blood to the gods. The rulers were also expected to have a good mind to solve problems that the city might be facing, including war and food crises.

Maya kings were expected to ensure the gods received the prayers, praise and attention they deserved and to reinforce their divine lineage. They did this by displaying public rituals such as processions through the streets of their cities. A more private ritual was that of blood sacrifice, which was done by Lords and their wives.

== Known rulers of Mayan city-states in the Classic Period ==
Notes:
- All dates AD; if otherwise, it is stated.
- The lists may not be completed. However, take in consideration that some lists are more completed than others in different aspects.
- English language names are provisional nicknames based on their identifying glyphs, where rulers' Maya language names have not yet been definitively deciphered phonetically.

=== Aguacatal (Yokel), Petén ===
- 751: Unik K'inich

=== Aguas Calientes ===
- c.790: Chak Lakamtuun

=== Aguateca ===
- ?_770: Uchaʼan Kʼan Bʼalam – father of Tan Te' Kinich, ruled in the 8th century AD.
- 770_c.802: Tan Teʼ Kʼinich – son of Uchaʼan Kʼan Bʼalam

=== Altun Ha ===
- 4 December 584ʼ?: Til Man K'inich

=== La Amelia ===
Name/Glyph	Image	Born	Reigned from	Reigned until	Death	Consort (s)	Monuments	Notes
La Amelia dynasty
Ajaw Bot Kʼahkʼ Hoplaj Chan Kʼawiil (Lachan K'awiil Ajaw Bot)		25 June 760	1 May 802	After 804		?	Panels 1 and 2; Hieroglyphic Stairway 1	In 802, conducted a ritual supervised by king Tan Teʼ Kʼinich of Aguateca.

=== Bonampak ===
Name/Glyph	Image	Born	Reigned from	Reigned until	Death	Consort (s)	Monuments	Notes
Bonampak dynasty
Aj Yash Punim		?	c.400		?	?		Founder of the ruling dynasty.
Ruler of Stela 7		?	554	600	600; Bonampak	?	Stela 7	
Jasaw Chan Muwaan I		? Son of Ruler of Stela 7	600	605	605; Bonampak	?		
Aj Olnal		? Son of Jasaw Chan Muwaan I	605 611 (restored)	610 (deposed) after 614	After 614; Bonampak	?		
Aj Chan Tok'		?	610	611	?	?		Usurper, expelled Aj Olnal, but he returned the next year.
Winakhab Tok'		?	643	After 648	After 648; Bonampak	?		
Unknown ruler		?	Before 658	After 670	After 670; Bonampak	?		
Aj Nak'ey		?	683	After 692	After 692; Bonampak	?		
Knot-Eye Bahlam		?	732	c.747	c.747 Bonampak	?		
Aj Sak Telech		?	747	776	776; Bonampak	Lady Shield Skull at least one child		
Jasaw Chan Muwaan II		? Son of Aj Sak Teleh and Lady Shield Skull	776	795	795; Bonampak	Lady Green Rabbit of Yaxchilan	Panel 1 (12 Jan 787); Panel 2 (4 Jan 787); Panel 3 (12 Jan 787); Stelae 1, 2 and 3; Temple 1	Last known ruler of the city.

=== Calakmul ===
The kings of Calakmul-Dzibanche were known as k'uhul Kaanu'l ajaw (/k’uːˈχuːl kän äχäˈwoɓ/) ("Divine Lords of the Snake Kingdom"). This list is not continuous, as the archaeological record is incomplete. All dates AD.

Name/Glyph	Image	Born	Reigned from	Reigned until	Death	Consort (s)	Monuments	Notes
Bat dynasty
Ruler with unknown name		?	4th century		?	?	Stela 114	
Chan Yopaat			426?	c.435		?	Stela 114	
Chan Ek'		?	?	c.514		? Calakmul	Stela 43	He declares himself "k'uhul Chatahn winik", sacred man of Chatahn)
Yuknoom Head (Cauac Head)		? Dzibanche (Third?) son of Uk'ay Kaan and Lady Scroll-in-Hand	630	636	?	?	Stela 76 (633); Stela 78 (633)	Probably resided in Calakmul. Maybe the pre-accession name of Yuknoom Chʼeen II. Defeated his rival to the throne Waxaklajuun Ubaah Kaan 4 of April 636.
Yuknoom Chʼeen II the Great		11 September 600 (9.8.7.2.17); Dzibanche (Third? Fourth?) son of Uk'ay Kaan and Lady Scroll-in-Hand	28 April 636 (9.10.3.5.10)	686	686; Calakmul (aged 85/86)	? at least three children	Stela 33 (16 Set 657); Stela 35 (27 Mar 661); Stelae 9, 75 and 79 (29 Jun 672); Stelae 115 and 116 (8 May 682); Stelae 13, 30?, 31, 32?, 34?, 36, 37?, 77?, 85?, 86, 87?, 93 and 94	Brought Calakmul to the height of its power, winning over Tikal in two occasions: 657 and 679. His daughter married a lord from La Corona.
Yuknoom Yichʼaak Kʼahkʼ (Jaguar Paw Smoke)		6 October 649 (9.10.16.16.19); Son of Yuknoom Chʼeen II	3 April 686 (9.12.13.17.7)	31 March 698	31 March 698 (9.13.6.2.9); Calakmul(?) (aged 48)	Lady of Stela 116 at least one child		Defeated by Tikal in 695.
Wi'? Kab' Ta (Split Earth)		?	c.695		?	?		Probably a co-ruler.
Yuknoom Tookʼ Kʼawiil (Ruler 5, 6 or 7)		? Son of Yuknoom Yichʼaak Kʼahkʼ	26 January 702 (9.13.10.0.0)	c.736	c.736 Calakmul	Lady of Stela 54 possibly three children	Stelae 23 and 24 (24 Jun 702); Stela 51 (731); Stela 52 (731); Stela 54 (731); Stelae 1, 7?, 8, 23, 24, 38, 39?, 40, 41?, 42?, 53, 55, 70, 71, 72, 73, 74 and 89	His daughter married a lord from La Corona. Defeated by Tikal in 736.
Wamaw Kʼawiil		? Son (possibly) of Yuknoom Tookʼ Kʼawiil and Lady of Stela 54	c.736		?	? at least one child		
Bolon Kʼawiil I (Ruler 8, Ruler Y)		? Calakmul; Son of Wamaw Kʼawiil	c.741		?	?	Stelae 25, 26, 27, 59 and 60	
Yax Chit K’ahk’ Jal? Witz' Naah Chan/Kan (Great Serpent, Ruler 9, Ruler Z)		?	c.751		?	Lady of Stela 88	Stela 88 (751); Stelae 62 (unfinished) and 68	
Bolon Kʼawiil II (Ruler 9)		?	c.771	c.789	c.789 Calakmul	?	Stela 57 (771); Stela 58 (771)	
Chan Pet		?	c.849		?	?		
Aj Took		?	c.909		?	?	Stela 61	Last known ruler of the city.

=== Cancuén ===
Name	Ruled	Notes
Tayal Chan K'inich	c. 415	This king erected a stela at Tres Islas. He used what would later become the Cancuén Emblem Glyph. He likely ruled from El Raudal.
K’ihnich Pak’ Ne[h]el Ahk	¿? - May 23, 653.	
K'iib' Ajaw	657 – 682	Vassal of Calakmul
Itzam Chan Ahk Wi’ Taak Kay	682 – 685	Vassal of Calakmul
Ix(ik) Jun Yej Winkil K'awiil	720-740	
Tajal Chan Ahk	757 – c. 799	Became independent from Dos Pilas in 761. Expanded the city palace in 767.
Kan Maax	c.800	

=== Caracol ===
Name/Glyph	Image	Born	Reigned from	Reigned until	Death	Consort (s)	Monuments	Notes
Caracol dynasty
Teʼ Kʼab Chaak (Tree Branch Rain God)		?	331	349	349; Caracol	?		Founder of the dynasty, or at least the first recorded ruler of the city. Yet is only known from two Late Classic back dated texts. One places him at AD 331, and the second at AD 349.
No traces of the dynasty have been found between 350 and 400.
K'inich Tzu'[b] Tz'i'h (K'inich Tz'uutz')			400				Stela 20 (AD 400)	This is the ruler who erected the oldest know stela at the site, in AD 400.
No traces of the dynasty have found between 400 and 470.
Kʼahkʼ Ujol Kʼinich I (Smoking Skull I; Ruler I)		?	c.470		? Caracol	A lady of Xultun at least one child		Appears on the 6th century genealogical text of Stela 16, but his place in the line of reigning lords is unknown. His reign has been estimated to be circa AD 470. He may have been the father of Yajaw Te’ K’inich I.
Yajaw Teʼ Kʼinich [Tzu'(b) Tz'i'h] I (YajawTe' K'inich Tz'uutz' I )		? Caracol; Probable son of Kʼahkʼ Ujol Kʼinich I and a lady of Xultun	12 April 484 (9.2.9.0.16)	514	514; Caracol	? at least one child	Altar 4 (28 Jan 495); Altar 19 (7 Dec 504); Stela 13 (16 Oct 514); Altar 17 (16 Oct 514)	Stela 13 records his celebration of the 4th K’atun in AD 514.
[Tu]tum [Y]ohl K'inich Tzu'Tz'ih I' (K'an I; Lord Jaguar; Antenna Top I; Ruler II)		? Caracol; Son of Yajaw Teʼ Kʼinich I	13 April 531 (9.4.16.13.3)	534	534; Caracol	Lady Kʼal Kʼinich at least two children	Stela 16 (3 Jul 534); Altars 3 and 14 (3 Jul 534)	Stela 16 text gives his parentage statement, and tells that his accession was overseen by a ‘higher authority,’ either another lord or a divine being.
Yajaw Teʼ Kʼinich Tzu'[b]Tz'i'h II (Lord Water; Lord Muluc; Ruler III)		? Caracol; Son of Kʼan I and Lady Kʼal Kʼinich	18 April 553 (9.5.19.1.2)	599	c.603 Caracol	Lady 1 at least one child Lady Batzʼ Ekʼ [of La Corona?] 582 at least one child	Stela 14 (20 Mar 554); Altar 5 (20 Mar 554); Stela 15 (5 Dec 573); Altar 6 (5 Dec 573); Stela 4 (17 Oct 583); Stela 1 (22 Aug 593); Altar 1 (22 Aug 593)	Named after his grandfather. His first monument, Stela 14, records the K’atun ending in AD 554 (9.6.0.0.0). As told on Altar 21, Yajaw Te’ K’inich II's accession takes place under the auspices of the Tikal Lord Wak Chan K’awiil. He erected Stela 1 and Altar 1 to mark his last K’atun ending of 9.8.0.0.0, and four years later he is referenced as ‘seeing’ the 9.8.10.0.0 ending. He is mentioned in the fragmentary text on Stela 23. In AD 562 – 9.6.8.4.2 he enacted the first recorded star war against Tikal and Lord Wak Chan K’awiil. Yajaw Te' K'inich II's two sons, Knot Ajaw and K’an II, rule after him.
Saak? Ti' Huun (Knot Ajaw; Ajaw Serpent; Flaming Ajaw; Ruler IV)		28 November 575 (9.7.2.0.3); Caracol; Son of Yajaw Teʼ Kʼinich II and Lady 1	24 June 599 (9.8.5.16.12)	613	613; Caracol (aged 37/38)	Unmarried	Stela 6 (2 Jul 603); Stela 5 (10 May 613); Altars 11 and 15 (10 May 613)	Erected his monuments to the west of Structure A13.
Tutum Yohl K’inich Tzu'Tz'i'h II (K'an II; Lord Stormwater Moon; Antenna Top II; Ruler V)		18 April 588 (9.7.14.10.8); Caracol; Son of Yajaw Teʼ Kʼinich II and Lady Batzʼ Ekʼ	6 March 618 (9.9.4.16.2)	21 July 658	21 July 658 (9.11.5.15.9); Caracol (aged 70)	? at least one child	Stela 22 (25 Jan 633); Stela 7 (26 Jan 633); Altar 21 (26 Jan 633); Altar 17 (12 Oct 652); Stela 3 (13 Oct 652); Hieroglyphic Stairway of Naranjo (possibly); Panel 1 of Naranjo (possibly)	The most successful Caracol ruler. Reigning for 40 years, he expanded the causeway system and saw an increase in the site's population. Born as Sak Witzil Baah (“White First Hill”, or “White Gopher Hill”) in AD 588, he took his grandfather's name at his accession. He was the half-brother of Saak Ti' Huun (Knot Ajaw), and was thus always stressing his legitimacy by referencing his mother, who must be Ix Tiwool Chan Ek' (Batz’ Ek’). It is interesting that he never references the rule of his brother Knot Ajaw in any of his monuments, even those that describe his dynastic predecessors. He also seems to have developed diplomatic contacts with the Snake polity, with whom he coordinated the war with Naranjo, which began in 626, and ended with the defeat of Naranjo in 631.
Kʼahkʼ Ujol Kʼinich II (Smoking Skull II; Ruler VI)		? Caracol; Possible son of Kʼan II	22 June 658 (9.11.5.14.0)	2 March 680	2 March 680 (9.12.7.14.1); Caracol	?	A monument at La Rejolla; Two stucco texts at Caana (Structures B16-sub and B18)	Succeeded K’an II in 658, but as he has no surviving parentage statements, we cannot be certain that he is K’an II's son. One of the stucco texts shows that in 680, Caracol was the victim of a star war from Naranjo (also called Naranjo's war of Independence). Martin and Grube suggest that this action drove K’ahk’ Ujol K’inich from Caracol, at which time he may have fled to La Rejolla, 12 km to the northwest. The remainder of this text has not been excavated. This star war event seems to have launched Caracol's epigraphic hiatus, which continues for 96 years, until 798.
Tz'ayaj K'ajk'? (Ruler VII)		? Caracol	c.700		? Caracol	?	Stela 21 (24 Jan 702)	Reigned during the epigraphic hiatus. One candidate for this ruler comes from Naj Tunich, some 46 km to the south. In one of the cave's chambers dated to 692 is a text referring to a Caracol elite named Tz’ayaj K’ajk’, who carries the emblem glyph, but not the k’inich ajaw prefix.
Tutum Yohl K'inich (Ruler VIII)		? Caracol	c.744	c.793	? Caracol	? at least one son		He is as enigmatic as Ruler VII. He likewise appears in Naj Tunich, and also lacks the k’inich ajaw prefix, leaving his royal status in question. In this text (dated to 27 August 744), he performs a fire-bearing ritual under the supervision of a lord of Ixkun; an unnamed lord of Calakmul is also involved. All other appearances of his name occur in later retrospective texts like Altar 23, which lists him as a 3 K’atun lord, and the captor of two lords from Ucanal and Bital.
K’inich Joy K’awiil		? Caracol; Possible son of Tum Yohl Kʼinich	10 December 799 (9.18.9.5.9)	?	? Caracol	?	Altar 23 (17 Aug 800); B-Group Ballcourt	Began a revival of the Caracol polity with his accession. He commissioned the B-Group Ballcourt, the markers of which date back to the dynastic founder Te’ K’ab Chaak. Stela 11 shows Tutum Yohl K’inich in an ambiguous relationship to Joy K’awiil, which may show that he is the latter's father, or as suggested by Altar 23 potentially a relative in a high-ranking military position.
K'inich Yuhkbil Yopaat (K'inich Toob'il Yopaat; Ruler X or XI)		? Caracol; Possible son of Tum Yohl K'inich	c.810	c.830	? Caracol	?	Stelae 8 and 18 (26 Jun 810); Altar 22 (26 Jun 810); Stela 19 (4 May 820); Altars 12 and 13 (4 May 820)	His accession date is not certain, but he erected five (possibly six) monuments (Stelae 18, 19, Altars 12, 13), and seems to have repaired relations with Ucanal. This new relationship is depicted on Altars 12 and 13, as well as on stucco text from Structure B18.
Tun [Y]ohl K'inich (Kan III )		? Caracol	c.835	c.849	? Caracol	?	Stela 17 (28 Nov 849); Altars 10 and 18 (28 Nov 849)	
K'inich ?-?-? (Ruler XIII )		? Caracol	c.859		? Caracol	?	Stela 10 (7 Oct 859)	Last known lord of Caracol, and erected only one monument: Stela 10. Stela 10 is a carved all glyphic monument which may commemorate the half-K’atun 10.1.10.0.0 (AD 859).

=== El Cayo ===
- Aj Chak Wayab' K'utim
- Chan Panak' Wayib
- Aj Chak Suutz' K'utiim

=== Chinikiha ===
- K’inich B’ah Tok'
- Aj Tok' Ti'

=== Cobá ===
Name/Glyph	Image	Born	Reigned from	Reigned until	Death	Consort (s)	Monuments	Notes
1st Cobá dynasty
Yu’npik Tok’		?	c.500		?	?		Founder of the ruling family, which lasted in power until 780.
Three unknown rulers
2nd Cobá dynasty / Snake dynasty
Ix Ch'ak Ch'een		? Dzibanche? Probable daughter of Yax Yopaat, king of Dzibanche or Calakmul	? (before 12 May 569)	? (after 8 Dec. 573)	?	c.565? at least one child	Stela 29 (9 Nov. 578 or 23 Oct 650)	She was called "Ch'een" or "Ch'en Nal" or "Che'enal" until 2025, when her name, "Ch'ak Ch'een", was revealed. In October 2025 it was announced that researchers deciphered this lady's name among the 123 panels of a 14-by-11-foot limestone “Foundation Rock” beneath a staircase near the Nohoch Mul pyramid. Her name was mentioned in connection with the establishment of the office of kaloomte on 12 May 569 and with the completion of a ball court on 8 Dec. 573. She was probably a princess of Dzibanche. She had a superior title than her husband (she was called kaloomte). Probably abdicated to her husband, who starts his reign in 574.
Kʼahk Bahlam		?	21 September 574 (9.7.0.14.10)	c.610	c.610? Cobá	c.565? at least one child	Stelae 26, 28 and 30	
Sihyaj Chan Kʼawiil (Ruler A)		? Cobá; Son of K'ahk Bahlam and Lady Che'enal [of Dzibanche/Calakmul]	c.610	632	c.632 Cobá	Lady of Stela 3 at least one child	Stela 6 (19 Mar 623); Stela 3 (25 Jan 633)	
Xaman K’awiil		? Cobá; Son of Sihyaj Chan Kʼawiil and Lady of Stela 3	16 March 632 (9.9.19.2.3)	640	640; Cobá	? one child?		
Kʼawiil Ekʼ (Lady K’awiil Ajaw; Ruler B)		617; Cobá; Daughter of Sihyaj Chan K'awiil and Lady of Stela 3, or of Xaman K’awiil	7 April 640 (9.10.7.5.9)	682	682; Cobá (aged 64/65)	? at least one child	Stela 2 (4 Dec 642); Stela 4 (12 Oct 652); Stela 1 (29 Jan 653/29 Jun 672); Stela 5 (21 Aug 662)	She bore the title kaloomte' ('superior warrior'), which was a very high title in contemporary Maya culture, and not worn by all rulers. She is depicted presiding over, or treading upon, over a dozen captives under her feet, a larger number than any other Maya queen, and more than almost any other Maya king. Her reign took place during a period of golden age of Coba, with political continuity, economic prosperity, and expansionistic, militaristic power, and not a vassal of Calakmul.
Chan Yopaat (Chan Kʼawiil; Ruler C)		? Cobá; Son of Kʼawiil Ekʼ	28 August 682 (9.12.10.5.12)	692	692; Cobá	? at least one child	Stela 1 (28 Aug 682)	
Mat Kʼawiil		? Cobá; Son of Chan Yopaat	c.692	c.711	c.711? Cobá	?	Stela 1	
Unknown rulers
Chan Kʼinich (Ruler C or D)		? Cobá; Probably a descendant of his predecessors	16 January 773 (9.17.2.0.5)	c.780	c.780? Cobá	?	Stela 20 (16 Jan 773/30 Nov 780)	
Ruler E	? (Nothing else is known or certain besides their name)							Discovered in 2020, ruled Cobá in the period 500-780. Some of these may have ruled between Yu’npik Tok’ and Che'enal.
Kʼahk Chitam	? (Nothing else is known or certain besides their name)							Discovered in 2020, ruled Cobá in the period 500-780. Some of these may have ruled between Yu’npik Tok’ and Che'enal.
Uxman K’awiil	? (Nothing else is known or certain besides their name)							Discovered in 2020, ruled Cobá in the period 500-780. Some of these may have ruled between Yu’npik Tok’ and Che'enal.
Yopaat Taj Naaj	? (Nothing else is known or certain besides their name)							Discovered in 2020, ruled Cobá in the period 500-780. Some of these may have ruled between Yu’npik Tok’ and Che'enal.
Lady Yopaat	? (Nothing else is known or certain besides their name)							Discovered in 2020, ruled Cobá in the period 500-780. Some of these may have ruled between Yu’npik Tok’ and Che'enal.
K’ahk’ Yopaat	? (Nothing else is known or certain besides their name)							Discovered in 2020, ruled Cobá in the period 500-780. Some of these may have ruled between Yu’npik Tok’ and Che'enal.
Kʼaloomte	? (Nothing else is known or certain besides their name)							Discovered in 2020, ruled Cobá in the period 500-780. Some of these may have ruled between Yu’npik Tok’ and Che'enal.

=== Comalcalco ===
- ?-649: Ox Balam

=== Copán ===
(Note:Despite the sparse references to previous rulers in Copán, the first safe reference is from 426. All the rulers, with the exception of the last one, appear in the called Altar Q.)

Name/Glyph	Image	Born	Reigned from	Reigned until	Death	Consort (s)	Monuments	Notes
Copán dynasty
Kʼinich Yax Kʼukʼ Moʼ (Great Sun; Quetzal Macaw)		c.380/390? Tikal	426	437	437; Copán (aged around 47/57?)	? at least one child	Hunal tomb in Temple 16	Came from Tikal. Founder of Copán lineage, he also founded Quirigua's by installing there the first king, Tok Ch'ich'.
Kʼinich Yax Tzu'[b]Tz'i'h Tok K'ik' (K'inich Tz'uutz', K'inich Popol Hol, Mat Head, Great Sun)		c.415 Copán; Son of Kʼinich Yax Kʼukʼ Moʼ	437	470	c.470 Copán (aged around 54/55?)	?	Stelae 18 & 63; Motmot capstone; Xukpi Stone	Co-ruler with his father since 430, as he was shown in Structure 10L-26, dated to 9 December 435. Founded the institutions of the city.
K'ahk'-?-Ajaw? (Ruler 3)		?	c.455	c.465?	c.465? Copán	?		Identifiable with Ruler 3. It has recently been discovered that the inscription on Stela 46 indicates that he is the son of K'inich Tz'utz'ih Tok K'ik'/Ruler 2.
K'al Tuun Hix (Tuun K'ab' Hix; Kʼaltuun Hix; Ku Ix; Ruler 4)		?	c.470?	476	c.476 Copán	?	Stela 34; Papagayo Step; CPN 584	Co-ruler since 465.
Yuhkua' (Yu-? [ku?]-a; Ruler 5)		?	c.475?		?	?		
Uh Chan Ahk (Muyal Jol, Ruler 6)		?	c.485?	504	c.504 Copán	?		
Bʼalam Nehn (Mirror Jaguar; Waterlily Jaguar)		?	504	524 or 544	524 or 544; Copán	? at least one child	Stela 15 (524); Ante Step; Stela 16 of Caracol (possibly); Stela E of Quirigua	
Wil Ohl Kʼinich Taj Waybi (Head on Earth; Ruler 8)		? Copán; Son of Bʼalam Nehnn	532	551	551; Copán	?	Stela E (11 May 544)	If Bahlam Nehn ruled until 544, Wil Ohl K'inich was a co-ruler until the former's death.
Sak-Lu (Ruler 9)		? Copán; Son of Wil Ohl Kʼinich	551	553	553; Copán	?	A step of the Hieroglyphic Stairway	
K'inich O? Tzi-B'alam (Moon Jaguar; Ruler 10)		? Copán; Son of Bʼalam Nehn	26 May 553 (9.5.19.3.0)	22 October 578	22 October 578 (9.7.4.17.4); Copán	?	Stela 17 (554); Stela 9 (564); Rosalila Step	
Kʼakʼ Ti' Chan Yopaat (Butz' Chan; Smoke Serpent)		564? Copán	15 November 578 (9.7.5.0.8)	23 January 628	23 January 628 (9.9.14.16.9); Copán (aged around 64?)	? at least one child	Stela 7 (10 May 613); Stela P (623); Stela 5 (4 Oct 627); Altars Y? & X?	
K'ahk' Uti' Witz' Kʼawiil (Chan Imix K'awiil; Smoke Jaguar; Smoke Imix)		14 November 604 (9.7.5.0.8) or 612; Copán; Possible son of Kʼakʼ Chan Yopaat	8 or 21 February 628	18 June 695	18 June 695 (9.13.3.5.7); Copán (aged 78/79 or 90)	? at least one child	Stela 2 (652); Stela 3 (652); Stela 10 (652); Stela 12 (652); Stela 13 (652); Stela 19 (19 Aug 652); Stelae 1, 5, 6, 23; Altars H', I', K & 5; Burial in Temple 26	Probably the longest-reigning ruler of the city.
Uaxaclajuun Ubʼaah Kʼawiil (Oxwitik; 18 Rabbit)		675; Copán; Possible son of Chan Imix Kʼawiil	2 January or 15 June 695	3 May 738	3 May 738 (9.15.6.14.6.); Quiriguá (aged 62/63)	? at least one child	Stela J (7 Jul 695); Stela F (13 Oct 721); Stela 4 (17 Sep 726); Stela H (5 Dec 730); Stela A (19 Oct 731); Stela D (24 Jul 736); Stelae B, C, F, G, Altar S; Lower Hieroglyphic Stairway of Temple 26; Step of Temple 22; Ballcourt AIIb markers; Ballcourt A-III text & markers	If ascended on 2 January, he briefly co-ruled with his predecessor. He was captured and beheaded by the ruler of Quirigua.
Kʼakʼ Hoplaj Chan Kʼawiil (Smoke Monkey)		? Copán	11 June 738 (9.15.6.16.5)	4 February 749	4 February 749 (9.15.17.12.16); Copán	? at least one child		
Kʼakʼ Yipyaj Chan Kʼawiil (Smoke Shell; Smoke Squirrel)		? Son of Kʼakʼ Joplaj Chan Kʼawiil	4 February 749 (9.15.17.12.16)	c.761 or January 763	c.761 or January 763; Copán	A lady from Palenque at least one child	Stela M (756); Stela N (761); Upper Hieroglyphic Stairway of Temple 26; Temple 26 text.; Burial in Temple 11 (probably)	
Yax Pasaj Chan Yopaat (Yax Pasah, Yax Pac; Rising Sun)		? Copán; Son of Kʼakʼ Yipyaj Chan Kʼawiil	2 July 763	c.810	c.810 Copán		Stelae 8 & 29; Altars G, G2, G3, Q, R, T, U, V, Z, B', C', D', F', G', W', J?, 41; CPNs 157, 244, 19119, 19222, 19469, 23748, 2843 and 26300; Temple 22a Stone; Temple 11 Wall Panels, Step & Reviewing Stand; Temple 18 Door jamb and Wall Texts; Temple 21a Bench; 9N-82, Harvard and Tegucigalpa Benches, House Models from Structures 29 & 33; Various incense burners.; Burial in Temple 18	
Ukit Took (Ucit Tok)		?	6 or 10 February 822	c.830	c.830 (or after)	?	Stela 11 (4 May 820); Altar L (unfinished)	Last known ruler of Copán, and the only who doesn't appear on the mentioned Altar Q. The city collapsed suddenly, possibly under an epidemic.

=== La Corona ===
- c.520-544: Chak Took Ichʼaak
- c.658: Chak Naahb Kaan
- 667-679: Kʼinich Yook
- ?: Chak Ak'aach Took
- c.721: Yajaw Teʼ Kʼinich

=== Dos Pilas ===
Name/Glyph	Image	Born	Reigned from	Reigned until	Death	Consort (s)	Monuments	Notes
Tikal-Dos Pilas dynasty
Bʼalaj Chan Kʼawiil (Ruler 1; Flint Sky; Flint Sky God K; Lightning Sky; Malah Chan Kʼawill)		15 October 625 (9.9.12.11.2); Tikal; Son of Kʼinich Muwaan Jol II, King of Tikal	31 October 643 (9.10.10.16.9)	692	c.692 Dos Pilas (aged 66/67)	Lady of Itzan at least two children Lady Buluʼ at least one child		He probably saw himself as the legitimate heir to the Tikal throne. However, moved away from the capital to found a new one at Dos Pilas, which grew to become a rival kingdom, under overlordship of Calakmul. One of his children was Lady Wak Chanil Ajaw, queen regnant Naranjo, who, by using the Tikal emblem, proved her ascendance, through Bʼalaj Chan Kʼawiil, from Tikal royal line.
Kokaj Bʼalam (Itzamnaaj B'alam; Shield Jaguar)		? Dos Pilas; Son of Bʼalaj Chan Kʼawiil and Lady of Itzan	c.695		? Dos Pilas	?		Little is known about him. He probably had a short reign.
Kokaj Kʼawiil (Itzamnaaj K'awiil; Ruler 2; Shield God K)		25 January 673 (9.12.0.10.11); Dos Pilas; Son of B'alaj Chan Kʼawiil and Lady of Itzan	24 March 698 (9.13.6.2.0)	22 October 726	22 October 726 (9.14.15.1.19); Dos Pilas (aged 53)	? at least one child	Tomb under Structure L5-1	
...?in Ti' K'awiil (Ucha'an K'in B'alam; Ruler 3; Master of the Sun Jaguar; Scroll-head God K; Spangle-head; Jewelled-head)		?	10 January 727 (9.14.15.5.15)	28 May 741	28 May 741 (9.15.9.16.11); Dos Pilas	Lady GI-Kʼawiil of Cancuén no children?	Stela 3 (736); Stela 16 (736); Stela 5	Has no apparent family relation to his predecessors, being probably a regent. It is known that, twenty years earlier, he was already a prominent figure in the kingdom (being responsible, for example, for the capture of the lord of Tikal in 705, or involving himself closely in rituals performed by the previous king). As a ruler (regent or usurper) he provided strong leadership. Erected monuments in Dos Pilas and Aguateca.
Kʼawiil Chan Kʼinich (Ruler 4; God K Sky Mahkʼina)		Before 726; Dos Pilas; Son of Itzamnaaj Kʼawiil	23 June 741 (9.15.9.17.17)	c.761	After 761	?	Panel 19	He was forced to flee from Dos Pilas in 761 and was never mentioned again. As a result, the date of his death is currently unknown.

=== Dzibanche ===
The kings of Calakmul-Dzibanche were known as k'uhul kaan ajawob (/k’uːˈχuːl kän äχäˈwoɓ/) ("Divine Lords of the Snake Kingdom"). This list is not continuous, as the archaeological record is incomplete. All dates AD.

Name/Glyph	Image	Born	Reigned from	Reigned until	Death	Consort (s)	Monuments	Notes
Snake dynasty
Chak Yak? Ixiim?		?	c.322/329	c.374/381	?	?	Plaza Pom miniature stela	Founder of the dynasty, or at least the first recorded ruler of the city.
Taaj Yohl Bahlam		? Dzibanche	c.374/381	c.402?	c.402 Dzibanche	?		Probably co-ruled for a time with previous ruler.
Yuknoom Chʼeen I		? Dzibanche	c.402	c.455	c.455 Dzibanche	?	Monument 18 (416 or 428); Monuments 13 and 22 (438); Monument 15 (445); Monument 11 (442 or 452-454)	Consolidated Dzibanche's power over its periphery, taking as many as 16 captives.
Yukno'm Jom? Chan Kaanal			October 24, 455	¿?				
Yuknoom...?...K'ahk'			464	?				
Yuknoom Ek' Ti Chan			479	?				
Tuun Kʼabʼ Hix (Ku Ix; Kʼaltuun Hix; Bound-Stone Jaguar)		? Dzibanche	c.520	c.546	c.546 Dzibanche	Lady Ek' Naah at least one child		Orchestrated initial expansion over the Maya lowlands. His daughter married a lord from La Corona.
Kʼahkʼ Tiʼ Chiʼchʼ Aj Saakil		? Dzibanche	550	568	568; Dzibanche	?		Probably resided in Dzibanche and oversaw the military operations and political activities of Sky Witness.
Yukno'm Jo'm?Uhut Chan K'ahk' B'alam (Sky Witness)		? Dzibanche; Possible son of Tuun Kʼabʼ Hix and Lady Ekʼ Naah	561	572	572; Dzibanche	? at least four children		Co-ruler of K'ahk' Ti' Ch'ich'. Made war with Tikal and won over the city in 562, causing the collapse of the extensive power that it had.
Yax Yopaat Yukno'm Ti? Kaan (Yax Yopaat; Yuknoom Ti' Chan I; First Axewielder)		? Dzibanche (First?) son of Ut Chanal	572	579	579; Dzibanche	?	Monument 16 (573)	His life is mostly unknown today.
Uk'ay Kaan (Scroll Serpent)		? Dzibanche (Second?) son of Ut Chanal	2 September 579 (9.7.5.14.17)	611	611; Dzibanche	Lady Scroll-in-Hand at least one child	Monument 19	Attacked and sacked Palenque in two occasions: 599 and 611.
Yuknoom Tiʼ Chan (Chan)		? Dzibanche (First?) son of Uneh Chan and Lady Scroll-in-Hand	c.619		?	?		
Tajoom Ukʼab Kʼahkʼ (Ta Batz)		? Dzibanche (Second?) son of Uk'ay Kaan and Lady Scroll-in-Hand	28 March 622 (9.9.9.0.5)	1 October 630	1 October 630 (9.9.17.11.14); Dzibanche	?	Stela 28 (19 Mar 623); Stela 29 (19 Mar 623)	
Waxaklajuun Ubaah Kaan		? Dzibanche	630	636	640; Calakmul	?		Probably resided in Dzibanche. Lost the throne to his relative Yuknoom Head.
Yuknoom Head (Cauac Head)		? Dzibanche (Third?) son of Uk'ay Kaan and Lady Scroll-in-Hand	630	636	?	?	Stela 76 (633); Stela 78 (633)	Probably resided in Calakmul. Maybe the pre-accession name of Yuknoom Chʼeen II. Defeated his rival to the throne Waxaklajuun Ubaah Kaan 4 of April 636.
Ajxib’saaj Chan K’inich		?	Late 7th century		?	?		Called "Kalo´mte of the East", probably resided in Dzibanche.
B’alun Pet Usa(?)		?	c.695		?	?		

=== Dzibilchaltun ===
- c.800: Ukuw Chan Chaak

=== Ekʼ Balam ===
- Ukit Kan Leʼk Tokʼ (770-840)
- K'an B'ohb' Tok'
- Ukit Jol' Ahkul
- K'ihnich Junpik' Tok' Ku'uh Nal

=== Edzná ===
- Unen-Kʼawiil (c. 620-638)
- Sihyaj Chan Kʼawiil (c. 636–649)
- Kal-Chan-Chaak (649-662)
- Bʼaah Pahk (662-672), wife of the former
- Janaab Yook Kʼinich (672–692)
- Hul Janaab Chanek (692-c. 710)
- Chan Chawaj (c.711-731)
- Aj-Koht-Chowa-Nahkaan (c. 805–850)
- Pdrich (850-860s)
- Ajan (c.869)

=== La Florida ===
- ?: ? Ti' Hu'n Pih
- ?: Sihyaj Chan Kʼawiil
- ?: Aj Pat Chan
- ?: Chakaj Chaak
- c.677: Bahlam Kʼawiil
- c.681: Kʼahk Tiʼ Kuy
- ?: Uh Tiʼ Kuy
- c.700: Tahn Tuun Chaak
- c.731: Lady Chaak
- 731-766: Kʼahk Chan Yopaat
- c.790: A king, depicted in Stela 1

=== Holmul ===
(Note: No known dates)

- ?: Och Chan Yopaat
- ?: Sakhb Chan Yopaat Makcha
- ?: K’inich Tacal Tun
- ?: Vilaan Chak Tok Vakhab

=== Itzimté-Sakluk ('Ibil), La Libertad, Petén ===
Name or nickname	Reign	Dynastic succession number	Alternate names
Ti' 'O	c. 200-220 d.C.	1	
Smoking Head (K'ahk' ...l)	730 - 756	22?	K'ahk' K'awiil
K’ahk’ Chih.?.Yon Xaak Sak Ik' Jun Tzakab To'k'	756 - 776	23	

=== Ixkun ===
Nickname	Ruled
Eight Skull	–c. 790
Yukuul Chan/Kan Ahk (Rabbit God K)	c. 790–800

=== Ixtutz ===
- c.780: Aj Yaxjal B’aak Ak'iin?

=== Jimbal ===
- June 26, 879: Toox Ko...? K'awiil

=== Kaminaljuyu (Chiih Ka'?/Chiih Witz?) ===
- c. 100 - 1 B.C.: Chak Usiij

=== Lacanha ===
- Aj Popol Chay

=== Machaquila ===
Name/Glyph	Image	Born	Reigned from	Reigned until	Death	Consort (s)	Monuments	Notes
Machaquila dynasty
Yax Tzu'? Chaak								
Tayal Chan K'inich		?	c.475		?	?		
Tajal Mo'		?	¿?- 664		?	?		
Sihyaj Kʼin Chaak I		?	670	710	c.710 Machaquila	?	Stela 13; Altar E	
"Etzʼnab"-Chaak		?	711	761	c.761 Machaquila	?	Stelae 10, 11, 12; Altar F	At the end of his reign, Machaquilá's suzerain kingdom, Dos Pilas, was abandoned and, during the political turmoil that followed, Cancuén stole power from Machaquilá.
Chak Xan Bahlam		?	c.775		?	?	Stela 18; Cancuén Ballcourt Marker 2; Tayasal Vase “T7B/6-22”	
Under Cancuén rule: 786–799
Ochk'in Kalo'mte'		5 December 770 (9.16.19.15.12); Machaquila	28 June 800 (9.18.9.15.10)	815	815; Machaquila (aged around 44/45)	? at least one child	Stela 2	
Sihyaj Kʼin Chaak II		? Machaquila; Son of Aj Ho' Baak	2 April 815 (9.19.4.15.1)	821	824; Machaquila	? at least one child	Stelae 3 and 4	
Uchan B'ul K'ahk'			821	824				
Juun Tsak-Took		? Machaquila; Son of Sihyaj K'in Ich’aak II	3 March 824 (9.19.13.15.19)	841	840; Machaquila	?	Stelae 5, 6, 7 and 8	
Scorpion Ti' Chaak		?	841	849	?	?		

=== La Mar ===
- 781-?: Parrot Chaak

=== Moral Reforma ===
- 662-after 690: Muwaan Jol, ascended under king Yuknoom of Calakmul; however, in 690, ascended once again under the king of Palenque.
- 756: Wo Chan K'awiil

=== Motul de San José ===
- 701-c.710: Yichte Kʼinich I
- c.700–725: Sak Muwaan
- c.725–735: Tayel Chan Kʼinich
- ?: Sihyaj Kʼawiil
- c.742–755: Yajaw Teʼ Kʼinich (son of Sak Muwaan)
- c.755–779: Lamaw Ekʼ

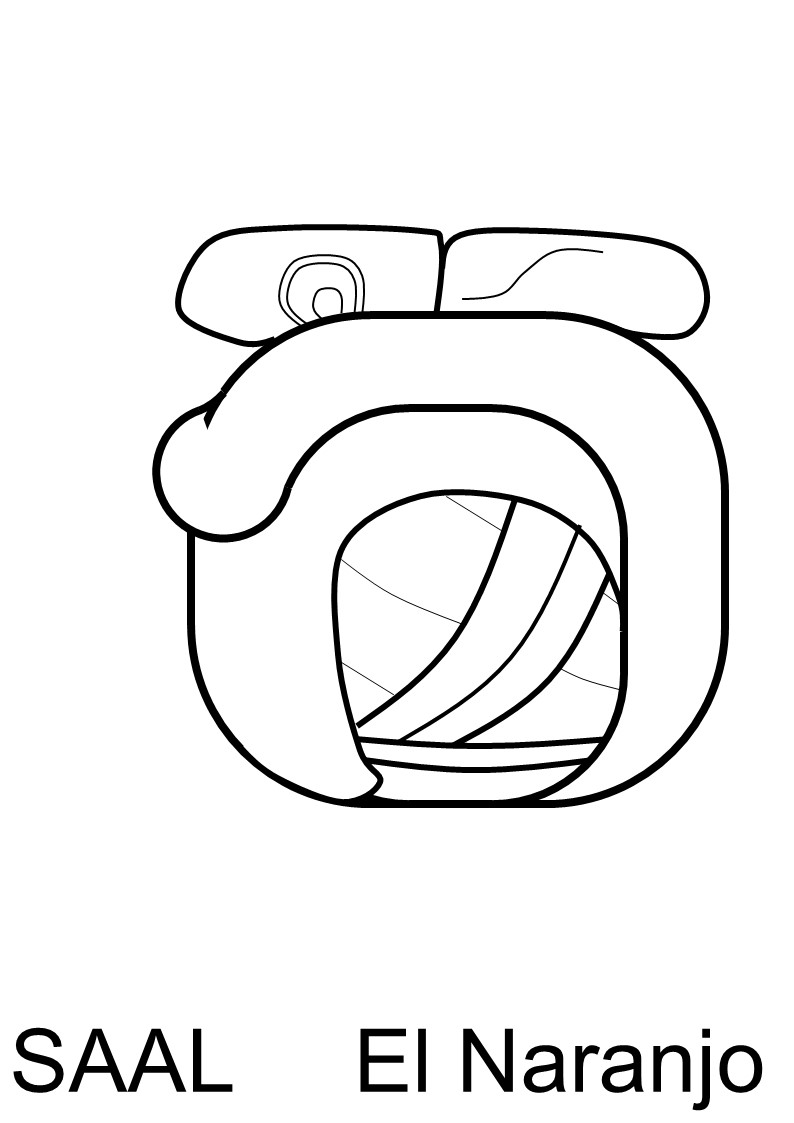
=== Naranjo ===
Name/Glyph	Image	Born	Reigned from	Reigned until	Death	Consort (s)	Monuments	Notes
1st Naranjo dynasty
Ichpuy Ajaw		?	c. 258 BCE?		?	?	Altar 1	First known ruler?, a wahyis?. He used the dynastic title Sak Chuwen
Tzikʼin?Bahlam		?	?		?	?	Stela 45	First known ruler.
Naatz Chan Ahk		?	c. 475		?	?	Stela 41	
Kʼinich Tajal Chaak		? Naranjo; Son of Lady Casper	?		?	?		
Pik Chan Ahkul		?	?		?	Lady Stone-in-Hand Sky at least one child		Inferred as king by his son's inscriptions.
Aj Numsaaj Wosal Chan Kʼinich (Double Comb)		534; Naranjo; Son of Pik Chan Ahkul and Lady Stone-in-Hand Sky	5 May 546 (9.5.12.0.4)	615	615; Naranjo (aged around 80/81)	? at least one child	Stela 15?, 16, 17, 25, 27, 38 and 41; Altar 1	
Kʼuxaj [Chan] K'inich		? Son of Aj Wosal Chan Kʼinich	615	27 December 631	27 December 631 (9.9.18.16.3); Naranjo	?		Defeated by Caracol (626) and by Calakmul (631)
Kʼahkʼ Xiiw Chan Chaahk		?	c.644	c.680	c.680 Naranjo	?		37th ruler of Naranjo, according to the inscriptions on the site. His rule, however, didn't produce any surviving monuments. He was victorious against Caracol.
2nd Naranjo dynasty / Tikal-Dos Pilas dynasty
Wak Chan Lem of Dos Pilas (Lady Six Sky)		15 July 669 (or after); Dos Pilas; Daughter of Bʼalaj Chan Kʼawiil, King of Dos Pilas and Lady Buluʼ	30 August 682 (9.12.10.5.12.) 11 October 721 (9.14.10.0.0)	693 16 February 741	16 February 741 (9.15.9.11.6); Naranjo (aged around 72)	Kʼakʼ U ? Chan Chaak of Naranjo at least one child	Stela 22 (23 Jan 702); Stela 24 (24 Jan 702); Stela 21 (24 Mar 706); Stela 23 (19 Mar 710); Stelae 2 and 3 (13 Feb 713); Stelae 29 and 30 (16 Nov 714); Stela 28 (13 Apr 716); Stelae 31 and 40 (10 Oct 721); Stelae 18 and 46 (14 Sep 726); Stelae 1 and 26	Wak Chanil arrived from Dos Pilas to form a new dynasty in Naranjo. United herself in marriage with a cousin of the previous ruler, Kʼahkʼ Xiiw Chan Chaahk, called K'ahk' U Chan Chaahk, from 693 she held regency for her son. Possibly as early as 721 or after his son's death in 728, she reassumed the reins of the kingdom as queen regnant, or queen regent for her second son (or grandson). In the reign of Kʼakʼ Tiliw Chan Chaak, Wak Chanil's son, Naranjo fought and won a series of victories against polities, some of whom may have been rebelling against Wak Chanil herself. It's possible that was her the organizer of many of Naranjo campaigns that, early in his reign, defeated Yaxha, Tikal, and Ucanal.
Regency of Lady Wak Chanil of Dos Pilas (693-26 March 706)							Stela 22 (23 Jan 702); Stela 24 (24 Jan 702); Stela 21 (24 Mar 706); Stela 23 (19 Mar 710); Stelae 2 and 3 (13 Feb 713); Stelae 29 and 30 (16 Nov 714); Stela 28 (13 Apr 716); Stelae 31 and 40 (10 Oct 721); Stelae 18 and 46 (14 Sep 726); Stelae 1 and 26	
Kʼakʼ Tiliw Chan Chaak (Smoking Squirrel)		6 January 688 (9.12.15.13.7); Naranjo; Son of Kʼakʼ U ? Chan Chaak and Lady Wak Chanil of Dos Pilas	31 May 693 (9.13.1.3.19)	c.728	c.728 (or after); Naranjo (aged around 31/32)	Lady Unen Bahlam of Tuubʼal; 21 March 710 at least one child	Stela 22 (23 Jan 702); Stela 24 (24 Jan 702); Stela 21 (24 Mar 706); Stela 23 (19 Mar 710); Stelae 2 and 3 (13 Feb 713); Stelae 29 and 30 (16 Nov 714); Stela 28 (13 Apr 716); Stelae 31 and 40 (10 Oct 721); Stelae 18 and 46 (14 Sep 726); Stelae 1 and 26	
Yax Mayuy Chan Chaak		? Naranjo; Son of Kʼakʼ U ? Chan Chaak and Lady Wak Chanil of Dos Pilas	c.741	4 February 744 (15.9.12.11.13)	14 June 744 (9.15.13.0.0); Naranjo or Tikal?	?	Stelae 18 and 46 (14 Sep 726); Stela 5 of Tikal	Defeated by Tikal and sacrificed months later.
Kʼakʼ Yipiiy Chan Chaak		?	15 August 746 (9.15.15.3.16)	748 or 755	748 or 755; Naranjo	?	Stela 20	
Kʼahkʼ Ukalaw Chan Chaak		? Naranjo; Son of Kʼakʼ Tiliw Chan Chaak and Lady Unen Bahlam of Tuubʼal	20 November 755 (9.16.4.10.18)	780	780; Naranjo	Lady Star Shell of Yaxha at least two children	Stelae 6, 11, 13, 19, 33 and 36	
K'e-ji Bat-le Kʼawiil Aj Tok' Ti, K'ak' Kalote Chan Chaak		? Naranjo; Son of Kʼahkʼ Ukalaw Chan Chaak and Lady Star Shell of Yaxha	755-784?		?	?		
Itzam Kokaaj Kʼawiil (Shield; Shield God K)		13 March 771 (9.17.0.2.12); Naranjo; Son of K'ahk' Ukalaw Chan Chaak and Lady Star Shell of Yaxha	4 February 784 (9.17.13.4.3)	810	c.810 Naranjo (aged around 38/39)		Stela 35 (799); Stelae 7, 8, 10, 12 and 14	He was victorious against Yaxha.
Waxaklajuun Ubʼaah Kʼawiil		?	c.814		?	?	Stela 32 of Ucanal	

=== Nebaj ===
- 810-830: Tayel? Aj Tuun Nal/Winkil? Noh[ol?] Yo[k]K'in

=== Nim Li Punit ===
Name or nickname	Reign	Dynastic succession number	Alternative names and translations
Chak Unan and K'inich Ch'ajo'm	August 24, 524?		"Eye Dispenser/Face of the Sun"
Janaab' Ohl K'inich	29 January 647 – 1 July 672+	?	
Ix K'uh "Pot"	721		
Ruler of unknown name, Lahun Ka'an?	726		
Lahun Ka'an	741		
Moo' Chuwaaj(?)	October 9, 790 – 800		Lord Macaw
Ruler of unknown name	830		

=== Palenque ===
==== Mythological and legendary rulers ====
- ?-Muwaan Mat c.2325 BC
- Ukʼix Chan c.987 BC
- Casper c.252 BC

==== Historical rulers ====
Name/Glyph	Image	Born	Reigned from	Reigned until	Death	Consort (s)	Monuments	Notes
Palenque dynasty
Kʼukʼ Bahlam I (Kuk; Bahlum Kʼuk)		30 March 397 (8.18.0.13.7); Palenque	10 March 431 (8.19.15.3.5)	435	435; Palenque (aged 37/38)	?	One stone censer	Founder of the dynasty.
Ch'aaj Ch'ich' (Ch'aaj K'ik'; Casper; 11 Rabbit)		8 August 422 (8.19.6.8.9); Palenque; Son of Kʼukʼ Bahlam I?	9 August 435 (8.19.19.11.18)	c.487	c.487 Palenque (aged 64/65)	?		
Bʼutz Aj Sak Chiik (Manik)		15 November 459 (9.1.4.5.2); Palenque; Son of Casper?	28 July 487 (9.2.12.6.19)	c.501	c.501 Palenque (aged 41/42)	?		His successor, Ahkal Moʼ Nahb, was probably his brother.
Ahkal Moʼ Nahb I (Chaacal I; Akul Anab I)		5 July 465 (9.1.10.0.1); Palenque; Son of Casper?	3 June 501 (9.3.6.7.17)	29 November 524	29 November 524 (9.4.10.4.17); Palenque (aged 59)	?		The list of ancestors made by his descendant Pakal the Great starts with him.
Interregnum: 524–529
Kʼan Joy Chitam I (Hok; Kan Xul I; K'an Hok' Chitam)		5 May 490 (9.2.15.3.11); Palenque; Son of Ahkal Moʼ Nahb I?	6 February 529 (9.4.14.9.7)	6 February 565	6 February 565 (9.6.11.0.16); Palenque (aged 74)	? two children		
Ahkal Moʼ Nahb II (Chaacal II; Akul Anab II)		3 September 523 (9.4.9.0.4); Palenque; Son of Kʼan Joy Chitam I	2 May 565 (9.6.11.5.1)	21 July 570	21 July 570 (9.6.16.10.7); Palenque (aged 46)	? no children		
Kan Bahlam I (Chan Bahlum I)		18 September 524 (9.4.10.1.5); Palenque; Son of Kʼan Joy Chitam I	6 April 572 (9.6.18.5.12)	1 February 583	1 February 583 (9.7.9.5.5); Palenque (aged 58)	? one child?		
Yohl Ikʼnal (Lady Kan Ik; Lady K'anal Ik'nal)		? Palenque; Daughter of Kʼan Joy Chitam I or Kan Bahlam I	21 December 583 (9.7.10.3.8)	5 November 604	5 November 604 (9.8.11.6.12); Palenque	? two children		
Ajen Yohl Mat (Aj Ne' Ohl Mat; Ac Kan; Ahl Lawal Mat)		? Palenque; Son of Yohl Ikʼnal?	1 January 605 (9.8.11.9.9)	8 or 11 August 612	8 or 11 August 612; Palenque	? two children		During his reign (4 April 611), Palenque was invaded by Calakmul.
Sak Kʼukʼ (Muwaan Mat; Lady Beastie)		? Palenque; Daughter of Janahb Pakal I and Yohl Ikʼnal?	20 October 612 (9.8.19.7.18)	27 July 615 (9.9.2.4.8)	10 September 640 (9.10.7.13.5); Palenque	Kʼan Moʼ Hix one or two children		Abdicated to her son.
Kʼinich Janaabʼ Pakal I the Great (Pacal; 8 Ahau; Sun Shield)		19 March 603 (9.8.9.12.15); Palenque; Son of Kʼan Moʼ Hix and Sak Kʼukʼ	27 July 615 (9.9.2.4.8)	26 August 683	26 August 683 (9.12.11.5.15); Palenque aged 80	Tzʼakbu three children	Temple El Olvidado; Additions to the Palace of Palenque; Building E (Sak Nuk Naah, "White Skin House"); Houses A, B and C	He was responsible for the construction or extension of some of Palenque's most notable surviving inscriptions and monumental architecture.
Kʼinich Kan Bahlam II (Chan Bahlum II)		23 May 635 (9.10.2.6.5); Palenque; Son of Kʼinich Janaabʼ Pakal I and Tzʼakbu	10 January 684 (9.12.11.12.12)	20 February 702	20 February 702 (9.13.10.1.7); Palenque aged 66	? no children	Tablets and Alfardas of the Temples of the Cross, Sun and Foliated Cross; Tablets and facade of the Temple of the Inscriptions; Temple 17 Panel; Death's Head; Jonuta Panel; Temple of the Cross Stela	He continued the ambitious project of adorning Palenque with fine art and architecture begun by his father.
Kʼinich Kʼan Joy Chitam II (Kan Xul II; K'an Hok' Chitam On II		31 October 644 (9.10.11.16.17); Palenque; Son of Kʼinich Janaabʼ Pakal I and Tzʼakbu	28 May 702 (9.13.10.6.4)	c.721	721; Palenque aged 76/77	? no children	Tablets and Alfardas of the Temples of the Cross, Sun and Foliated Cross; Tablets and facade of the Temple of the Inscriptions; Temple 17 Panel; Death's Head; Jonuta Panel; Temple of the Cross Stela	He was captured by Toniná in 711, but possibly restored to kingship.
Kʼinich Ahkal Moʼ Nahb III (Chaacal III; Akul Anab III)		23 September 678 (9.12.6.5.17); Palenque; Son of Tiwol Chan Mat and Kinuw	30 December 721 (9.14.10.4.0)	c.736	c.736 Palenque aged 57/58	Men Nik one child	Temple XVIII texts; Temple XIX bench and texts; Temple XXI texts; Tablets of the Orator and Scribe; Bundle Panel; House E Painted text?	Grandson of Kʼinich Janaab Pakal I. His construction program rivaled that of his predecessors, and contributed enormously to the surviving records of Palenque history.
Kʼinich Janaab Pakal II (Upakal K'inich)		? Palenque; Son of Tiwol Chan Mat and Kinuw	c.742		?	? one child	Bodega no. 1144	Probable brother of the predecessor.
Kʼinich Kan Bahlam III		?	c.751		?	?		A text at Pomona, the only source of his existence, suggests that his reign was short or troubled.
Kʼinich Kʼukʼ Bahlam II (Bahlum K'uk' II; Mahk'ina K'uk')		? Palenque; Son of Kʼinich Ahkal Moʼ Nahb III and Men Nik	4 March 764 (9.16.13.0.5)	c.783	c.783 Palenque	?	Tablet of the 96 glyphs; Creation Tablet; House B Mural?; Bodega no. 218	
Janaab Pakal III (6 Cimi Pakal)		?	13 November 799 (9.18.9.4.2)	?		?		

=== El Palma (Lakamtuun) ===
Name/Glyph	Image	Born	Reigned from	Reigned until	Death	Consort (s)	Monuments	Notes
Lakamtuun dynasty
Ahiin Chan Ahk		?	6th century	518	518	?		Captured by Ruler C of Piedras Negras
?		?	5th century		?	?		Captured by K'ihnich Tatb'u Jol II of Yaxchilan.
lk' Chih		? El Palma	8th century		?	?		Sacrificed by Yaxun B'alam IV of Yaxchilan in a ball game ceremony.
Kan Waxak' Ek		?	c. 849		?	?		He is mentioned in inscriptions from the city of Ceibal, in the Petexbatun region

=== El Palmar (Wak Piit), Campeche, México ===
Name or nickname	Reign	Dynastic succession number	Alternate names
Ajaw K’al Ubaah	131-180 d.C.	1?	
Tz’u Chak Ahk	342 d.C.	?	
K'ahk' P'uhjlaj? Chan Yopaat	554 d.C.	?	

=== El Perú-Waka' ===
Name/Glyph	Image	Born	Reigned from	Reigned until	Death	Consort (s)	Monuments	Notes
Waka' dynasty
"Leaf" Chan Ak		?	c.327	357?	357?	?		Founder of the dynasty.
"Skull Snake"		?	c.356		?	?		
K'inich Bahlam I		?	c.378		?	?		
Dragon Jaguar		?	c.410		?	?		
"Tapir" Chan Ak		?	c.450		?	?		
Chan Yopaat		?	c.502		?	?		
Chak Tok Ich'aak		?	520	556	556	Lady Ikom		Ally of the Kaanul (Snake) dynasty.
Wa'oom Uch'ab Tz'ikin		?	556	?	?	?		Enthroned by Kʼahkʼ Tiʼ Chiʼchʼ of the Kaanul (Snake) dynasty.
Muam Bahlam		?	late 6th century		?	?		
K'inich Bahlam II		?	657	711	711	Lady K'abel		Co-ruled with Lady K'abel of the Kaanul (Snake) dynasty.
Bahlam Tzam		?	730?	743	?	?		
Lady Pakal		?	771	790	?	?		
Ah Yax Yopaat		?	802	?	?	?		

=== Piedras Negras ===
Name/Glyph	Image	Born	Reigned from	Reigned until	Death	Consort (s)	Monuments	Notes
1st Piedras Negras dynasty
Kʼan Ahk I (Ruler A; Turtleshell)		?	c.297		?	?		Ruler A was later captured by Moon Skull of Yaxchilan.
Kʼan Ahk II (Ruler B)		?	c.478		?	?		
Yat Ahk I (Ah Cauac Ah K'in; Turtletooth)		?	c.510		?	?		
Ruler C		?	30 June 514 (9.3.19.12.12)	c.520	c.520 Piedras Negras	?	Panel 12 (30 Sep 514)	
Kʼinich Yoʼnal Ahk I (Ruler 1)		?	14 November 603 (9.8.10.6.16)	3 February 639	3 February 639 (9.10.6.2.1); Piedras Negras	Lady Bird Headdress at least one child	Stela 26 (11 Nov 624); Stelae 25, 31; R-5 Pyramid	Some scholars have argued that Kʼinich Yoʼnal Ahk I refounded the ruling dynasty at Piedras Negras.
Chaahk Itzam Kʼan Ahk I (Ruler 2)		22 May 626 (9.9.13.4.1); Piedras Negras; Son of Kʼinich Yoʼnal Ahk I and Bird Headress	12 April 639 (9.10.6.5.9)	15 November 686	15 November 686 (9.12.14.10.13); Piedras Negras (aged 50)	Lady White Bird at least one child	Stela 35 (658); Panel 2 (21 Aug 662); Stelae 33, 34, 36, 37, 38, 39; Panels 4, 7; Throne 2	
Kʼinich Yoʼnal Ahk II (Ruler 3)		30 December 664 (9.11.12.7.2); Piedras Negras; Son of Itzam Kʼan Ahk I and White Bird	2 January 687 (9.12.14.13.1)	c. 729	c. 729; Piedras Negras (aged 64/65)	Winik Haab' Ajaw of Namaan; 21 November 686 (9.12.14.10.16) one child	Stela 1 (Sep 706); Stela 2 (Sep 706); Stela 3 (711); Stela 4 (711); Stela 8 (18 Mar 726); Stelae 5, 6; J-5 Pyramid courtyard; Altar 1; Panel 15	
2nd Piedras Negras dynasty
Itzam Kʼan Ahk II (Ruler 4)		18 November 701 (9.13.9.14.15); Piedras Negras	9 November 729 (9.14.18.3.13)	26 November 757	26 November 757 (9.16.6.11.17); Piedras Negras (aged 56)	Juntan Ahk of Piedras Negras (?) possibly three children	Stela 7 (20 Aug 731); Stela 11 (22 Aug 731); Stela 9 (5 Oct 736); Stela 40 (746); Stelae 10, 22; O-13 Pyramid; Altar 2	There is evidence that Itzam Kʼan Ahk II started a new patriline at Piedras Negras. It's possible that he also married the daughter of the previous ruler.
Yoʼnal Ahk III (Ruler 5)		? Piedras Negras; Son of Itzam Kʼan Ahk II	10 March 758 (9.16.6.17.1)	c. 767	c. 767; Piedras Negras	?	Stelae 14 and 16	
Haʼ Kʼin Xook (Ruler 6)		? Piedras Negras; Son of Itzam Kʼan Ahk II	14 February 767 (9.16.16.0.4)	24 March 780	24 March 780 (9.17.9.5.11) or after 780; Piedras Negras	?	Stelae 13, 18 and 23	Appears to have either died or abdicated. Scholars are unsure if 24 March 780 refers to Ha' K'in Xook's death date, or rather the date of his burial.
Kʼinich Yat Ahk II (Ruler 7)		7 April 750 (9.15.18.16.7.); Piedras Negras; Son of Itzam Kʼan Ahk II	31 May 781 (9.17.10.9.4.)	c. 808	c. 808; Piedras Negras (aged 57/58)	?	Stela 12 (15 Sep 795); Stela 15; Altar 4; Panel 1?, 3; Throne 1	Took the throne almost a year following the death of Ha' K'in Xook. Despite this time gap, there is no evidence anyone was ruling Piedras Negras in the interim. He was later captured by K'inich Tatbu Skull IV of Yaxchilan.

=== Pomona ===
- Muyal Hix Chaahk

=== Pusilha ===
- c.569–595: K’awiil Chan K’inich (this first ruler and dynasty probably descended from the first dynasty of Naranjo)
- c.595–650: K’ahk U’ Ti’ Chan
- c.650–670: Muyal Naah K’ukhul K’ahk’ U’
- c.670–680: Ruler D
- c.680–710: Ruler E
- c.710–731: Lady Ich’aak K’inich
- c.731–750: K’ahk Chan (began a new line of rulers)
- c.750–768: K’ahk Kalav
- c.768-c.800?: K’awiil Chan

=== Quiriguá ===
Name (or nickname)	Ruled	Dynastic succession no.
Tok Ch'ich'	426–?	1
Tutuum Yohl Kʼinich	c. 455	2
Mih Toh	c. 480	3
Chan [Yop]aat	493–?	4
Kʼawiil Yopaat ("Ruler 5")	653–	7?
?...K'in Chaahk	c. 720	13?
Kʼakʼ Tiliw Chan Yopaat ("Cauac Sky" or "Kawak Sky")	724–785	14?
Chan Tiliw Yopaat	785 – c. 795	15?
K'ahk Jolow Chan Yopaat	c. 800 – c. 810	17?

=== El Resbalón ===
- Ti’ Chan K’inich Xan Bahlam (ca. 338 a. C. - ?)
- Aj ¿? Xan Bahlam (438 d.C.)
- Lak'nes Bahlam (509 d. C. - 569 d. C.?)

=== Río Azul ===
- Ruler X, not yet satisfactorily deciphered.

=== Sacul ===
- c.760–790: K’iyel Janab’

=== Sak Tz'i-Lacanjá-Tzeltal ===
Name	Dates
U K'ab'	c. 564
Kʼab Chan Teʼ I	c. 594–641
Kʼab Chan Te II?	c.653–693
Aj Sak Maax	c.754–772
Yeht' Kʼinich	c. 787
Jatsʼ Tokal Ekʼ Hiix	c.796?
Kʼabʼ Chan Teʼ III	c. 864

=== Seibal ===
Name	Title or nickname	Ruled
K'an Mo' B'alam		c. 415-416 c.721
Pat-Kawiil		? (7th–8th century?)
Ichʼaak Bahlam I (Jaguar Claw)	"Jaguar Claw"	?-c.735
Ichʼaak Bahlam II	"Jaguar Claw"	c.735–c.750
Kʼinich Bahlam		?
Ajaw Bʼot (Ah Ahpo Chuen; Ruler D)	Ruler D	771–?
Watʼul Kʼatel	Aj B'olon Haab'tal, Ah-Bolon-Abta	830–889+
Kʼuhul Itʼsat		c.860?
Kʼap Sak Nik		c.880?

=== Tamarindito ===
Name	Ruled
Ruler 1	ca. 513
Wakoh Kʼinich	ca. 534 – ca. 554
Ruler 3	ca. 573
Ruler 4	– 613
Wakoh Chan Kʼinich	a. 613 –
Aj Ajan Nah	ca. 660
Aj Ihkʼ Wolok	ca. 660 – ca. 702
Ruler 8	ca. 705
Ruler 9	– ca. 711
Ruler 10	– 712
Chak Bin Ahk	a. 712 – ca. 731
Chanal Balam	a. 760 – ca. 764

=== Teotihuacan ===
- c.378: Jatzo'm Kuuj/Spearthrower Owl, ruled when his son took over Tikal.

=== Tikal ===
The dynastic line of Tikal, founded as early as the 1st century AD, spanned 800 years and included at least 33 rulers.

Name/Glyph	Image	Born	Reigned from	Reigned until	Death	Consort (s)	Monuments	Notes
1st Tikal dynasty
Yax Ehb' Xok (Yax Moch Xok; Yax Chakte'l Xok; First Scaffold Shark)		?	c.60		?	?		Founder of Tikal lineage.
Huun? Bahlam (Foliated Jaguar; Decorated Jaguar; Scroll Ahau Jaguar)		?	c.100		?	?	Stela 29 (6 Jul 292)	
Chak Tok Ich'aak I			January 25, 212?	c. 292?				
K'inich Ehb' (Animal Headdress)		?	July 8, 292	?	?	Lady Skull at least one child	Stela 1 of El Encanto	
Sihyaj Chan Kʼawiil I		? Tikal; Son of K'inich Ehb' and Lady Skull	c.307		?		Stela 1 of El Encanto	
Unen Bahlam (Lady Une' B'alam)		?	c.317		?	?	Small sherd (fragment of a vase)	Assumed to be female, the sex of this ruler is in fact unclear.
Kʼinich Muwaan Jol (Mahk'ina Bird Skull; Feather Skull)		?	?	22 May 359	22 May 359 (8.16.2.6.0); Tikal	Bahlam Way at least one child	Stela 39 (19 Oct 376); Stela 28; Dynastic vase; Stela from Corozal; Sculpture named Man of Tikal	
Chak Tok Ichʼaak II (Great Paw; Great Jaguar Paw; Toh Chak Ichʼak)		? Tikal; Son of Kʼinich Muwaan Jol and Bahlam Way	7 August 360 (8.16.3.10.2)	16 January 378	16 January 378 (8.17.1.4.12); Tikal	?	Stela 39 (19 Oct 376); Stela 26; Stela from Corozal; Sculpture named Man of Tikal	On the day he died, Tikal was invaded by troops led by Siyaj Kʼakʼ, who overthrew the reigning family.
2nd Tikal dynasty / Teotihuacan dynasty
Yax Nuun Ayiin I (Curl Snout; Curl Nose)		? Teotihuacan; Son of Spearthrower Owl	12 September 379 (8.17.2.16.17)	18 June 404	18 June 404 (8.18.8.1.2); Tikal	Lady K'inich at least one child	Stela 4 (6 Jul 396); Stela 18 (6 Jul 396); Sculpture named Man of Tikal; Burial 10 of Temple 34	The son of the person identified as the ruler of Teotihuacan, placed on the throne by Siyaj Kʼakʼ and under his influence, founded a new line of rulers in Tikal.
Sihyaj Chan K'inich (regent)			406	November 411				
Sihyaj Chan Kʼawiil II (Storm Sky; Manikin Cleft Sky)		? Tikal; Son of Yax Nuun Ayiin I and Lady K'inich	26 November 411 (8.18.15.11.0)	3 February 456	3 February 456 (9.1.0.8.0); Tikal	Lady Ayiin at least one child	Stela 31 (17 Oct 445); Stelae 1 and 28; Burial 48 of Temple 33	
Kʼan Chitam Ehb' Xook (Kan Boar; K'an Ak)		26 November 415 (8.18.19.12.1); Tikal; Son of Sihyaj Chan Kʼawiil II and Lady Ayiin	8 August 458 (9.1.2.17.17)	486	486; Tikal (aged 70/71)	Lady Tzutz Nik at least one child	Stela 40 (17 Jun 468); Stelae 2, 9 and 13	
Chak Tok Ichʼaak III (Jaguar Paw II; Jaguar Paw Skull)		? Tikal; Son of Kʼan Chitam and Lady Tzutz Nik	486	24 July 508	24 July 508 (9.3.13.12.5); Tikal	Lady Hand; Probably two children	Stela 27 (28 Jan 495); Stelae 3, 7, 15 and possibly 26.	
Ch'ajan Mut, Yo K'in (Lady of Tikal)		1 September 504 (9.3.9.13.3); Tikal; Daughter of Chak Tok Ichʼaak II and Lady Hand?	19 April 511 (9.3.16.8.4)	527	After 534; Tikal	?	Stela 6 (514); Stela 25 (30 Set 517); Stela 12 (9 Aug 527); Stelae 10 and 23	Ruled jointly. Possibly married?
Kalo'mte' Bahlam (Curl Head)		?	c.511 Tikal	527	After 527; Tikal	?	Stela 6 (514); Stela 25 (30 Set 517); Stela 12 (9 Aug 527); Stelae 10 and 23	Ruled jointly. Possibly married?
[K'inich] Waaw I (Bird Claw, Animal Skull)		?	?		?	?	Stela 8	Ruled after Yo K'in. He carried a high-ranking name but no Tikal emblem. Possibly an interim ruler, or usurper?
Wak Chan Kʼawiil (Double Bird)		January 508; Tikal; Son of Chak Tok Ichʼaak II and Lady Hand	27 December 537 (9.5.3.9.15)	562	562; Tikal (aged 53/54)	?	Stela 17 (15 Set 557); Altar 21 of Caracol	
3rd Tikal dynasty
Kʼinich Waaw II (Animal Skull; Lizard Head; Ete II)		? Tikal; Son of Fire Cross and Lady Hand Sky of Bahlam	562? or 593	628	628; Tikal	?		Had no apparent relation to the previous rulers; possibly a new dynasty began at this point.
Kʼinich Wayaan? (23rd Ruler)		?	c. 635 (if he is the 23rd Ruler) or c.628–650		?	?	Ceramics	Probably identifiable with 23rd Ruler?
Kʼinich Muwaan Jol II (24th Ruler)		?	c. 645 (if he is the 24th Ruler) or c.628–650		?	? at least one child	Ceramics	Probably identifiable with 24th Ruler?
Nuun Ujol Chaak (Shield Skull; Nun Ban Chak)		? Tikal; Son of K'inich Muwaan Jol II	657	679	679; Tikal	Lady Jaguar Seat at least one child	Lintel 3 of Temple 1	
Jasaw Chan Kʼawiil I (Ruler A; Ah Cacao; Sky Rain)		? Tikal; Son of Nuun Ujol Chaak and Lady Jaguar Seat	3 May 682 (9.12.9.17.16)	734	734; Tikal	Lady Lahan Unen Moʼ at least one child	Stela 30 (16 Mar 692); Stela 11 (3 Dec 711); Stela 16 (23 Dec 711); Tikal Temple I; Lintels 2 and 3 of Temple 1	His defeat of the rival Maya city of Calakmul in 695 is seen to represent a resurgence in the strength and influence of Tikal.
Yikʼin Chan Kʼawiil (Ruler B; Yaxkin Caan Chac; Sun Sky Rain)		? Tikal; Son of Jasaw Chan Kʼawiil I and Lady Lahan Unen Moʼ	8 December 734 (9.15.3.6.8)	766?	766? Tikal	? at least two children	Stela 21 (24 Jul 736); Stela 5 (744); Stela 20 (7 May 751)	He was one of Tikal's most successful and expansionary rulers, consolidating the political gains won by his father.
28th Ruler		? Tikal; Son of Yikʼin Chan Kʼawiil	c.766	c.768	c.768? Tikal	?		Little is known about this ruler.
Yax Nuun Ayiin II (Ruler C; Chitam)		? Tikal; Son of Yikʼin Chan Kʼawiil	25 December 768 (9.16.17.16.4)	c.794	c.794 Tikal	?	Stela 22 (22 Jan 771); Stela 19 (9 Oct 790); Altars 6 and 10	
Nuun Ujol Kʼinich		?	Between 794 and 810		?	? at least one child	Stela 24 (26 Jun 810); Lintel of Temple 3	
Nuno'm Ch'e'en (Dark Sun)		? Tikal; Son of Nuun Ujol Kʼinich	c.849		?	?	Altar 7; Lintel 2 of Temple 3	
Jewel Kʼawiil		?	c.849		?	?		
Jasaw Chan Kʼawiil II (Stela 11 Ruler)		?	c.869	c.889	c.889? Tikal	?	Stela 11 (869); Stela 12 of Uaxactun	

=== Toniná ===
Name/Glyph	Image	Born	Reigned from	Reigned until	Death	Consort (s)	Monuments	Notes
1st Toniná dynasty
Kokaaj(?) Witz’ (Ruler 1)		?	c.501/14		?	?		First known ruler of the site.
Chak Baluun Chahk		?	c.562-564		?	?	Monument 186	
K'inich(?) Sawan B'alam Yaxuun Tihl (Bahlam Ya-? Acal; Jaguar Bird Peccary; Zots Choj)		?	16 January 568 (9.6.8.17.4)	573	573; Toniná	?		
K’inich Muhk		?	Before 589	600	600; Toniná	?	Monument 185 (22 August 593); Monument 187	
K’inich Sanaw Bahlam Yaxuun Tihl		?	10 March 600 (9.8.6.11.9)	4 January 615 (9.9.1.12.2)	4 January 615; Toniná	?	Monument 173 (10 May 613)	
K'inich Bahlam Chapat (K'inich Hix Chapat)		?	31 January 615 (9.9.1.12.2)	668	668; Toniná	?	Monument 8 (8 May 682)	
Yuknoom Wahywal (Jaguar Casper; Ruler 2)		?	23 July 668 (9.11.16.0.3)	12 September 687	12 September 687 (9.12.15.7.13); Toniná	? at least two children	Monument 9 (12 Oct 652); Monument 12 (672); Monument 26 (29 Jun 672)	
K’inich B’aaknal Chaak (Kuk; Snake Skull; Ruler 3)		? Possible son of Yuknoom Wahywal	17 June 688 (9.12.16.3.12)	715	715; Toniná	?	Monument 3 (692); Monument 122 (28 Aug 711)	It's possible that they ruled together, at least in 688.
Aj Chʼaaj Naah		?	688		?	?		It's possible that they ruled together, at least in 688.
Kelʼne Hix		?	688		?	Lady Kʼawill Chan at least one child		It's possible that they ruled together, at least in 688.
Regency of Lady Kʼawill Chan (708/15–722)								Co-ruled with his uncle, K’inich B’aaknal Chaak, until 715. Under regency of his mother, the sister of K’inich B’aaknal Chaak, until 722.
K’inich Chuwaaj Chaak (Jaguar God; Ruler 4)		16 December 706 (9.13.14.17.7); Toniná; Son of Kel'ne Hix and Lady Kʼawill Chan	28 November 708 (9.13.16.17.0)	723	723; Toniná aged 16/17	?	Monument 122 (28 Aug 711)	Co-ruled with his uncle, K’inich B’aaknal Chaak, until 715. Under regency of his mother, the sister of K’inich B’aaknal Chaak, until 722.
2nd Toniná dynasty
Kʼinich Ichʼaak Chapat (Jaguar Claw; Ruler 5)		15 January 709 (9.13.17.1.8); Toniná; Son of Lady Winik Timak Kʼawiil	19 November 723 (9.14.12.2.9)	739	739; Toniná aged 29/30	Lady Muyal Chan Kʼawiil (I) at least one child	Monument 171 (727)	Has no known family relation to previous rulers; probably a new dynasty started at this point.
K’inich Tuun Chapat (Ruler 6 or 8)		? Toniná; Son of Kʼinich Ichʼaak Chapat and Lady Muyal Chan Kʼawiil (I)	739	15 February 762	15 February 762 (9.16.10.16.17); Toniná	? at least one child		
Lady Kʼawiil Yopaat (Ruler 7)		? Toniná; Daughter of K’inich Tuun Chapat	15 February 762 (9.16.10.16.17)	774	774; Toniná	? at least one child		Around 764 Toniná defeated Palenque in battle.
Kʼinich Chapat (Itzamnaaj Mut II?; Ruler 8?)		? Toniná; Son of Lady Kʼawiil Yopaat	774/787	c. 810	c. 810; Toniná	Lady Muyal Chan Kʼawiil (II) at least one child	Monument 114 (794)	The last successful warrior ruler of Toniná. It's possible that the heir prince who died in 775, Prince Wak Chan K'ahk, was his brother.
Uh Chapat (Ruler 9)		? Toniná; Son of Kelʼne Hix and Lady Kʼawill Chan	c.837		? Toniná	? at least one child?		
Ruler 10		? Toniná; Son of Uh Chapat?	c.901		? Toniná	?	Monument 158 (904); Monument 101 (18 Jan 909)	

=== Ucanal ===
Name or nickname	Reign	Dynastic succession number	Alternate names
"Way God-N"	c. 411 - 456		
K'uk' Ajaw	?	?	Lord Quetzal
Kokaaj B'alam I	c.688 - 698/702?	?	Itzamnaaj B'alam I, Kinich Cab, Shield Jaguar,
Kokaaj B'alam II	June 23, 712 - ?	?	Itzamnaaj B'alam II
Wuk Chapaht	c. 779		
Xu[xu]b/Xukub' Chahk	? - August 14, 796		
Unknown ruler	800	?	
Papmalil	c. 810		
Ho' Pet Chan Ek'	830	?	
Ul? Um?	November 30, 849		

=== Uaxactun ===
Name or nickname	Reign	Dynastic succession number	Alternate names
Wak Kab' Yok’in Ajaw (Lord of the Sixth Earth)	275 a. C.-250 BC	1	
“Smoking King”	¿?		
Yax Ehb' Xook?	100 BC		
K'ik'? ...?-la / "Blood Head"	10 BC		
Unknown ruler	100 BC/39 AD		
"Thorny Queen"	? - 260 AD		
"Trophy-Skull" Bahlam	April 17–19, 323 - 356?	25?	"Trophy-Skull Jaguar"
Tz’akbu Usiij I (Tzakbu Bird)	February 29, 356 - c.375	25	
Chaktan Wahywal K'in...? (Sun Raiser, "Cargador del Sol")	3 de agosto del 391-396? AD	26	
Xukub Chan Ahk	406	27	
Unen Bahlam Noho’l Winkil	c. 435	28	
Baahte' K’ihnich (Bat Mahk'ina)	445	29?	
Tz’akbu Usiij II? ("Bird Head")	c. 494-495? (Second half of the 5th century AD.)	31?	
Kokaaj Witz Winkil (Kokaaj Witznal, Witznal)	April 18, 498-507 AD	32	
"Chaan K'an Ko"	702 - 711 AD		
Jo' Ka'an (Oxlahun Koxba)	750/751		
Unknown ruler	771/790 AD		
K'ak' Hoplaj Chan Yopaat (Olom Chik'in Chakte', K'an Ko)	792 - 830		
Jasaw Chan K'awiil (K'al Chk'in Chakte')	889		

=== Xultun ===
- 508: Upakal K'inich
- Yax Weʼnel Chan Kʼinich, depicted in a mural of a Late Classic room, 10K2

=== Yaxchilan ===
Name/Glyph	Image	Born	Reigned from	Reigned until	Death	Consort (s)	Monuments	Notes
Yaxchilan dynasty
Yopaat Bahlam I		?	23 July 359 (8.16.2.9.1.)	?	?	?		Founder of Yaxchilan lineage.
Itzamnaaj Bahlam I (Shield Jaguar I)		?	?		?	?		
Yaxun Bahlam I (Bird Jaguar I)		?	378	389	389; Yaxchilan	?		
Yax Deer-Antler Skull		?	389	402	402; Yaxchilan	?		
Ruler 5		?	402	?	?	?		
Kʼinich Tatbʼu Jol I		?	?		?	?		
Jatz'o’ Jo’l		?	454	467	467; Yaxchilan	?		His previous nickame, "Moon Skull", is not an actual reference to the moon but is rather the Maya word for a spear-thrower, tz'o'.
Yaxun Bahlam II (Bird Jaguar II)		?	467	?	?	Lady Chuwen at least two children		The eighth king in the dynastic record of Yaxchilan. Two of his sons became kings after him, Knot-eye Jaguar I and K'inich Tatb'u Skull II.
Joy Bahlam I (Knot-eye Jaguar I)		? Yaxchilan; Son of Yaxun Bahlam II< and Lady Chuwen	508	518	518; Yaxchilan	? at least two children	Stela 27 (514)	The ninth known king of Yaxchilan, he reigned in the early 6th century. His glyphic name should probably be read as Joy Bahlam.
Kʼinich Tatbʼu Jol II		? Yaxchilan; Son of Yaxun Bahlam II and Lady Chuwen	11 February 526 (9.4.11.8.16)	537	537; Yaxchilan	? at least two children	Lintel 47 (11/13 Feb 526); Temple 12; Lintel 35	The tenth in the dynastic king list. He was another son of Bird Jaguar II.
Joy Bahlam II		?	c.560	c.570	c.570 Yaxchilan	?		
Itzamnaaj Bahlam II (Shield Jaguar II)		?	c.599 or c.599–611		?	?		
Kʼinich Tatbʼu Jol III		?	?		?	? at least one child	Stela 2 (613, possibly him)	
Yaxun Bʼalam III (6-Tun-Bird Jaguar; Bird Jaguar III)		? Yaxchilan; Son of Kʼinich Tatbʼu Jol III	631	681	681; Yaxchilan	Lady Pacal (c. 607? – 705) at least one child	Stela 6; Lintel 4	Described in one text as fifteenth in line from Yopaat Bʼalam I. Bird Jaguar III took Lady Pakal as his wife, who lived a very long life, dying in 705 at the age of at least 98 years. Their son and heir was Itzamnaaj Bahlam II.
Kokaaj Bahlam III (Itzamnaaj Bahlam; Shield Jaguar III)		647; Yaxchilan; Son of Yaxun Bʼalam III and Lady Pacal	23 October 681 (9.12.9.8.1)	15 June 742	15 June 742 (9.15.10.17.14); Yaxchilan (aged 94/95)	Lady Xoc Lady Eveningstar of Calakmul (1 September 704–751) at least one child Lady Sak B'iyaan	Lintel 24 (26 Oct 709); Lintel 23 (3 Aug 723); Lintel 26 (726); Lintel 14 (29 Jun 741); Temple 23; Lintel 25; Stelae 5, 11, 18 and 35	Ruled for 60 years. He was often referred to in hieroglyphic texts as Master of Aj Nik, referring to the capture of his first captive before he became king, this phrase being attached to his name on 32 separate occasions. Aj Nik himself was a sub-lord from a place known as either Maan or Namaan and was not of high rank.
Yopaat Bahlam II		?	c.749		?	?	Stela 11 (4 Jun 746, possibly him)	
Yaxuun Bʼalam IV (Bird Jaguar IV)		709 or later Yaxchilan; Son of Itzamnaaj Bahlam II and Lady Eveningstar of Calakmul	752	768	768; Yaxchilan (aged 56/57)	Lady Great Skull at least one child Lady Wak Tuun of Motul de San José Lady Wak Jalam Chan of Motul de San José Lady Mut Bahlam of Hix Witz	Lintel 17 (752); Lintel 16 (8 Feb 752); Lintel 13 (16 Feb 752); Lintel 1 (1 May 752); Lintel 21 (30 May 752); Lintel 5 (10 Jun 752); Lintel 6 (14 Oct 752); Lintel 7 (16 Oct 752); Lintel 41 (755); Lintel 8 (7 May 755); Lintel 28 (31 Aug 755); Lintel 3 (10 Apr 756); Lintel 2 (5 Apr 757); Lintel 9 (18 Jun 768); Lintels 12, 22, 29; Stela 10, 11	Possibly under regency of his mother in the beginning of his reign.
Kokaaj B'alam (IV) Chele'w Chan K'inich (Itzamnaaj Bahlam IV, Shield Jaguar IV)		18 February 752 (9.16.0.14.7); Yaxchilan; Son of Yaxun Bahlam IV and Lady Great Skull	769	c.800	c.800 Yaxchilan (aged around 47/48)	Lady Chab-Ahab at least one child		
Kʼinich Tatbʼu Jol IV		? Son of Itzamnaaj Bahlam IV and Lady Chab-Ahab	c.808		?	?	Lintel 10 (808)	Last known ruler of the city.

=== Yaxha ===
Name or nickname	Reign	Sucesión dinástica número	Notes
Yax Bolon Chahk	¿?	¿?	
Joyaj Chaahk	c. 711 - 714?	¿	
Kʼinich Lakamtuun	September 23, 793-September 5, 799	¿	

=== Yoʼokop ===
- c.570: Na Chaʼak Kab, a Kaloomte that may have ruled under the overlord Sky Witness from Calakmul or Dzoyola.

=== Yootz ===
- 14 January 713–730: Yajawte K’inich
- c.730-750: K’ahk’ Yohl K’inich
- c.750-760: Taxin Chan

=== El Zapote ===
- c.404?: K’ahk Bahlam
- c.439: Chan K’awiil

=== Zapote Bobal ===
- ?: Yukul K’awiil
- ?: Ti’ K’awiil
- ?-559: Chan Ahk
- April 24, 663-c.665?: Janaab Ti’ O
- ?-23 IV 663: Itzamnaaj Ahk

=== El Zotz (Pa' Chan/Ka'n), Petén ===
Name or nickname	Reign	Dynastic succession number	Notes
Chak Tz'uutz'/Yak? Ahk	c. 350?-366? AD.	1?	
Sihyaj Chan Ahk	c.366? - 381?	2?	This king likely ascended the throne following the attack by Uaxactun on El Zotz in 366. The Bagaces Disk indicates that this king of Pa' Chan was an ally of K'inich B'alam I of El Perú-Waka', who was ruling around 378.
Chak Tz'uutz'/Yak? Ahk (Chak Fish-Dog Ak, Red/Great Turtle)	c. 381?/388?-396 A.D.	3?	He ruled at El Bejucal, -having erected a stela there-, as a subordinate of Sihyaj K'ahk', he likely founded El Zotz, and was buried there.
Chak Tz'uutz'/Yak?	c. 590?	9?	
Chak Tz'uutz'/Yak? Ahk (Chak Chay Tz'i)	c. 610?		
Baahkab K’inich Chan? Waaw?	620-690? (Late Classic)		
Naahb'? Chan Yopaat	830		

== Known rulers of Mayan city-states in the Post-Classic Period ==
Notes:
- All dates AD; if otherwise, it is stated.
- The lists may not be completed. However, take in consideration that some lists are more completed than others in different aspects.
- English language names are provisional nicknames based on their identifying glyphs, where rulers' Maya language names have not yet been definitively deciphered phonetically.

=== Chichen Itzá ===
Name or nickname	Ruled	Nicknames	Notes
Lajcha'n Ahk'ab'	¿?	12 Noche	
Chok Wa'j Aab'	c. 869 - 878		Father of K'inil Kopol and K'ahk' Upakal
K'inil Kopol/Kojol(?)	878 - 879		Possibly ruler or a high-ranked official
K'ahk' Upakal K'ihnich K'awiil	878 - 890	Kakupakal	Possibly ruler or a high-ranked official
Ak-Holtun-Bahlam I	930 - 950		
Ak-Holtun Bahlam II	?-1047		
Poshek Ix Soi	1047-?		
Canek	c.1194		

==== Cocom dynasty ====
- Hunac Ceel, general who conquered the city in the 12th–13th century, and founded a new ruling family.

=== Iximche ===
Ahpo Sotzʼil	Ahpo Xahil	Kʼalel Achi	Ahuchan
Wuqu-Batzʼ	Hun-Toh	Chuluk	Xitamel-Keh
Oxlahuh-Tzʼiʼ	Lahuh-Ah		
Oxlahuh-Tzʼiʼ	Kablahuh-Tihax		
Hun-Iqʼ	Lahuh-Noh		
Cahi Imox	Belehe Qat		

=== Izamal ===
- c.1000?: Ah Ulil

=== Mayapán: ===
- c.1185 - 1204: Ah Kul Itzam Can

=== Mixco Viejo ===
Name	Ruled	Alternative names
Lajuj No'j	c.1450–c.1480	Ichalkan Chi Kumkwat, Ychal Amollac Chicumcuat (Chicome Coatl)
Achi Q'alel	early 16th century	–

=== Q'umarkaj ===
Name	Ruled	Alternative names
Bahlam Kitze	c.1225–1250	Iki' B'alam
Kʼokʼoja	c.1250–1275	-
E Tzʼikin	c.1275–1300	
Ajkan	1300–1325	
Kʼokaibʼ	c.1325–1350	
Kʼonache	c.1350–1375	
Kʼotuja	c.1375–1400	
Quqʼkumatz	c.1400–1435	
Kʼiqʼabʼ	c.1435–1475	
Waqxakʼ i-Kaam	c.1475–1500	
Oxib Keh	c.1500–1524	Three Deer
Cristóbal Nihaib'	1524-–1525	
Tecum Belejeb' Ix	1525-–1535	
Tepepul Waqxak Kawoq	1535-~1540	Juan de Sacapulas, Tepepul
Juan de Rojas [Kaweq]	Nominal	
Juan Cortés		

=== Uxmal ===
This city is here included because, despite being founded in the Classic period, it attained the peak of its influence in the Post Classic.

==== Tutul Xiu dynasty ====
- c.500: Hun Uitzil Chac, founded the kingdom in year 500.
- ?: Ah Suytok
- c.890–910: K’ahk Pulaj Chan Chaak
- 987–1007: Ak Mekat
- 1441–1461: Ah Xiu Xupan

== See also ==
- List of kings of Copán
- List of kings of Dos Pilas
- List of lords of Tikal
- List of kings of Yaxchilan
- Maya stelae
