= 622 =

Calendar year

622 in various calendars
- Gregorian calendar: 622; DCXXII
- Ab urbe condita: 1375
- Armenian calendar: 71; ԹՎ ՀԱ
- Assyrian calendar: 5372
- Balinese saka calendar: 543–544
- Bengali calendar: 28–29
- Berber calendar: 1572
- Buddhist calendar: 1166
- Burmese calendar: −16
- Byzantine calendar: 6130–6131
- Chinese calendar: 辛巳年 (Metal Snake); 3319 or 3112 — to — 壬午年 (Water Horse); 3320 or 3113
- Coptic calendar: 338–339
- Discordian calendar: 1788
- Ethiopian calendar: 614–615
- Hebrew calendar: 4382–4383
- Hindu calendars
- Vikram Samvat: 678–679
- Shaka Samvat: 543–544
- Kali Yuga: 3722–3723
- Holocene calendar: 10622
- Iranian calendar: 0–1
- Islamic calendar: 0–1
- Japanese calendar: N/A
- Javanese calendar: 512–513
- Julian calendar: 622; DCXXII
- Korean calendar: 2955
- Minguo calendar: 1290 before ROC 民前1290年
- Nanakshahi calendar: −846
- Seleucid era: 933/934 AG
- Thai solar calendar: 1164–1165
- Tibetan calendar: ལྕགས་མོ་སྦྲུལ་ལོ་ (female Iron-Snake); 748 or 367 or −405 — to — ཆུ་ཕོ་རྟ་ལོ་ (male Water-Horse); 749 or 368 or −404

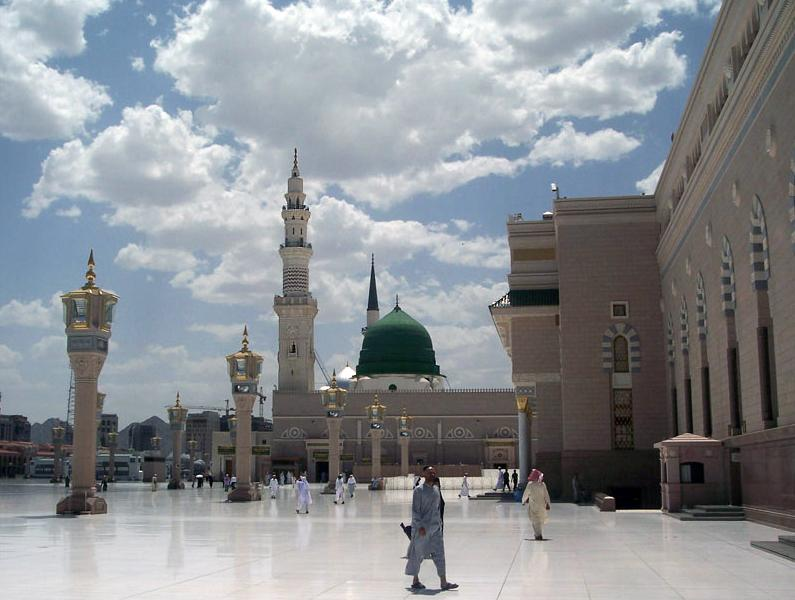
Muhammad's tomb (Green Dome) in Medina

Year 622 (DCXXII) was a common year starting on Friday of the Julian calendar, the 622nd year of the Common Era (CE) and Anno Domini (AD) designations, the 622nd year of the 1st millennium, the 22nd year of the 7th century, and the 3rd year of the 620s decade. The denomination 622 for this year has been used since the early medieval period, when the Anno Domini calendar era became the prevalent method in Europe for naming years.

== Events ==
=== By place ===
==== Byzantine Empire ====
- Byzantine–Sasanian War: Emperor Heraclius sails from Constantinople with an expeditionary force (probably 50,000 men), and starts a counter-offensive against the Persian Empire (his young son, Constantine III, is left behind as regent under the charge of Sergius I, patriarch of Constantinople, and patrician Bonus). He lands a few days later at the junction of Cilicia and Syria, near Alexandretta and ancient Issus.
- Battle of Issus: Heraclius defeats the Persian forces under Shahrbaraz in Cappadocia. He recaptures Anatolia, but returns to Constantinople to deal with the threat posed to his Balkan domains by the Avars, and puts the Byzantine army into winter quarters in Pontus.

==== Asia ====
- The Western Turks conquer the Oxus valley and cooperate with Heraclius against Persia, taking Khorasan (modern Afghanistan).

==== Central America ====
- March 28 – Tajoom Ukʼab Kʼahkʼ becomes the ruler of the Mayan city state of Calakmul in southern Mexico and reigns until 630.

=== By topic ===
==== Religion ====
- September 9 or June 17 – The Islamic prophet Muhammad secretly leaves his home in Mecca to make the Hijrah (emigrate) to Yathrib (later renamed by him Medina), along with his companion Abu Bakr. They take refuge in the Cave of Thawr south of Mecca for three days, departing on September 13 or June 21.
- September 20 or June 28 – Muhammad does not enter Yathrib directly, but stops at its outlying environs of Quba. He establishes the Quba Mosque here, the first mosque of Islam. On July 2 (or September 24) he makes his first visit to Yathrib for Friday prayers.
- October 4 or July 13 – After a fourteen days' stay in Quba, Muhammad finally moves from Quba to Yathrib, and is greeted cordially by its people. Here he drafts the Constitution of Medina, an agreement between the various Muslim, Jewish, Christian and pagan tribal communities in the city, forming the basis of a multi-religious Islamic state, and begins construction of the Al-Masjid an-Nabawi Mosque. Later during the caliphate of Umar in 638, the lunar year during which the emigration to Medina occurred (Friday 16 July 622 – 4 July 623) is designated "Year One" of the new Hijri era (Anno Hegirae – AH).
- Xuanzang is fully ordained as a Buddhist monk at the age of 20.

== Births ==
- Al-Mukhtar, Islamic revolutionary (d. 687)
- Bavo, Frankish nobleman and saint (d. 659)
- Mezezius, Byzantine usurper (d. 669)
- Uqba ibn Nafi, Arab general (d. 683)
- Xue Yuanchao, official of the Tang dynasty (d. 683)

== Deaths ==
- April 8 – Shōtoku, prince and regent of Japan (b. 574)
- April 11 – Luo Shixin, Tang dynasty general
- Andronicus, Coptic Orthodox Patriarch of Alexandria
- Colmán mac Cobthaig, king of Connacht (Ireland)
- John of Biclaro, Visigoth chronicler (approximate date)
- Li Zitong, rebel leader during the Sui dynasty
- Lin Shihong, rebel leader during the Sui dynasty
- Liu Wuzhou, rebel leader during the Sui dynasty
- Yin Kaishan, Tang dynasty general
- Walid ibn al-Mughirah, chief of the Banu Makhzum clan of the Quraysh tribe.
