= 630 =

Calendar year

630 in various calendars
- Gregorian calendar: 630; DCXXX
- Ab urbe condita: 1383
- Armenian calendar: 79; ԹՎ ՀԹ
- Assyrian calendar: 5380
- Balinese saka calendar: 551–552
- Bengali calendar: 36–37
- Berber calendar: 1580
- Buddhist calendar: 1174
- Burmese calendar: −8
- Byzantine calendar: 6138–6139
- Chinese calendar: 己丑年 (Earth Ox); 3327 or 3120 — to — 庚寅年 (Metal Tiger); 3328 or 3121
- Coptic calendar: 346–347
- Discordian calendar: 1796
- Ethiopian calendar: 622–623
- Hebrew calendar: 4390–4391
- Hindu calendars
- Vikram Samvat: 686–687
- Shaka Samvat: 551–552
- Kali Yuga: 3730–3731
- Holocene calendar: 10630
- Iranian calendar: 8–9
- Islamic calendar: 8–9
- Japanese calendar: N/A
- Javanese calendar: 520–521
- Julian calendar: 630; DCXXX
- Korean calendar: 2963
- Minguo calendar: 1282 before ROC 民前1282年
- Nanakshahi calendar: −838
- Seleucid era: 941/942 AG
- Thai solar calendar: 1172–1173
- Tibetan calendar: ས་མོ་གླང་ལོ་ (female Earth-Ox); 756 or 375 or −397 — to — ལྕགས་ཕོ་སྟག་ལོ་ (male Iron-Tiger); 757 or 376 or −396

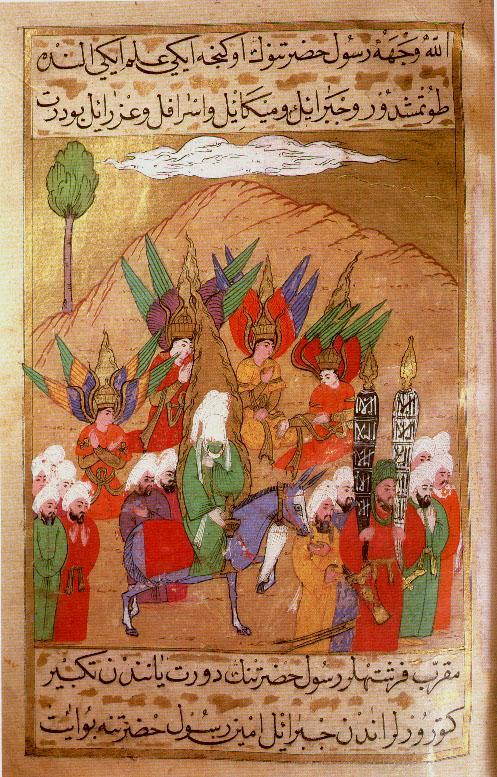
Muhammad (veiled face) advancing on Mecca

Year 630 (DCXXX) was a common year starting on Monday of the Julian calendar. The denomination 630 for this year has been used since the early medieval period, when the Anno Domini calendar era became the prevalent method in Europe for naming years.

== Events ==
=== By place ===
==== Byzantine Empire ====
- March 21 – Emperor Heraclius returns the True Cross, one of the holiest Christian relics, to Jerusalem. He tries to promote Monothelitism, which is rejected by the Christians.
- Heraclius issues a decree that all Jews must become Christian; a massacre follows around Jerusalem and in Galilee (Israel), some survivors fleeing to the Daraa area.
- Chorpan Tarkhan, general of the Khazars, invades and devastates Roman Armenia. He defeats a Persian cavalry force (10,000 men) sent by Shahrbaraz to repel the invasion.

==== Central America ====
- October 1 – Tajoom Ukʼab Kʼahkʼ, the ruler of the Mayan city state of Calakmul in southern Mexico dies after a reign of eight years and is succeeded by Cauac, who reigns until 636.

==== Scandinavia ====
- Yngling King Olof Trätälja founds a colony in Värmland. He is expelled from his native Västergötland (in modern-day Sweden) (according to the Ynglingatal).

==== Britain ====
- King Ricberht of East Anglia dies and is succeeded by Sigeberht, who returns from exile in France. He rules together with his kinsman Ecgric, re-establishing Christianity.
- King Penda of Mercia besieges Exeter in southwest England. King Cadwallon ap Cadfan of Gwynedd lands with a force nearby, and negotiates an alliance with Penda.
- Eanswith, daughter of King Eadbald of Kent, founds the Benedictine Folkestone Priory, the first nunnery in England.

==== Persia ====
- April 27 – King Ardashir III, age 9, is murdered after an 18 month reign. He is succeeded by Shahrbaraz who becomes ruler (shah) of the Sasanian Empire.
- June 9 – Shahrbaraz is killed and succeeded by Borandukht, daughter of former king Khosrow II. She ascends the throne as 26th monarch of Persia, before being deposed in favour of Shapur-i Shahrvaraz, whose brief reign is then followed by that of her sister Azarmidokht.

==== Arabia ====
- January – Battle of Hunayn: Muhammad defeats the Bedouin tribe of Hawazin (12,000 men) in a valley, on one of the roads leading to Ta'if (Western Arabia).
- February 5 – Siege of Ta'if: Muhammad begins to besiege Ta'if and brings battering rams and catapults to suppress the fortress city, but is unable to penetrate it.
- December 11 – Conquest of Mecca: A Muslim army (10,000 men) marches on Mecca, which surrenders. Muhammad takes the city from the Quraysh

==== Asia ====
- Illig Qaghan, ruler (khagan) of the Eastern Turkic Khaganate, is captured by Li Jing during the Tang campaign against the Eastern Turks.

=== By topic ===
==== Religion ====
- Xuanzang, Chinese Buddhist monk (bhikkhu), travels across the Gobi Desert to Kumul. Following the Tian Shan mountain range of Central Asia westwards, he arrives in Turpan.

== Births ==
- November 7 – Constans II, Byzantine emperor (d. 668)
- Alhfrith, king of Deira (approximate date)
- Conon I, pope of the Catholic Church (approximate date)
- Di Renjie, chancellor of the Tang dynasty (d. 700)
- Fausta, Byzantine empress (approximate date)
- Nukata, Japanese poet (approximate date)
- Reineldis, Frankisch saint (approximate date)
- Sigebert III, king of Austrasia (approximate date)

== Deaths ==
- April 27 – Ardashir III, king of the Persian Empire
- June 9 – Shahrbaraz, king of the Persian Empire
- Du Ruhui, chancellor of the Tang dynasty (b. 585)
- Ricberht, king of East Anglia (approximate date)
