= Bolon Kʼawiil II =

Bolon Kʼawiil II was a Maya king of Calakmul (>771-789?>). His monuments are Stelae 57 and 58 in his city.

Stele 88, an AD 751 monument of the just-previous ruler apparently depicting his queen, carries a mention of Bolon Kʼawiil; the same name appears on a block of hieroglyphic stairway recently recovered from Structure 13, dating to just after 751. This is apparently the same Bolon Kʼawiil who erected Stelae 57 and 58 on the east side of Structure 13 to mark 9.17.0.0.0—the end of the seventeenth kʼatun—in 771.

== Etymology ==
This king was named after the principal deity of the Maya royal lines. This was God K, who personifies the lightning axe of the rain deity. Bolon means "nine."

== Bibliography ==
- Chronicle of the Maya Kings and Queens by Simon Martin and Nikolai Grube
