= Sky Witness (ruler) =

Ut Chanal (Sky Witness)
- Ajaw

King of Calakmul/Dzibanche
- Reign: 561–572
- Predecessor: Tuun Kʼabʼ Hix
- Successor: Yax Yopaat
- Born: Dzibanche
- Died: 572; Dzibanche
- Issue: Yax Yopaat; Uneh Chan; Lady Ch'ak Ch'een, Queen of Cobá (possibly); Lady Na Chaʼak Kab, Queen of Yo'okop (possibly)
- House: Snake dynasty
- Father: Tuun Kʼabʼ Hix (possibly)
- Mother: Lady Ek' Naah (possibly)
- Religion: Maya religion

Sky Witness was a ruler of the Maya city and major cultural center of Calakmul, also known as Kaan.

He took the rulership some time prior to the year 561, and led Kaan into a war with rival Maya city-state Tikal (also known as Mutal), winning a major victory in 562 which broke Mutal's formerly extensive power in the southern Yucatán Peninsula for some decades.
