= Yax Yopaat =

- Ajaw

King of Calakmul/Dzibanche
- Reign: 572-579
- Predecessor: Ut Chanal
- Successor: Uneh Chan
- Born: Dzibanche
- Died: 572; Dzibanche
- House: Snake dynasty
- Father: Ut Chanal
- Religion: Maya religion

Yax Yopaat was a Maya king of the Kaan kingdom (Calakmul) who ruled AD 572-579.

His life is mostly a mystery for us today.

A monument at Dzibanche records the celebration of the 9.7.0.0.0 k'atun ending by Yax Yopaat in AD 572; his name also appears on a carved slate mirror-back. As Sky Witness is thought to have died in 572 and Scroll Serpent acceded in 579, this king would have reigned for about six years.
