= Scroll Serpent =

Ruler of the Kaan kingdom from 579 to 611

Uneh Chan (Scroll Serpent)
- Ajaw

King of Calakmul/Dzibanche
- Reign: 2 September 579 – 611
- Predecessor: Yax Yopaat
- Successor: Yuknoom Ti' Chan
- Born: Dzibanche
- Died: 611; Dzibanche
- Spouse: Lady Scroll-in-Hand?
- Issue: Yuknoom Ti' Chan; Tajoom Uk'ab K'ahk'; Yuknoom Head; Yuknoom Ch'een II
- House: Snake dynasty
- Father: Ut Chanal
- Religion: Maya religion

Scroll Serpent (Uneh Chan) was a Maya ruler of the Kaan kingdom. He ruled from AD 579 to 611. He acceded on 2 September.

== Reign ==
Inscriptions at Palenque record two long-range attacks by Kaan during the reign of this powerful king in the years following the eclipse of Tikal's power and the ascendency of the Snake kingdom. In the dry season of AD 599 and then again 611 his forces crossed the Usumacinta River and struck Lakamha', the very center of Palenque.

Scroll Serpent maintained an existing relationship by overseeing an action of Yajaw Te' K'inich II of Caracol at some point before 583.

There are no Scroll Serpent monuments at Calakmul today.

Scroll Serpent's celebration of the 9.8.0.0.0 k'atun ending is recorded on both Stela 8 and Stela 33. Stela 33, erected by Yuknoom the Great in 657, appears to combine the focus on Scroll Serpent with a statement of Yuknoom the Great's birth in 600, suggesting that he was a son of Scroll Serpent. If so, the three rulers who intervened between Scroll Serpent and Yuknoom the Great – Yuknoom Ti' Chan, Tajoom Uk'ab K'ahk' and Yuknoom Head – might also have been sons of Scroll Serpent.

That Scroll Serpent erected no monuments of his own at Calakmul is suggested by the retrospective references to his activities by Yuknoom Ch’een II and Yuknoom Took' K'awiil, given that there are more likely to be accounts of the activities of previous rulers when their own accounts are not in evidence. An absence of Scroll Serpent’s monuments at Calakmul is consistent with the hypothesis that the Kaan dynasty was located elsewhere at this time, perhaps at Dzibanche.

Scroll Serpent’s logistical achievement in attacking Lakamha’ was all the more impressive since it quite possibly originated even further away from Palenque than the eventual capital of the Kaan kingdom in Calakmul. During the reign of Scroll Serpent, Kaan may have been centered at Dzibanche.

Scroll Serpent's wife was possibly Lady Scroll-in-Hand.
