= Great Serpent =

Yax Chit K’ahk’ ...? Witz' Naah Chan/Kan, before also known as Great Serpent, Ruler 8 and Ruler Z., was a Maya king of Calakmul, a Maya city-state.

The unfinished Stele 62 marked the completion of the sixteenth k'atun in AD 751; the commissioning ruler's name is damaged but appears to be different from that of previous kings. His emblem glyph features the head of a bat rather than that of a snake, hearkening back to the Bat emblem last attested at Calakmul over three centuries earlier on Stela 114. Stela 62 may have formed a king-queen portrait pair with Stela 88 from the same date.
