= Ix Ekʼ Naah =

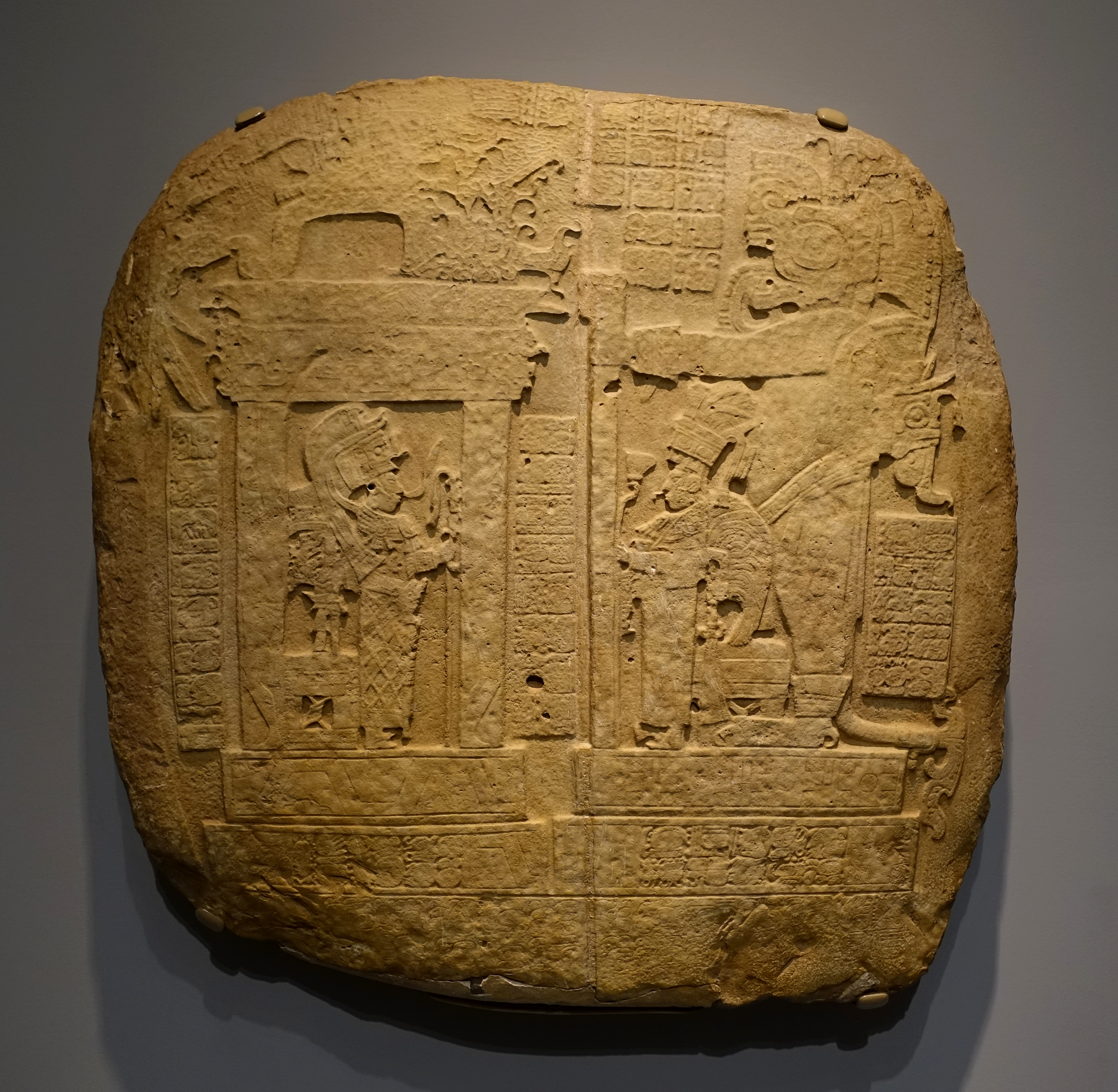
Panel 6 of La Corona (Lady Naah Ekʼ on the right)

Ix Naah Ekʼ ("Lady House Star "), was a Maya princess of the Kaan kingdom. She was a daughter of Lady Bʼakabʼ and King Tuun Kʼabʼ Hix, who traveled to La Corona to marry a lord of that site in 520.

== See also ==
- Women in Maya society
- Maya rulers
