= Yuknoom Head =

- Ajaw

King of Calakmul
- Reign: 630-636
- Predecessor: Tajoom Uk'ab K'ahk'
- Successor: Yuknoom Ch'een II
- Born: Calakmul
- Died: 636; Calakmul
- House: Snake dynasty
- Father: Uneh Chan
- Mother: Lady Scroll-in-Hand
- Religion: Maya religion

Yuknoom Head (Cauac Head) was a king of the Maya Kaan Kingdom (also known as the Snake Kingdom). He ruled AD 630-636.

== Reign ==
The campaign to reassert Kaan’s hegemony over Naranjo after its defection following the death of faithful sublord Aj Wosal Chan K'inich seems to have been initiated by Yuknoom Head’s predecessor Tajoom Uk'ab K'ahk'. A probable sponsor of two Naranjo defeats by Snake client K'an II of Caracol, Tajoom Uk’ab K’ahk' himself was involved in what might have been a related warfare event in AD 627, but it was Yuknoom Head who took direct and decisive action with a "star war" conquest of Naranjo in 631.

The record of this military victory, carved on Naranjo Hieroglyphic Stairway 1, calls Yuknoom Head the kaanal ajaw ta uxte'tuun - "the Kaan lord at Uxte'tuun", this being the ancient place name of Calakmul. A reasonable inference is that previous Snake kings were based elsewhere (perhaps at Dzibanche).

A second military success, this one against an unknown site, was achieved by Yuknoom Head in 636.

Stelae 76 and 78 can be attributed to Yuknoom Head although they are eroded.
