= Chinikiha =

Maya archaeological site in Mexico

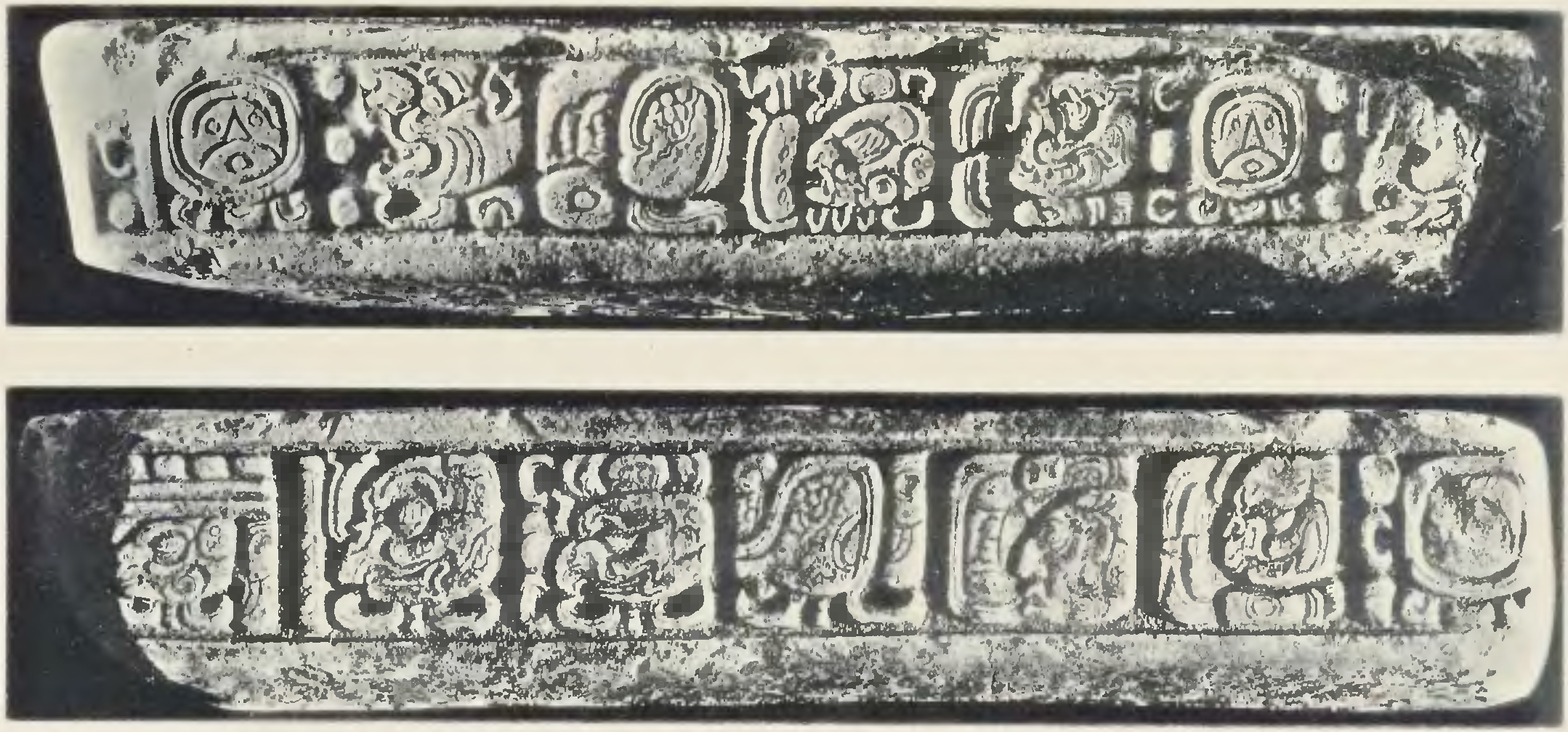
- Maya inscriptions on the Chinikiha stone altar

- Location within Chiapas
- 17°25′11″N 91°39′6″W
- Type: Ancient Maya city
- Periods: Classic
- Cultures: Maya civilization
- Location: Mexico
- Region: Chiapas

History
- Built: 250 AC
- Abandoned: 900 AC

Site notes
- Discovered: 1889

Chinikiha is a large Maya archaeological site from the Classic period located in the Usumacinta basin region in the Mexican state of Chiapas. Chinikiha is located between the Maya sites of Palenque and Pomoná and was during the Classic period a major Maya city and the capital of an important dynasty with great power over the Palenque and Usumacinta region.

== Architecture ==
Over 120 structures have been identified in the area of Chinikiha, the architecture and edifications includes monumental buildings, temples, pyramids, altars, plazas and a main temple along with a ball game court, visible remains of mural painting are located over some walls. The size and quality of Chinikiha's architecture demonstrates the importance and power it managed to develop and achieve during its occupation.

== History ==
One of the inscriptions on the throne of Chinikiha records the Mesoamerican long count date of 9.7.0.0.0, 7 Ajaw, 3 K'ank'in, marking the end of a k’atun cycle, this date corresponds to December 5, 573 AD. It also records that 20 days later an ajaw from Toniná was captured, this being the earliest mention to Toniná outside from the city.

A fragment from a Chinikiha stela records that a ruler identified as Aj Tok’ Ti’ ascended to the throne of the city on the Mayan calendar date 7 Ok 13 Pop, this date is equivalent to March 14, 599 AD.

Chinikiha was discovered in 1889 by archaeologist Teobert Maler as part of an archaeological expedition over the Usumacinta river, during his research he registered some of the visible buildings and monuments from the site along with some Maya inscriptions carved on a stone altar.

== Rulers of Chinikiha ==
- K’inich B’ah Tok'
- Aj Tok' Ti'
