= Yuknoom Tiʼ Chan =

- Ajaw

King of Calakmul
- Reign: c.619
- Predecessor: Scroll Serpent
- Successor: Tajoom Uk'ab K'ahk'
- Born: Calakmul
- Died: c.619? Calakmul
- House: Snake dynasty
- Father: Scroll Serpent
- Mother: Lady Scroll-in-Hand
- Religion: Maya religion

Yuknoom Tiʼ Chan was a king of Maya Kaan kingdom. He ruled in 619.

He is known only from a single inscription where he is said to have supervised Kʼan II of Caracol in some no-longer-legible event in 619.
