= Yuknoom Chʼeen II =

Yuknoom Che'en II
- Ajaw
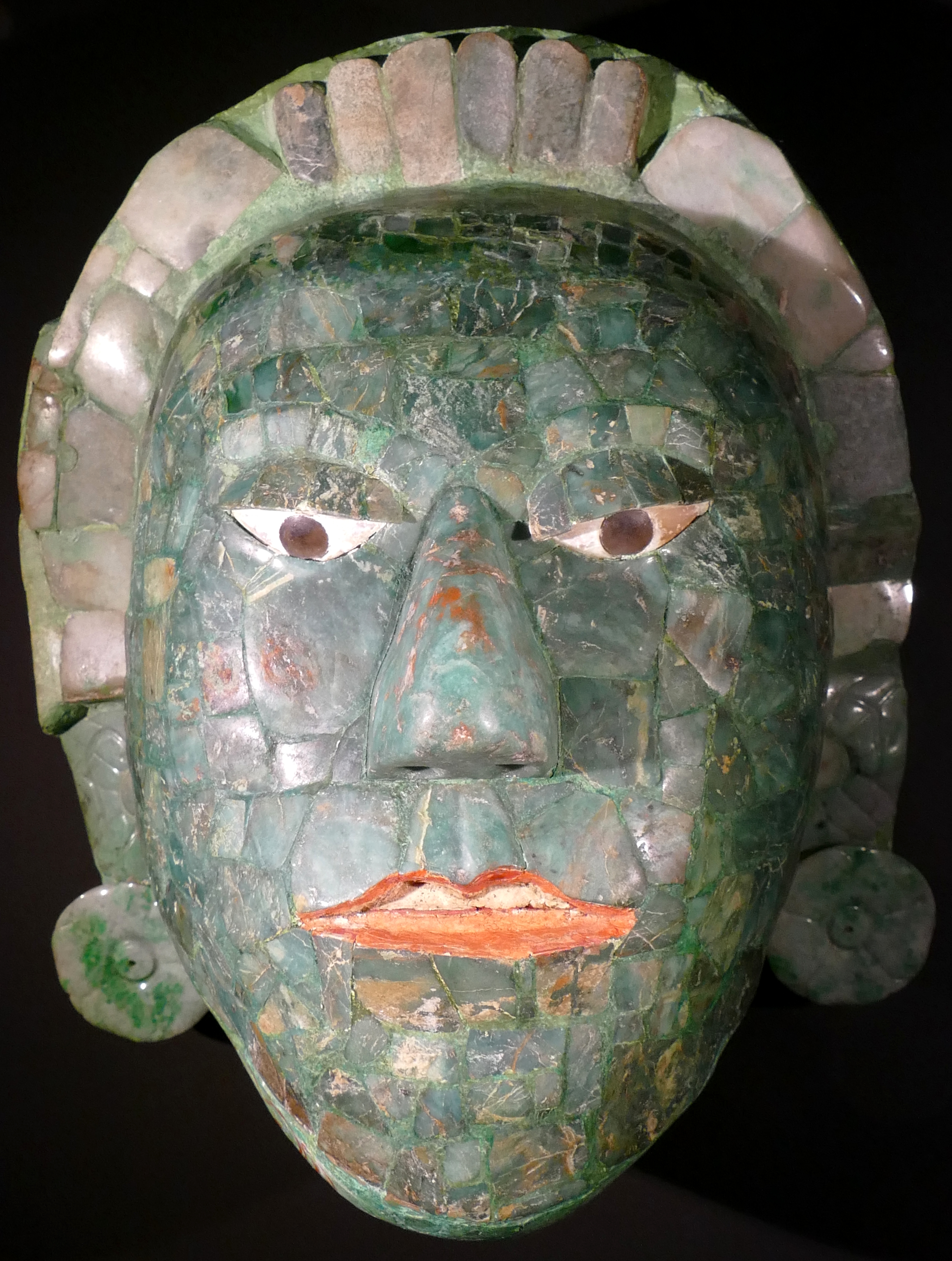
- Funerary mask of Yuknoom Ch'een II

King of Calakmul
- Reign: 1 May 636 - 686
- Predecessor: Yuknoom Head
- Successor: Yuknoom Yichʼaak Kʼahkʼ
- Born: 11 September 600; Calakmul
- Died: 686 (aged 85–86); Calakmul
- Issue: Yuknoom Yichʼaak Kʼahkʼ; Lady K'abel, Queen of El Perú; A daughter, Queen of La Corona; U-Hand K'inich
- House: Snake dynasty
- Father: Scroll Serpent
- Mother: Lady Scroll-in-Hand
- Religion: Maya religion

Yuknoom Chʼeen II (September 11, 600 – 680s), known as Yuknoom the Great, was a Maya ruler of the Kaan kingdom, which had its capital at Calakmul during the Classic Period of Mesoamerican chronology.

== Biography ==
=== Birth ===
Yuknoom was born on September 11, 600. His parents were possibly King Scroll Serpent and his wife, Lady Scroll-in-hand.

=== Reign ===
As he acceded in AD 636 and his successor followed him upon the throne in 686, Yuknoom the Great is known to have ruled the Kaan kingdom for fifty years during the height of its power and ascendency over Tikal. He took the name of the Early Classic king Yuknoom Chʼeen I upon his accession.

As Tikal was showing strong signs of recovering from the defeat of its king Wak Chan Kʼawiil almost one hundred years earlier, Yuknoom exerted himself against Kaan's great rival; he accomplished this in the context of a division in Tikal's dynastic line whereby both Bʼalaj Chan Kʼawiil of Dos Pilas and his probable brother (or half-brother) Nuun Ujol Chaak of Tikal came to style themselves holy lords of Mutal. The initial circumstances of the relationship between Dos Pilas and Tikal are murky, but in 650 Bajlaj Chan Kʼawiil was attacked and driven from his city, and he came to acknowledge the Snake ruler as his overlord and ally in the factional dispute with Tikal.

In 657 Yuknoom Chʼeen turned his attention to Tikal and vanquished it in a "star war" encounter, as a consequence of which Nuun Ujol Chaak must have pledged some form of fealty, because both he and Bajlaj Chan Kʼawiil subsequently attended a ritual performed by Calakmul prince Yuknoom Yichʼaak Kʼahkʼ. But then in 672 the Tikal king asserted his independence by ousting Bajlaj Chan Kʼawiil from Dos Pilas and pursuing him as he sought refuge at other sites. Calakmul then intervened in 677 and dealt Nuun Ujol Chaak a second defeat, which was followed in 679 by a decisive vanquishment at the hands of Dos Pilas, almost certainly with Calakmul aid.

The following year brought turmoil to another region of Kaan's hegemony; Naranjo, which had defected from its vassal status after the death of Aj Wosal Chan Kʼinich and had been punished by the defeat of its thirty-sixth ruler, had recovered sufficiently for the thirty-seventh to attack Kaan's client Caracol. Retribution seems to have followed swiftly, however, as the royal lineage of Naranjo was terminated within two years, ultimately to be replaced by the grandson of Bajlaj Chan Kʼawiil.

Yuknoom Chʼeen's superordinate status was recognized in inscriptions at a number of sites, while it is probable that a great many other such mentions are lost to us. He sponsored three generations of Cancuen rulers and oversaw the accessions of two of them in 656 and 677. And far to the west of Calakmul, the accession of a king at Moral-Reforma in 662 took place under the auspices of Kaan, an event apparently coordinated with an attack by Piedras Negras on Moral-Reforma's neighbor Santa Elena that same year — an inscription at Piedras Negras mentions Calakmul six days before this event. An emissary of Yuknoom Chʼeen also supervised a ritual at Piedras Negras in 685.

Yuknoom the Great was well into his eighties when he died, and it is likely that many of the successes of his later years were actually the achievements of his successor, Yuknoom Yichʼaak Kʼahkʼ.

Relations with La Corona were enhanced when a daughter of Yuknoom Chʼeen married a lord of that site in 679.
