= Ix Ch'ak Ch'een =

Queen of Cobá
- Reign: Before May 12th, 569 - After December 8th, 573
- Religion: Maya religion

Ix Ch’ak Ch’een, also known as Ix Ch’ak Ch’een Yopaat, was the Mayan queen of Cobá who lived during the 6th century.

Her existence was proven in 2025 after the deciphering of inscriptions found in 2024 during work carried out by the National Institute of Anthropology and History of Mexico at the “Foundation Rock monument: a part of the Nohoch Mul group that also belongs the tallest pyramid of Cobá.

She was called "Ch'een" or "Ch'en Nal" or "Che'enal" until 2025, when her name, "Ch'ak Ch'een", was revealed.
