= Tajoom Ukʼab Kʼahkʼ =

Tajoom Uk'ab K'ahk'
- Ajaw

King of Calakmul
- Reign: 28 March 622 - 1 October 630
- Predecessor: Yuknoom Tiʼ Chan
- Successor: Yuknoom Head
- Born: Calakmul
- Died: 1 October 630; Calakmul
- House: Snake dynasty
- Father: Uneh Chan
- Mother: Lady Scroll-in-Hand
- Religion: Maya religion

Tajoom Ukʼab Kʼahkʼ (Ta Batzʼ) (died October 1, 630) was a Maya ruler of the Kaan kingdom. He became a king on March 28, 622.

== Reign ==
This ruler's accession is recorded on Caracol Stela 22. It is not known where the event took place, and it may have been before the Kaan polity became centered at Calakmul. Stelae 28 and 29, the first Late Classic monuments at that site, date to AD 623, but the names of the royal couple depicted do not survive, nor is there any sign of the snake-head emblem glyph of Kaan.

At some point following the demise of Aj Wosal Chan Kʼinich in about 615, Naranjo repudiated the long-standing overlordship of the Snake kingdom. This may have come about as the result of the death of the powerful Kaan monarch Scroll Serpent and the temptation of client states to test the mettle of his successors. It may have taken place under Tajoom Ukʼab Kʼahk's immediate predecessor Yuknoom Tiʼ Chan, who is known to have been on the throne by 619. It almost certainly had taken place by 626, in Tajoom Ukʼab Kʼahkʼ's fourth year of reign, when Kaan client Caracol waged two victorious battles against Naranjo.

Tajoom Ukʼab Kʼahkʼ himself may have been involved in a warfare event the following year, but any efforts to rein in the rebellious Naranjo were cut short by his death in 630. Like his accession, his demise is recorded at Caracol, where an inscription also records a gift that he made to the Caracol ruler in 627.
