= Chorpan Tarkhan =

King of Khazaria

Chorpan Tarkhan is recorded by Moses of Kalankatuyk as a Khazar general, who conquered Armenia in April 630. He was most likely an officer in the army of the Western Turkic Khaganate led by Böri Shad in the wake of Ziebel's (or Tong Yabghu Qaghan's) victory in the Perso-Turkic war of 627–629. Chorpan Tarkhan ambushed and killed a 10,000-strong Persian cavalry force sent by Shahrbaraz to contain the invasion.
