= La Corona =

Archeological site

Coordinates: 17°31′11″N 90°22′20″W

- Sak-Nikte'; Site Q'
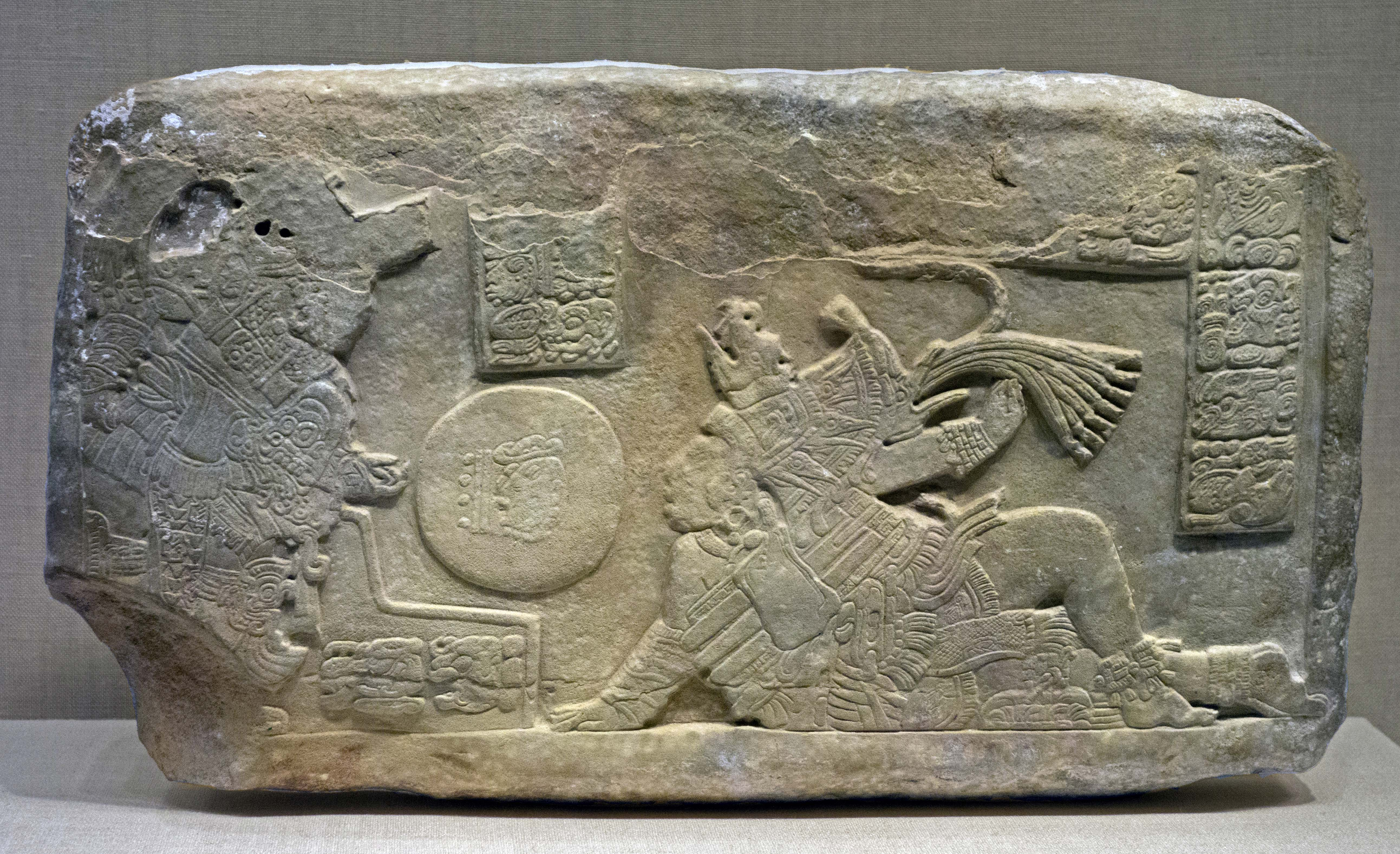
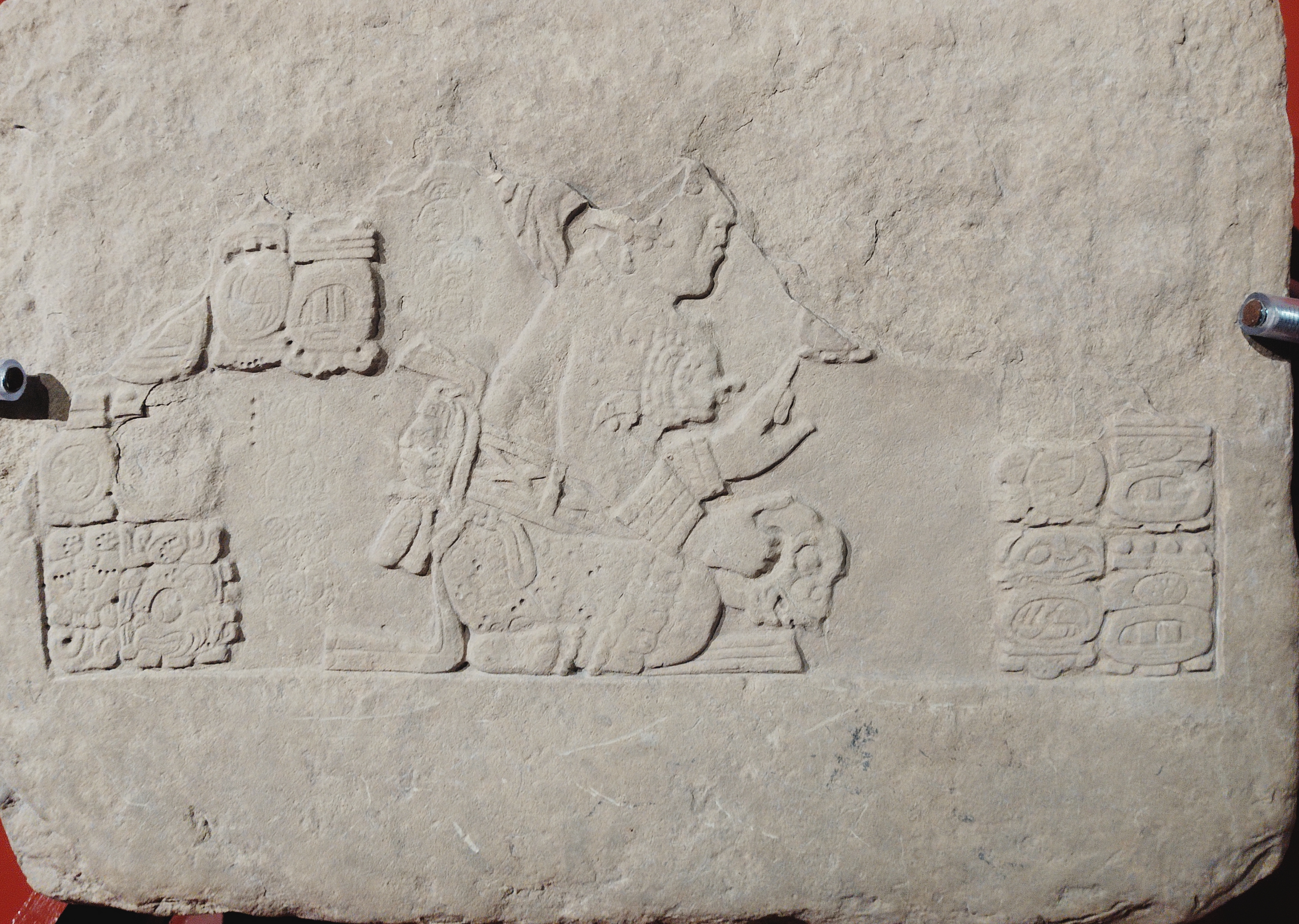
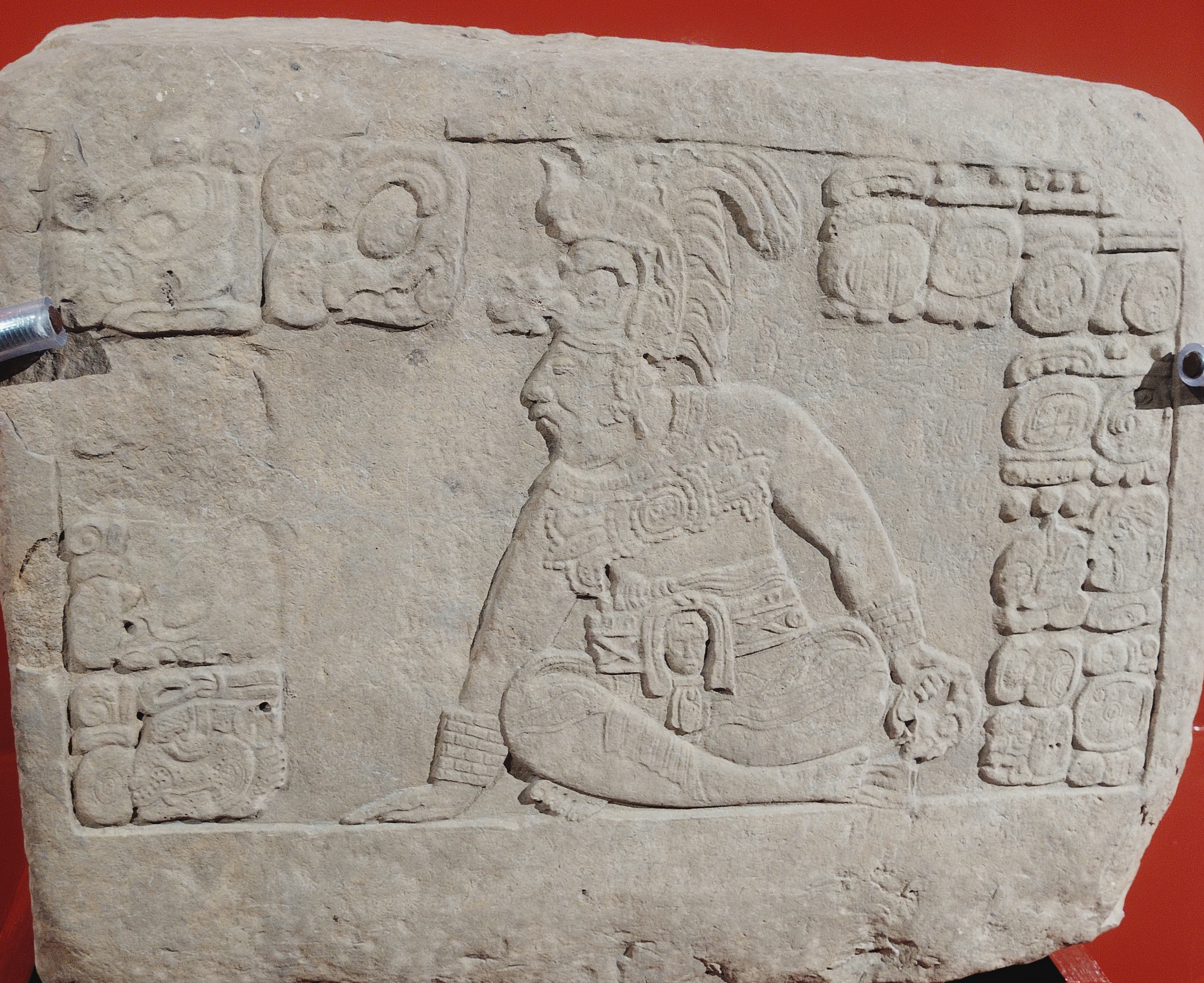
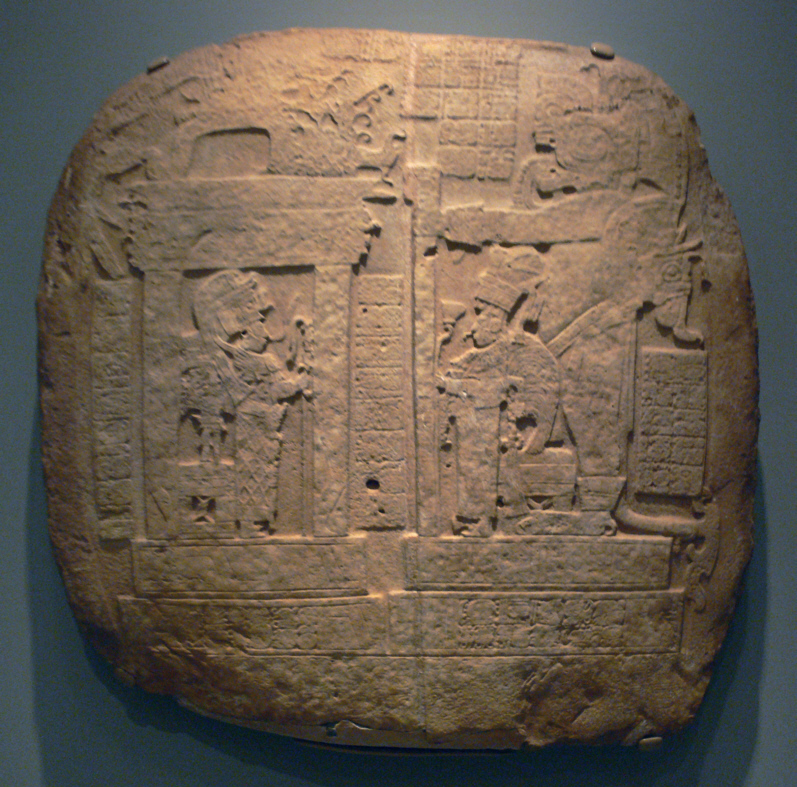
- Limestone staircase depicting a ball game scene featuring King Chak Ak'aach Yuk, April 2, 687 AD. Block 7 hieroglyphic staircase 2 Block 8 hieroglyphic staircase 2 Panel 6 celebrating an extensive history of intermarriage between the rulers of The Crown and the royal women of the Kanuul Serpent's court.

- Location within Guatemala
- Periods: Early Classic and Terminal Classic Periods
- Cultures: Maya
- Location: San Andrés
- Region: Petén Department, Guatemala

History
- Built: Early Classic 250 A.D. C. Approx
- Abandoned: Terminal Classic 900 A.D.C. Approx

Site notes
- Architectural style: Classic Maya
- Excavation dates: 1996
- Responsible body: IDAEH

SMU graduate student Stanley Guenter cleans a panel of Maya glyphs discovered at La Corona. This particular panel helped point to La Corona as the long-sought "Site Q". The panel's left side depicts king K'inich Yook of Sak Nikte'.

La Corona is the name given by archaeologists to an ancient Maya court residence in Guatemala's Petén department that was discovered in 1996, and later identified as the long-sought "Site Q", the source of a long series of unprovenanced limestone reliefs of exceptional artistic quality. The site's Classical name appears to have been Sak-Nikte' ('White-Flower').

== The search for 'Site Q' ==
During the 1960s, looted Maya reliefs from a then-unknown city surfaced on the international art market. One of these reliefs, showing a ball player, is now in the Chicago Art Institute; another is in the Dallas Museum of Art. Peter Mathews, then a Yale graduate student, dubbed the city "Site Q" (short for ¿Qué? [Spanish for "what?"]).

"La Corona was located in February 1996 when a jaguar poacher and looter turned eco-tourism promoter named Carlos Catalán led Santiago Billy, a researcher on a Conservation International campaign to protect scarlet macaws, to the heavily looted site"

Ian Graham and David Stuart from Harvard University's Peabody Museum of Archaeology and Ethnology investigated the site the following year, naming the new site La Corona. Among the broken sculptures left by looters, Stuart found textual references to a place name and to historical figures that were featured on Site Q artifacts, leading him to believe that La Corona was Site Q.

In 2005 Marcello A. Canuto, then a Yale professor, found a panel in situ at La Corona that mentioned two Site Q rulers. The panel had been quarried from the same rock as the Site Q artifacts, providing convincing evidence that La Corona was indeed Site Q.

== Recent research ==
Since 2008, the site has been investigated by the La Corona Archaeological Project co-directed by Marcello A. Canuto (Director, Middle American Research Institute at Tulane University and Tomás Barrientos, Universidad del Valle de Guatemala.

In April 2012, La Corona Archaeological Project discovered a row of 12 staircase risers with many different relief scenes; another 10 sculpted risers were found looted from their original context but then discarded for being too eroded to be worth selling on the illicit antiquities market.

The texts of these newly discovered panels contain important historical information about political events in the Classic period; one of the panels (Hieroglyphic Staircase 2, Block 5) contains a reference to 4 Ahau 3 K'ank'in, the notorious 13th baktun-ending.

== La Corona and its history ==
Research focuses on the relationship between the powerful kingdom of Calakmul and La Corona.

A famous sculpted panel (now in the Dallas Museum of Art) depicts two large palanquins each carrying a royal woman from Calakmul, one standing in a temple pavilion, the other overshadowed by a supernatural protector; the text, however, refers to three women who came from Calakmul's ruling dynasty to marry the kings of La Corona.

In 679 AD, a daughter of Calakmul's powerful Yuknoom Ch'een was given in marriage to a La Corona king. Another, newly discovered relief mentions a visit in between these two dates, in 696, by another Calakmul king (Yuknoom Yich'aak K'ahk'), following Calakmul's defeat by Tikal.

In 721 AD, a daughter of the Calakmul king (Yuknoom Took' K'awiil) was married off to a king of La Corona.

== Sources ==
- Katz, Abram (2005). "Long-Sought Maya City Found in Guatemala". National Geographic News. Archived from the original on 10 November 2005.

- Katz, Abram (2005). "Page 2: Long-Sought Maya City Found in Guatemala". National Geographic News. Archived from the original on 22 October 2005.
