= Kʼatun =

Unit of time in the Mayan calendar equal to 7200 days (~20 years)

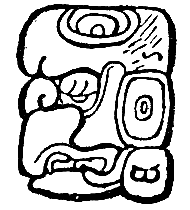
Katun Glyph

A kʼatun (/ˈkɑːtuːn/, Mayan pronunciation: [kʼaˈtun]) is a unit of time in the Maya calendar equal to 20 tuns or 7200 days, equivalent to 19.713 tropical years. It is the second digit on the normal Maya long count date. For example, in the Maya Long Count date 12.19.13.15.12 (December 5, 2006), the number 19 is the kʼatun. There are 20 k'atuns in a baktun.

The end of a kʼatun was marked by numerous ceremonies and, at Tikal, the construction of large twin pyramid complexes to host them. The kʼatun was also used to reckon the age of rulers. Those who lived to see four (or five) kʼatuns would take the title 4-(or 5-)kʼatun ruler. In the Postclassic period when the full Long Count gave way to the Short Count, the Maya continued to keep a reckoning of kʼatuns, differentiating them by the Calendar Round date on which they began. Each kʼatun had its own set of prophecies and associations.
