= Ajaw =

Pre-Columbian Maya political title

Ajaw or Ahau /ɑːˈxaʊ/ ('Lord') is a pre-Columbian Maya political title attested from epigraphic inscriptions. It is also the name of the 20th day of the tzolkʼin, the Maya divinatory calendar, on which a ruler's kʼatun-ending rituals would fall.

Logogram for the 20th named-day of the Tzolkin Maya calendar cycle, Ajaw (this version is typical of many monumental inscriptions)

== Background ==
The word is known from several Mayan languages both those in pre-Columbian use (such as in Classic Maya), as well as in their contemporary descendant languages (in which there may be observed some slight variations). "Ajaw" is the modernised orthography in the standard revision of Mayan orthography, put forward in 1994 by the Guatemalan Academia de Lenguas Mayas, and now widely adopted by Mayanist scholars. Before this standardisation, it was more commonly written as "Ahau", following the orthography of 16th-century Yucatec Maya in Spanish transcriptions (now Yukatek in the modernised style).

In the Maya hieroglyphics writing system, the representation of the word ajaw could be as either a logogram, or spelled-out syllabically. In either case, quite a few glyphic variants are known. A picture of the ruler sometimes substitutes for the more abstract day sign.

== Meaning ==
Ajaw denoted any of the leading class of nobles in a particular polity. It was not limited to a single individual, with a meaning variously rendered as "leader", "ruler", "lord", "king", or "queen", depending on the individual. Since the ajaw performed religious activities, it also designated a member of the Maya priesthood. The variant kʼuhul ajaw ("divine lord") indicates a sovereign leader of a polity, although the extent of the territory and influence controlled by an ajaw varied considerably, and kʼuhul ajaw could also be applied to persons who, in theory, recognised the overlordship of another person, dynasty, or state. When the title was given to women rulers, such as K'awiil Ajaw (640–681 AD) of Coba, the term was sometimes prefixed with the sign Ix ("woman") to indicate their gender.

== Earliest evidence ==
The archaeological site of Kʼo, associated with the Classic Maya city of Holmul located in modern-day Guatemala, boasts what may be the royal tomb of the earliest-known Mayan ruler. This tomb has been dated to 350–300 BC. It contains the earliest evidence of the institution of ajaw in the Maya Lowlands.

== See also ==
- Halach Uinik
