= List of Mesoamerican pyramids =

This is a list of Mesoamerican pyramids or ceremonial structures. In most cases they are not true pyramids. There are hundreds of these in many different styles throughout Mexico and Central America. These were made by several pre-Columbian cultures including the Olmecs, Maya, Toltecs, and Aztecs. In most cases they were made by city states that created many structures in the same style. The style for each city state is usually different. These are usually made out of stone and mortar but some of the earliest may have been made out of clay.

Site	Name of pyramid	Culture	Base length (m)	Height (m)	Incli- nation	Approximate time of construction	Function	Notes	Image
Altun Ha Belize	Temple of the Masonry Altars	Maya		16		200 to 900 CE			
Cañada de la Virgen Mexico	Pirámide Chichimeca de los 7 Cielos	Otomi		15+		540 to 1040 CE	The Pyramids and surrounding complex were built to house priests, along with serving as a burial ground.	These are the only Otomi pyramids we currently know of.	
Caracol Belize	Caana	Maya		43				A triadic pyramid, Caana is the highest man-made structure in Belize	
Caracol Belize	Temple of the Wooden Lintel	Maya							
Lamanai Belize	High Temple	Maya		33		Pre-Classic Period			
Lamanai Belize	Jaguar Temple	Maya		20		Pre-Classic Period			
Lamanai Belize	Mask Temple	Maya		17		Early Classic Period			
Lubaantun Belize		Maya				730 to 890 CE		Lubaantun's structures are mostly built of large stone blocks with no mortar, using primarily black slate rather than limestone.	
Tula Mexico	Pyramid B	Toltec						The pyramid is dedicated to Quetzalcoatl, and topped with Atlantean columns, carved like warriors.	
Lubaantun Belize		Maya				730 to 890 CE		Lubaantun includes many small step pyramids in addition to its far larger one.	
Nim Li Punit Belize	Building	Maya		12		400 to 800 CE		Nim Li Punit has several small-step pyramids, but none that possessed the sheer mass of other examples.	
Xunantunich Belize	El Castillo	Maya		40		600 to 900 CE			
San Andrés El Salvador	the Bell of San Andrés	Maya				600 to 900 CE		This is a scale model of structure 5. There are several other smaller structures that may be similar to pyramids on the site.	
Tazumal El Salvador	Pyramid B1-1	Maya				250 to 900 CE			
Aguateca Guatemala		Maya		6		760 to 830 CE		This temple pyramid was left unfinished when the city was abandoned. Its purpose is still unknown.	
Dos Pilas Guatemala	LD-49	Maya		20		after 629 CE		This pyramid's main stairway (known as Hieroglyphic Stairway 2) contains at least eighteen hieroglyphic steps. However, some glyphs are undecipherable due to age.	
Dos Pilas Guatemala		Maya				after 629 CE		This temple pyramid was built by enlarging and terracing a natural hill some way from the site core, giving the impression of a single massive structure.	
Kaminaljuyu Guatemala		Maya				250 CE		Kaminaljuyu contains some 200 platforms and pyramidal mounds, at least half of which were made before 250 CE. Some were used to hold temples.	
El Mirador Guatemala	La Danta	Maya		72		300 BCE to 100 CE		La Danta pyramid temple has an estimated volume of 2,800,000 cubic meters, making it one of the largest pyramids in the world.	
El Mirador Guatemala	El Tigre	Maya		55		300 BCE to 100 CE			
Mixco Viejo Guatemala		Maya				1100 to 1500 CE			
Tikal Guatemala	Temple I	Maya		47					
Copán Honduras		Maya						Copán has several overlapping step-pyramids.	
El Puente Honduras	Structure 1	Maya		12		600 BCE- 900 CE		Religious temple	
Acanceh Mexico		Maya		11					
Becán Mexico	Structure IX	Maya		42					
Bonampak Mexico	The Temple of the Murals	Maya				580 to 800 CE			
Calakmul Mexico	Structure I	Maya		40					
Calakmul Mexico	The Great Pyramid - Structure II	Maya		55		400 BC - 800 CE			
Castillo de Teayo Mexico	Castillo de Teayo	Huastec		11					
Chacchoben Mexico	Temple 1	Maya		20					
Chakanbakán Mexico	Nohochbalam	Maya							
Chichen Itza Mexico	El Castillo (Temple of Kukulcan)	Maya	55.3	30					
Chichen Itza Mexico	Temple of the Warriors	Maya		12		1200 CE			
Chichen Itza Mexico	Ossuary	Maya		10					
Chinkultic Mexico		Maya				600 to 900 CE			
Cholula Mexico	The Great Pyramid of Cholula		450 sq.	66		300 BCE - 800 CE		The largest pyramid and the largest manmade monument anywhere in the Americas.	
Coba Mexico	Nohoch Mul	Maya		42		500 to 900 CE			
Coba Mexico	La Iglesia	Maya		20		500 to 900 CE			
Coba Mexico	Crossroads Temple	Maya				500 to 900 CE			
Comalcalco Mexico	Temple 1	Maya		20		600 CE to 900 CE		The city's buildings were made from fired-clay bricks with mortar made from oyster shells, unique among Maya sites. Many are decorated with iconography and/or hieroglyphs.	
Cuicuilco Mexico	Cuicuilco Pyramid		118	23		500 BCE to 250 CE		Unique circular pyramid, the oldest in the Valley of Mexico	
Dzibanche Mexico	Kinichna Pyramid	Maya							
Dzibanche Mexico	Temple of the Cormorants	Maya		36		400 CE to 600 CE	Kaanu'l dynasty royal burials		
Dzibanche Mexico	Temple of the Lintels	Maya							
Dzibanche Mexico	Temple of the Owl	Maya							
Edzna Mexico	Building of the Five Floors	Maya							
El Cerrito Mexico	Pyramid of El Cerrito	Chichimec		30					
El Lagartero Mexico	El Limonal Pyramid	Maya							
El Tajín Mexico	Pyramid of the Niches	Classic Veracruz		18					
Guachimontones Mexico	Circle 2 (La Iguana)	Teuchitlán		10				Characterized by the unusual circular pyramid structure, a unique architectural form in Mesoamerica.	
Huatusco Mexico	Cuauhtochco pyramid	Aztec					Teocalli		
Ichkabal Mexico	Structure E4	Maya		46					
Izamal Mexico	Chaltún Há Pyramid	Maya		8					
Izamal Mexico	Itzamatul Pyramid	Maya		26					
Izamal Mexico	Kinich Kakmó Pyramid	Maya		34		400 to 600 CE			
La Venta Mexico	The Great Pyramid	Olmec		33		394 ± 30 BCE		This is one of the earliest pyramids known in Mesoamerica. It was made out of an estimated 100,000 cubic meters of earth fill.	
Labna Mexico	El Mirador	Maya		13					
Mayapan Mexico		Maya		15					
Moral-Reforma Mexico	Conjunto 14	Maya		37					
Palenque Mexico	Temple of the Count	Maya							
Palenque Mexico	Temple of the Cross	Maya							
Palenque Mexico	Temple of the Inscriptions	Maya		22.8		>675		Bore the Classic Maya name B'olon Yej Te' Naah "House of the Nine Sharpened Spears".	
Palenque Mexico	Temple of the Sun	Maya		19					
Santa Cecilia Acatitlan Mexico		Aztec	17 by 27	8				In 1962, the architect and archaeologist Eduardo Pareyon Moreno reconstructed the pyramid's basement and the temple that crowns it.	
Tenayuca Mexico		Aztec	62 by 50					This is the earliest example yet found of the typical Aztec double pyramid, which consists of joined pyramidal bases supporting two temples.	
Tenochtitlan Mexico	Templo Mayor	Aztec	100 by 80	60		1390 to 1500 CE		Tenochtitlan was destroyed by the Spanish. Recreations of this and other pyramids are based on historical text and archaeological ruins.	
Tenochtitlan Mexico		Aztec				1325 to 1521 CE		Tenochtitlan, the Aztec capital city, was completely razed by the Spanish conquistadors led by Hernán Cortés. Recreations the city are based on historical text and archaeological ruins. This site once included at least half a dozen pyramids.	
Teotihuacan Mexico	Pyramid of the Sun	Teotihuacano	223.5	71.2	32.5	100 BCE		There are also dozens of platforms 4 stories high lining the Avenue of the Dead at Teotihuacan. Each step in each story creates a stairway to the top in front of the platforms.	
Teotihuacan Mexico	Pyramid of the Moon	Teotihuacano		43		100 BCE			
Teotihuacan Mexico	Temple of the Feathered Serpent	Teotihuacano							
El Tepozteco Mexico		Aztec				1502 CE			
Tula Mexico		Toltec							
Uxmal Mexico	Pyramid of the Magician	Maya		40					
Uxmal Mexico	La Gran Piramide	Maya		30					
Xochicalco Mexico	Temple of the Feather Serpent					200 BCE to 900 CE			
Xochicalco Mexico						200 BCE to 900 CE		This is one of several other step-pyramid temples in addition to the Temple of the Feather Serpent	
Xochitecatl Mexico	The Pyramid of Flowers		100 by 140			the Preclassic Period			
Xochitecatl Mexico	The Spiral Building					700 BCE		This is a circular stepped pyramid. The interior consists of volcanic ash. The building has no stairway to the top, it was climbed by following the spiral form of the building itself.	
Yaxchilan Mexico		Maya				600 to 900 CE		This is one of the pyramids on the upper terrace of Yaxchilan	
Yarumela Honduras	Estructure 101	Lenca		20		1000 BCE to 250 CE		Religious temple used for different ceremonies	
Tikal Guatemala	Tikal Temple IV	Maya	88 by 65	64.6		741 AD	The pyramid was built to mark the reign of the 27th king of the Tikal dynasty	Temple IV at the Classic Period Maya ruins of Tikal, 8th century AD, Peten Department, Guatemala.	
Tikal Guatemala	Tikal Temple V	Maya	51 by 36	57		700 AD		Second tallest in Tikal after Temple IV, tallest completely unearthed.	
Toniná Mexico	Great Pyramid of Toniná	Maya		75		200 to 900 CE		The Great Pyramid of Toniná is the tallest Maya and Mesoamerican pyramid and also the tallest Pre Columbian building in the Americas.	
Tzintzuntzan Mexico	5 yácata pyramids	Purépecha				Late post-classic period		The pyramids are rounded and have a distinguishable T-like shape.	
