= Tikal–Calakmul wars =

6th century conflict in Mesoamerica

Tikal–Calakmul Wars
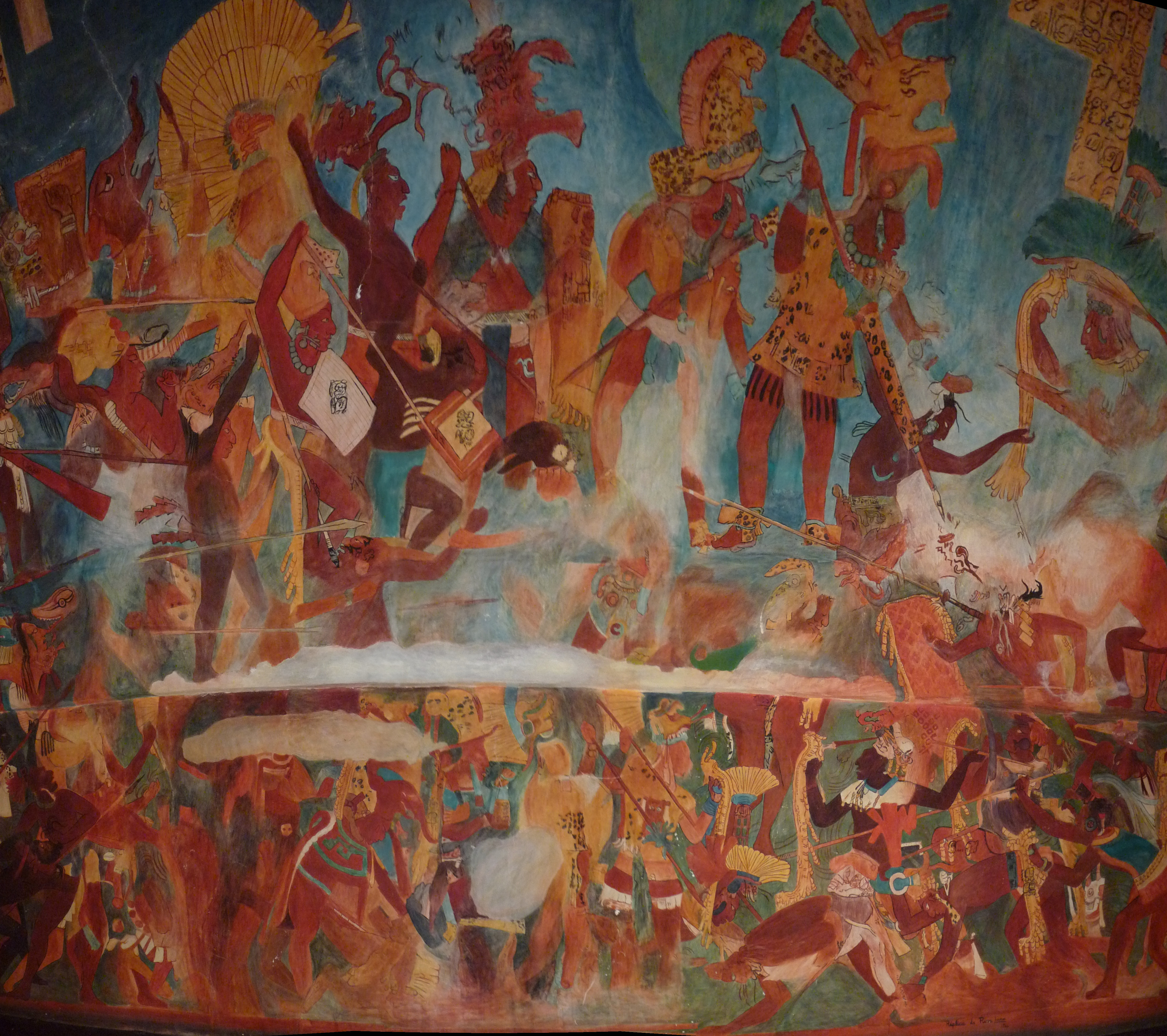
- One of the first battles in the war between Bonampak and Yaxchilan is elaborately painted at Bonampak
Date	537–838 (9.15.5.7.19 – 10.0.7.16.9 on the Maya calendar)
Location	Maya lowlands (Yucatán Peninsula, Petén Basin)
Result	Various changes in the political boundaries of the Maya region, may have contributed to the collapse of Maya civilization.

Belligerents
Mutul kingdom: Tikal Tikal-affiliated city-states: Copán; Dos Pilas (until 648); Rio Azul	Kaan kingdom Dzibanche; Calakmul Dzibanche / Calakmul-affiliated city-states: Caracol; Quiriguá; Naranjo; El Zotz; El Perú; La Corona; Dos Pilas (from 648); Uxul; Los Alacranes others	Third-party factions: Yaxchilan; El Palma

The Tikal–Calakmul wars were a series of wars that took place during the Classic period of the Maya civilization between the Kaanu'l dynasty of Dzibanche, later settled in Calakmul, against the city of Tikal for political and commercial control of the Maya Lowlands region. Other cities such as El Caracol, Dos Pilas, Naranjo, El Perú, Piedras Negras and Quiriguá were also directly involved in these wars as allies of Calakmul, as well as brief independent roles that had sites like Yaxchilan, Bonampak, and El Palma.

These were the most significant wars of the Classic period of the Maya civilization and those that defined the complex geopolitical landscape between the 6th and 8th centuries; their consequences are attributed as one of the main factors that led to the Maya collapse.

== Background ==
At the end of the 4th century, Teotihuacan conquerors arrived in the Petén Basin region. In 379, supported by allied Maya sites, the warrior Siyaj K’ak’ conquered Tikal, and under the orders of the leader Atlatl Cauac (Spearthrower Owl), a powerful Teotihuacan dynasty was established in the city, headed by his son, Yax Nuun Ahiin I. Tikal became a regional superpower financed by Teotihuacan, which gave it great military strength and political prestige, having control of its own area of influence extending its dominion by establishing an important network of vassal sites with installed rulers to take control of the region and the trade routes, which together caused a new order and a great change in the structure and political system of the Maya region.

Meanwhile, in Dzibanche, at the end of the 4th and beginning of the 5th centuries, the great political and military power of the Kaanu’l dynasty emerged, a powerful Maya lineage originating from the city that claimed a mythological and divine origin. Under the rule of Yuknoom Ch’een I, the city initiated an aggressive military expansion, subjugating and establishing tributary sites to control trade routes. In the following years, the rulers of Dzibanche, through the enthronement of subordinate rulers in other cities, the subjugation of neighboring settlements, and the establishment of military alliances with strategic sites, consolidated the city as a dominant center of power and continued to extend their influence southward until they began to clash with the power of Tikal. This marked the beginning of the historic rivalry between the Kaanu’l dynasty (who would later settle in Calakmul) and Tikal for control of the region.

In 537 the Ajaws of Bonampak, El Palma (Lakamtuun), and a vassal of the ruler K'ab' Tuun Hix of Dzibanche were captured by Yaxchilan. Bonampak and El Palma remained under the control of Yaxchilan but the capture of a captive from Dzibanche confirms that the Kaanu'l dynasty already had enough power to have a presence in a region as distant as the Usumacinta river. This gave the polity a adventagous strategic position with territory in both the east and the west of Tikal. In numerical terms, however, Calakmul remained inferior to Tikal: Despite being one of the most prosperous Maya cities, Calakmul housed just about 50,000 people, while its entire kingdom had a population of 200,000. In contrast, Tikal was home to almost half a million people. Both city states greatly eclipsed other Mayan polities, and have been described as "superpowers" that led rival power blocs.

== First war, 537–572 ==
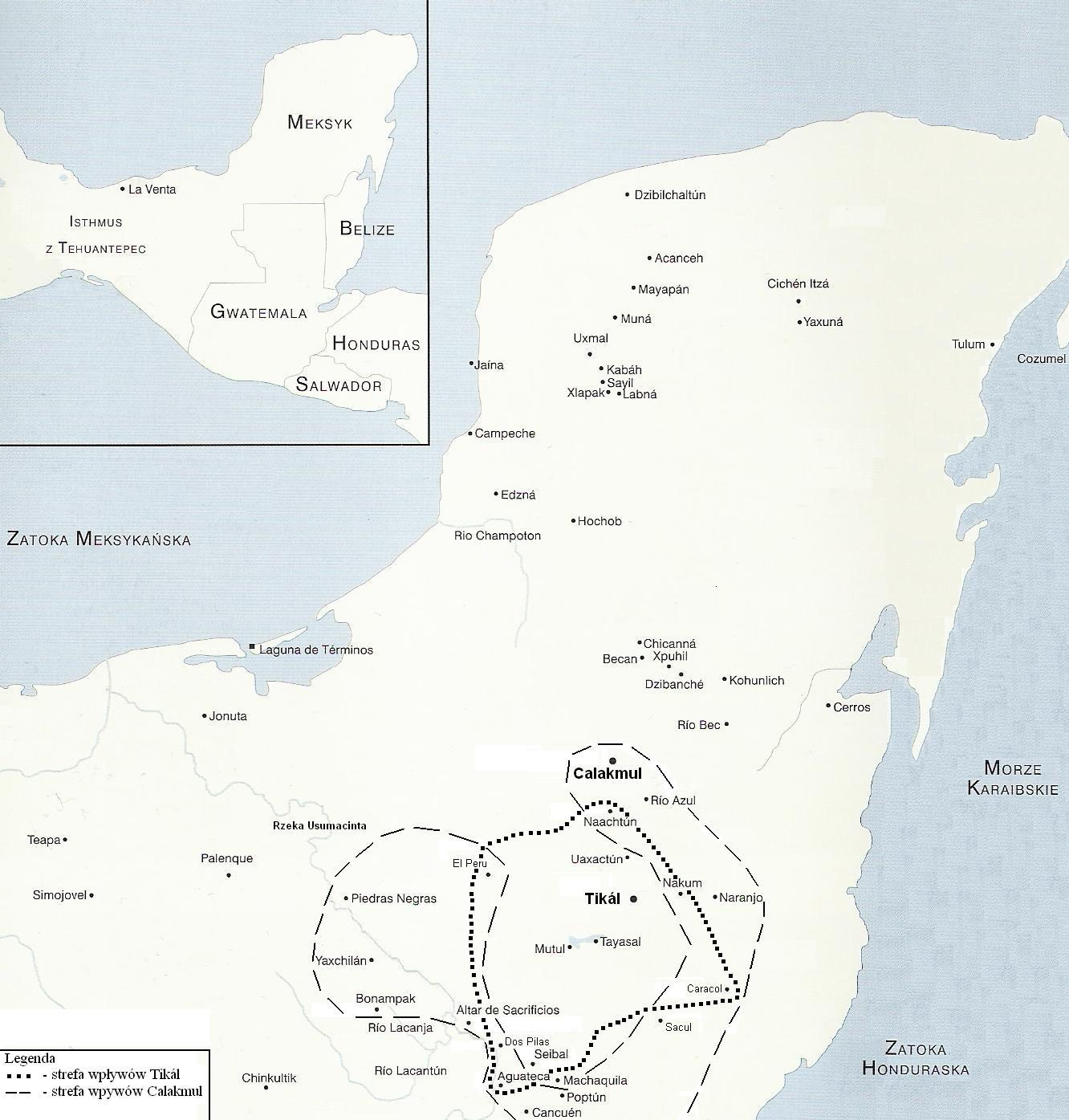
Map of Yucatán, showing the approximate boundaries of the coalitions led by Tikal and Calakmul respectively, c. 526–680

After conquering Yaxchilan and its subsidiaries, Calakmul-Dzibanche allied itself with anti-Tikal cities such as Caracol, El Perú and El Zotz. The latter in particular was located closely to Tikal, and had been opposed to its more powerful neighbor for a long time. This conflict resulted in the increasing sophistication of Maya warfare, including the construction of large, well-fortified citadels to protect strategically significant routes. One of the most notable forts, La Cuernavilla, was constructed between Tikal and El Zotz. Dzibanche went on to take control of Naranjo in 546 (9.5.11.11.18 on the Maya calendar).

In 562, the ruler K'ahk Ti' Ch'ich' of Dzibanche, in military alliance with Yajaw Te' K'inich II of Caracol, defeated Tikal in a devastating war. Tikal and its kingdom were not destroyed, but suffered major losses and went into decline after the war ended. After its defeat, Tikal lost all its regional power and fell under the military control of Dzibanche. As a result, no monuments were erected in the city for over 130 years, a period known as the Tikal Hiatus. Following this victory, Dzibanche became the most powerful Maya city in the entire region, and the Kaan kingdom consolidated its position as a hegemonic power in the Maya lowlands for the next two centuries.

== "Cold War" ==
The expression "cold war" has been used to describe the time between major conflicts involving Calakmul and Tikal. During this time, Dzibanche had a very weakened Tikal under control, which remained in a deep crisis. There was continuous war on other sites and minor border skirmishes. Military attacks by the Kaan kingdom against Palenque, the capital of the B'aakal kingdom, are also recorded in the years 599 and 611.

The most important political change occurred in the year 636 when a part of the Kaanu'l lineage split and moved to the city of Calakmul, which later became their second capital and where all their power was concentrated. Another branch of the lineage continued to rule in Dzibanche, but the main power and military and political action of the Kaan kingdom moved to Calakmul. The strategic geopolitical position of Calakmul, in a more central zone of the Maya Lowlands than Dzibanche, gave the Kaanu'l dynasty better access to trade routes and greater ease of military action.

As Tikal gradually regained strength, its local, smaller rivals such as El Zotz declined. In 629, Tikal's king K'inich Muwaan Jol II sent his son Bʼalaj Chan Kʼawiil to Dos Pilas where he established a military outpost to defend Tikal's wider zone of control. At first, Bʼalaj Chan Kʼawiil maintained loyalty to Tikal, and as time went on fighting erupted once more between Tikal and Calakmul. The latter gradually gained the upper hand, and Dos Pilas was eventually overrun by Calakmul after years of heavy combat. Bʼalaj Chan Kʼawiil initially fled into exile, but then opted to switch sides in 648.

== Second war, 648–695 ==
The second war lasted from 648 to 695 with the Kaanu'l dynasty of Dzibanché already established in Calakmul as their second capital. Now under the rule of Yuknoom Ch'een II, known as Yuknoom the Great for his feats of conquest and dominion over a huge territory of the Mayan Lowlands, the Kaan kingdom had complete political hegemony and the greatest power achieved by a Maya state in history, with major cities as allies throughout the region. One of the main battle grounds of this conflict was Dos Pilas, now a separatist kingdom led by Bʼalaj Chan Kʼawiil, under Calakmul's dominance. Supported by his new allies, Bʼalaj Chan Kʼawiil consequently began a destructive "proxy war" against his old mother city. In 672, Tikal retook Dos Pilas, but Bʼalaj Chan Kʼawiil escaped to Aguateca. He rallied his followers and allies, and launched a counter-offensive, defeating the army of Tikal in a major battle in 679.

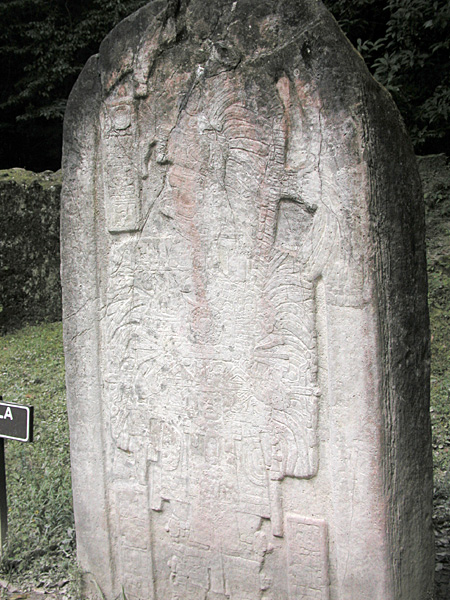
Jasaw Chan Kʼawiil I

After his victory, Bʼalaj Chan Kʼawiil captured and sacrificed Tikal's ruler (his own brother). From then until 695, three years after Bʼalajʼs death, Calakmul factually dominated Tikal. In 695, under the leadership of Jasaw Chan Kʼawiil I, Tikal won a major battle with Calakmul and turned the tables, effectively ending the Second Tikal–Calakmul War.

The rulers of Tikal, now with the power to erect monuments once again, continued to pay tribute to their Teotihuacan heritage and ancestors. In the monuments commemorating their victories, they represented themselves with symbols from Teotihuacan as sacred iconography, as a way to legitimize their power and reclaim the ancestral origin of the dynasty established by Atlatl Cauac, which years before had been profaned by Calakmul.

== Second interval ==
With Tikal having liberated itself, it once more attacked Dos Pilas and challenged Calakmul's power. In 702, Tikal suffered another defeat by Dos Pilas.

== Third war, 720–744 ==
Kʼakʼ Tiliw Chan Yopaat, Ajaw of Quiriguá was one of the key people during the third war. Quiriguá was a province of Copán, then in 734 K'ak' Tiliw Chan Yopaat led a revolution against Uaxaclajuun Ubʼaah K'awiil, Ajaw of Copán. Wamaw Kʼawiil, kaloomte (high king, a position higher than ajaw) of Calakmul traveled to Quiriguá and formed an alliance with Kʼakʼ Tiliw Chan Yopaat. Uaxaclajuun Ubʼaah Kʼawiil was executed in 738, and Quiriguá became independent. By 744 El Peru and Naranjo had been destroyed by Tikal, and Calakmul lost its most important trade network.

== Aftermath ==
The consequences of the war were catastrophic throughout the region and, along with multiple other factors, such as overpopulation, overexploitation of resources, diseases and famine, were the main problems that contributed to the Maya collapse at the end of the Classic period, which led to the abandonment of the great cities of the time. In both cities from the year 750 onwards, the deterioration that led to their abandonment can be seen; by the year 800, both cities had completely lost their power and regional influence. A monument that shows this decline in the region is Seibal stela 10, which records the visit of several lords in the year 849 from different cities, such as El Palma, including those from Calakmul and Tikal. This demonstrates that the great powers that had previously vied for dominance were now completely diminished. At the end of the Classic period, all the great Maya cities were destroyed and abandoned, and the great ruling dynasties along with their emblems disappeared. As Tikal and Calakmul fought each other, Dos Pilas experienced a period of expansion, conquering several other small cities states. However, Dos Pilas' kingdom collapsed around 761, though its dynasty survived until the early 800s in Aguateca.

Having been deprived of its military reputation Calakmul eventually lost its northern vassals like Oxpemul and collapsed. The last monument of Calakmul is Stela 61 dated to 909, which commemorates a ceremony that took place during the Maya collapse when other great cities had already been abandoned. It was created by Aj Took' the last ruler of the city possibly in an attempt to reclaim the glory of the past as the entire region was disappearing and attempting to replicate the style of the stelae created during the height of city.

Similarly despite ending Calakmul's hegemony, Tikal immediately suffered the consequences of the war and was unable to recover, as the entire region was already severely devastated. The last monument erected in the city is Stela 11, dated to 869, which is the last mention of an active government in Tikal, marking the end of its history before its abandonment.
