= Yuknoom Chʼeen I =

Maya king

Yuknoom Chʼeen I was the first known Maya ajaw (king) of the Kaan kingdom. He was maybe a father of King Tuun Kʼabʼ Hix.

== Identity ==
Although nineteen Kaan kings are listed on the Dynastic Vases, some with the names of known historical rulers, clear discrepancies in their accession dates make it uncertain whether the nineteen names are to be considered historical or legendary. Thus Yuknoom Chʼeen can be said to be the first known, clearly historical ruler of Kaan.

That kingdom's location in Yuknoom Chʼeen's time — roughly the years around AD 500 — is not certain; although Calakmul is known to have been the capital in the Late Classic, there is a reason to doubt that this was the case earlier. Dzibanche emerges as a strong possibility for the previous center because Yuknoom Chʼeen is repeatedly named there on a sculptured "captive stairway". Although this monument's interpretation hinges on a single problematic glyph, it is likely that Yuknoom Chʼeen was a ruler of Dzibanche and the captives were his trophies.
