= Temple of the Owl =

Coordinates: 18.6384°N 88.7587°W

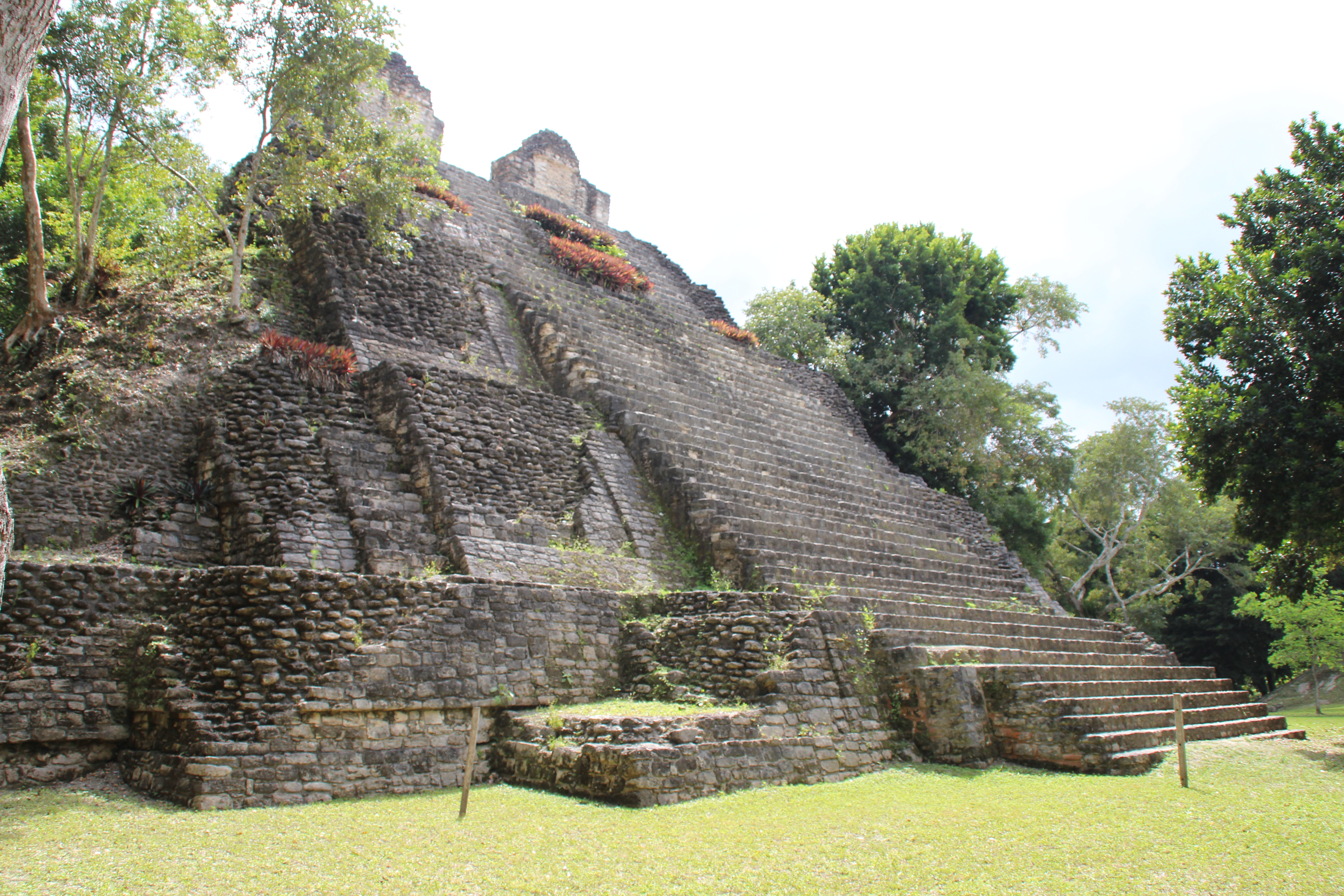
- Interactive map of Temple of the Owl
- Location: Dzibanche, Mexico

History
- Built: 5th - 6th century
- Built for: Kaan dynasty

The Temple of the Owl is a Maya temple located in the ancient city of Dzibanche in Quintana Roo, Mexico, the first capital of the Kaan kingdom. The Temple of the Owl was built in the classic period of the Maya civilization around the 5th to 6th century as a funerary structure. Inside its pyramidal base is a three-level staircase leading to a burial chamber where the tomb of a royal woman of the Kaanu'l dynasty was found, which included a rich and extensive funerary trousseau of vessels, ceramics, bowls, obsidian blades and a large white shell (spondylus) inlaid with jade and carved with the image of a ruler. It receives the name of Temple of the Owl in reference to a polychrome ceramic vessel found inside the tomb of the temple decorated with a lid in the shape of the head of an owl, a bird that in the ancient Maya mythology was related to the night with the ability to travel between the world of life and death and that could guide the souls through their journey in the underworld. Archaeologically it is also known as the Temple I, Building 1 or E1 of Dzibanche.

== Architecture ==
The Temple of the Owl is located in the Xibalbá plaza of the main complex of Dzibanche behind the Temple of the Cormorants, the structure is composed of a large stepped pyramidal base of three levels with a temple with roof comb at the top. The interior of the base contains a staircase that gives access to a main chamber and a royal tomb. The roof of the temple located at the top of the pyramidal base is collapsed, although it still preserves part of its front and side walls. Including its roof comb, the structure could originally have exceeded a height of more than 30 meters.

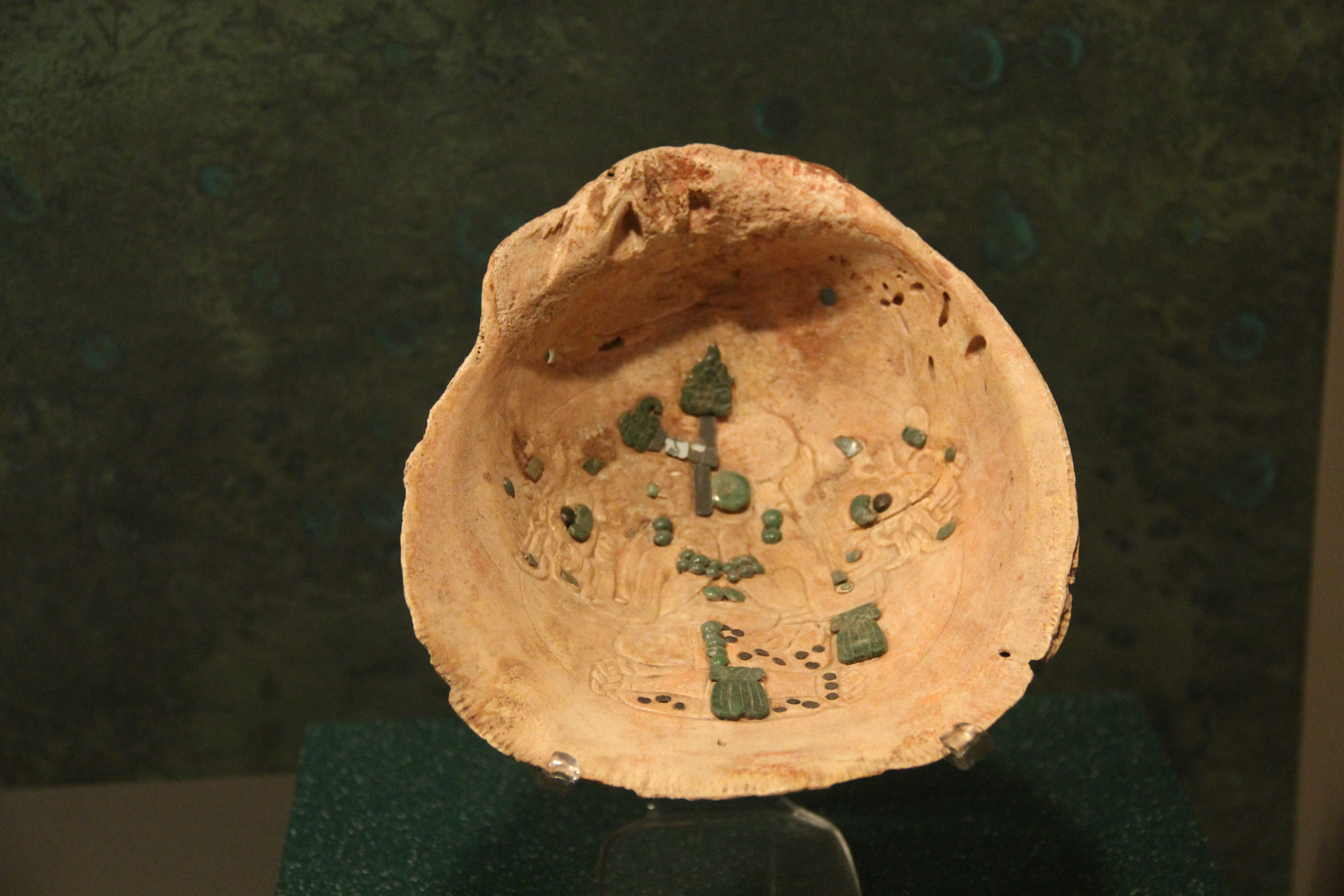
White shell inlaid with jade found in the tomb of the Temple of the Owl

=== Tomb of the Temple of the Owl ===
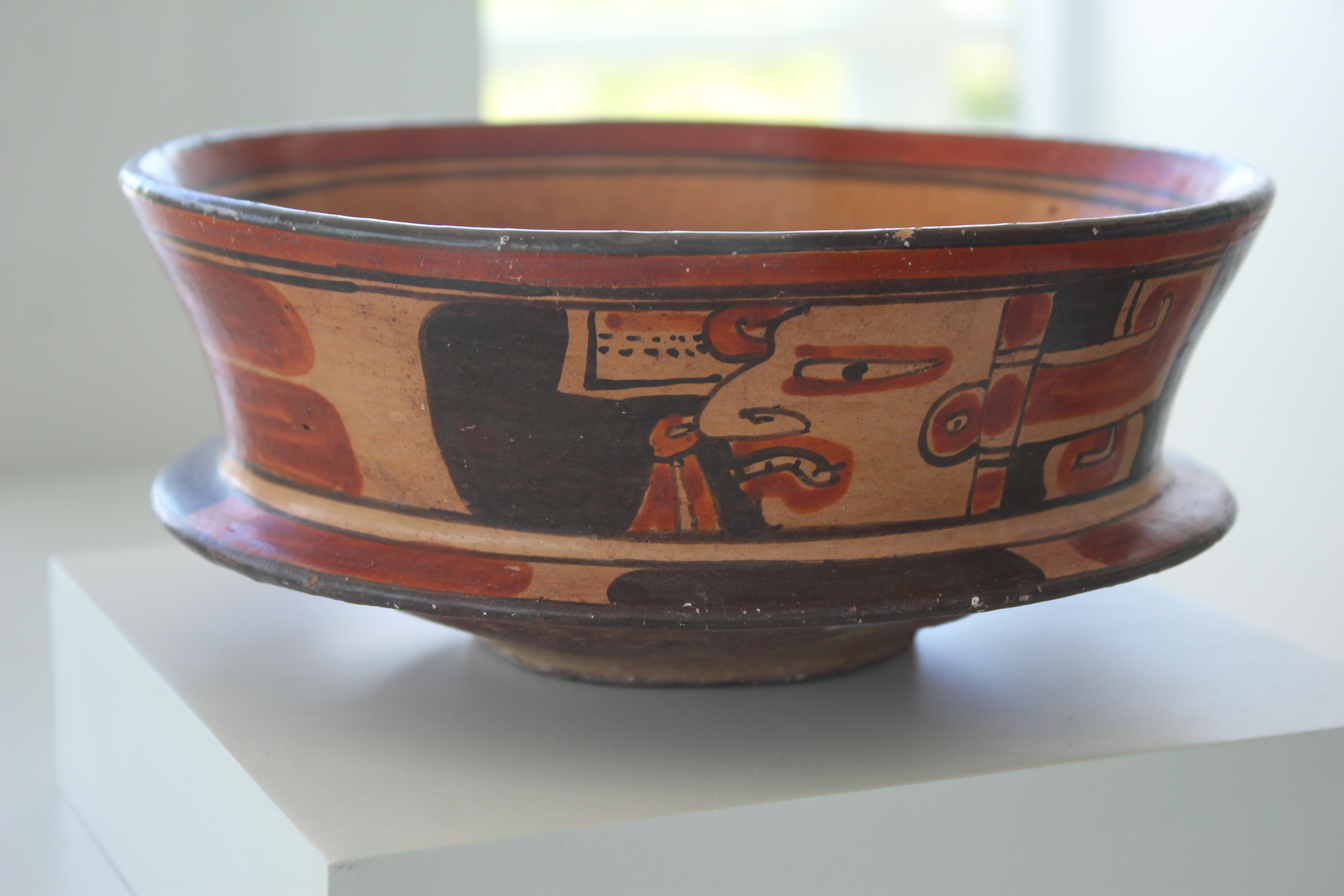
Ceramic vessel from the funerary trousseau of the tomb of the Temple of the Owl

The top of the pyramidal base of the Temple of the Owl has an entrance to a staircase that leads to a funerary chamber similar to the Temple of the Inscriptions at Palenque where a royal tomb of the Kaanu'l dynasty of Dzibanche was found, dated to around 400 AD. Inside the burial was the skeleton of an adult woman sitting cross-legged, reclining on a plate and surrounded by a large mortuary offering of high-quality ceramics such as several polychrome vessels with lids, one of them with a lid in the shape of an owl's head that was used as a reference by archaeologists to name the structure, a bowl with representations of monkeys and a stone bowl in addition to 14 obsidian blades and a large white Spondylus shell, unique in its kind in the Maya region, engraved in detail with the image of a ruler and finely decorated with inlays of jade and black coral.
