= Temple of the Cormorants =

Coordinates: 18°38′19″N 88°45′34″W

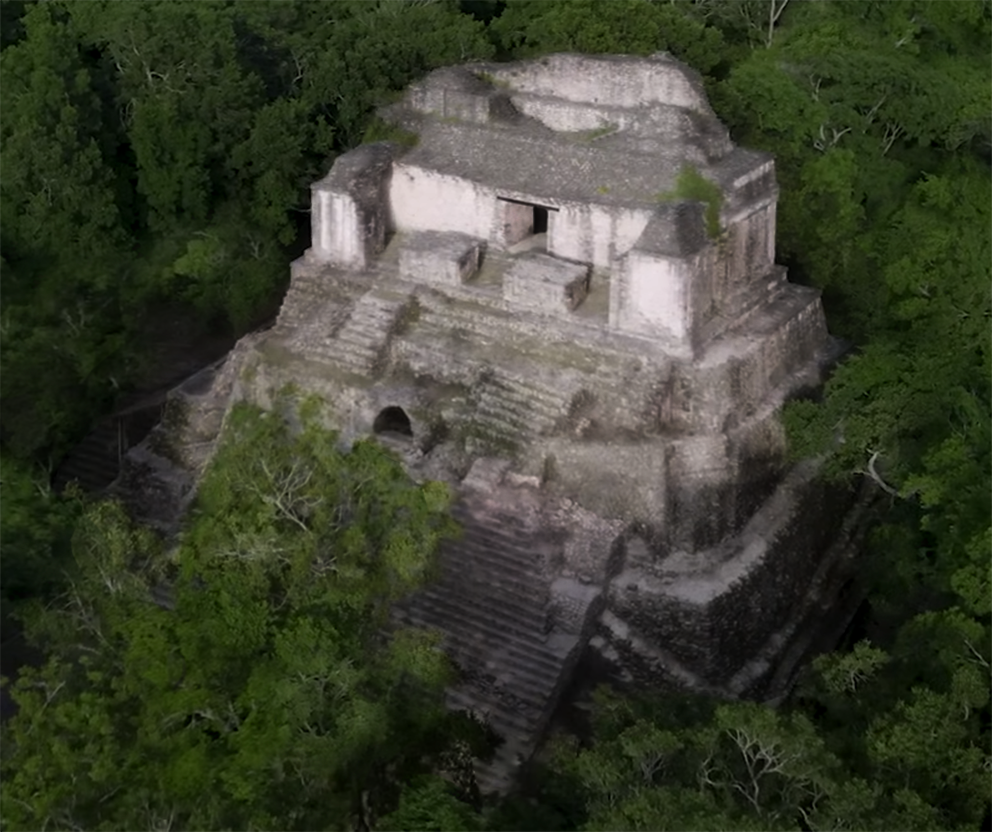
- Interactive map of Temple of the Cormorants
- Type: Maya temple
- Location: Dzibanche, Mexico
- Height: 34 metres (112 ft)
- Built: 6th century
- Built for: Kaan dynasty
- Architectural style: Paired pilasters

The Temple of the Cormorants is a ceremonial Maya temple located in the ancient city of Dzibanche in southern Quintana Roo, Mexico. It was named the Temple of the Cormorants after a ceramic vessel found inside, painted with images of the cormorant, a hunting bird related to the underworld in Maya mythology. Archaeologically it is also known as Temple II or E2 of Dzibanche.

The temple is part of the Xibalbá plaza in the core of the Maya city of Dzibanche, the first capital of the Kaan kingdom. The pyramidal base is formed by a system of funerary chambers with royal tombs of members of the Kaanu'l dynasty, the main burial is the tomb of the ruler Ut Chan, also known as Sky Witness, who was the ruler of Dzibanche between the years 561 and 572 AD. The burials included large funerary trousseau with polychrome ceramic vessels, obsidian, necklaces, bracelets and jade masks.

== Architecture ==
The Temple of the Cormorants is located in Xibalbá Plaza in front of the Temple of the Owl in the core of Dzibanche, it is 34 meters high and its the tallest building in the central architectural group. The building consists of a large, stepped pyramidal base with entrances to the burial chambers and a temple on the top with a roof comb. The architecture of the structure follows the local architectural style characteristic of Dzibanche developed by the Kaanu'l dynasty called paired pilasters, which consists of facades with decorated pillars. This architectural style has also been identified in Calakmul, the later capital of the Kaan kingdom.

=== Burial chambers ===
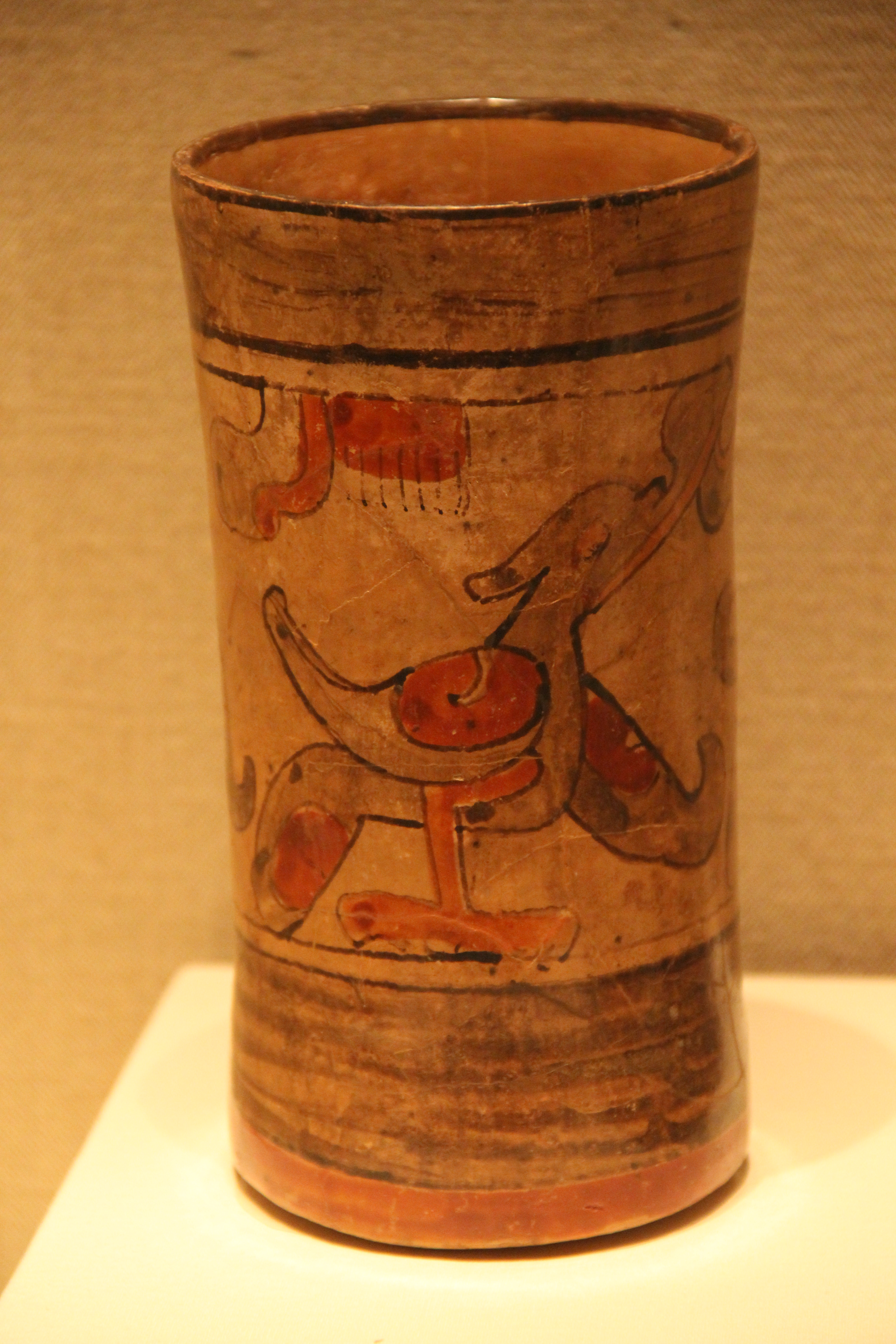
Polychrome vase painted with cormorants found inside a burial from the temple.

The Temple of the Cormorants was a royal burial site for the Kaanu'l dynasty. Around 7 tombs have been found inside the temple, the burials share common features of the Kaanu'l lineage's funerary tradition, such as the placement of certain elements in their rich funerary trousseau like jade masks.

==== Tomb of the Lord of Dzibanche (Sky Witness) ====
The main burial chamber within the stepped pyramid base contains the tomb of the Kaan dynasty ruler Ut Chan or Sky Witness, ruler of Dzibanché, who defeated Tikal in 562 AD. The tomb contained the skeleton laid on a jaguar pelt with a large funerary trousseau consisting of polychrome ceramic vessels, obsidian blades, necklaces and bracelets made of jade and shell, a jade pectoral and three jade masks. Due to the richness of the offerings, the tomb has been called the Tomb of the Lord of Dzibanche. Analysis of the skeleton has determined that it corresponds to a man approximately 30 to 35 years old, 1.62 meters tall, and with artificial cranial deformation. Next to the skeleton was found a bone awl used for rituals of self-sacrifice and bloodletting, which has a hieroglyphic inscription engraved on it interpreted as: "It is the offering bone of Yuhknom Ut Chan, holy lord of Kaanu'l." The offering bones or bone awls were used by their bearers to offer blood or perform ritual bleeding to the gods, getting access to the divine world or purifying themselves. According to Maya mythology, each bone awl was directly linked to its owner as a sacred receptacle of their vital energy.

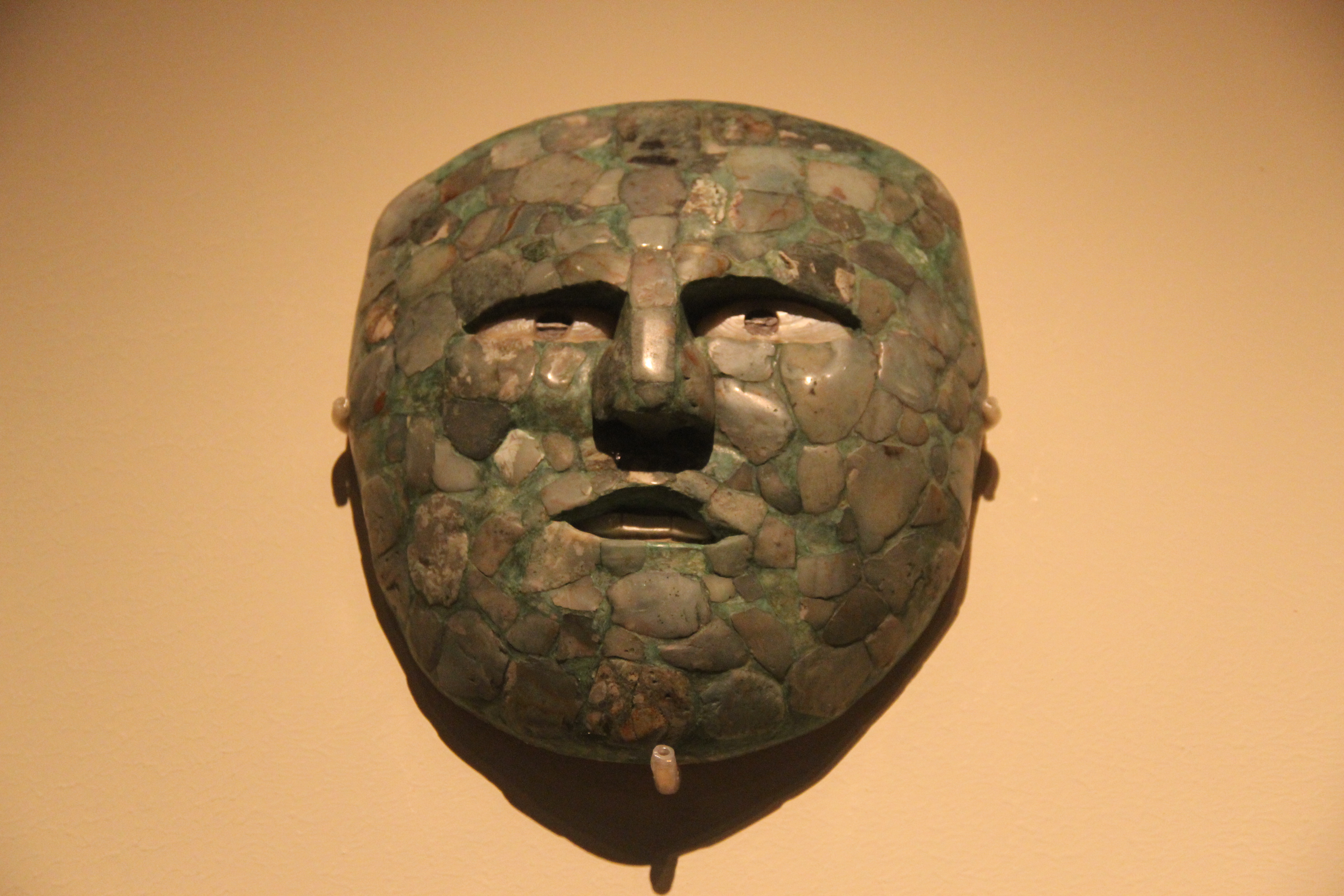
Jade mask from a cist burial in the temple floor

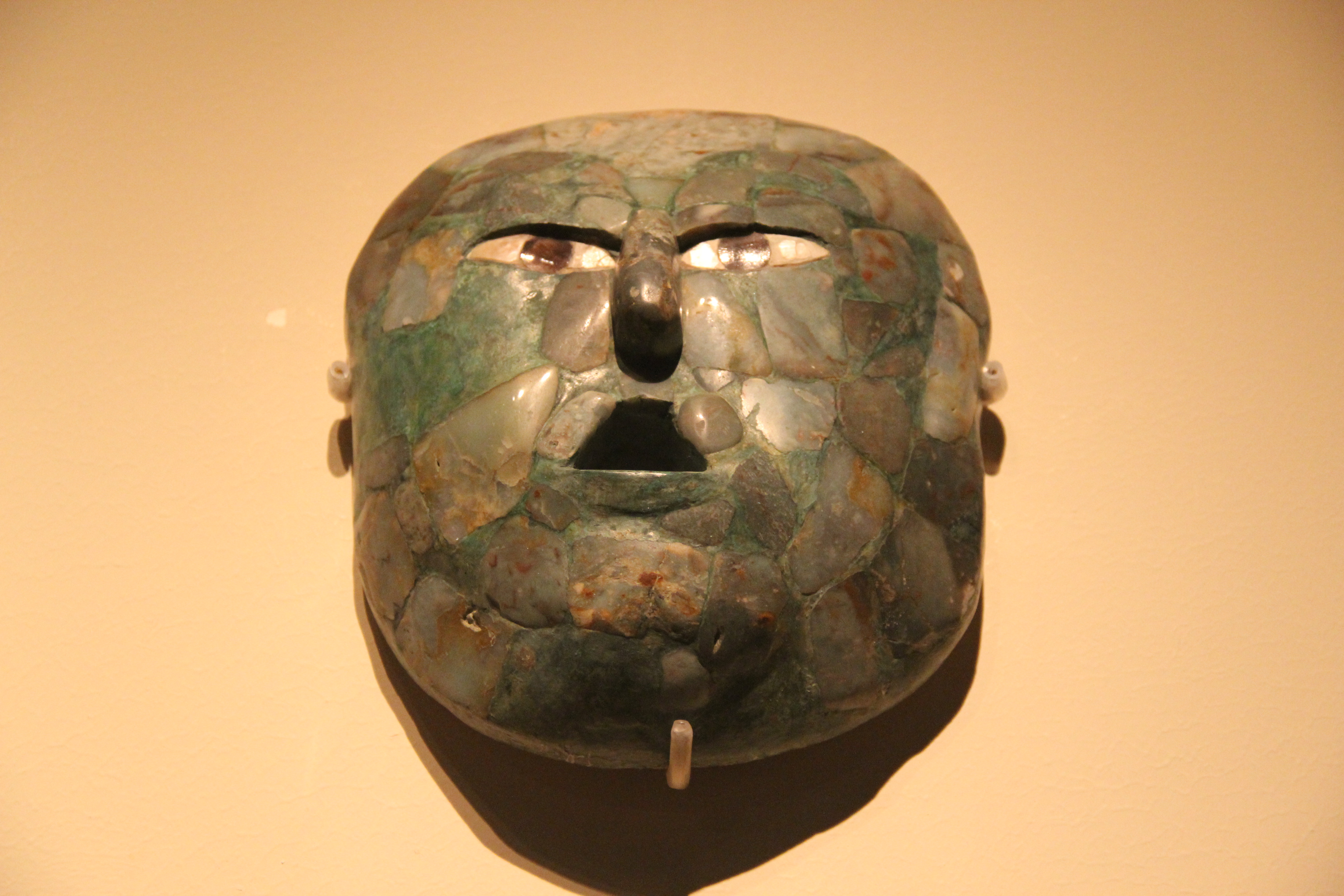
Jade mask found on the burial chamber 2 of the Temple of the Cormorants

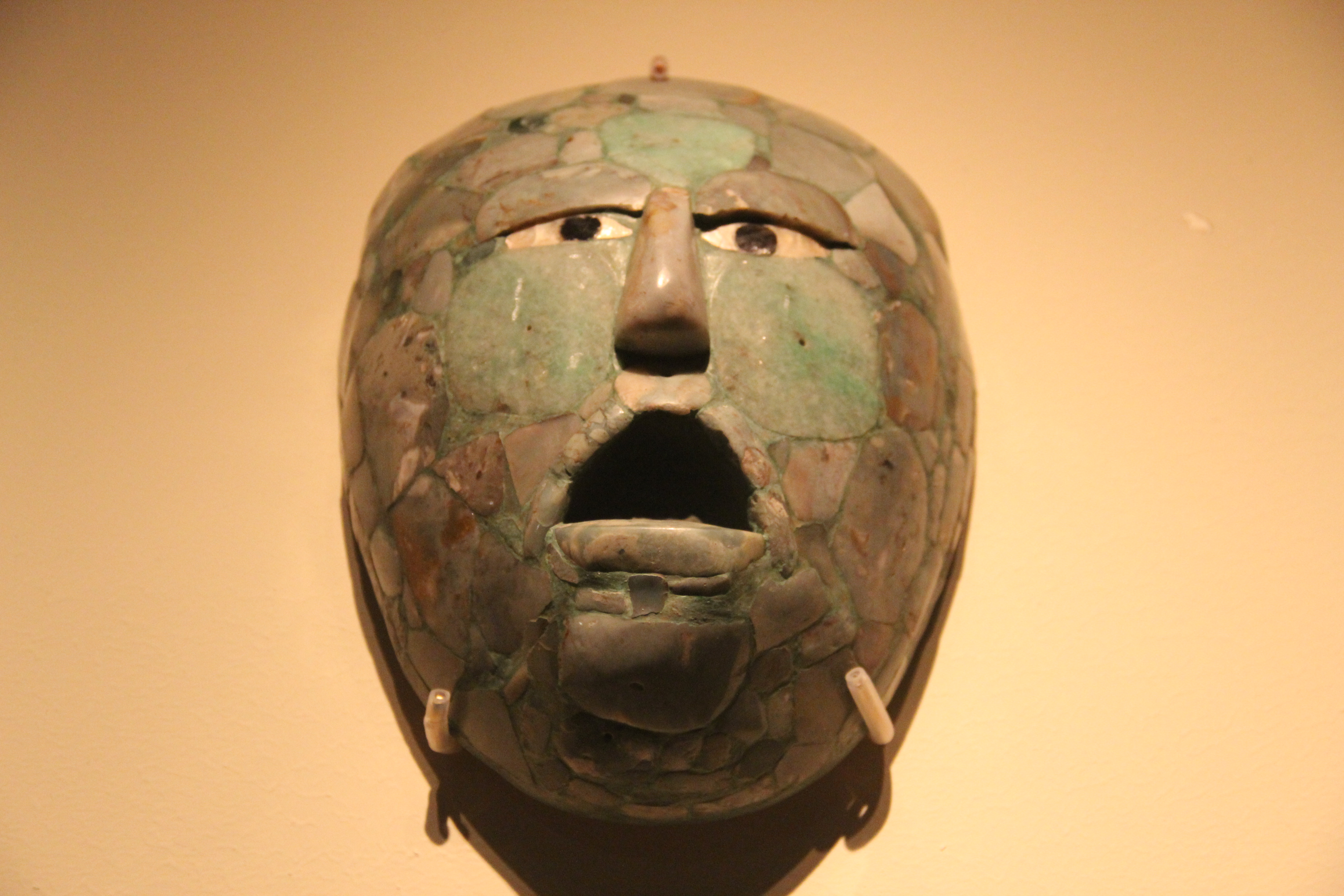
Jade mask found on the burial chamber 4 of the Temple of the Cormorants
