= Ichkabal =

Ancient Mayan city in Quintana Roo, Mexico

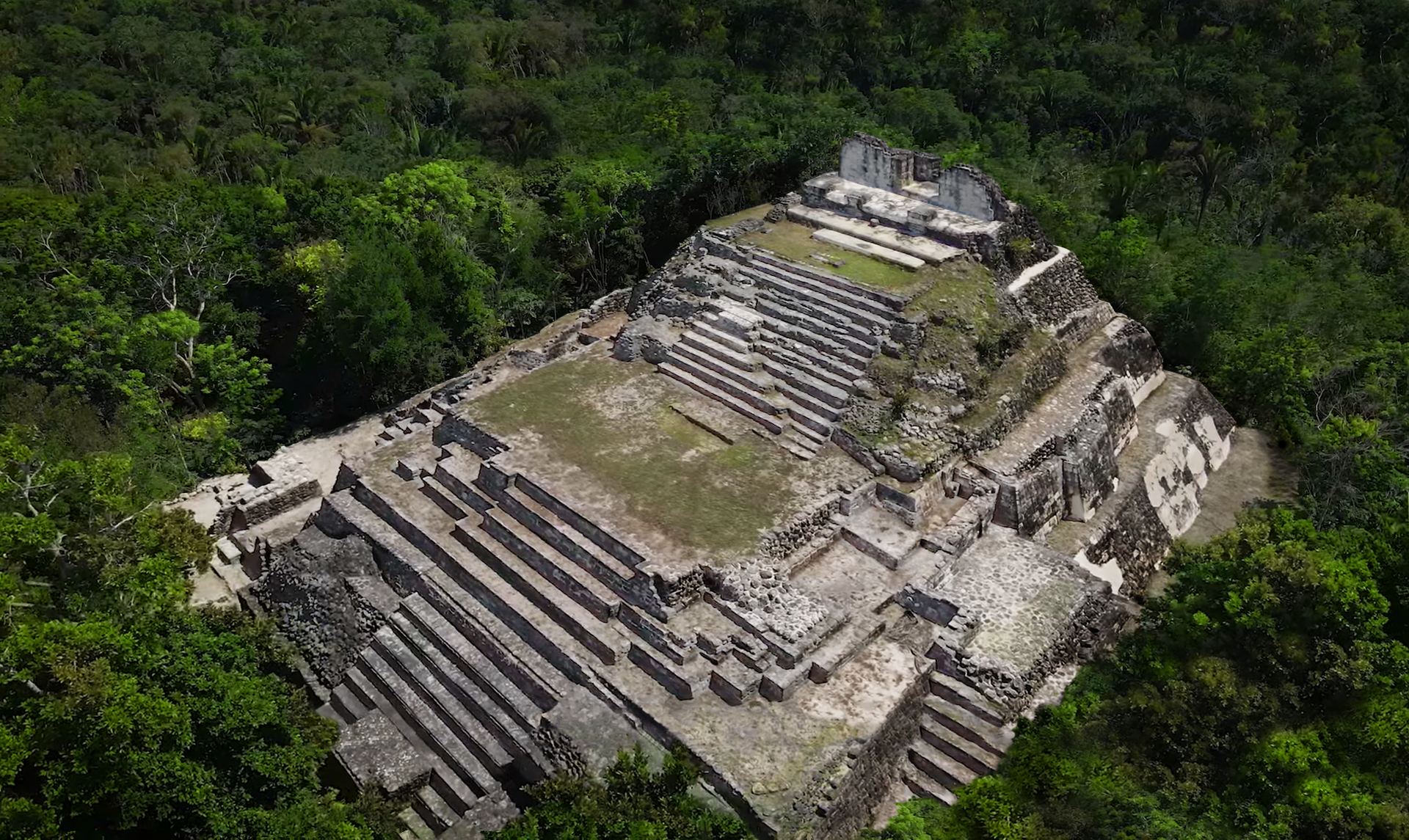
- Ichkabal pyramid

- Location within Mexico Location within Quintana Roo
- Type: Ancient Maya city
- Periods: Preclassic - Classic - Postclassic
- Cultures: Maya civilization
- Location: Mexico
- Region: Quintana Roo

History
- Built: 400 BC
- Abandoned: c. 1500 AD

Site notes
- Area: 60 km
- Discovered: 1995

Ichkabal is a large ancient Maya city located in the jungle of Quintana Roo in Mexico dating from the Middle Preclassic period of the Maya civilization around 400 BC, it developed as a monumental city until the Postclassic period.

== Location ==
Ichkabal is located near Lake Bacalar inside the tropical jungle of Quintana Roo in Mexico and near other Maya sites like Dzibanche, Kohunlich, Pol Box, Dzibantunich among others.

== Archaeology ==
Ichkabal is an extensive site conformed by six main architectural groups covering about 60 km with monumental buildings and pyramids over 40 to 46 meters tall that are visible above the jungle canopy. The main plaza, which has an extension of 300 meters, is considered one of the biggest sites from the Maya Lowlands. The site was connected to the city of Dzibanche by a large sacbe of over 40 km long.

== History ==
Ichakbal settlement started in the Middle Preclassic period of Mesoamerica, around the year 400 BC. During the Classic period, Ichkabal was related with the Kaan dynasty of Dzibanche, a major power of the Maya region. According to archaeological research the site was populated until the late Postclassic period around the year 1500, few years before the beginning of the Spanish conquest of Mexico.

Ichkabal remained hidden deep in the jungle of Quintana Roo until it was discovered by archaeologists in 1995.
