= Los Alacranes =

- B'uuk'
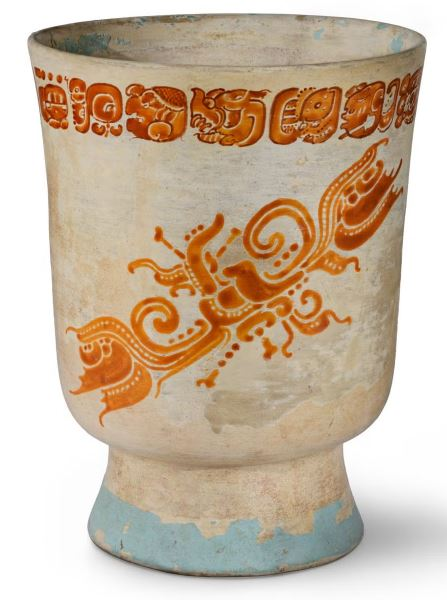
- Ceramic vessel from Los Alacranes that belonged to the ruler Tut K'in Chaak
- Interactive map of Los Alacranes
- Type: Ancient Maya site
- Periods: Preclassic - Late Classic
- Cultures: Maya civilization
- Location: Mexico
- Region: Campeche

History
- Built: 400 BC - 900 AD
- Abandoned: 900 AD

Site notes
- Discovered: 1996

Los Alacranes, originally named B'uuk', is a large Maya archaeological site located in southern Campeche, Mexico. The site was a Maya city with a settlement dating back to the Late Preclassic period and was continuously occupied until the Late Classic period, when it reached its peak of development as an important ceremonial and political center in the region. During its occupation, the rulers of Los Alacranes had a close relation with the rulers of the Kaan kingdom and its capital Dzibanche, the greatest regional Maya power of the Classic period. Among the most important archaeological discoveries from Los Alacranes are two large late Classic stelae carved with images of some of the city's rulers and extensive hieroglyphic inscriptions, which are permanently displayed outside a church in a small town of the same name near the archaeological site.

== Location ==
Los Alacranes is located between two natural elevations over a small town of the same name in the Calakmul municipality of the Mexican state of Campeche, near the state border with Quintana Roo. The majority of its structures are buried under dense jungle.

== History ==
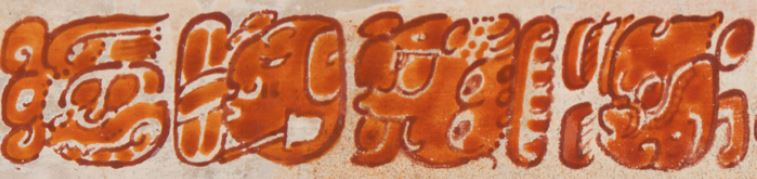
Hieroglyphic inscription on a ceramic vessel from Los Alacranes

Ceramic and archaeological findings have identified that its pre-Columbian settlement dates back to the late Preclassic period (400 BC – 200 AD) although it had its peak of development during the late Classic, in which Los Alacranes was a city with regional influence and maintained a strong political relevance having a diplomatic relation with the Kaan dynasty of Dzibanche, later stablished in Calakmul, when they were at the height of their power, which brought great prosperity to Los Alacranes. The original name of Los Alacranes, recorded through its emblem glyph, was B'uuk'. One notable fact is that the rulers of Los Alacranes did not use the term K'uhul Ajaw, "sacred lord", the greatest symbol of power of the classic Maya rulers, but rather they only used the title of Ajaw, possibly indicating that they lacked greater power with respect to other sites, as they were vassals of the Kaanu'l dynasty, but had some political autonomy. In the terminal late classic period, there is evidence that Los Alacranes had relations and conflicts with other sites located to the south in the Petén basin region. Other major archaeological discoveries are several polychrome ceramics with a style unique to the region, which has suggested that finely painted vases and vessels were made at Los Alacranes.

Stela 1 from Los Alacranes contains a long hieroglyphic inscription recording a brief biography of a local ruler named Sak B’aah Witzil under the title of B’uuk' Ajaw (Lord of B’uuk') and his enthronement under the supervision of Sky Witness the ruler of Dzibanche. The stela records that the ruler Sak B’aah Witzil was born on the Maya calendar date of 11 Chuwen 19 Sak, which according to archaeological studies corresponds to November 8, 504 AD. The inscription then records his accession to power on the Long Count date of 9.6.7.3.18 7 Ets’nab 1 Sip, corresponding to April 30, 561 AD, in a ceremony overseen by Sky Witness, a major ruler of the Kaanu'l dynasty from Dzibanche, the greatest regional power of the Maya civilization at the time. The stela continues to narrate details of the ruler's lineage and a possible scribal signature has also been identified. The stela narrates the main theme as: “On the 11 Chuwen 19 Sak, was born Sak B’aah Wiztil, Lord of B’uuk’. 7 days, 17 Haab, and 2 K’atun after his birth, he tied himself to the kingdom, on 7 Ets'nab 1 Sip under the command of Sky Witness, the sacred lord of Kaan".

A foreign mention of Los Alacranes appears on a severely damaged stela from a site known as Xultún in which the emblem glyph of Los Alacranes is mentioned as the place of origin of a captive, however, the inscription containing the date is badly eroded and the rest is illegible, so further information could not be deciphered. In a historical context, Xultún was a vassal site of Tikal, the main enemy of Calakmul, while Los Alacranes was a close ally of the Kaanu'l dynasty and consequently an enemy of its rivals.

== Rulers of Los Alacranes ==
- Sak B’aah Witzil
- Tut K’in Chaak
