= Tuun Kʼabʼ Hix =

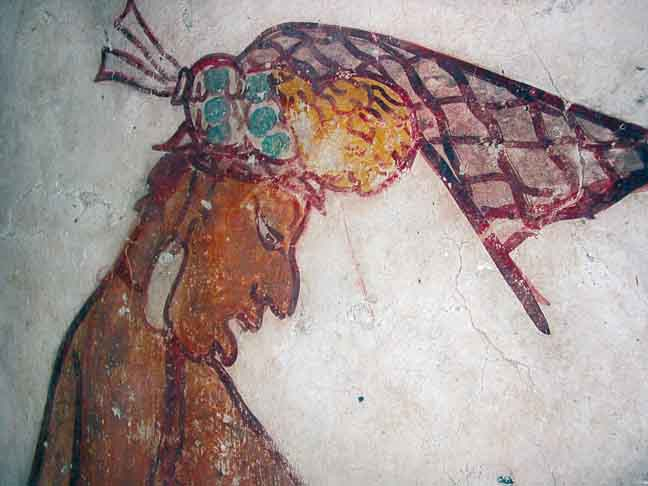
- Detail of a wall painting in Calakmul, probably depicting a king
- Title: King of Kaan
- Spouse: Ix Ekʼ Naah
- Children: Daughter

Tuun Kʼabʼ Hix (Cu Ix, Ku Ix, Kʼaltuun Hix; "Bound-Stone Jaguar") was a Maya king of the Kaan Kingdom.

== Reign ==
Tuun Kʼab Hix reigned from the year 520 to 546. He is known only from foreign references.

A lintel at Yaxchilan describing the military successes of Kʼinich Tatbu Skull II records a captive from Kaan in AD 537 (the captive vassal of the Kaan ruler may have been a woman).

Stela 25 from Naranjo records the accession of Aj Wosal Chan Kʼinich in 546 under the auspices of Tuun Kʼabʼ Hix.

The Kaan Kingdom was asserting its influence in the southern Maya lowlands and inaugurating the struggle for supremacy with its great rival Tikal.

It was probably during the reign of Tuun Kʼabʼ Hix that a ruler of El Resbalón declared himself to be a vassal of Kaan in 529, as the one clear date on the El Resbalón hieroglyphic stairway is 529.

== Family ==
Wife of Tuun Kʼabʼ Hix was Queen Ix Ekʼ Naah ("Lady Star House").

In 520 their daughter traveled to La Corona to marry a lord of that site.

Mother-in-law of Tuun Kʼabʼ Hix was Lady Bʼakabʼ.
