= Dzibanche =

Maya city of the Early Classic period and first capital of the Kaan kingdom

Coordinates: 18°38′19″N 88°45′33″W

- Kaanu'l

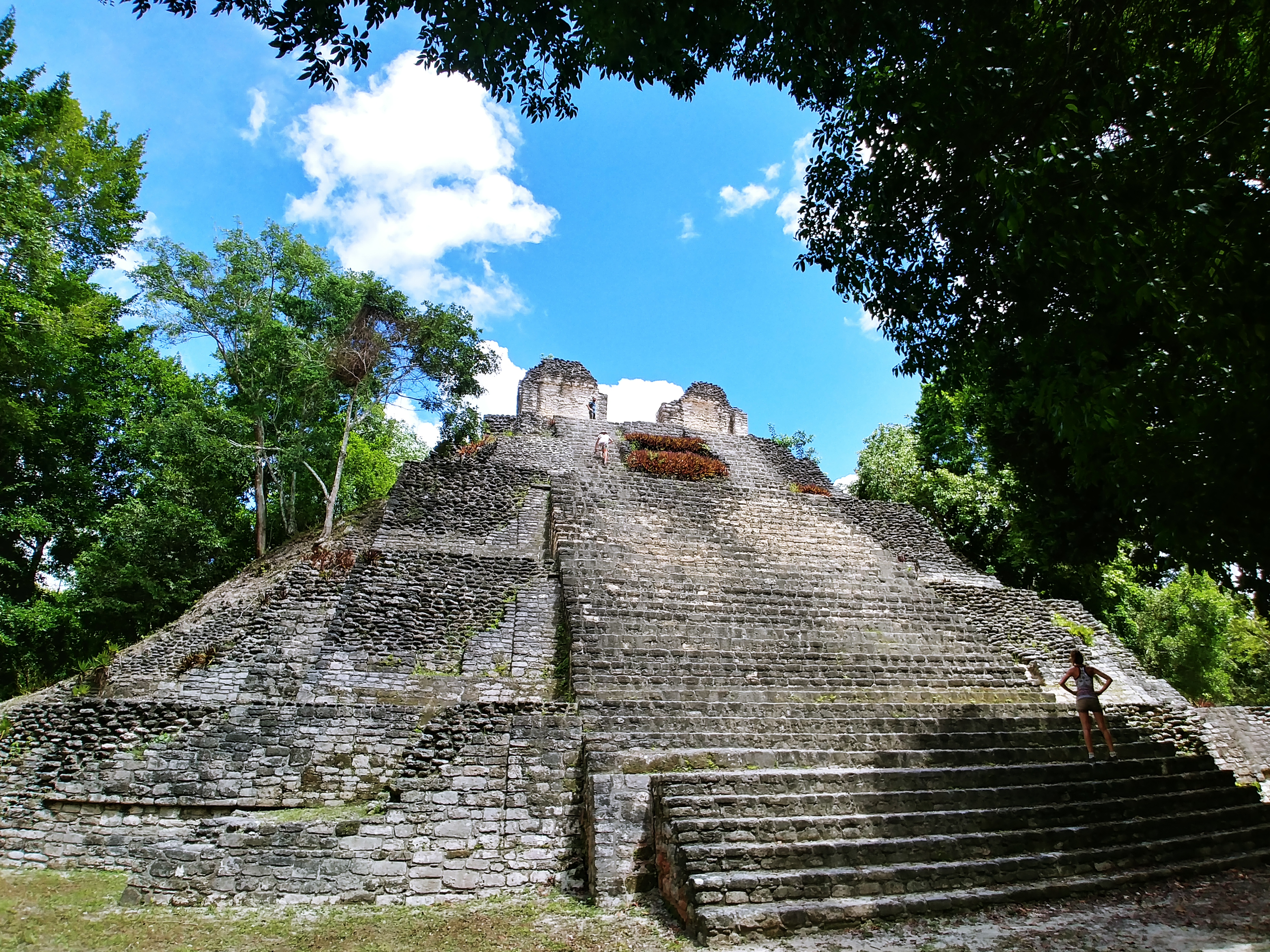
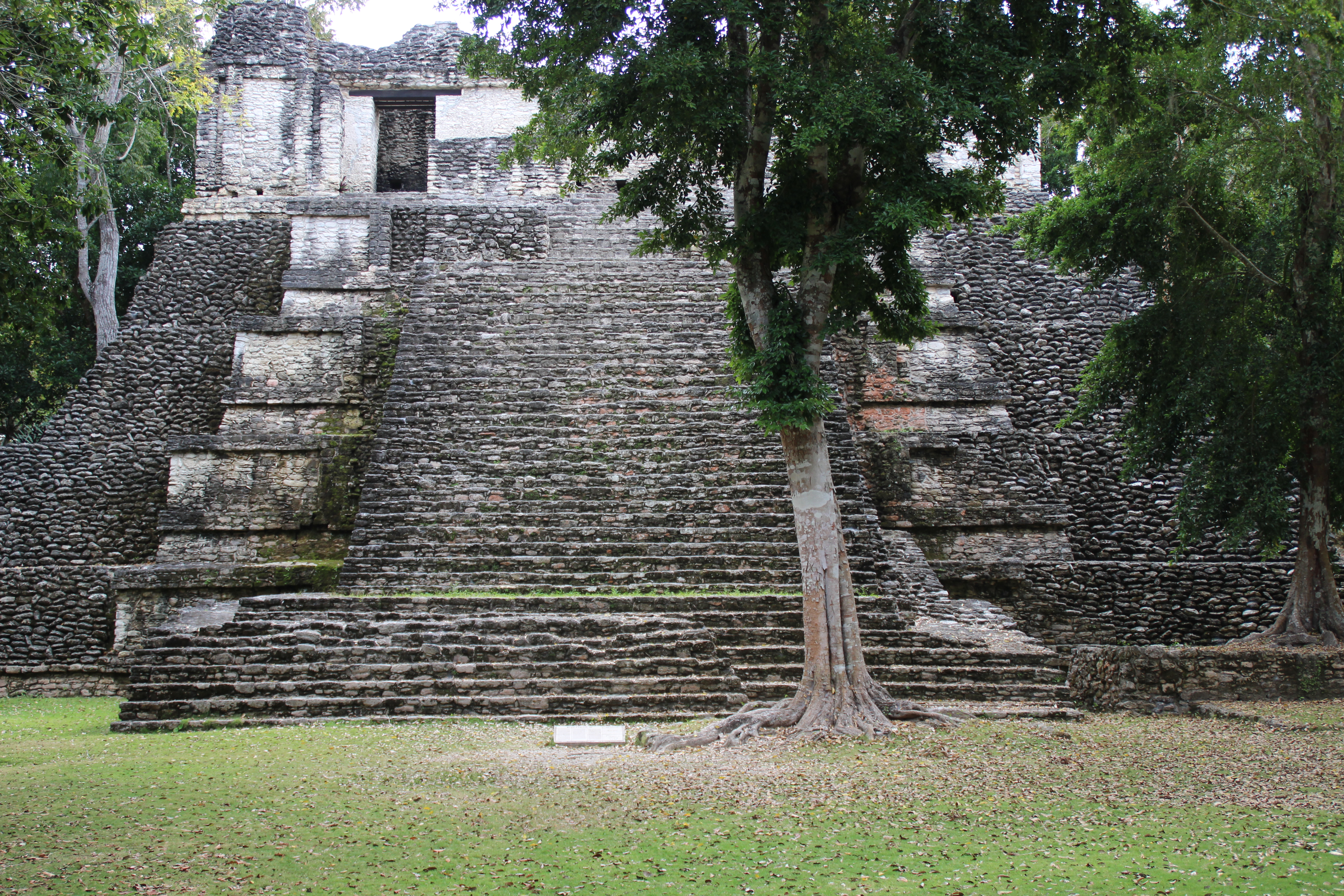
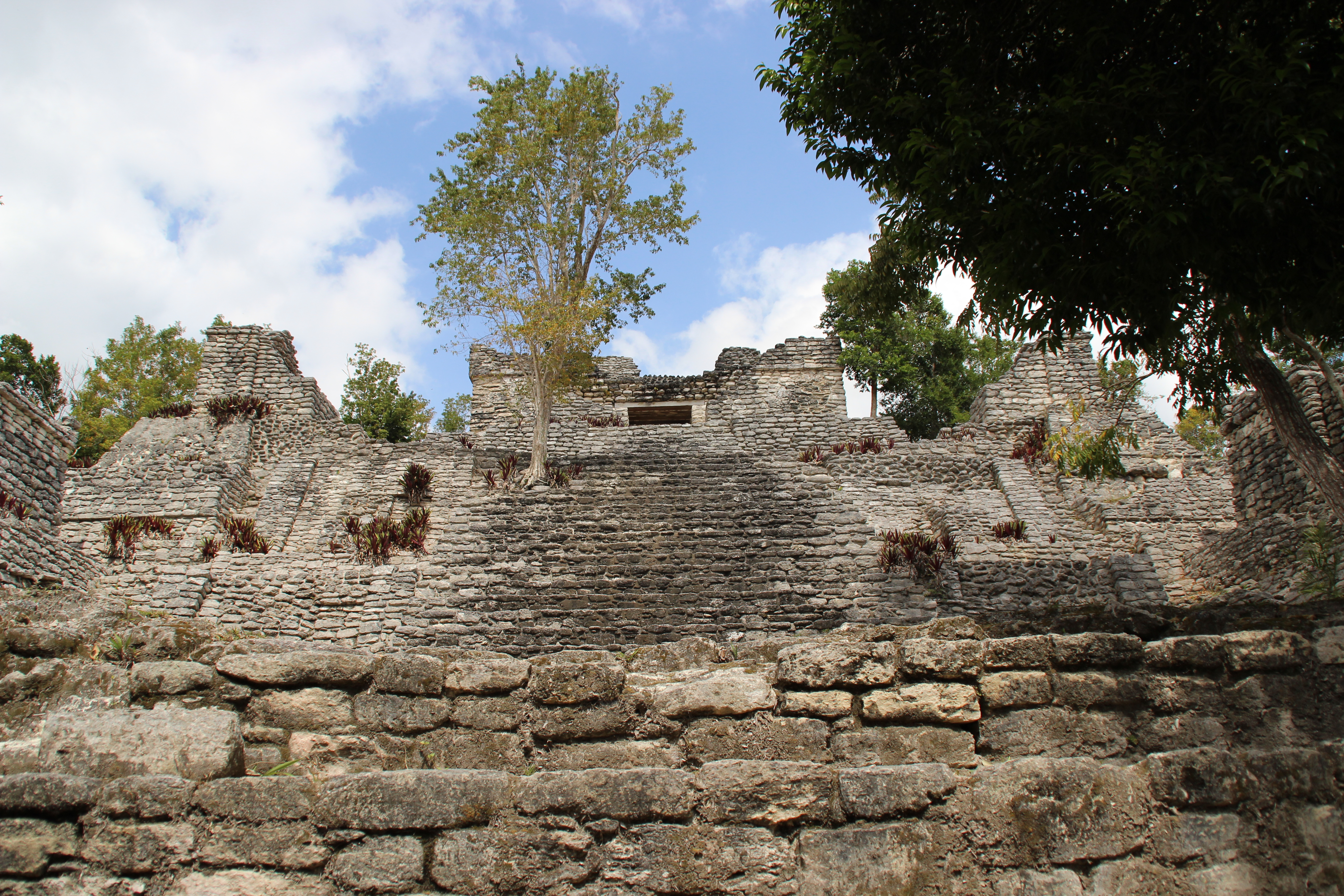
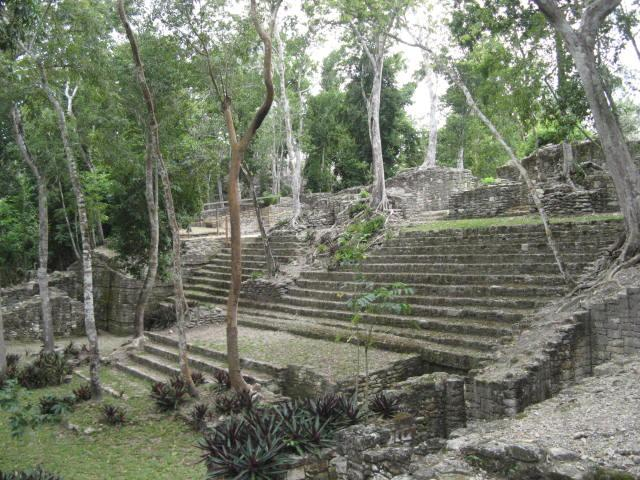
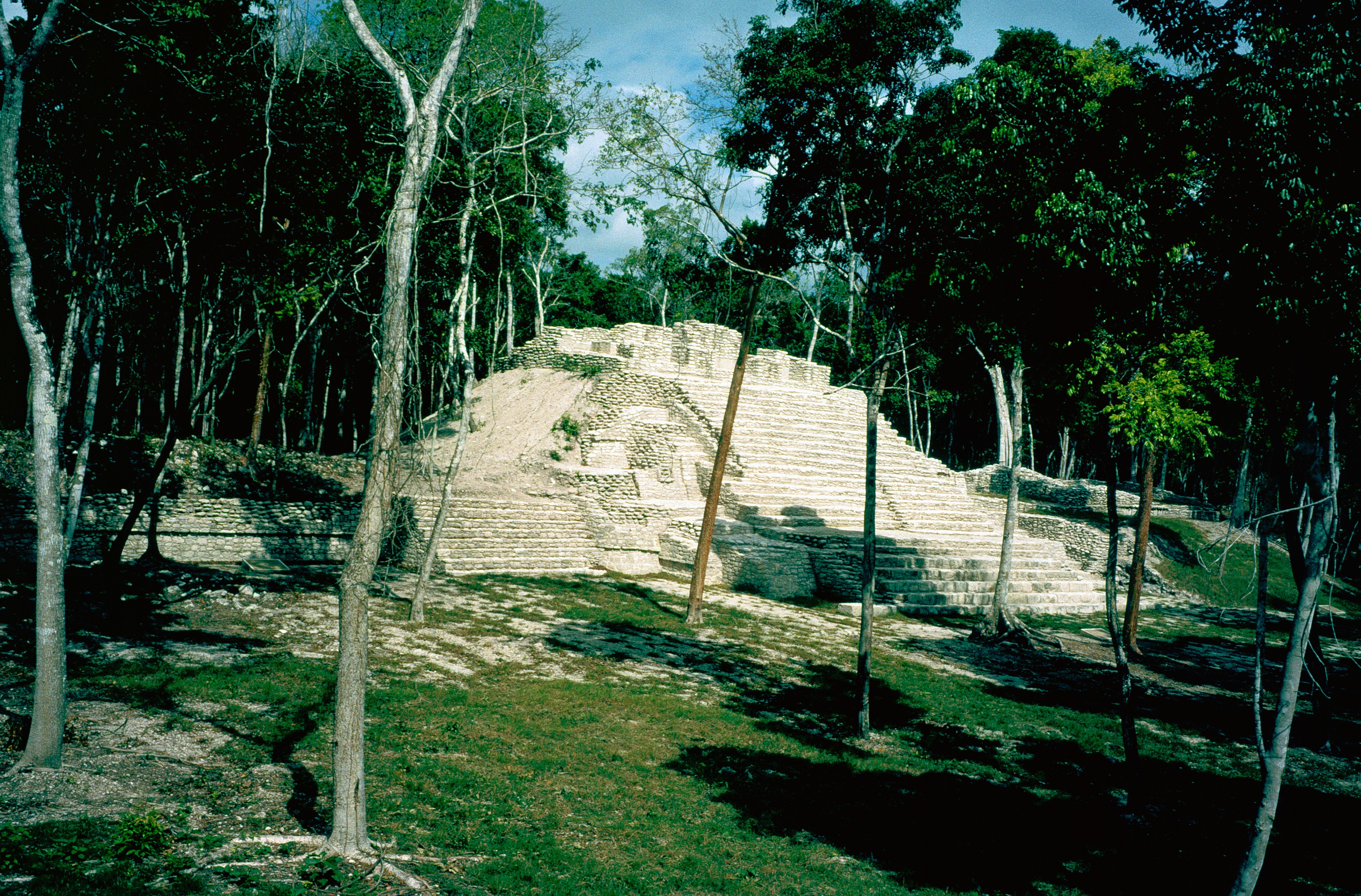
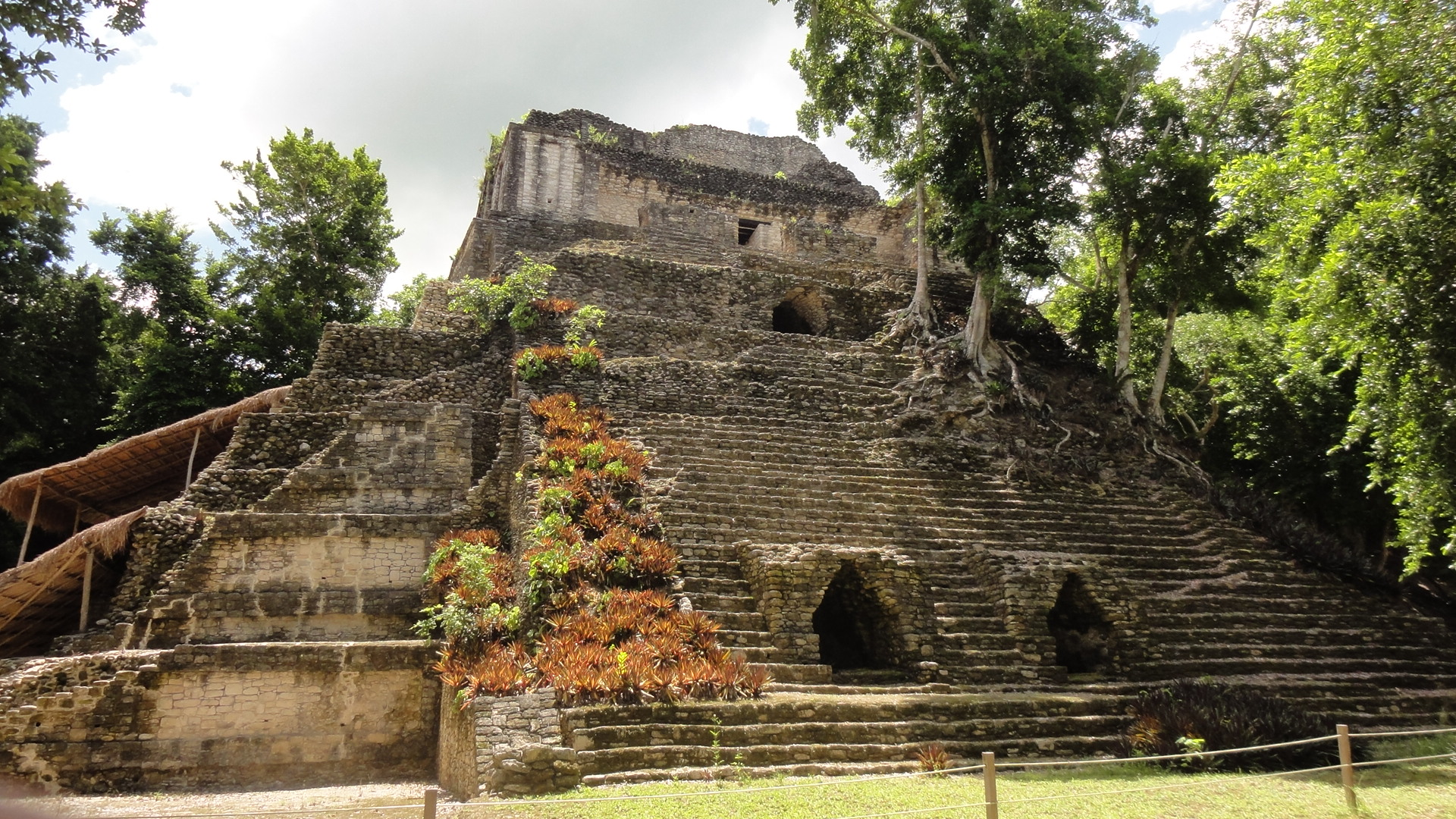
- Temple of the Owl Temple of the Lintels Kinichna South Palace Temple of the Captives Temple of the Cormorants
- Interactive map of Dzibanche
- Type: Ancient Maya city
- Periods: Late Preclassic - Classic - Early Posclassic
- Cultures: Maya civilization
- Location: Mexico
- Region: Quintana Roo

History
- Built: 300 BC
- Built by: Kaan dynasty
- Abandoned: c. 1000 AD

Site notes
- Area: 40 km^{2} (15 sq mi)
- Discovered: 1927

Dzibanche ([tsʼiɓänˈtʃʰe]) (sometimes spelt Tz'ibanche), anciently called Kaanu'l, is an extensive archaeological site of the ancient Maya civilization located in southern Quintana Roo, Mexico. The great Maya city of Dzibanche was the first capital of the Kaan kingdom (Snake kingdom) and the place of origin of the Kaanu'l dynasty, a powerful Maya lineage that conquered and dominated a large territory of the central Maya lowlands during the Mesoamerican Classic period.

The initial settlement of the site dates to the Preclassic period (around 300 BC). During the Early Classic period between the late 4th and early 5th century, the Kaanu'l dynasty of Dzibanche started a great military expansion through a complex strategy of military conquests and alliances, they subordinated sites and achieved victories against major Maya cities. During its zenith Dzibanche constitud the most powerful Maya city of the entire region and the Kaan kingdom became the dominant hegemony of the Maya Lowlands for two centuries. In the year 636, a part of the Kaan lineage of Dzibanche divided and settled in the city of Calakmul, establishing it as their second capital. The part of the Kaanu'l family that remained at Dzibanche continued the development of the city and archived victories against near sites until around the 11th century when the city was abandoned.

Dzibanche is one of the largest cities in the Maya region, the site has a great extension of over 60km² including the agricultural zones and consists of 4 monumental architectural groups identified as the Main Group (Dzibanche), Tutil, Lamay and the great acropolis of Kinichná. The city has an advanced urban design planned to divide ceremonial and productive activities, all the architectural groups are connected by a large network of Sacbe causeways, this pre-Hispanic road system also connects Dzibanche with other large Maya city called Ichkabal. The architectural groups include large palatial buildings, monumental pyramids and large ceremonial structures such as the Temple of the Owl and the Temple of the Cormorants where the burial chambers and tombs of some rulers of the Kaanu'l dynasty have been found.

== Location and etymology ==
The glyph of the Kaanu'l (Kaan) dynasty and original toponym of Dzibanche

The original name of the city was Kaanu'l, meaning "place of snakes", and from this toponym also takes its name the city's ruling dynasty.

The name Dzibanche means "writing on wood" (Ts'íiba'an che') in Maya language, this name was given to the site after it was rediscovered in 1927 by Thomas Gann in reference to the discovery of the sculpted wooden lintels engraved with calendar inscriptions in the structure known as the Temple of the Lintels (Building 6).

Dzibanche is situated in the south of Mexico's Quintana Roo state, 130 kilometres (81 mi) northeast of the contemporary city of Chetumal. The ruins of the city lie a short distance inland from the Bacalar Lagoon on a raised area surrounded by an extensive area of seasonal swampland, known as a bajo, featuring particularly fertile soils. Other near Maya sites are Ichkabal, Pol Box, Akalak, Nicolas Bravo and El Resbalón.

== History ==
During the Early Classic period of Mesoamerican chronology the city was the seat of the Kaan kingdom dynasty that later ruled from Calakmul to the southwest; Dzibanche appears to have been the Kaan capital in the 5th and 6th centuries. The hieroglyphic stairway at Dzibanche contains the earliest known use of the Kaan dynasty Emblem glyph, dated to AD 495.

The Kaan dynasty of Dzibanche started a great territorial expansion conquering and having domain of near sites of southern Quintana Roo and Campeche like El Resbalón, Los Alacranes, Pol Box and Dzibantunich, sites where monuments with hieroglyphic mentions to the Kaan dynasty have been found, and also having military alliances with further sites like Naranjo and El Caracol. The great expansion of the Kaan dynasty power and influence came with conflicts with the rulers of Tikal when it reached near their territory, the influence and control of Dzibanche in sites of northern Petén made it easy to penetrate the Tikal domains achieving effective attacks that ended with the defeat of Tikal and victory of Dzibanche in 562 AD.

Around 580 to 590, the Kaan dynasty apparently moved their dynastic seat to Calakmul. At the end of the Terminal Classic period, Dzibanche was one of the last cities in the Maya area to create a dated hieroglyphic text, in AD 909.

== Site description ==
Dzibanche was the original seat and birthplace of the Kaan dynasty (Snake), one of the most powerful Maya lineages who stablished an hegemonic state during the Classic Period of the Maya civilization. At its peak, Dzibanche dominated most of the Maya Lowlands through a strategy of conquest and military alliances with major sites. It is a large Classic Maya city in the middle of the jungle of southern Quintana Roo featuring monumental architecture within an area of 60 km² in which four large architectural complexes are distributed: the Main Group (or Dzibanche), Lamay, Tutil and Kinichna, that include extensive civic-ceremonial plazas with numerous residential structures, royal palaces, ceremonial temples, large pyramids, platforms, a market and ball courts, all connected by wide sacbe causeways, pre-Hispanic white paved roads. The K'inichna' Pyramid is a large temple located outside of the site core. The Lamay Group is a small outlying architectural group that formed a part of the city. The city features architecture in the Peten style and a unique local architectural style characteristic of the Kaan dynasty known as Paired Pilasters. Numerous royal tombs of rulers and members of the Kaanu'l dynasty have been found within its structures, showing the great power they attained with opulent offerings of obsidian, shell, and jade artifacts, a common mortuary tradition of the Kaan family. The city is lavishly decorated with monuments glorifying the military victories of the Kaanu'l dynasty, as well as with representations of the mythological aspects attributed to this lineage, which were used to legitimize and reaffirm their authority and divine power in the region.

=== Main Group (Dzibanche) ===
The Dzibanche group, also known as the Main Group to distinguish it from the rest of the site, constituted the great civic-ceremonial center and political core of the city. It is a monumental architectural complex consisting of several structures including large pyramids, temples, and palatial buildings where the Kaanu'l royal family resided, the excavated parts of the complex are distributed primarily around three extensive plazas: Gann Plaza, Xibalba Plaza, and Pom Plaza.

==== Temple of the Lintels ====
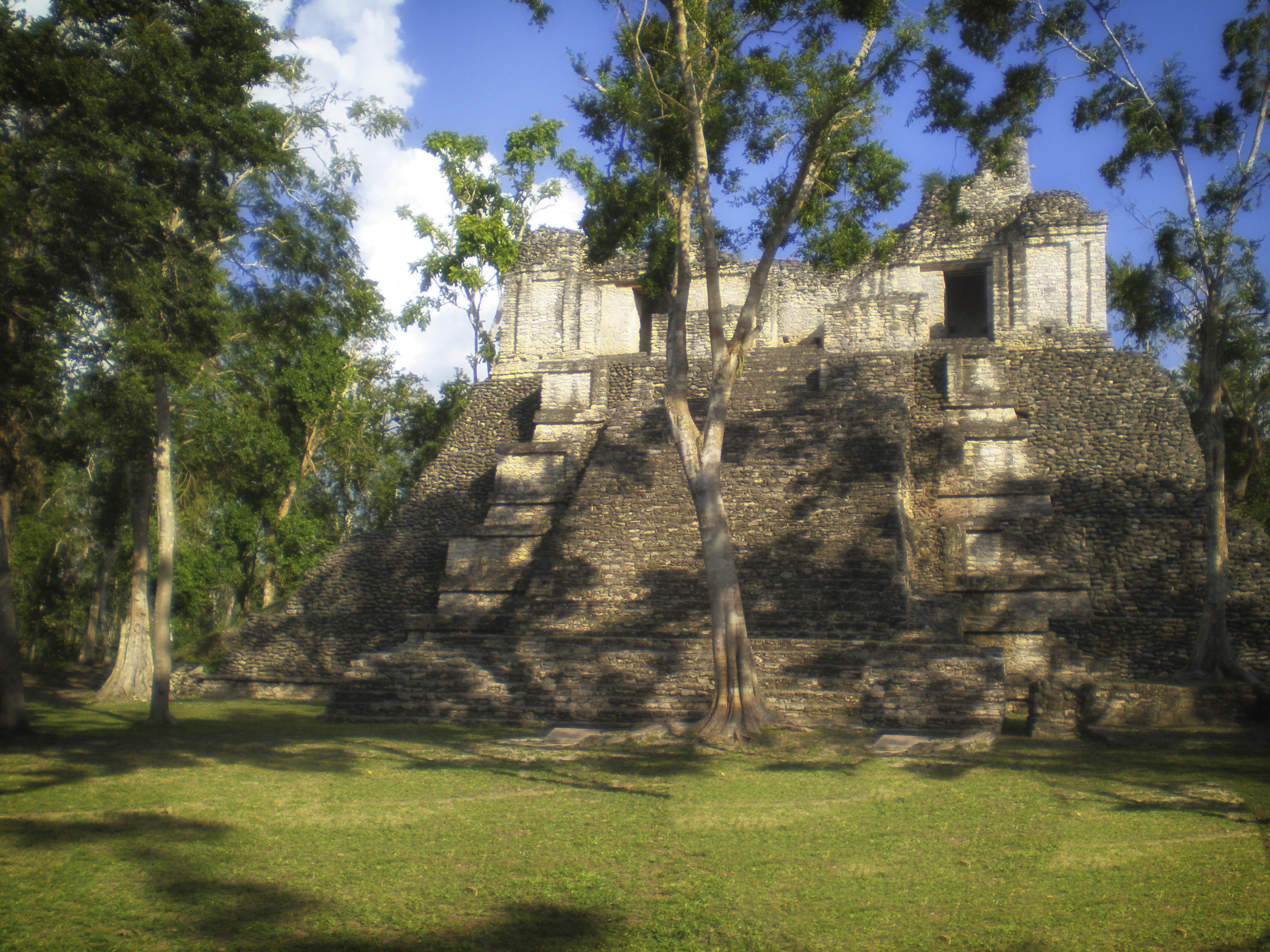
The Temple of the Lintels at Dzibanche

The Temple of the Lintels or Building 6 is a four level large stepped pyramid built in the talud-tablero architectural style, topped by a well preserved large temple featuring two vaulted rooms inside and remains of a tall roof comb. The structure is named after the discovery of a large wooden lintel carved with hieroglyphic inscriptions inside one of the vaulted rooms conmemorating the entronization of the ruler K'ahk' Ti' Ch'ich' in 550 AD. This lintel found by Thomas Gann in 1927 is from where he took the modern name of the site "Dzibanche", which translates to "writing on wood".

==== Gann Plaza ====
The Gann Plaza (or Plaza Gann) is an extensive ceremonial area in the core of the Main Group that was used for public civic and religious ceremonies in the city. It is named after Thomas Gann, the first archaeologist to visit and document the site. This plaza is surrounded by major structures including the Temple of the Captives to the west, the Temple of the Toucans (Building 16) to the north, the Pop Palace (Building 11) to the south and the Temple of the Cormorants to the east.

==== Temple of the Captives ====
Its a large platform with a large hieroglyphic stairway depicting sculpted representations of bound captives, captured by Yuknoom Chʼeen I, a king of the Kaan dynasty. One of these captives is named as Yax Kʼahkʼ Joloʼm and, although his place of origin is not mentioned in the accompanying text, the form of his name indicates that he came from a city relatively close to Dzibanche itself. At least two of sculpted blocks may date to the 5th century AD.

==== Temple of the Owl ====
The Temple of the Owl (Building 1) is The Temple of the Owl, also known as Building 1 or Temple I, is an Early Classic funerary and ceremonial structure consisting of a large stepped pyramid topped by a temple with a roof comb at its summit. It is located behind the Temple of the Cormorants in the Xibalba Plaza. Like the Temple of the Inscriptions at Palenque, the Temple of the Owl base contains a three level stairway leading to a chamber with a royal tomb. The tomb inside the pyramid is dated to around 400 AD and contained the skeletal remains of a high-ranking woman accompanied by a rich offering consisting of ceramic vessels, bowls, jade necklaces and a pectoral made of white shell (spondylus) carved with the image of a ruler and decorated with jade inlays. This structure was named the Temple of the Owl in reference to a ceramic vessel with an owl-shaped lid that was part of the burial.

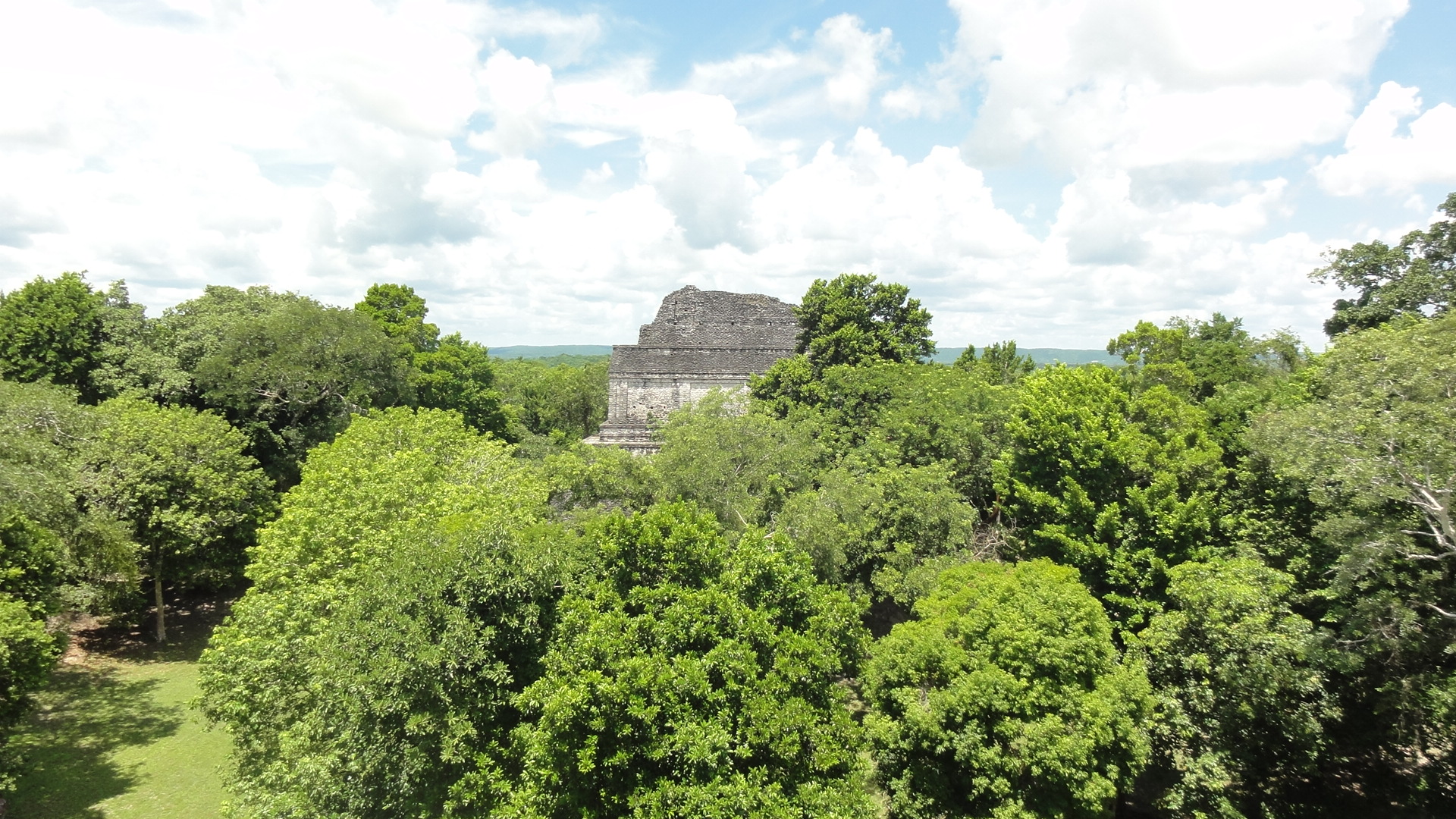
The Temple of the Cormorants seen from the Temple of the Owl

==== Temple of the Cormorants ====
The Temple of the Cormorants (Building 2) is the largest pyramid at the Main Group of Dzibanche. This structure consists of a large pyramidal base crowned with a very tall temple that features a large roof comb. It was built during the 5th century AD using the Teotihuacan-influenced talud-tablero style of Maya architecture. The pyramid is decorated with friezes that were sculpted from stucco and coated with red paint; the friezes feature symbols that are also in the Teotihuacan style. The inside of the pyramidal base is a sacred mausoleum where several tombs have been found with the remains of some members of the Kaanu'l lineage accompanied by rich funerary offerings of jade maks, ceramic vessels and obsidian objects. The most important burial inside the pyramid is the royal tomb of the ruler Sky Witness who ruled the city between 572 and 598 AD. This royal burial was named the Tomb of the Lord of Dzibanche due to the richness of the grave goods found inside; the skeletal remains were found on a jaguar pelt alongside a large funerary offering consisting of painted ceramic vessels and jade masks. It was named the Temple of the Cormorants after the discovery of a vase decorated with cormorants.

Funerary offerings of the Temple of the Cormorants

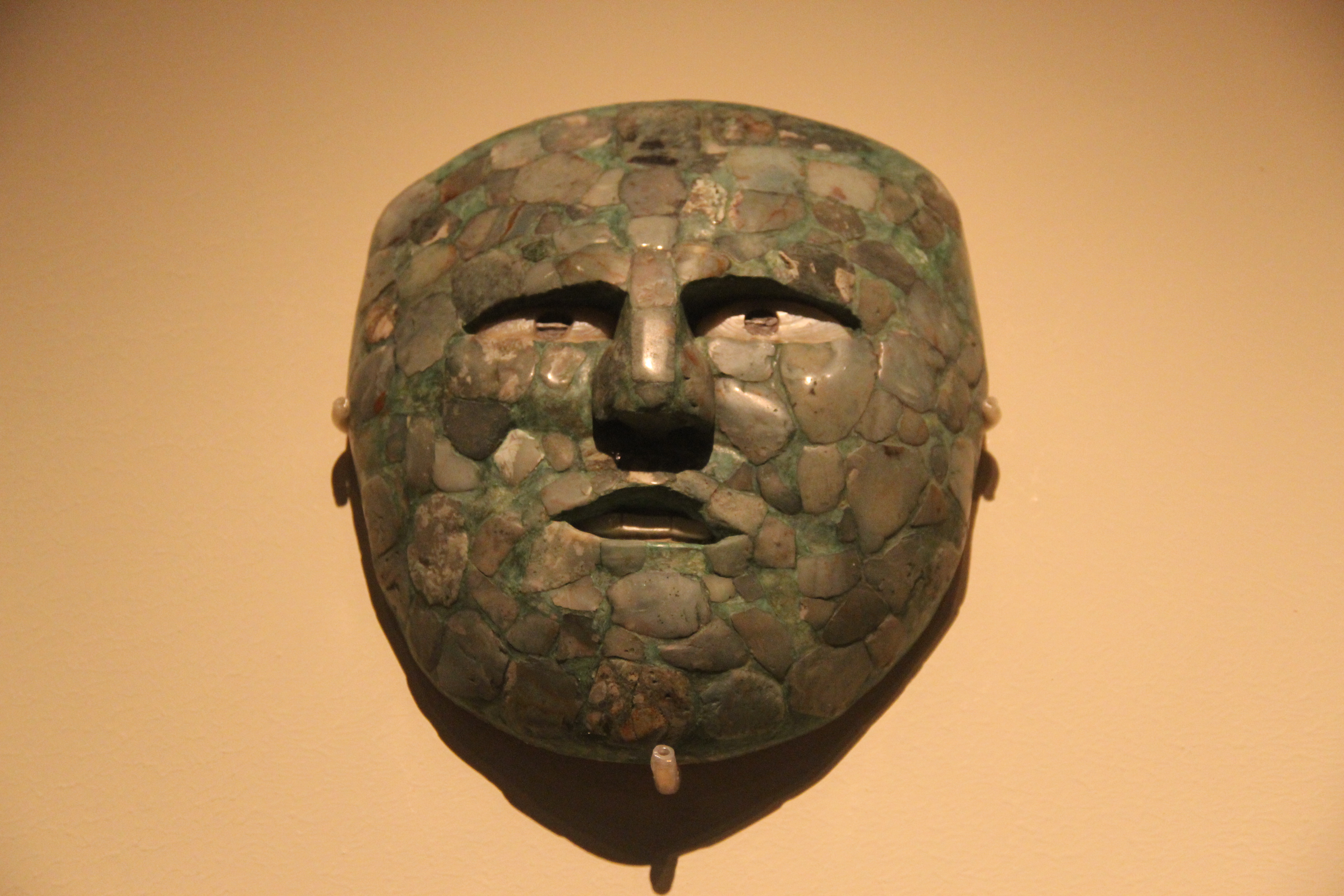
Jade mask from a cist burial

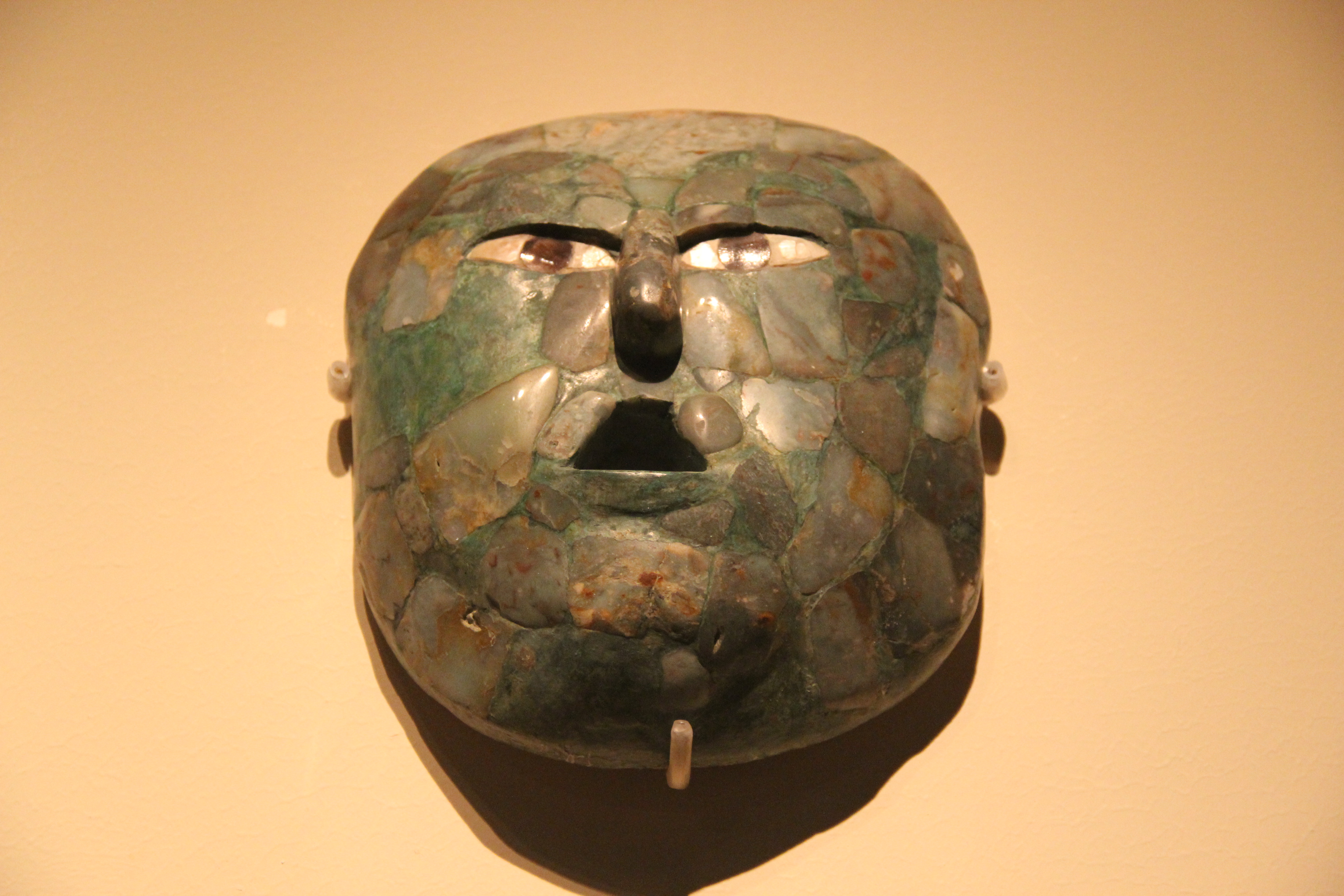
Jade mask from the burial chamber 2

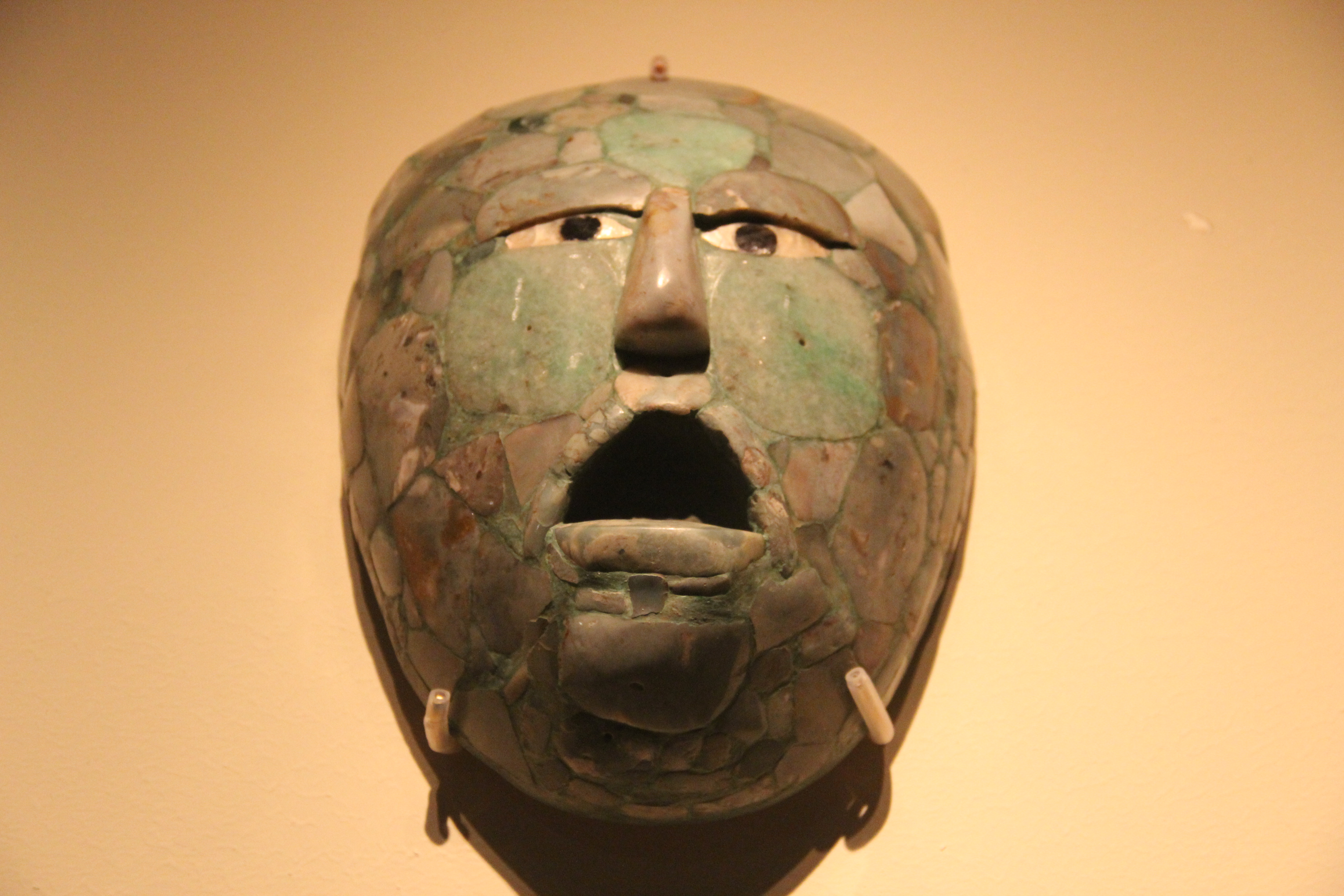
Jade mask from the burial chamber 4

=== Kinichná ===
The Kʼinich Naʼ Pyramid ("House of the Sun God") is a monumental triadic pyramid 35 meters high, complemented by a series of low buildings around a plaza, which may have served as platforms for smaller temples or as residential buildings located approximately 2 kilometres (1.2 mi) north of the site core. It was named after a stucco element with the representation of the K'in glyph (sun), which is preserved on the back of the upper temple of the acropolis. The main structure known as the Acropolis of Kinichna is surrounded by a number of smaller palace-type structures and the group is linked to the site core by a causeway. The group was likely to be the home of an elite lineage group and was placed to extend the city's region of control over the northern parts of the surrounding bajo. Several royal tombs have been discovered inside the structure containing the burial of some members of the Kaan lineage accompanied by jade offerings, the most notable is the tomb found on the Temple of the Jaguar located at the top of the structure.

==== Temple of the Jaguar ====
The temple at the summit of the Kinichna pyramid is known as the Temple of the Jaguar, a large vaulted building with remains of a large roof comb. In this temple was found a large burial with the skeletons of two people and a jaguar surrounded by a rich funerary offering made up of jewels and jade artifacts such as necklaces, bracelets, ear ornaments and a mask. It has been suggested that this is the royal burial of Yuknoom Ch'een I.

== Gallery ==
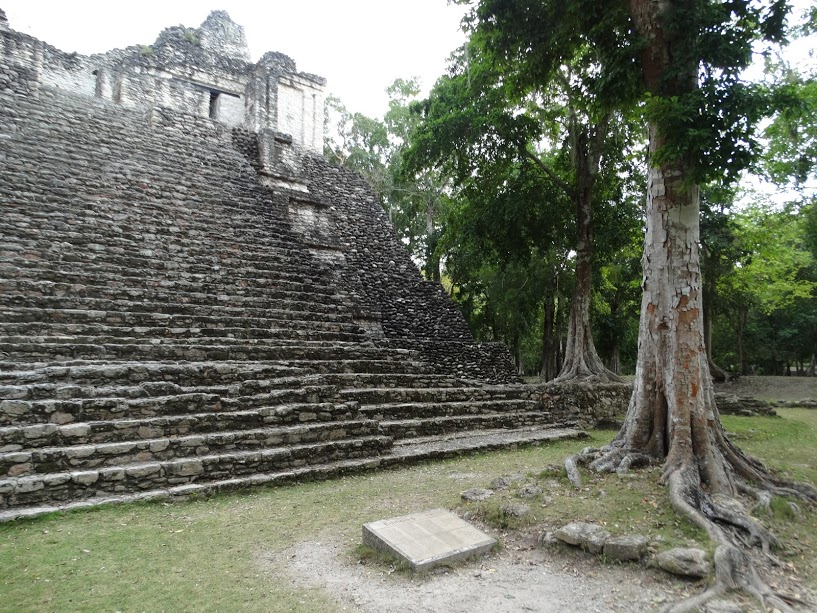

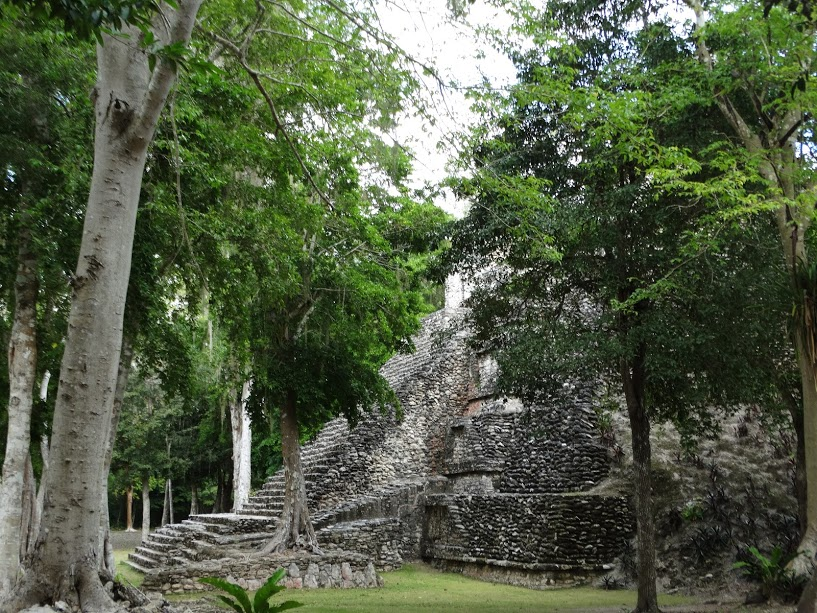

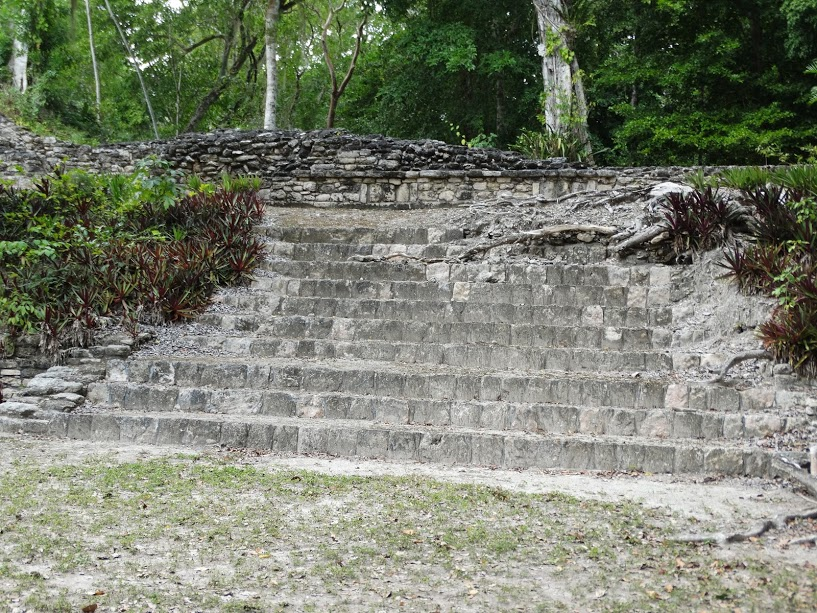

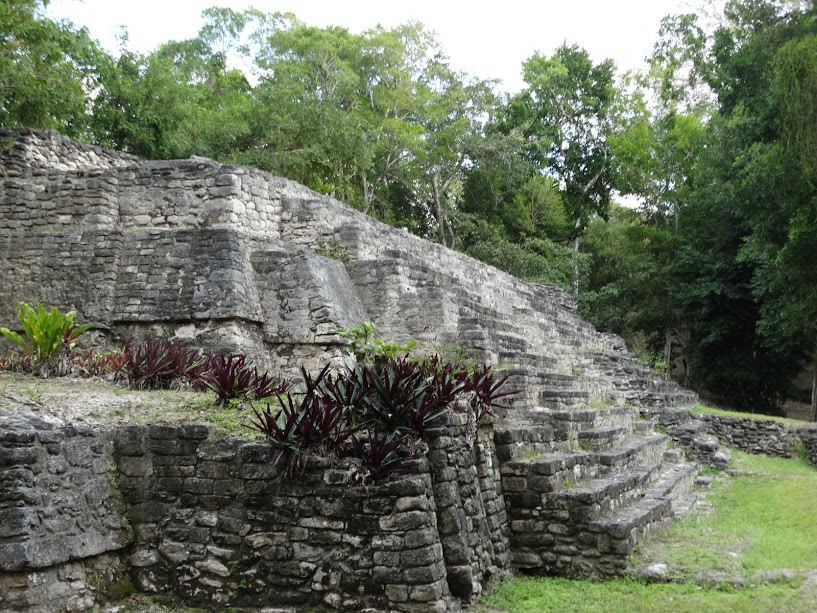

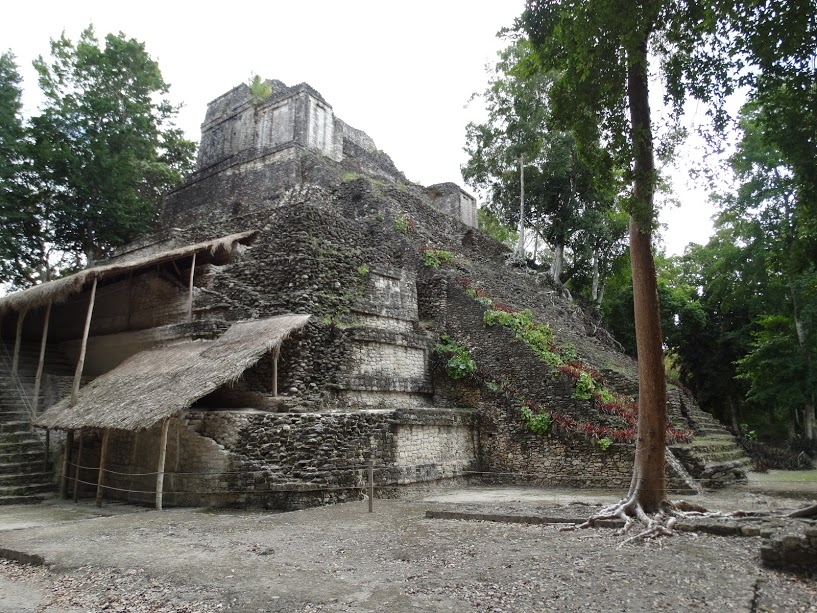
