= Kaan kingdom =

Maya kingdom from the Classic period ruled by the Kaanu'l dynasty of Dzibanche

Kaan kingdom Kaanu'l Ajawlel
- 4th century–10th century
- Emblem glyph
- Capital: Dzibanche (300-635); Calakmul (635-10th century)
- Official languages: Classical Chʼoltiʼ
- Religion: Maya religion
- Government: Monarchy
- Kuhul Kaan Ajaw
  - 402-455: Yuknoom Ch'een I
  - 520-546: Tuun K'ab' Hix
  - 550-568: K'ahk' Ti' Ch'ich'
  - 561-572: Ut Chanal
  - 572-579: Yax Yopaat
  - 579-611: Uneh Chan
  - 619-622: Yuknoom Ti' Chan
  - 622-630: Tajoom Ukʼab Kʼahkʼ
  - 636-686: Yuknoom Ch'een II
  - 686-698: Yuknoom Yichʼaak Kʼahkʼ
  - 702-736: Yuknoom Tookʼ Kʼawiil
- Historical era: Classic Maya period
  - Established: 4th century
  - Disestablished: 10th century

The Kaan kingdom (Snake Head kingdom) was a Maya kingdom ruled by the Kaanu'l dynasty of Dzibanche, later centered in Calakmul, that dominated the central Maya lowlands during the Classic period of the Maya civilization.

The kingdom was established already in the 4th century at Dzibanche by the Kaanu'l dynasty, one of the lineages with the greatest political and military power recorded in the history of the Maya civilization. The Kaan kingdom was a dominant entity in the Maya lowlands, reaching its peak of power and influence between around 500 and 750 AD. At the year 636 the capital was moved from Dzibanche to Calakuml, where it had hegemony over the region for at least another century. The kingdom then gradually lost its power and influence until the collapse of the Maya civilization during the terminal Classic period, becoming extinct by early 10th century.

The rulers of the Kaan kingdom were known as K'uhul Kaanul Ajaw, meaning "Divine Lord of Kaan". Its most prominent ruler was Yuknoom Ch'een II, also known as Yuknoom the Great who ruled for 50 years (636-686), he archived numerous military victories and expanded the hegemony of the Kaan kingdom to the height of its power.

== History ==
The origin of the Kaan dynasty was in the city of Dzibanche, originally known by the toponym of Kaanu'l, which means 'Place of Snakes' and is where the ruling monarchy of the city takes its name. The mythological origins of the dynasty are represented in the lintels and murals of Dzibanche, where a divine origin is attributed to its rulers and they are related to intertwined snakes.

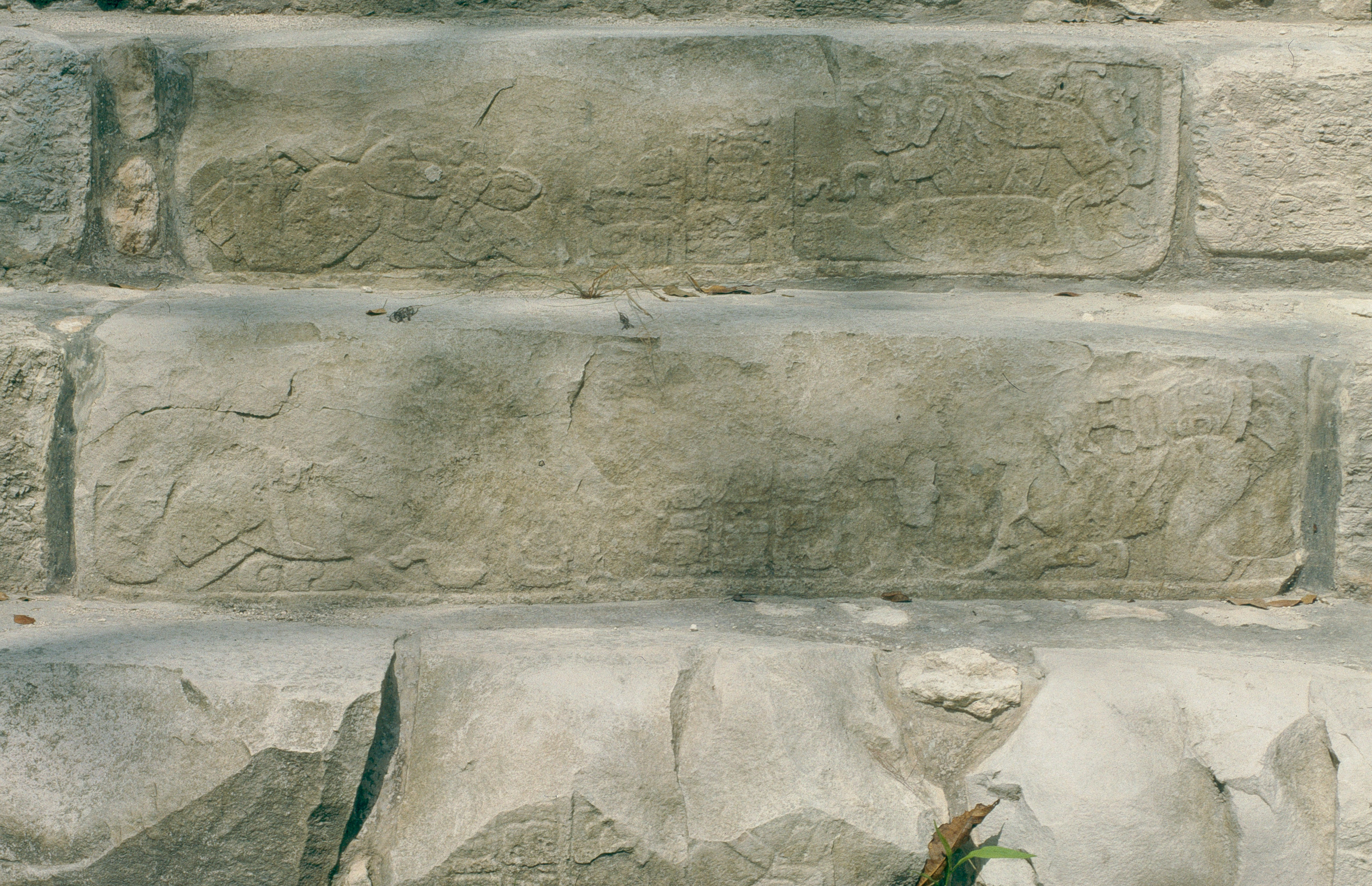
Hieroglyphic staircase of the Temple of the Captives.

Among the earliest historical and epigraphic mentions of the Kaanu'l dynasty and its emblem glyph are found on the hieroglyphic staircase of the Temple of the Captives or Temple 13 of Dzibanche. One of the earliest rulers of the Kaan dynasty we know of was Yuknoom Ch'een I of Dzibanché. His government began in the classic period of the Maya civilization at the beginning of the 5th century. During the 6th century, the Kaan kingdom and its rulers began military campaigns, establishing alliances, supervising the enthronizations in allied places, and making nearby sites tributary in order to control the trade routes. In this period, the influence of Dzibanche spread throughout the region and the emblem glyph of the Kaanu'l was recorded in some monuments of several subordinate neighboring sites such as El Resbalón, Pol Box and Los Alacranes. A lintel in Yaxchilan mentions and records the capture of a vassal of the ruler Tuun K’ab' Hix showing that the influence of Dzibanche and the Kaan had already reached the far region of the Usumacinta river.

These expansion campaigns brought Dzibanche into conflict to the south with Tikal, a regional power established by Teotihuacan that also wanted the control of the region starting a historic rivalry for dominance in the Maya lowlands that lasted throughout the Classic period. In 562, the ruler K'ahk' Ti' Ch'ich' Ajsaakil of Dzibanche defeated Tikal, ending with its regional power and leaving Dzibanche and the Kaan kingdom as the ruling hegemony of the Maya lowlands for the next two centuries. The war campaigns continued with the ruler Uneh Chan achieving important victories for the Kaan kingdom against Palenque, the capital of the B'aakal kingdom in 599 and 611, with this the power of the Kaanu'l had already surpassed the rest of the states in the Maya lowlands. In the year 636 the Kaanu'l dynasty faced internal problems, Waxaklajuun Ubah Chan the successor to the throne of Dzibanche was overthrown by another member of the Kaan dynasty identified as Yuknoom Head, causing the lineage to split into two factions, with one part remaining in Dzibanche while the other part of the lineage settled in Calakmul, establishing the city as the new capital of the Kaan kingdom. For several years, the Kaan already had influence in the city of Calakmul, originally called Ux Te' Tuun, and which previously used the Chiik Nahb glyph. Dzibanche recovered from this internal crisis and remained as a political power center governed by a part of the Kaanu'l dynasty who achieved some victories against neighboring sites and continued with the urban development of the city.

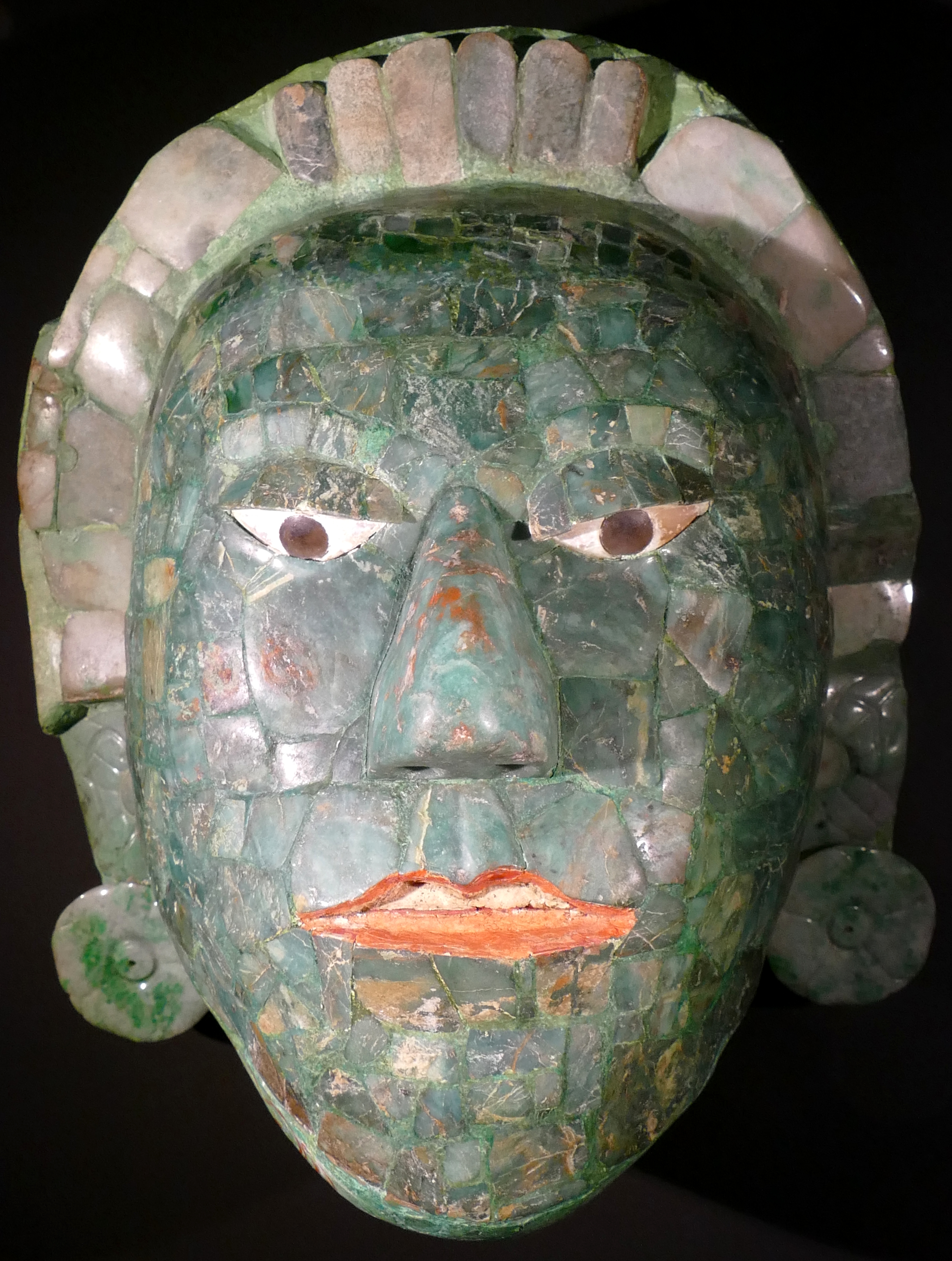
Jade funerary mask of Yuknoom Ch'een II.

Yuknoom Ch'een II, also known as Yuknoom “The Great” for his conquest victories, was the first ruler of the Kaan dynasty in Calakmul, he ruled for 50 years from 636 to 686 being the most powerful ruler of the Kaan kingdom and the one who would turn Calakmul into a superpower with several alliances and tributary vassal sites. During his reign the Kaan kingdom had its peak of influence and its greatest political and economic power. In 657 Calakmul invaded and defeated Tikal again, conquering the city and turning its ruler Nuun Ujol Chaak into a vassal. In 686 Yuknoom Yich'aak K'ahk' came to power, by that time Tikal was beginning to re-emerge and in the year 695 it achieved an important victory against Calakmul, politically weakening the Kaan kingdom and reducing its hegemonic regime. Calakmul maintained some of its most important alliances, although it never recovered the power achieved with Yuknoom Ch'een II. Later rulers managed to maintain political stability in the kingdom, but by 744 Tikal defeated and destroyed El Naranjo and El Perú, two major allies of Calakmul and one of its major routes of influence was destroyed, with this began the political decline of the Kaan kingdom.
