= Preclassic period in Belize =

Historical period in Belize, 2000 BC – AD 250

Coordinates: 17.0°N 88.5°W

Preclassic
- 2000 BC – AD 250
Preceramic	Classic
- Location: Belize
- Including: Early (to 1000 BC); Middle (to 400 BC); Late (to AD 100); Terminal (to AD 250)
- Monarchs: Yax Ehb Xook (first of Tikal); Foliated Jaguar (second of Tikal); Animal Headdress (third of Tikal)
- Key events: Maya settlement; non-nomadic hamlets established; non-lithic technological development; intensification of farming; increase in social, economic, religious complexity

The Preclassic or Formative period of Belizean, Maya, and Mesoamerican history began with the Maya development of ceramics during 2000 BC – 900 BC, and ended with the advent of Mayan monumental inscriptions in AD 250. (Note: The Preclassic Period is variously dated in literature (see Periodisation of the history of Belize for further discussion). For instance, it is dated from 1200 BC by Stemp et al. 2021, p. 417, 2000 BC – AD 250 by Sharer & Traxler 2006, pp. 98, 155 and Martin & Grube 2008, p. 8, 1500 BC – AD 150 or 1500 BC – AD 300 by Adams & Macleod 2000a, p. 11. It has been suggested that an AD 250 end date for the Preclassic is primarily justified by 'the transition from a society that we perceive as prehistoric owing to its lack of surviving written records, to one where historicity is proclaimed on hundreds of monumental inscriptions' (Adams & Macleod 2000a, pp. 213–214).)

== Geography ==
During the pre-Columbian era, Belize formed part of Mesoamerica. Traditionally, the first-order subdivisions of the latter follow cultural or political boundaries of Preclassic, Classic, or Postclassic civilisations, e.g. Mayas and Aztecs. The Maya Region of Mesoamerica is one such. It, in turn, is further subdivided physiographically into at least three regions, i.e. the Maya Lowlands, Highlands, and Pacific. The first of these second-order subdivisions, which fully encompassed Belize, is still further subdivided into northern, central, and southern portions, called the Northern, Central, and Southern Lowlands. Belizean territory north of Indian Creek i.e. Nim Li Punit is often included within the Central Lowlands, fully encompassing five of Belize's districts, and an upper portion of Toledo. Territory south of Indian Creek, including Nim Li Punit, is often placed within the Southern Lowlands, encompassing the central and lower portions of Toledo. (Note: However, alternative first-order subdivisions of the Maya Region (ie second-order subdivisions of Mesoamerica) are sometimes given, eg Martin & Grube 2008, p. 10 give these as Northern, Central, and Southern Areas, eg Adams & Macleod 2000a, p. 200 give them as Northern Lowlands, Southern Lowlands, and Highlands (though later, in Adams & Macleod 2000a, pp. 203–204, give them as Lowlands and Highlands).)

== Climate ==
It has been suggested that a global climatic drying event may have prompted the development of ceramics, monumental structures, and farming across the Maya Region of Mesoamerica during 1200 BC – 900 BC.

== Demographics ==
The ancestral homeland or urheimat of Mayan speakers, i.e. of proto-Mayas, is most often located either near Soloma, in the southwestern highlands i.e. Sierra Cuchumatanes of Huehuetenango, Guatemala, or in the El Quiche valley, in the central lowlands of Quiché, Guatemala. However, details of proto-Maya or Maya emigration from urheimat into the rest of the Maya Region of Mesoamerica remain uncertain. Generally, though, it is thought that proto-Mayas remained in urheimat, with only their Maya descendants emigrating abroad. For instance, Yukatekan speakers, who are thought to have diverged from proto-Mayan speakers in circa 1900 BC, are not thought to have emigrated from urheimat until several centuries after divergence.

The first Maya settlers of the Lowlands are thought to have co-inhabited said region with pre-existing non-Maya settlers, e.g. Palaeoindians, Xincans, Lenkans, and Tols or Jicaques. However, details of their interactions with these pre-existing settlers remain unclear. In central and southern Belize, the disappearance of lithic technology around 1900 BC has been taken as evidence that Maya settlers replaced or displaced pre-existing Palaeoindian ones. However, in northern Belize, particularly given Preceramic and Preclassic lithic technology at Colha, it has been suggested that Palaeoindian and Maya settlers co-inhabited the region. (Note: Note that all Mayan languages of the Lowlands, eg Yukatekan, lost a number of proto-Mayan phonemes, and, furthermore, some non-Mayan languages of the Lowlands gained proto-Mayan or Mayan phonemes, lexemes, or loanwords (Stemp et al. 2021, p. 428). It has been further suggested that 'some of the lexical items that distinguish lowland Mayan languages from their highland counterparts may have been loaned, shaped, or calqued from the original Archaic language(s) [eg Xinkan, Lenkal, Tol] of the lowlands' (Stemp et al. 2021, p. 428).)

== Technology ==
=== Ceramic ===
It is uncertain whether the earliest ceramic traditions i.e. complexes of the Lowlands were foreign imports or local innovations. It has been suggested that all early ceramic complexes of Belize and the surrounding Lowlands were indigenous developments with few or no connections to previously existing traditions outside the Maya Region. However, it has also been suggested that some of these, i.e. the Cunil and Jenney Creek complexes of the Upper Belize River Valley, were developed by Mixe–Zoquean speakers of Honduras and subsequently imported. By the Middle Preclassic, however, population growth and interaction lead to the harmonisation of ceramic traditions. The first widespread ceramic tradition is thought to be Mamon, characterised by red-slipped or Juventud Red bowls, and commonly dated to 600 BC. (Note: Sharer & Traxler 2006, p. 202 date the Mamom complex to circa 700–400 BC. The Chicanel ceramic complex is noted as a Mamom-successor style, reaching widespread adoption throughout the Lowlands during circa 400 BC to AD 100 (Sharer & Traxler 2006, p. 254).)

The earliest pre-Mamon ceramic traditions in Belize and surrounding Lowlands are most often dated to at least 1000 BC, though there is still much debate regarding details. Pre-Mamon ceramic complexes have been discovered in Cuello and Cahal Pech, and more recently in Colha, Blackman Eddy, and Xunantunich. Finely-made tecomates and non-utilitarian ceramics, especially figurines and ocarinas, appear upon the advent of non-nomadic hamlets in Belize and surrounding Lowlands. These are taken as indicative of increasing socioeconomic complexity, as they are believed to have been employed in symbolic or ritual functions, like feasts and burials.

Prominent Preclassic ceramic complexes of Belize.
Complex	Start	Unit	End	Unit	Sites	Notes
Cunil	1200	cal BC	900	cal BC	Cahal Pech, Upper Belize River Valley	aka Kanocha
Swasey	1000	cal BC	800	cal BC	Cuello	
Jenney Creek	900	cal BC	300	cal BC	Cahal Pech, Upper Belize River Valley	aka Kaluk, Kanluk
Bladen	800	BC	600	BC	Cuello	
Lopez	600	BC	400	BC	Cuello	
Barton Creek	300	cal BC	300	cal AD	Upper Belize River Valley	

=== Lithic ===
The use of Preceramic lithic tools continued into the Preclassic. Colha, for instance, is known to have produced and distributed burin-spall drills, macroblades, bifacial celts, wedge-form adzes, T-shaped adzes, and constricted unifaces throughout northern and central Belize. A lack of standardised forms, and absence of identifiable workshops, have been taken to suggest that lithic tool production was organised as a cottage industry, with manufacturing based within residences, alongside other domestic activities. (Note: Though Sharer & Traxler 2006, pp. 261–262 disagree, noting Colha provides 'secure evidence for the mass production of chert tools [...] in the Late Preclassic, suggesting that full-time craft production was well under way at Colha by this period,' and further pointing out that over 'one-third of the eighty-nine chert tool workshops [in Colha] dated to the later Classic period began production in the Late Preclassic.') The production of bifaces and adzes has been taken as indicative of 'an increased need for tools used for land clearance and field maintenance associated with horticulture.'

=== Exotic ===
Preclassic shell beads and other ornaments have been excavated at sites in northern and central Belize, including Colha, Blackman Eddy, K'axob, and Pacbitun. As marine shell beads have also been excavated at Preclassic settlements further inland, like Tikal and Seibal in Guatemala, it is thought that at least some of their production in Belize was destined for long-distance trade. The Preclassic further saw the development of greenstone and obsidian tools and ritual artefacts, and cotton textiles. Greenstone polished celts, beads, and triangulates have been recovered in sites across the country. The earliest obsidian tools, appearing first as hard-hammer flakes, then as prismatic blades, were introduced in circa 1000 BC, with raw or worked obsidian likely sourced from the Guatemalan Highlands. Preceramic floral remains indicate the presence of cotton in northern and central Belize by 2200 cal BC – 1000 cal BC, to which period are dated ceramic spindle whorls and bone needles recovered from the same regions. Additionally, plaster with a textile impression recovered from Cahal Pech, thought to date to 1200 cal BC – 900 cal BC, revealed that the impressed 'fabric was constructed of single-ply yarns with a Z-twist.'

The appearance of exotic goods, particularly in dedicatory and terminatory deposits or caches across Belize and the surrounding Lowlands, is often taken to signal an increase in socioeconomic complexity, social inequality, and power among an emerging elite class.

== Economy ==
=== Agriculture ===
Preclassic floral remains provide evidence of increasing deforestation and development of slash-and-burn milpas or farms in Belize and the wider Maya Lowlands, with maize, cassava, beans, chili peppers, calabash, and squash as main cultivars. The intensification of agriculture during the Preclassic necessitated extensive landscaping beyond forest clearance, including the construction of canals, raised fields, and terraces. These features have proven difficult to date, though their first appearance in northern Belize is thought to date to circa 1000 BC.

=== Trade ===
Settlements in Belize and the surrounding Lowlands are thought to have engaged in long-distance, riverine or overland trade, particularly in tools and ritual artefacts of exotic materials like marine shells, greenstone, and obsidian. For instance, Cahal Pech is thought to have begun importing exotic goods from outside the Lowlands as early as 1200 cal BC – 900 cal BC, including obsidian from the Highlands, greenstone from the Motagua Valley in southeastern Guatemala, and queen conch shells from coastal Caribbean settlements. Northern Belize, particularly Colha, is thought to have engaged in short-distance trade i.e. trade within the Lowlands, particularly in lithic tools. (Note: Further, in southern Belize, the discovery of a Middle Preclassic jade spoon in Uxbenka, likely of Olmec origin, has been deemed 'sparse evidence of interaction between the Maya lowlands and the [Olmec] Gulf Coast' (Sharer & Traxler 2006, p. 202).)

== Society ==
=== Language ===
The ancestral form of all Mayan languages is called proto-Mayan. Its history, phonology, syntax, grammar, and lexicon have been studied since at least the 1960s, and 'have now been worked out in great detail.' It is thought to have been in close contact with proto-Mije–Sokean, a language most often associated with the Locona people of the Gulf, Isthmus, and Soconusco regions of Mesoamerica, given that later Mayan languages exhibit loanwords of proto-Mije–Sokean origin.

The divergence of proto-Mayan into distinct Mayan languages is most commonly dated to circa 2200 BC. This date, however, was obtained from glottochronological analysis, a linguistic tool which is 'now largely abandoned, given its many difficulties and its uncorroborated founding assumptions.' More recent attempts to date the divergence have employed disparate methods, and yielded widely disparate results, ranging from circa 6600 BC to circa 209 BC. (Note: Divergence as per glottochronological analysis dated to between circa 2000 BC – AD 100 by Sharer & Traxler 2006, p. 26.)

=== Arts and sciences ===
The Late Preclassic saw the adoption or diffusion of various arts and sciences across the Lowlands, including hieroglyphic script writing, vigesimal arithmetic, and Long Count calendar time-keeping. (Note: No Preclassic codices survive, such that the extant corpus from this period is composed only of inscriptions on stone monuments, on smaller non-perishable artefacts (eg bone tools, ceramic vases), and paintings on murals (eg those in San Bartolo, Guatemala) (Sharer & Traxler 2006, pp. 120, 129–130). Further, there is at least one example of Middle Preclassic hieroglyphic writing elsewhere in the Maya Region (Sharer & Traxler 2006, p. 224).) (Note: Though Sharer & Traxler 2006, p. 110 notes Long Count dates 'first appear on Late Preclassic monuments in the southern Maya area and are later found throughout the Maya lowlands during the Classic period.') Furthermore, during this sub-period, non-hieroglyphic artistic illustrations and portrayals increasingly tended towards a characteristically distinct Maya style. These developments have been described as 'the first blossoming of what is often called civilisation.' Notably, the introduction of mathematical zero during this sub-period has been deemed 'the earliest known instance of this concept.'

=== Culture ===
The Preclassic is generally characterised by increasing socioeconomic and ideological complexity in Belize and surrounding Lowlands. Details of the increase in social complexity and inequality in the Early to Middle Preclassic have proven difficult to ascertain, though broad strokes are often gleaned from architecture, burials, and material culture. For instance, the period saw the production and long-distance trade of non-functional, exotic goods, of ceramic, marine shells, greenstone, and obsidian, employed in increasingly standardised rituals, such as feasts and burials.

==== Mortuary ====
Mortuary practices are thought to have become increasingly more complex, standardised, and public throughout the Preclassic. Grave goods, often ceramic and shell artefacts, e.g. carved jute snail-shells, have been excavated in early burials, which are first documented as simple pits or cist graves below private residences, and later as public interments in round structures, E-Groups, and platforms. At Cuello, Middle Preclassic burials dated to circa 900 BC – 600 BC, particularly graves of children, have been found with exotic items of ceramic, marine shell, and greenstone. Wealthier graves first appear by the end of the Middle Preclassic, including, for instance, graves unearthed at Cahal Pech with jade, slate plaques, drilled animal teeth, marine shell discs, and ceramic figurines.

==== Infrastructural ====
Similarly, infrastructure in settled hamlets is thought to have become more complex and public throughout the period. Early specialised structures, dated to circa 900 BC, have been excavated at Cahal Pech, Cuello, and Blackman Eddy, with the uncovered sweathouse in Cuello being the earliest known instance in the Lowlands. Further afield, ball courts and temple complexes dated to 1000–400 BC have been unearthed 'at some two dozen sites in northwestern Yucatán.' It has been suggested that wealthy or elite individuals, at least in central Belize, may have appropriated iconographic motifs common in Cunil pottery 'to demonstrate special knowledge of a sacred cosmos,' and to sponsor the construction of ceremonial architecture, trade in exotic goods, and the celebration of public rituals, leading to an increasingly socioeconomically stratified society. At Blackman Eddy, the appearance of a sizeable midden with tens of thousands of freshwater shells, and finely-decorated ceramic wares, has been taken as possible evidence of feasting.

=== Cuisine ===
Maize, an established staple in Belize and the Lowlands by the onset of the Preclassic, is thought to have been boiled and treated with lime to make nixtamal i.e. hominy. Preclassic Maya settlers, however, did not exclusively rely on farmed produce like maize, beans, and squash, as game and foraged goods have been documented across northern and central Belize, including craboo, hogplum, guava, soursop, cassava, sweet potato, cacao, deer, dogs, peccary, armadillo, agouti, rabbits, turtles, birds, reptiles, fish, and molluscs. Generally though, Preclassic Maya cuisine in the Lowlands is thought to have focussed less on large game, compared to the Preceramic Palaeoindian diet, and more on smaller domesticated animals, i.e. dogs and turkeys, and foraged marine molluscs, e.g. jute snails.

== Government ==
The earliest (Early to Middle Preclassic) non-nomadic settlements across the Lowlands are thought to have been 'initially organised into autonomous egalitarian communities.' Little beyond this, however, is known. It has nonetheless been suggested that during circa 800–400 BC 'a number of emerging polity capitals jockeyed for power and advantage across the Maya lowlands,' with Nakbe (in the El Mirador Basin, Guatemala) noted as a likely example of such an emerging capital. (Note: Further, it has been suggested that Blackman Eddy may have been raided and burnt in circa 700 BC, given burn-damage to Str. B1-4th (Sharer & Traxler 2006, pp. 208–210).) This shift from single-hamlet polities towards multi-hamlet states ruled by a dominant capital becomes particularly noticeable during the Late Preclassic, with El Mirador (likewise in the El Mirador Basin) noted as the pre-eminent example of such a capital. (Note: El Mirador has been described as 'the largest Late Preclassic capital in the Maya lowlands' and 'the largest known site for its time in the Maya area and one of the largest Late Preclassic centres in all of Mesoamerica,' with the polity over which it ruled described as 'the first state in the Maya lowlands' and 'the largest and most powerful Late Preclassic kingdom in the Maya lowlands' (Sharer & Traxler 2006, pp. 252, 259, 261–262). Sharer & Traxler 2006, p. 259 further suggest it exerted 'political dominance over the central lowlands in the Late Preclassic period,' possibly making it the first regional hegemony in Belize and the Lowlands. Sharer & Traxler 2006, pp. 262–263 further suggest El Mirador or El Mirador-cum-Nakbe may have been the place named Chatan Winik in the Late Classic Altar 3 of Altar de los Reyes, referring to the earliest of thirteen dynastic Lowland capitals deemed 'sacred seats of power.') (Note: Sharer & Traxler 2006, pp. 251–252, 254, 261 offer Caracol, Cerros, K'axob, Lamanai, Nohmul, Tikal, Uaxactun, and Wakna as further possible examples of Late Preclassic capitals. Sharer & Traxler 2006, p. 279 offers a rough hierarchy of some Late Preclassic states or capitals as follows: (i) El Mirador as the sole first-order capital; (ii) Lamanai, San Bartolo, Tikal, Uaxactun, and possibly Calakmul as second-order centres; (iii) Cerros as a third-order centre; and (iv) K'axob and Kichpanha as fourth-order ones.) These capitals' authority over their neighbouring settlements is thought to have been cemented, at least in part, by their increasing monopoly of long-distance trade in exotic goods (which noticeably expanded in reach and volume during this sub-period), and by their coercion, co-option, or provision of labour and resources for the construction of public infrastructure (which became noticeably monumental during this sub-period). (Note: Further additive factors in capitals' authority included, possibly, a monopoly over long-distance trade in some utilitarian goods, like obsidian blades (Sharer & Traxler 2006, p. 157). Sharer & Traxler 2006, pp. 158, 261, 278 give causeways, canals, plazas, temples, ballcourts, and Group E structures as hallmarks of capital-led public works, noting that the Late Preclassic saw the construction of 'the biggest masonry structures ever built by the Maya,' eg in El Mirador, Lamanai, and Tikal.)

Some or many of these multi-settlement polities are thought to have been ruled by sovereigns, including or especially divine kings, together with subordinate courts or privy councils, from their respective capitals. (Note: Sharer & Traxler 2006, p. 179 suggest that many Late Preclassic states 'were headed by a single ruler who monopolised available resources, wealth, and power, aided and abetted by elite subordinates who controlled most of the balance of resources.') Late Preclassic evidence of monarchical constitutions exists, at least, for states ruled by Cerros, El Mirador, Tikal, San Bartolo, and Uaxactun, while earlier Middle Preclassic evidence may exist, at least, for the state ruled by Nakbe. It has been further suggested that this monarchical 'tradition of rulership probably originated in the Middle Preclassic and is associated with the central Maya lowlands, as at Nakbe, and became fully developed in the Late Preclassic at El Mirador.' (Note: Sharer & Traxler 2006, pp. 273–276 distinguish Preclassic monarchy as seen in the Lowlands from that developed in the Highlands and Pacific, opining that these discreet traditions were not integrated until the beginning of the Classic Period.)

== Warfare ==
At least some warfare is thought to have attended the emergence of multi-settlement polities during the Middle Preclassic. The scarce available evidence from this sub-period 'points to sporadic, small-scale raiding between polities.' (Note: Evidence of such raids includes caches of projectile points, mass sacrificial graves, and inscribed depictions of rulers as warriors (Sharer & Traxler 2006, p. 183).) These sporadic attacks are thought to have become more widespread or intense towards the Late Preclassic, as surviving evidence of these later battles 'becomes far more certain.' (Note: Evidence of such intensified warfare includes carved or painted depictions of battles and captives, defensive fortifications, and hieroglyphic inscriptions of victories (Sharer & Traxler 2006, p. 185). For instance, two Late Preclassic sacrifical mass graves have been excavated at Cuello, and raid-like evidence of burning has been unearthed at Blackman Eddy, Cuello, and other Lowland settlements (Sharer & Traxler 2006, pp. 258–259).)

== Sites ==
Preclassic sites in Belize and surrounding Lowlands / very large Classic sites outside of Belize displayed / Uxmal+ = Uxmal, Tiho / Xunantunich+ = Xunantunich, Actun Halal, Actuncan / PN = Piedras Negras / via 2010 Witschey & Brown

The Preclassic is characterised by a move away from rockshelters to permanent settlements. Residential and ceremonial structures generally 'appear quite simple in design and construction.' Bedrock-embedded postholes, atop tamped floors or low earth-and-marl platforms, indicating apsidal pole-and-thatch houses, have been excavated in northern and central Belize. Fragments of pole-impressed daub walls, clay-lined hearths, low stone-retaining walls, and plastered architecture and platforms, demonstrating increasing investment in living and ceremonial spaces, and increasing social and ceremonial complexity, have also been unearthed. Public, ceremonial, or monumental structures in Cerros, Colha, Cuello, Lamanai, and Nohmul have been dated or tentatively dated to the Preclassic.

Prominent excavated sites in Belize with Preclassic artefacts, material, or structures. (Note: Not including various unnamed or minor Preclassic sites.)
Name	Location	Size
Actun Halal	Toledo	Small
Actuncan	Cayo	Small
Barton Ramie	Cayo	Small
Blackman Eddy	Cayo	Small
Cahal Pech	Cayo	Large
Caledonia	Corozal	Small
Cerros	Corozal	Small
Chechem Ha	Cayo	Small
Cob Swamp	Corozal	Small
Colha	Orange Walk	Small
Cuello	Orange Walk	Small
El Pozito	Orange Walk	Small
K'axob	Orange Walk	Small
Lamanai	Orange Walk	Large
Minanha	Cayo	Small
Nohmul	Orange Walk	Small
Pacbitun	Cayo	Large
San Antonio	Orange Walk	Small
San Estevan	Orange Walk	Small
Santa Rita	Corozal	Small
Xunantunich	Cayo	Large

== Timeline ==
Prominent Preclassic events in Belize or the Maya Lowlands.
Start	End	Unit	Event	Notes
2500	1500	BC	Earliest appearance of intensified agriculture	i.e. deforestation, erosion; cf
2200	1900	BC	Drought	cf
2200	1900	BC	Earliest appearance of Mayas	cf
2200	1000	cal BC	Earliest appearance of cotton textiles	cf
1200	1000	cal BC	Earliest appearance of ceramics	i.e. Cunil-style pottery; cf
1200	900	BC	Earliest appearance of non-nomadic settlements	i.e. agrarian hamlets; cf (Note: Dated circa 1000 BC by Sharer & Traxler 2006, p. 207.)
1000	1000	BC	Earliest appearance of intensified agriculture	i.e. canals, raised fields, terraces in farms; cf
1000	900	BC	Earliest appearance of obsidian tools	i.e. hard-hammer flakes; cf
900	900	BC	Earliest appearance of wealthy residential structures	e.g. graves; cf
600	600	BC	Earliest appearance of a pan-regional or global ceramic tradition	i.e. Mamon-style pottery; cf
600	400	BC	Earliest appearance of chiefdoms	possibly or hypothetically; cf
400	400	BC	Earliest appearance of public, ceremonial, monumental structures	i.e. open platform, involving human sacrifice, around ceremonial precinct in Cuello; cf (Note: Dated to during 1000–400 BC by Sharer & Traxler 2006, pp. 98, 203–206.)

== Scholarship ==
The earliest amateur work on Maya sites in Belize, possibly Preclassic ones, is attributed to George Henderson, a Bayman, who in 1809 published 'a tantalisingly short description of mounds along the Belize River.' Site-focussed excavations were begun by Thomas Gann in 1894, and presented to the Society of Antiquaries of London on 16 May 1895. However, 'the rudimentary beginnings of archaeological research were not followed by similar efforts in Belize for a good many years,' i.e. until 1925–1939 work by the British Museum, the Carnegie Institution, Field Museum, and J. E. S. Thompson, among others. (Note: It has been suggested that Gann's work prompted the first legislative protections for antiquities in colonial Belize in 1894, and their subsequent strengthening in 1897, 1924, and 1927.(Wallace 2011, p. 25, Hammond 1983, p. 22). His 1894–1936 career has been described as 'more destructive than protective of evidence from beginning to end' (Pendergast 1993, p. 4). However, it has also been pointed out that his work, if judged by archaeological standards of his time, rather than by modern ones, would not be so harshly judged–though it would still be found wanting (Wallace 2011, pp. 24–26).)

The earliest significant work on the Preclassic ceramics of Belize is thought to be the 1977 PhD thesis by Duncan Pring for the University of London. Ceramic data from Cuello, in particular, 'have played a significant role in our understanding of Early Middle Preclassic pottery in northern Belize.' Colha ceramics, additionally, have been identified as promising, given the site's Preceramic activity and possible occupation. (Note: However, the earlier Smith, Willey & Gifford 1960 study has been described as '[t]he major analytical advance in ceramic analysis [in Mesoamerican archaeology]' (Adams & Macleod 2000a, pp. 15–16), while the Joyce 1929 study was described as having discussed the ceramics of southern Belize to some depth (Braswell 2022, p. 87).)

== See also ==
- Pre-Columbian Belize
- Preclassic Period in the Maya Region of Mesoamerica
- Preclassic Period in Mesoamerica
- Formative stage in the Americas

== Notes and references ==
=== References ===
==== Journals ====
1. Akers, Pete D.; Brook, George A.; Railsback, L. Bruce; Liang, Fuyuan; Iannone, Gyles; Webster, James W.; Reeder, Philip P.; Cheng, Hai; Edwards, R. Lawrence (1 October 2016). "An extended and higher-resolution record of climate and land use from stalagmite MC01 from Macal Chasm, Belize, revealing connections between major dry events, overall climate variability, and Maya sociopolitical changes". Palaeogeography, Palaeoclimatology, Palaeoecology. 459: 268–288. Bibcode:2016PPP...459..268A. doi:10.1016/j.palaeo.2016.07.007.
2. Awe, Jaime J.; Ebert, Claire E.; Stemp, W. James; Brown, M. Kathryn; Sullivan, Lauren A.; Garber, James F. (2021). "Lowland Maya Genesis: The Late Archaic to Late Early Formative Transition in the Upper Belize River Valley". Ancient Mesoamerica. 32 (3): 519–544. doi:10.1017/S0956536121000420. S2CID 245125325.
3. Ebert, Julie A.; Rand, Asta J.; Green-Mink, Kirsten; Hoggarth, Julie A.; Freiwald, Carolyn; Awe, Jaime J.; Trask, Willa R.; Yaeger, Jason; Brown, M. Kathryn; Helmke, Christophe; Guerra, Rafael A.; Danforth, Marie; Kennett, Douglas J. (2021). "Sulfur isotopes as a proxy for human diet and mobility from the preclassic through colonial periods in the Eastern Maya lowlands". PLOS ONE. 16 (8): 1–37 of article no. e0254992. Bibcode:2021PLoSO..1654992E. doi:10.1371/journal.pone.0254992. PMC 8360522. PMID 34383771.
4. Fox, A. H. Lane (1871). "Thursday, March 2nd, 1871". Proceedings of the Society of Antiquaries of London. Second Series. 5 (2): 93–95. doi:10.1017/S0950797300011616. hdl:2027/hvd.hw2a3c.
5. Franks, A. W. (1877). "Remarks on Stone Implements from Honduras". Journal of the Anthropological Institute of Great Britain and Ireland. 6: 37–40. doi:10.2307/2841243. hdl:2027/hvd.32044042253526. JSTOR 2841243.
6. Gann, Thomas (1895). "On exploration of two mounds in British Honduras". Proceedings of the Society of Antiquaries of London. Second Series. 15: 430–434. hdl:2027/uiug.30112118719803.
7. Hammond, Norman (March 1983). "The development of Belizean archaeology". Antiquity. 57 (219): 19–27. doi:10.1017/S0003598X00054946. S2CID 163374681.
8. Hoggarth, Julie A.; Ebert, Claire E.; Castelazo-Calva, Victor E. (2021). "MesoRAD: A New Radiocarbon Data Set for Archaeological Research in Mesoamerica". Journal of Open Archaeology Data. 9 (10): 1–9. doi:10.5334/joad.83. S2CID 245401909.
9. Inomata, Takeshi; MacLellan, Jessica; Burham, Melissa (2015). "The Construction of Public and Domestic Spheres in the Preclassic Maya Lowlands". American Anthropologist. 117 (3): 519–534. doi:10.1111/aman.12285.
10. Inomata, Takeshi; Triadan, Daniela; Lopez, Veronica A. Vazquez; Fernandez-Diaz, Juan Carlos; Omori, Takayuki; Bauer, Maria Belen Mendez; Hernandez, Melina Garcia; Beach, Timothy; Cagnato, Clarissa; Aoyama, Kazuo; Nasu, Hiroo (25 June 2020). "Monumental architecture at Aguada Fenix and the rise of Maya civilization". Nature. 582 (7813): 530–533. Bibcode:2020Natur.582..530I. doi:10.1038/s41586-020-2343-4. PMID 32494009. S2CID 219281856.
11. Joyce, Thomas A. (1929). "Report on the British Museum Expedition to British Honduras, 1929". Journal of the Royal Anthropological Institute of Great Britain and Ireland. 59: 439–459. doi:10.2307/2843895. JSTOR 2843895.
12. Kennett, Douglas J.; Lipson, Mark; Prufer, Keith M.; Mora-Marin, David; George, Richard J.; Rohland, Nadin; Robinson, Mark; Trask, Willa R.; Edgar, Heather H. J.; Hill, Ethan C.; Ray, Erin E.; Lynch, Paige (22 March 2022). "South-to-north migration preceded the advent of intensive farming in the Maya region". Nature Communications. 13 (1): 1530. Bibcode:2022NatCo..13.1530K. doi:10.1038/s41467-022-29158-y. PMC 8940966. PMID 35318319.
13. Lesure, Richard G.; Sinensky, R. J.; Schachner, Gregson; Wake, Thomas A.; Bishop, Katelyn J. (2021). "Large-Scale Patterns in the Agricultural Demographic Transition of Mesoamerica and Southwestern North America". American Antiquity. 86 (3): 593–612. doi:10.1017/aaq.2021.23. S2CID 235538513.
14. Lohse, John C.; Awe, Jaime J.; Griffith, Cameron; Rosenswig, Robert M.; Valdez, Fred (2006). "Preceramic Occupations in Belize: Updating the Paleoindian and Archaic Record". Latin American Antiquity. 17 (2): 209–226. doi:10.2307/25063047. JSTOR 25063047. S2CID 163373104.
15. Metcalfe, Sarah E.; Holmes, Jonathan A.; Jones, Matthew D.; Gonzalez, Roger Medina; Primmer, Nicholas J.; Dyrzo, Haydar Martinez; Davies, Sarah J.; Leng, Melanie J. (15 April 2022). "Response of a low elevation carbonate lake in the Yucatan Peninsula (Mexico) to climatic and human forcings". Quaternary Science Reviews. 282: 1–17 of article no. 107445. Bibcode:2022QSRv..28207445M. doi:10.1016/j.quascirev.2022.107445. hdl:2160/60872eeb-b6f4-43ad-845f-e912dd25754a. S2CID 247514101.
16. Nielsen, Jasper; Andersen, Bente Jul (2004). "Collecting in Corozal : late Postclassic Maya Effigy Censers from Belize in the Danish National Museum (1860-1865)". Mayab (17): 84–98. ISSN 1130-6157.
17. Pearson, Georges A. (3 July 2017). "Bridging the Gap: An Updated Overview of Clovis across Middle America and its Techno-Cultural Relation with Fluted Point Assemblages from South America". PaleoAmerica. 3 (3): 203–230. doi:10.1080/20555563.2017.1328953. S2CID 135101506.
18. Pendergast, David M. (March 1993). "The Center and the Edge: Archaeology in Belize, 1809–1992". Journal of World Prehistory. 7 (1): 1–33. doi:10.1007/BF00978219. JSTOR 25800626. S2CID 161362847.
19. Pollock, A. L.; Beynen, P. E. van; DeLong, K. L.; Polyak, V.; Asmerom, Y.; Reeder, P. P. (1 December 2016). "A mid-Holocene paleoprecipitation record from Belize". Palaeogeography, Palaeoclimatology, Palaeoecology. 463: 103–111. Bibcode:2016PPP...463..103P. doi:10.1016/j.palaeo.2016.09.021.
20. Prufer, Keith M.; Alsgaard, Asia V.; Robinson, Mark; Meredith, Clayton R.; Culleton, Brendan J.; Dennehy, Timothy; Magee, Shelby; Huckell, Bruce B.; Stemp, W. James; Awe, Jaime J.; Capriles, Jose M.; Kennett, Douglas J. (18 July 2019). "Linking late paleoindian stone tool technologies and populations in North, Central and South America". PLOS ONE. 14 (7): 1–20 of article no. e0219812. Bibcode:2019PLoSO..1419812P. doi:10.1371/journal.pone.0219812. PMC 6638942. PMID 31318917.
21. Prufer, Keith M.; Robinson, Mark; Kennett, Douglas J. (2021). "Terminal Pleistocene Through Middle Holocene Occupations in Southeastern Mesoamerica: Linking Ecology and Culture in the Context of Neotropical Foragers and Early Farmers". Ancient Mesoamerica. 32 (3): 439–460. doi:10.1017/S0956536121000195. S2CID 245125309.
22. Rice, Prudence M. (24 March 2020). "In Search of Middle Preclassic Lowland Maya Ideologies". Journal of Archaeological Research. 29 (1): 1–46. doi:10.1007/s10814-020-09144-y. S2CID 216517189.
23. Schmitt, Dominik; Gischler, Eberhard; Anselmetti, Flavio S.; Vogel, Hendrik (2020). "Caribbean cyclone activity: an annually-resolved Common Era record". Scientific Reports. 10 (1): 1–17 of article no. 11780. Bibcode:2020NatSR..1011780S. doi:10.1038/s41598-020-68633-8. PMC 7367345. PMID 32678192.
24. Smith, Robert E.; Willey, Gordon R.; Gifford, James C. (January 1960). "The Type-Variety Concept as a Basis for the Analysis of Maya Pottery". American Antiquity. 25 (3): 330–340. doi:10.2307/277516. JSTOR 277516. S2CID 163806728.
25. Stemp, W. James; Awe, Jaime J.; Marcus, Joyce; Helmke, Christophe; Sullivan, Lauren A. (2021). "The Preceramic and Early Ceramic Periods in Belize and the Central Maya Lowlands". Ancient Mesoamerica. 32 (3): 416–438. doi:10.1017/S0956536121000444. S2CID 245125311.
26. Valdez, Fred; Sullivan, Lauren A; Buttles, Palma J; Aebersold, Luisa, Fred; Sullivan, Lauren A.; Buttles, Palma J.; Aebersold, Luisa (2021). "The Origins and Identification of the Early Maya from Colha and Northern Belize". Ancient Mesoamerica. 32 (3): 502–518. doi:10.1017/S0956536121000468. S2CID 245125274.
27. Wallace, Colin (May 2011). "Reconnecting Thomas Gann with British Interest in the Archaeology of Mesoamerica: An Aspect of the Development of Archaeology as a University Subject". Bulletin of the History of Archaeology. 21 (1): 23. doi:10.5334/bha.2113.

==== Theses ====
1. Awe, Jaime Jose (1992). Dawn in the land between the rivers : formative occupation at Cahal Pech, Belize and its implications for Preclassic development in the Maya lowlands (PhD). University College London.
2. Bermingham, Adam (2020). Land Use Strategies of the Ancient Maya in Seasonally Dry Tropical Forest Ecosystems of the Yucatan Peninsula (PhD). University of Northumbria.
3. Burns, Jeffrey M. (2018). Preceramic Cave Use in Belize (MA). Northern Arizona University. ProQuest 2050579408.
4. Duncan, Lindsay May (2019). Archaeological deposits, environmental impact and local soil formation at Marco Gonzalez, Belize (PhD). University College London.
5. Ebert, Claire Elizabeth Camilli (2017). Preclassic Maya Social Complexity and Origins of Inequality at Cahal Pech, Belize (PhD). Pennsylvania State University. ProQuest 2448339130.
6. Hoffmeister, Kristen Keir (2019). The Relationship between Sociopolitical Transitions and Mortuary Behavior among the Maya in Northern Belize (PhD). Texas A&M University. ISBN 9798438733836.
7. McLellan, Alec (2020). From Lamanai to Ka'kabish : human and environment interaction, settlement change, and urbanism in northern Belize (PhD). University College London.
8. Moore, Tamara (2021). Creation During Abandonment: Researching the Hingston Group at Ka'Kabish, Belize (MA). Trent University. ProQuest 2477999560.
9. Orsini, Stephanie R. (2016). From turkeys to tamales: Paleoindian to Preclassic period faunal use at Maya Hak Cab Pek rockshelter in southern Belize (MA). University of Mississippi. ProQuest 1809807534.
10. Plumer, Hannah (2017). Health among the Maya : comparisons across sites in the northern Three Rivers Region, Belize (PhD). University of Sheffield.
11. Pring, D. C. (1978). The Preclassic Ceramics of Northern Belize (PhD). University College London. EThOS ID uk.bl.ethos.469518.
12. Porter, Mark Lawrence Bennefield (2020). Caching Aggrandizers: Ritual Caching Practices, Competitive Generosity, and the Rise of Inequality in the Preclassic Maya Lowlands (MA). Northern Arizona University. ProQuest 2415270983.
13. Rawski, Zeo J. (2020). Constructing Power in the Preclassic: Monumental Architecture and Sociopolitical Inequality at Early Xunantunich, Belize (PhD). University of Texas. ProQuest 2415765388.
14. Rushton, Elizabeth A. C. (2014). 'Under the shade I flourish' : an environmental history of northern Belize over the last three thousand five hundred years (PhD). University of Nottingham.
15. Sparks-Stokes, Dominique (2019). The Impact of Ceramic Raw Materials on the Development of Hopewell and Preclassic Maya Pottery (PhD). University of Cincinnati. ProQuest 2272840805.

==== Print ====
1. Adams, Richard E. W.; Macleod, Murdo J., eds. (2000a). Mesoamerica, Part 1. The Cambridge history of the native peoples of the Americas. Vol. 2. Cambridge: Cambridge University Press. doi:10.1017/CHOL9780521351652. ISBN 9781139053778. S2CID 163512332.
2. Adams, Richard E. W.; Macleod, Murdo J., eds. (2000b). Mesoamerica, Part 2. The Cambridge history of the native peoples of the Americas. Vol. 2. Cambridge: Cambridge University Press. doi:10.1017/CHOL9780521652049. ISBN 9781139053464.
3. Braswell, Geoffrey E. (2022). Braswell, Geoffrey E. (ed.). 3,000 Years of War and Peace in the Maya Lowlands : Identity, Politics, and Violence. London: Routledge. doi:10.4324/9781351268004. ISBN 9781351268004. S2CID 246542762.
4. Henderson, George (1809). An account of the British settlement of Honduras; being a view of its commercial and agricultural resources, soil, climate, natural history, &c. London: Printed by and for C. and R. Baldwin, New Bridge-Street. hdl:2027/uc1.31175035187452.
5. Henderson, George (1811) [1809]. An account of the British settlement of Honduras; being a view of its commercial and agricultural resources, soil, climate, natural history, &c. London: Printed for R. Baldwin, Paternoster Row.
6. Lohse, Jon C.; Borejsza, Aleksander; Joyce, Arthur A., eds. (2021). Preceramic Mesoamerica. London: Routledge. doi:10.4324/9780429054679. ISBN 9780429054679. LCCN 2020053761. OCLC 1227789483. S2CID 242526375.
7. Love, Michael; Guernsey, Julia, eds. (2022). Early Mesoamerican cities : urbanism and urbanization in the Formative Period. Cambridge: Cambridge University Press. doi:10.1017/9781108975124. ISBN 9781108975124. S2CID 245455850.
8. Martin, Simon; Grube, Nikolai (2008) [2000]. Chronicle of the Maya kings and queens : deciphering the dynasties of the ancient Maya (2nd ed.). London & New York: Thames & Hudson. hdl:2027/uc1.32106019910212. ISBN 9780500287262. OCLC 47358325.
9. Pearsall, Deborah M., ed. (2008). Encyclopedia of Archaeology. San Diego, Calif.: Elsevier. OCLC 714030453.
10. Sharer, Robert J.; Traxler, Loa P., eds. (2006). The Ancient Maya (6th ed.). Stanford, Calif.: Stanford University Press. hdl:2027/mdp.39015062626216. ISBN 9780804748179. OCLC 57577446.
11. Tiesler, Vera (2022). Tiesler, Vera (ed.). The Routledge Handbook of Mesoamerican Bioarchaeology. London: Routledge. doi:10.4324/9780429341618. ISBN 9780429341618. S2CID 248676019.

==== Other ====
1. Witschey, Walter R. T.; Brown, Clifford T. (2010). The Electronic Atlas of Ancient Maya Sites (Map). [vars. scales]. Corvallis, Oreg.: Heidi Hausman & Conservation Biology Institute.
