= Ete I =

Bird Claw
- Ajaw

King of Tikal
- Reign: 6th century
- Predecessor: Lady of Tikal and Kaloomte' Bahlam
- Successor: Wak Chan K'awiil
- Religion: Maya religion

Bird Claw, (Note: The ruler's name, when transcribed is ?-TE'?, Martin & Grube 2008, p.38.) also known as Animal Skull I and Ete I (fl. 6th century), was an ajaw of the Maya city of Tikal. The monument associated with Bird Claw is Stelae 8. He carried a high-ranking name but no Tikal emblem.

== Footnotes ==
Regnal titles
Preceded by Lady of Tikal and Kaloomte' Bahlam	Ajaw of Tikal; 6th century	Succeeded by Wak Chan K'awiil
