= Wak Chan Kʼawiil =

- Ajaw

King of Tikal
- Reign: 27 December 537 – c. 562
- Predecessor: Bird Claw
- Successor: Animal Skull
- Born: January 508? Tikal
- Died: c. 562; Tikal
- Father: Chak Tok Ichʼaak II
- Mother: Lady Hand
- Religion: Maya religion

Wak Chan Kʼawiil, (Note: The ruler's name, when transcribed is WAK-CHAN KʼAWI꞉L YAX-E꞉B-XO꞉K?[KʼINICH AJAW]-wa, Martin & Grube 2008, p.39.) also known as Double Bird (January 508? – c. 562), was an ajaw of the Maya city of Tikal. He took the throne on December 27, 537(?) and reigning probably until his death. (Note: These are the dates indicated on the Maya inscriptions in Mesoamerican Long Count calendar, Accession: 9.5.3.9.15 12 Men 18 Kʼankʼin, Martin & Grube 2008, p.39.) He was son of Chak Tok Ichʼaak II and Lady Hand. He sponsored accession of Yajaw Teʼ Kʼinich II, ruler of Caracol in 553. The monument associated with Wak Chan Kʼawiil is Stelae 17.

== Biography ==
Wak Chan K'awiil was most likely born on January 508, with his parents being Chak Tok Ich'aak II who was the 18th Ajaw of Tikal and a woman named Lady Hand. His father died in June of 508, just 5 months after his birth. Double Bird would not rise to the throne and instead his sister(?); Lady of Tikal, and her husband; Kaloomteʼ Bahlam would rule until their deaths.

Double Bird would ascend to the throne on 27 December, 537 after possibly being in exile. The Stelae that states this states that he "arrived" in Tikal which means that he most likely came from exile as arrive in this context means "bringing great change". It appears he had a steady rule during this time with him commissioning a Stelae for his 20 year anniversary as Ajaw, also called a K'atun. This event came with the raising of Stelae 17 but little did anyone know it would be the last one to be raised for a century.

In 553 A.D. Wak Chan K'awiil would oversee the accession of the distant Caracol Ajaw, Yajaw Te K'inich II. In just 3 years however, relations would sour between the 2 kingdoms when Wak Chan K'awiil attacked Caracol first. It is stated that Wak Chan K'awiil would end up sacrificing an important individual from this attack although it remains unknown. This would cause Caracol to distance itself from Tikal as an ally and move closer to the Snake Kingdom and its Ajaw, Sky Witness.

In 562 A.D. Calakmul and allies attacked in a Star War which led to the end of Tikal's dominance in the Peten. The fate of Double Bird is unknown, but, based on typical attacks like these, he was most likely ritually sacrificed at the top of a pyramid.

== References and Footnotes ==
Regnal titles
Preceded by Ete I	Ajaw of Tikal; December 27, 537?-c. 562	Succeeded by Animal Skull
