= Jasaw Chan K'awiil =

Jasaw Chan K'awiil is the modern deciphered transliteration of a personal name glyph appearing in pre-Columbian Maya inscriptions. It may refer to:

- Jasaw Chan Kʼawiil I (reigned 682–734 CE), ruler of Maya city-state, Tikal; 26th in dynastic line from founder, brought resurgence in Tikal's political fortunes
- Jasaw Chan Kʼawiil II (fl. 869 CE), last-known ruler of the Maya city-state of Tikal, identifiable from extant inscriptions
