= 23rd Ruler =

Ajaw of the Maya city of Tikal c. 635

- Ajaw of Tikal
- Reign: c. 635
- Predecessor: K'inich Waaw
- Successor: 24th Ruler
- Religion: Maya religion

23rd Ruler was an ajaw of the Maya city of Tikal. He ruled around the year 635. Information about this ajaw and his successor 24th Ruler are scarce. K'inich Muwaan Jol II is estimated to have been 23rd or 24th Ruler because he may have been the father of the 25th ajaw, Nuun Ujol Chaak.

== Footnotes ==
Regnal titles
Preceded by Animal Skull	Ajaw of Tikal c. 635	Succeeded by 24th Ruler
