= K'inich Waaw =

Animal Skull
- Ajaw of Tikal; 22nd in the line
- Animal Skull's glyph.
- Reign: after 562-c.593
- Predecessor: Wak Chan K'awiil
- Successor: 23rd Ruler
- Born: before 562
- Died: c.593
- Burial: Temple 32 (Burial 195)
- Father: Fire Cross
- Mother: Lady Hand Sky of Bahlam
- Religion: Maya religion

Animal Skull, (Note: The ruler's name, when transcribed is K'INICH-?[TE'?], translated "Radiant ?", Martin & Grube 2008, p.40.) also known as Lizard Head, Animal Skull II and Ete II (before 562 – c. 593), was an ajaw of the Maya city of Tikal. He took the throne after 562, reigning until c. 593. He was a son of Fire Cross and Lady Hand Sky of Bahlam.

== Biography ==
K'inich Waaw ruled during what's known as the Tikal Hiatus where no stelae have been found (or possibly created) due to attacks from neighboring cities. Very little is known about his early life except that he most likely is an outsider of Tikal, maybe even a usurper.

Him being foreign to Tikal comes from the fact that he lacks the Kaloomte' (Tikal Lord Title) title in his name. Furthermore, what artifacts that do mention him that exists usually references his mother. This is often interpreted as his matrilineal background being grounds for his legitimacy.

== References and Footnotes ==
Regnal titles
| Preceded by Wak Chan K'awiil | Ajaw of Tikal after 562-c.593 | Succeeded by 23rd Ruler |
