= Chak Tok Ichʼaak I =

Ajaw of the Maya city of Tikal

- Ajaw
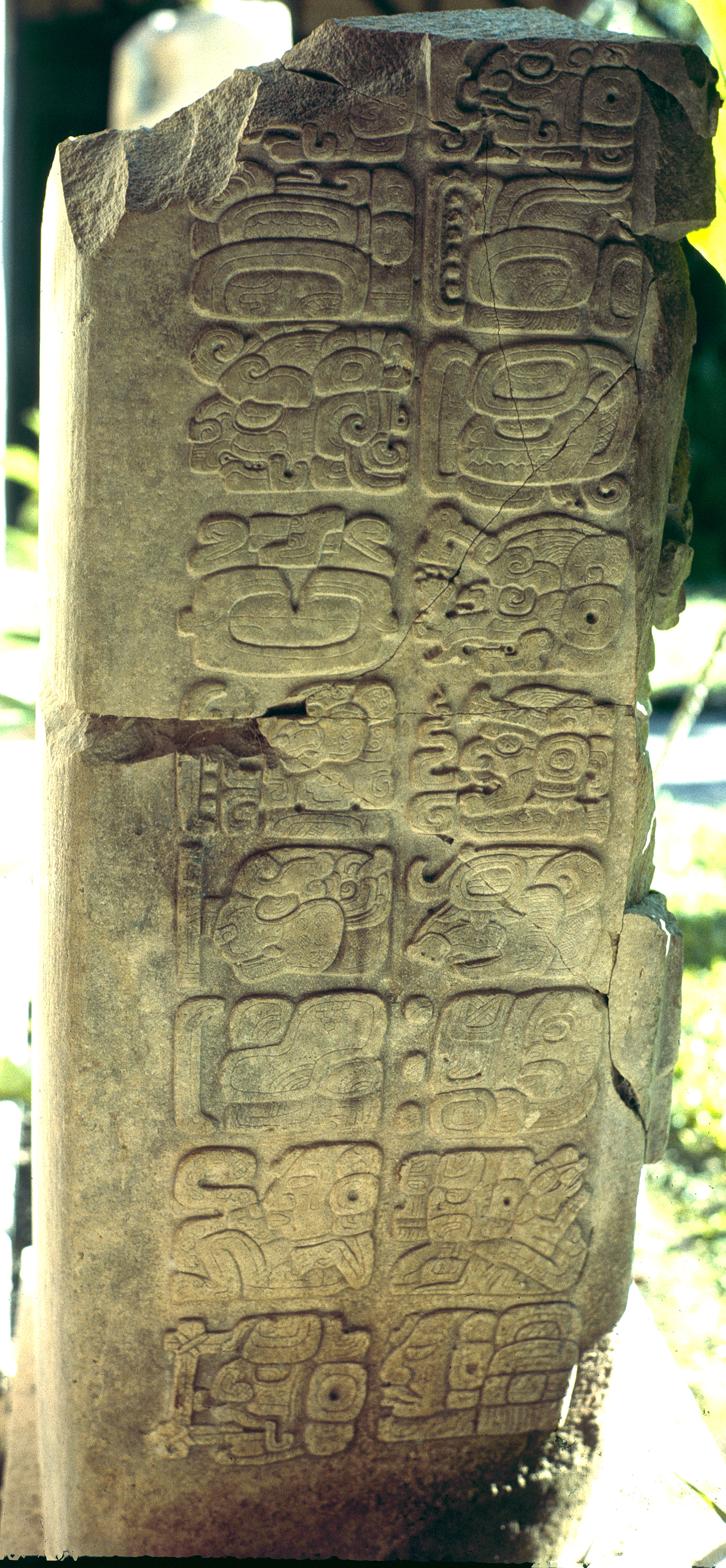
- Stela 26 at Tikal bears the name Chak Tok Ichʼaak, although it is unclear if it is referring to Chak Tok Ichʼaak I or Chak Tok Ichʼaak II.

King of Tikal
- Reign: 7 August 360 - 14 January 378
- Predecessor: Kʼinich Muwaan Jol I
- Successor: Yax Nuun Ahiin I
- Died: 14 January 378; Tikal
- Father: Kʼinich Muwaan Jol
- Mother: Lady Bahlam Way
- Religion: Maya religion

Chak Tok Ichʼaak I (Note: The ruler's name, when transcribed, is CHAK-TOK-ICHʼA꞉K, translated "Great Misty? Claw", Martin & Grube 2008, p.28.) also known as Great Paw, Great Jaguar Paw, and Toh Chak Ichʼak (died 14 January 378) was an ajaw of the Maya city of Tikal. He took the throne on 7 August 360 and reigned until his death in 378, apparently at the hands of invaders from central Mexico. (Note: These are the dates indicated on the Maya inscriptions in Mesoamerican Long Count calendar, Accession: 8.16.3.10.2 11 Ikʼ 10 Sek and Death: 8.17.1.4.12 11 Eb 15 Mak, Martin & Grube 2008, p.28.)

Born to Kʼinich Muwaan Jol and Lady Bahlam Way, Chak Tok Ichʼaak I is one of Tikal's best known kings. His name is recorded on a number of ceramic pieces and stelae. Stela 39, which was discovered by archaeologists in the Mundo Perdido complex, was produced to commemorate the Kʼatun ending in 376. It depicts the king standing upon a bound captive while holding an ax decorated with jaguar markings that was probably used as either a weapon or an instrument of sacrifice.

His name also appears on the fragmentary Stela 26 from Tikal's North Acropolis, which he may have dedicated. Both stelae were deliberately smashed soon after being dedicated. Another stela from the distant site of El Temblor may have been created to mark his accession to power, but it is possible that it may instead have been dedicated to a namesake.

His palace was located in the Central Acropolis and was identified from a carved clay vessel which had been interred under the western staircase as part of a dedication ritual. Unusually, it was never built over by later rulers, and was kept in repair for centuries as an apparently revered monument.

Stela 31 from Tikal records that Chak Tok Ichʼaak I died on the same day that Siyaj Kʼakʼ, probably a war-leader from Teotihuacan, entered Tikal. The arrival of Siyaj Kʼakʼ probably represented a forcible takeover, perhaps a conquest, which resulted in the death of Chak Tok Ichʼaak I. The dead ruler's entire lineage was overthrown and a new line of rulers took power in their place, starting with Yax Nuun Ahiin I.

== Death ==
On January 14, 378, Chak Tok Ichʼaak I could have been killed by an army invading from Teotihuacan.

== Footnotes ==
Regnal titles
Preceded by Kʼinich Muwaan Jol	Ajaw of Tikal; 360?-378	Succeeded by Yax Nuun Ahiin I
