= Kʼaxob =

Archaeological site in Belize

- Periods: 800BC to 900AD
- Cultures: Maya
- Location: Orange Walk or San Pablo, Belize

History
- Built: Late Preclassic period
- Abandoned: Early Postclassic Period

Site notes
- Architectural styles: Preclassic and Classic Number of temples: 5
- Excavation dates: 1979 and 1981 and again in 1990-1998
- Archaeologists: Patricia A. McAnany, B. L. Turner, Peter D. Harrison, Angela Lockard, Kimberly Berry and Aizpurúa

Kʼaxob is an archaeological site of the Maya civilization located in Belize. It was occupied from about 800 B.C. to A.D. 900. The site is located in northern Belize in the wetlands of Pulltrouser Swamp in proximity to the Sibun River Valley in central Belize. Research has shown that Kʼaxob was occupied from the Late Preclassic Period to the Early Postclassic Period. This period in time and the site is characterized by specific ceramic types as well as agriculture and an increase in social stratification. Kʼaxob is a village site centered on two pyramid plazas and later grew in size during the Early Classic Period to the Late Classic Period. The site includes a number of household, mounds and plazas. Kʼaxob is mostly based on residential and household living but also has some ritualistic aspects.

Many of the structures at the site show evidence of household dwellings as well as ritual purposes. There are many burials at the site that illustrate the ritualistic aspects and social stratification at Kʼaxob. Many of the individuals, some more than others, were interned with beads made of shell as well as ceramic vessels, demonstrating this potential social stratification. The pottery vessels recovered from the site demonstrates regularity in the production of pottery. The most prominent type of ceramic vessels recovered from the site were 'serving bowls', with a tripodal base, and were present during the Early Classic Period. There is also evidence of specialized areas for pottery production. There are middens at the site that yielded a great deal of pottery sherds and are associated with structures that are believed to be kilns as well as with tools similar to modern pottery making tools. There is also some evidence of stone tool production at the site. The most common stone tool recovered from the site is a chert oval biface and is associated with agriculture and thought to have been used for weeding and hoeing.

== Past and Current Archaeological Research at Kʼaxob ==
Kʼaxob was first excavated in 1979 and 1981 by B. L. Turner and Peter D. Harrison. The excavations were then taken over by Patricia A. McAnany in 1981, who is currently a professor at The University of North Carolina at Chapel Hill. The bulk of the research at the site was conducted from 1990 to 1998 and focused on social stratification, household structures and agriculture at Kʼaxob. Research at the site is ongoing through Boston University and is funded by The National Science Foundation. Patricia A. McAnany continues to the primary investigator, with aid from graduate and undergraduate students and in collaboration with other universities and the Belize government. Analysis is conducted both at the field lab at the site in Belize as well as at central lab at Boston University.

== Architecture ==
Household and pyramidal architecture at Kʼaxob went through multiple phases in response to increasing population and social complexity throughout the Preclassic and Classic periods. Most household complexes at Kʼaxob were constructed on top of raised mounds or platforms; over 100 of these residential platforms exist at the site. Some of the residential households were arranged in clusters of two or more structures surrounding a central patio area on basal platform mounds, while single mounds consisted of one residential structure. Larger corporate households were occupied by 20-30 people, while smaller households held around 8 people Differentiation between house sizes are an indication of a complex, stratified society. Structures were typically thatched with vegetation and made out of a plaster-like substance, using sascab as a fill for structural support, and flooring was generally composed of packed marl. The main residential settlements, known as northern plaza A and southern plaza B, were situated around two central pyramid complexes.

Northern Plaza A: The central pyramid located in the northern area of northern plaza A was constructed in the Late Classic period and was continuously maintained until its last phase of construction, which occurred in the Terminal Classic period. Standing at 13 meters tall, this pyramid has since been heavily eroded and overgrown by vegetation.

Southern Plaza B: The second settlement area, plaza B, is located 300 meters south of plaza A and consists of four pyramidal structures in a ring formation, creating the central patio area within the complex. The largest pyramid in this complex, the Classic Period construction known as Structure 18, stands 4 meters above the plaza floor. Several more "satellite" platforms, accommodating single and multiple dwellings, surround the outer region of the two main plazas.

Shifts in Architecture: Excavated stratigraphic layers of some plaza B platforms show that structures built in the Classic period were built on top of the remains of Late Preclassic structures, indicating that phases in construction took place over extended periods of time. Evidence for the earliest settlement of Kʼaxob is present in the deepest excavated layer of the central basal platform at plaza B. The remains of these early structures date back to between 800 and 400 BC. By around 250 BC, the village transformed substantially and buildings were frequently renovated, likely due to population growth. Settlements began expanding from the core of plaza B to the outer regions where the satellite dwellings were constructed. At 200 to 50 BC, building techniques transformed from oval dwellings built at ground level to rectangular buildings built on top of platforms, and singular dwellings were developed into multiple complexes within the plaza.

By the Terminal Preclassic, between 50 BC and AD 250, previous architectural techniques were replaced by pyramidal structures which made up the focal points of the two main plazas, and residential compounds remained the featured architectural style throughout the Classic period up to AD 900. Building Function: Evidence that suggests specific functional purposes for buildings is exemplified in some lightweight structures containing charcoal lined pits and middens, which were most likely used as kitchen areas. This type of building pattern, where lightweight structures were used for cooking and more extensive buildings were used as a household structure or an area for social events, is commonly found throughout contemporary Mesoamerican societies as well. Several burials have also been found underneath the floors of these complexes, which appears to be another common practice of this society The pyramidal structures likely acted as monuments in which ritualistic activities and ancestor worship took place.

== Major Features in Kʼaxob ==
The tallest pyramid in Kʼaxob reaches to a height of 13 metres. It is located at the north end of northern Plaza A. The final phase of construction of this pyramid took place during the Terminal Classic Period. On the southern side of the plaza, there is a staircase constructed along the front of the pyramid. This was constructed during the Late Classic Period.

Other Features Found

A structure that was built on the west side of pyramidal structure 1 during the Terminal Classic Period was discovered during an excavation by Angela Lockard. A poorly preserved small raised platform was found here. This platform could have been used for ritual performances or oration. An excavation done by Kimberly Berry revealed the remains of a pottery kiln beneath a small rise at the north end of the site. This is one of the few pottery kilns excavated in the Maya lowlands.

== Agriculture ==
Farming Techniques: The inhabitants of Kʼaxob employed a farming technique called milpa, which involved the cutting and burning of high vegetation to clear forests and plant staple crops, usually maize, beans, and squash. The cleared fields would then become rich in nutrients from the resulting ash for better crop production. Milpa farming is a type of crop rotation where crops can be grown in that field for a few seasons, and then must remain fallow for several years to conserve nutrients in the soil. This type of subsistence agriculture would have been sustainable for small populations, but as the village began expanding, other farming techniques would have been necessary as well. Fields were maintained through hoeing and weeding, and the construction of canals and raised fields aided in irrigation.

Diet: Radiocarbon bone analyses of individuals found in excavated burial pits revealed that the inhabitants of Kʼaxob relied on a diet of crops such as maize, beans, and squash as well as tropical fruits and nuts. It is evident that they also likely ate dog, peccary, and deer as a source of protein. The New River and surrounding wetland environment provided various freshwater resources such as turtle, fish, and species of mollusk. Also present at the site are macrobotanical remains of avocado and cacao trees. Botanical remains found within various households throughout the site indicate that people living in larger corporate households had access to a wider variety of foods in comparison to smaller households, suggesting evidence for social stratification.

== Burials ==
There were one-hundred and three individuals recovered from the site of Kʼaxob and seventy-two burials. The individuals recovered are male and female, of all ages, infant to adult. Excavations yielded beads, pendants, including zoomorphic pendants as well as ceramics and unworked shells interred with the individuals. Some of the burials held multiple individuals, while others were only single-person burials. The individuals are also interred in different positions, 'sitting' or 'flexed'. Many of the burials are beneath household structures. The burials at Kʼaxob date from the Middle Preclassic Period through to the Terminal Classic Period. The amount of beads, pendants or ceramics as well as the number of individuals and the position of an individual in a burial could suggest ritual practices as well as possible social stratification at Kʼaxob.

Burial 2: Young adult male from the Terminal Classic Period, interred with worked shell and beads.

Burial 3: Adult burial, yielding pendants made from gastropod and bivalve shells, as well as beads with a uniform and regular shape, buried during the Late Formative.

Burial 5: Adult male burial, yielding jade beads as well as an obsidian blade.

Burial 7: Adult burial, yielding pendants made from gastropod and bivalve shells, as well as beads with a uniform and regular shape, from the late period

Burial 10: Adult male, from the Early Classic Period, interred with multiple ceramics.

Burial 12: Young adult, from the Late Classic Period, yielding beads as well as zoomorphic pendants.

Burial 13: Adult burial, from the Late Classic Period, interred with beads placed in a 'carpet' beneath the individual.

Burial 18: Infant female burial, from the Early Classic Period, buried with Burial 19.

Burial 19: Adult, female burial, from the Early Classic Period yielding irregularly shaped beads that were placed in a 'carpet' beneath the individual. As well as ceramic vessels such as the Sierra Red Dish, this was characteristic of the time.

Burial 23, 32 and 39: Individuals of undetermined sex, buried together, from the Late Preclassic Period, and interred with unfinished beads placed in a 'carpet' beneath the individuals.

Burial 28: Adult burial, yielding irregularly shaped beads, and dates to the Middle Formative Period.

Burial 30 A: Adult burial, yielding irregularly shaped beads and dates to the Middle Formative Period.

Burial 35: Adult Burial, yielding irregularly shaped beads.

Burial 41: Adult burial, interred with zoomorphic pendants.

Burial 43: Adult male illustrating the cultural practice at Kʼaxob of shells for ritual use; approximately 2,019 marine-shell beads were recovered from burial 43 in association with this individual. Burial 43 yielded the largest number of beads recovered from a single burial, most of which were regularly shaped and uniform, implying that the individual was of higher status. The burial dates to the Middle Preclassic Period.

== Human Modification of Beads at Kʼaxob ==
Most beads (81%) were crafted from marine shell, Strombus sp There were different kinds of beads also made from marine shell that are present in the Kʼaxob site such as disks, pendants, figurines/blanks, 'tinklers' and 'others' Aizpurúa and McAnany (1999) Research has shown that there is a greater presence of beads during the Middle Formative and the Late Formative The beads from Kʼaxob were retrieved primarily from burials as well as from shell middens, and some were retrieved from features such as households. The shell remains that were recovered are predominantly from Caribbean resources, such as Strombus sp suggesting trade with the coast.

== Ceramics ==
The middle Formative ceramics in Kʼaxob seem to be a combination of local lowland developments and external influences. They had links to El Salvador, the Gulf of Mexico and the Pacific Coast. During this time, the external influences had a stronger influence on the ceramic tradition rather than the local ceramic materials.

During the Late Middle Formative period, the ceramics that were created are identified by the Mamom ceramic sphere. The Late Formative period is identified as the Chicanel ceramic sphere. During the Formative period, Maya potteries were mostly red- slipped monochrome wares or unslipped smoothed vessel or rough surfaced vessels. Vessel painting did not occur until the Classical period. In the Middle Formative period, some of the slipped vessels were decorated with resist pattern. This type of decoration is not seen in the Late Formative period.

In the Late Formative period, ceramics and the surface treatment becomes more homogenous. During this period, the Sierra Red types of vessels are predominate vessel types. Most of the ceramics continued to be unslipped which makes it difficult to distinguish it from previous periods.

== Cross motif in potteries ==
A particular design that appears on Kʼaxob potteries is the cross motif. This motif occurs only in the Kʼaxob vessels. They have not been seen in any other Late Formative period villages. This motif is important in pan-Mesoamerican symbols because it is associated with agricultural fields, the calendar, cardinal directions and seasonality. The central point of the quadripartite had various meaning to it. For the inhabitants of Kʼaxob it indicated a central focus point because it was the central place for its inhabitants.
