= Kʼinich Muwaan Jol =

- Ajaw of Tikal; 13th in the line
- Kʼinich Muwaan Jol's glyph
- Reign: ?-359
- Predecessor: Unen Bahlam
- Successor: Chak Tok Ichʼaak I
- Died: May 23, 359?
- Issue: Chak Tok Ichʼaak I
- Religion: Maya religion

Kʼinich Muwaan Jol, (Note: The ruler's name, when transcribed is KʼINICH-[MUWAN]JOL, translated "Radiant Hawk Skull", Martin & Grube 2008, p.27.) (died 359) was ajaw of the Maya city-state of Tikal. He was father of Chak Tok Ichʼaak I and he ruled until 359. (Note: These are the dates indicated on the Maya inscriptions in Mesoamerican Long Count calendar, Death: 8.16.2.6.0 11 Ajaw 13 Pop, Martin & Grube 2008, p.27)

== Biography and sources ==
The last named ruler of Tikal preceding K'inich Muwaan Jol was Une' B'alam, a female ruler who took power by 317 AD, possibly due to a breakdown of the royal dynasty's male line. A Tikal ruler depicted with a trophy head and captive is then recorded on a jade celt known as the Leiden Plaque to acceded to the throne in 320.

Muwaan Jol's reign was part of a period of political stability and architectural growth at Tikal in the 4th century. The first version of a platform in the Mundo Perdido complex, labelled 3D-43-1 by archaeologists, was probably built c. 350, possibly during Muwaan Jol's reign. Muwaan Jol is named on Tikal Stela 39 as the father of Chak Tok Ich'aak I, who succeeded him as ajaw. A later stela of Chak Tok Ich'aak I depicts Muwaan Jol alongside other ancestral lords and himself. His death, likely in 359, is recorded on a stela at Corozal.

== Footnotes ==
Regnal titles
Preceded by Unen Bahlam	Ajaw of Tikal ?-359	Succeeded by Chak Tok Ichʼaak I
