= Sihyaj Chan Kʼawiil I =

Ajaw of the Maya city of Tikal

- Ajaw of Tikal; 11th in the line
- Sihyaj Chan Kʼawiil I's glyph
- Reign: c.307
- Predecessor: Animal Headdress
- Successor: Unen Bahlam
- Father: Animal Headdress
- Mother: Lady Skull
- Religion: Maya religion

Sihyaj Chan Kʼawiil I, (Note: The ruler's name, when transcribed is SIHYAJCHAN[KʼAWI꞉L] CHAK-ICHʼA꞉K, translated "Sky-born Kʼawil Great Claw", Martin & Grube 2008, p.26.) (fl. c. 307) was ajaw ("lord") of the Maya city-state of Tikal. He was son of his predecessor Animal Headdress and Lady Skull. The monument associated with Sihyaj Chan Kʼawiil I is El Encanto Stela I.

== Footnotes ==
Regnal titles
Preceded by Animal Headdress	Ajaw of Tikal c.307	Succeeded by Unen Bahlam
