= Jewel Kʼawiil =

- Ajaw

King of Tikal
- Reign: c.849
- Predecessor: Dark Sun
- Successor: Jasaw Chan Kʼawiil II
- Died: Tikal
- Religion: Maya religion

Jewel Kʼawiil (Note: The ruler's name, when transcribed is ?-KʼAWI꞉L-li, Martin & Grube 2008, p.52.) (fl. 849), was an ajaw of the Maya city of Tikal. He ruled c.849.

== Footnotes ==
Regnal titles
Preceded by Dark Sun	Ajaw of Tikal c.849	Succeeded by Jasaw Chan Kʼawiil II
