= 24th Ruler =

Ajaw of the Maya city of Tikal c. 645

- Ajaw of Tikal
- Reign: c.645
- Predecessor: 23rd Ruler
- Successor: Nuun Ujol Chaak
- Religion: Maya religion

24th Ruler was an ajaw of the Maya city of Tikal. He ruled around the year 645. Information about this ajaw and his predecessor 23rd Ruler are scarce. K'inich Muwaan Jol II is considered to be the best candidate for the 23rd or 24th Ruler as he might have been the father of 25th ajaw Nuun Ujol Chaak.

== Footnotes ==
Regnal titles
| Preceded by 23rd Ruler | Ajaw of Tikal c.645 | Succeeded by Nuun Ujol Chaak |
