= Unen Bahlam =

- Queen of Tikal
- Unen Bahlam's glyph
- Reign: c.317
- Predecessor: Sihyaj Chan K'awiil I
- Successor: K'inich Muwaan Jol
- Religion: Maya religion

Unen Bahlam (Note: The ruler's name, when transcribed is UNEN[BAHLAM], translated "Baby Jaguar", Martin & Grube 2008, p.27.) (fl. c. 317) was a queen regnant of the Maya city-state of Tikal. Although generally assumed to be female, the sex of this ruler has been contested and is not fully confirmed.

== Footnotes ==
Regnal titles
Preceded by Sihyaj Chan K'awiil I	Queen of Tikal c.317	Succeeded by K'inich Muwaan Jol
