= Yax Ehb Xook =

- Yax Ehb Xook's glyph

Ajaw of Tikal
- Reign: c. 90 AD
- Predecessor: City-state established
- Successor: Foliated Jaguar
- Religion: Maya religion

Yax Ehb Xook, (Note: The ruler's name, when transcribed is YAX-E:B -XO:K?, translated "First Step Shark?", Martin & Grube 2008, p.26.) also known as Yax Moch Xok and Yax Chakte'I Xok, (fl. c. 90) was the dynastic founder and ajaw of the Maya city-state of Tikal. He ruled c. 90 AD.

Previous estimates had placed the founder at AD 170-235 or AD 219–238. But these ranges had been derived by placing the death of the ninth ruler Chak Tok Ich'aak I who died in AD 378. In fact, Chak Tok Ich'aak I, was Tikal's fourteenth ruler and not its ninth. This earlier foundation date only reinforces Tikal's pivotal role in the genesis of Classic civilization in the Maya Lowlands, synchronizing it with developments in the Highlands and Pacific Coast that have traditionally been designated Late Preclassic but bear most of the hallmarks of Early Classic civilization.

== Biography ==
There are no monuments or records of Ehb Xook's reign, which is solely documented through archaeological evidence, and through acknowledgements made by his successors.

Ehb Xook's name appears on a jade earflare excavated at Kaminaljuyu, suggesting it may have been his place of origin, from which he came to Tikal. Despite being recognized by later rulers of Tikal as its founder, earlier tombs in the city's North Acropolis suggest that he did not found the city. Hence, it is possible that Ehb Xook gained his status as Tikal's founder due to his reign and actions.

== Footnotes ==
Regnal titles
Preceded by New creation	Ajaw of Tikal c.90	Succeeded by Foliated Jaguar
