= Central Acropolis =

Coordinates: 17.221454°N 89.623331°W

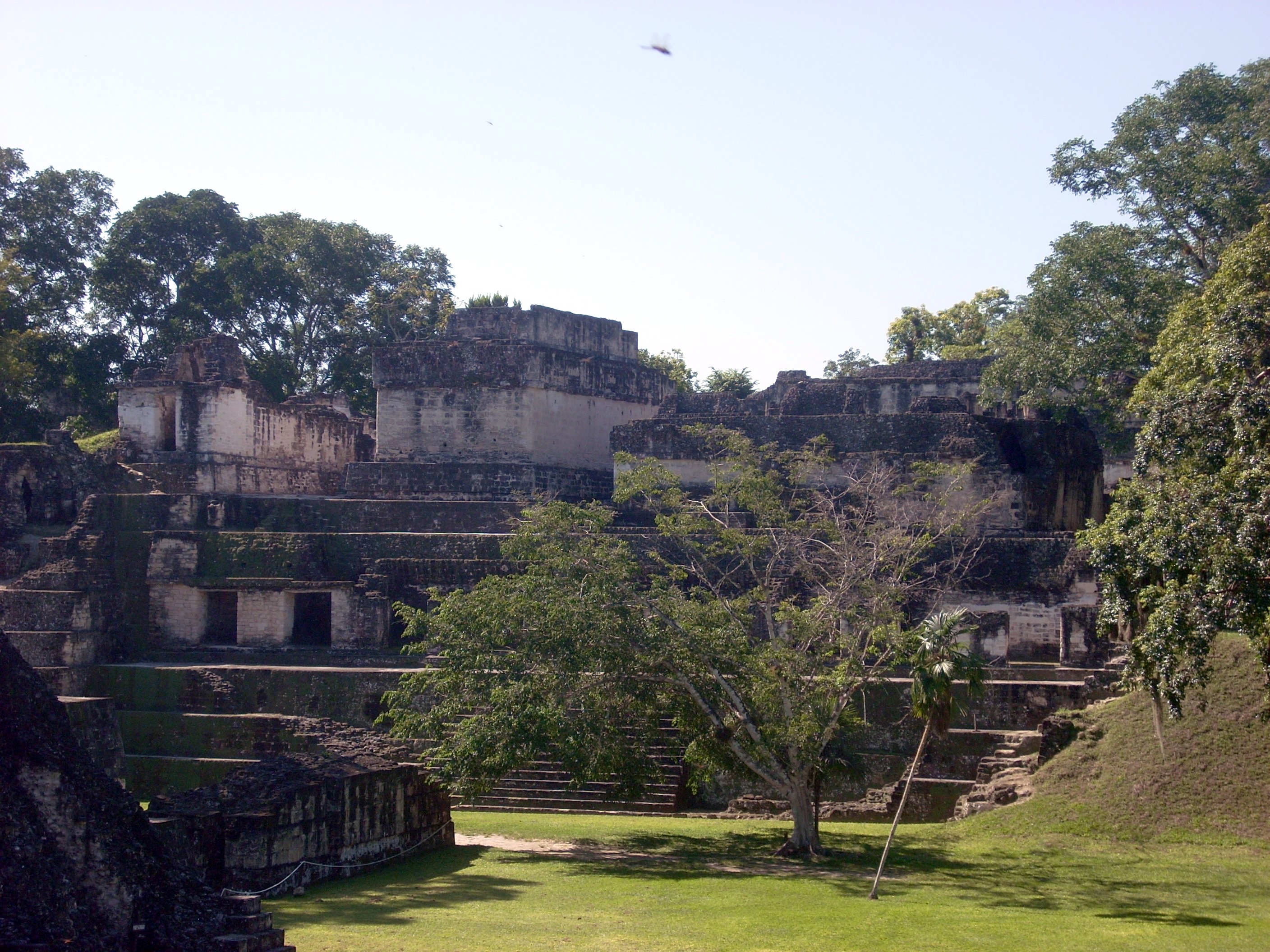
The Central Acropolis seen across the Great Plaza

The Central Acropolis of the ancient Maya city of Tikal is an architectural complex located immediately to the south of the Great Plaza. Tikal is one of the most important archaeological sites of the pre-Columbian Maya civilization and is located in the Petén Department of northern Guatemala. The complex served dual administrative and residential purposes. The Central Acropolis was first established in the Late Preclassic period (c. 350 BC – 250 AD) of Mesoamerican chronology, and it remained in use until approximately 950 AD.

The Central Acropolis housed Tikal royal families. From its earliest period of use, the eastern portion of what later became the Central Acropolis was used as a royal residence, and by the Early Classic period (c. 250 – 550 AD) it was the location of an important residential palace complex. The inhabitants of Tikal levelled out the natural bedrock underlying the Central Acropolis at 253 metres (830 ft) above mean sea level, a few meters above the level of the Great Plaza. The bedrock drops off steeply to the east and south of the acropolis.

== History ==
The earliest known activity in the complex dates to the period from 350 BC to 1 AD. The first structures consisted of masonry platforms with perishable superstructures, evidenced by postholes. None of these early structures have been completely excavated, with glimpses of them being given by tunnelling into the acropolis. These early remains have been discovered in various locations beneath later structures, suggesting that the entire area of the Central Acropolis extends back to the earliest period of activity. The early structures on the southern boundary of the acropolis were much lower than later structures, and were probably built directly upon the bedrock of the ridge. As the acropolis developed, these were overlain by later architecture but the area covered by the complex remained within the early-established boundaries. Between 250 and 550 AD, masonry began to be employed in building palace structures.

=== Modern history ===
A description of the complex was published by Teoberto Maler in 1911. Maler described the Central Acropolis as a labyrinthine multi-storey complex with several preserved wooden lintels, one of which was sculpted. The first excavations of the acropolis were undertaken in 1962 under the direction of Peter Harrison, and seasonal excavations continued until 1967; the project completely excavated 25 structures. When the acropolis was mapped in the 1960s, some structures were large mounds overgrown by forest; excavation revealed them to be complex structures with numerous rooms. As of 2003, the Central Acropolis had still not been completely excavated.

== Description ==
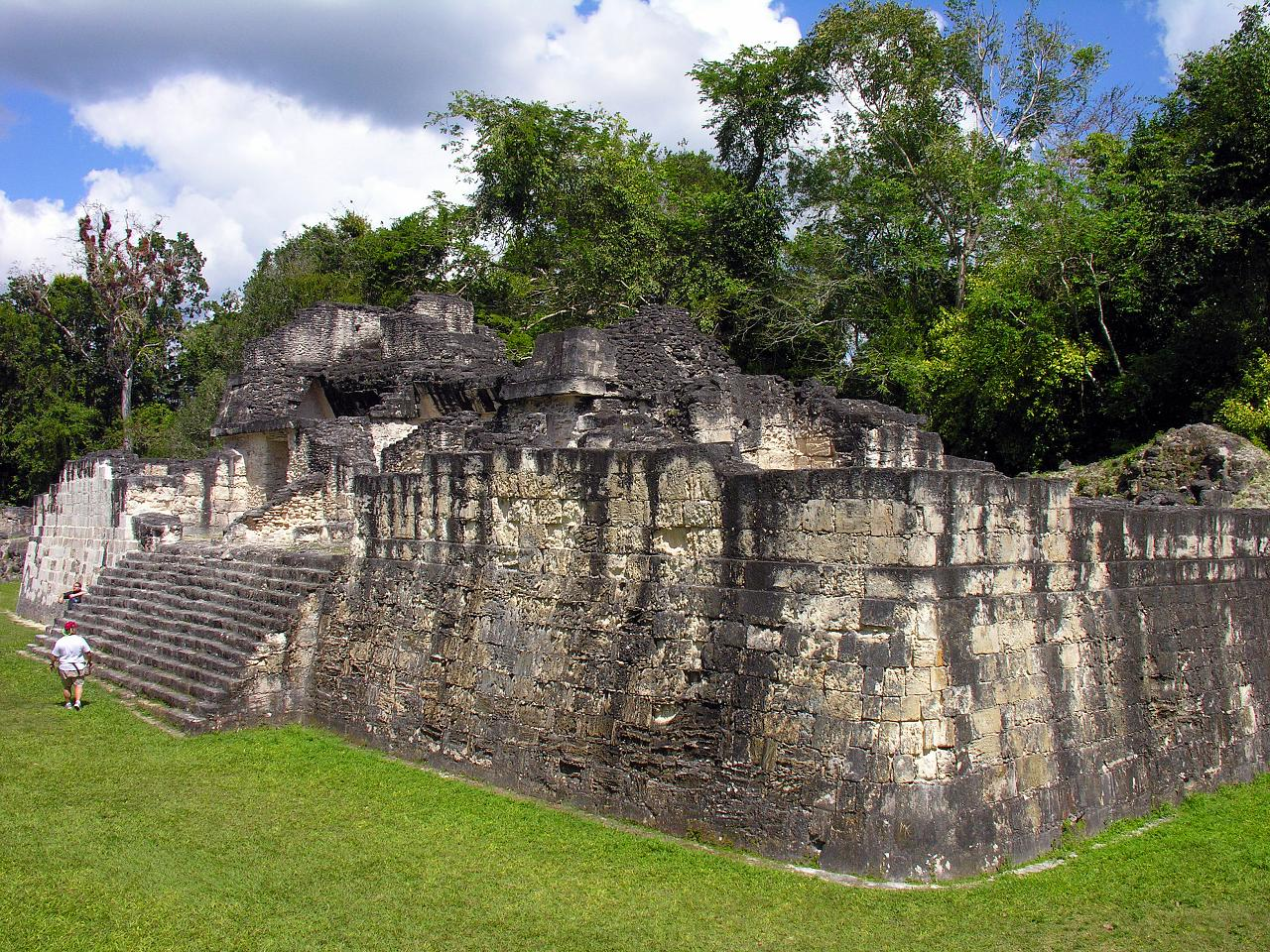
Structure 5D-46 was a residence of king Chak Tok Ich'aak

The Central Acropolis is oriented east-west, and this orientation was established very early in its history. The acropolis continued to develop over a period of more than five hundred years. As the complex developed over time, it expanded upwards with the superposition of new architecture, rather than outwards to cover a greater area. The palace structures in the acropolis are arranged around a series of six courtyards, each at a different level.

The complex includes 43 structures. Excavations uncovered few burials within the Central Acropolis, but four were discovered underneath a single structure (5D-46). In general at lowland Maya sites, burials were common under family residences; the lack of burials under most structures in the Central Acropolis indicates that most were not permanently occupied residential structures. Those complex structures in the acropolis that did not have burials were likely to have been temporary residences serving such functions as housing for the priesthood, schools, and ritual retreat houses. These uses would parallel functions represented in similar contexts after Spanish contact with the Postclassic period Maya.

The courtyards within the Acropolis each had four sides, although they were not square. Although the courtyards were all on different vertical levels, this appears to have been a deliberate decision by planners, and the multi-level nature of the complex was intentionally maintained throughout its period of use, even though the architectural layout, floor levels, and access between courtyards changed over time. The courtyards were enclosed by a labyrinthine mass of multi-level architecture decorated with complex sculpture representing mythic and historical subjects, combined with hieroglyphic texts.

=== Structures ===
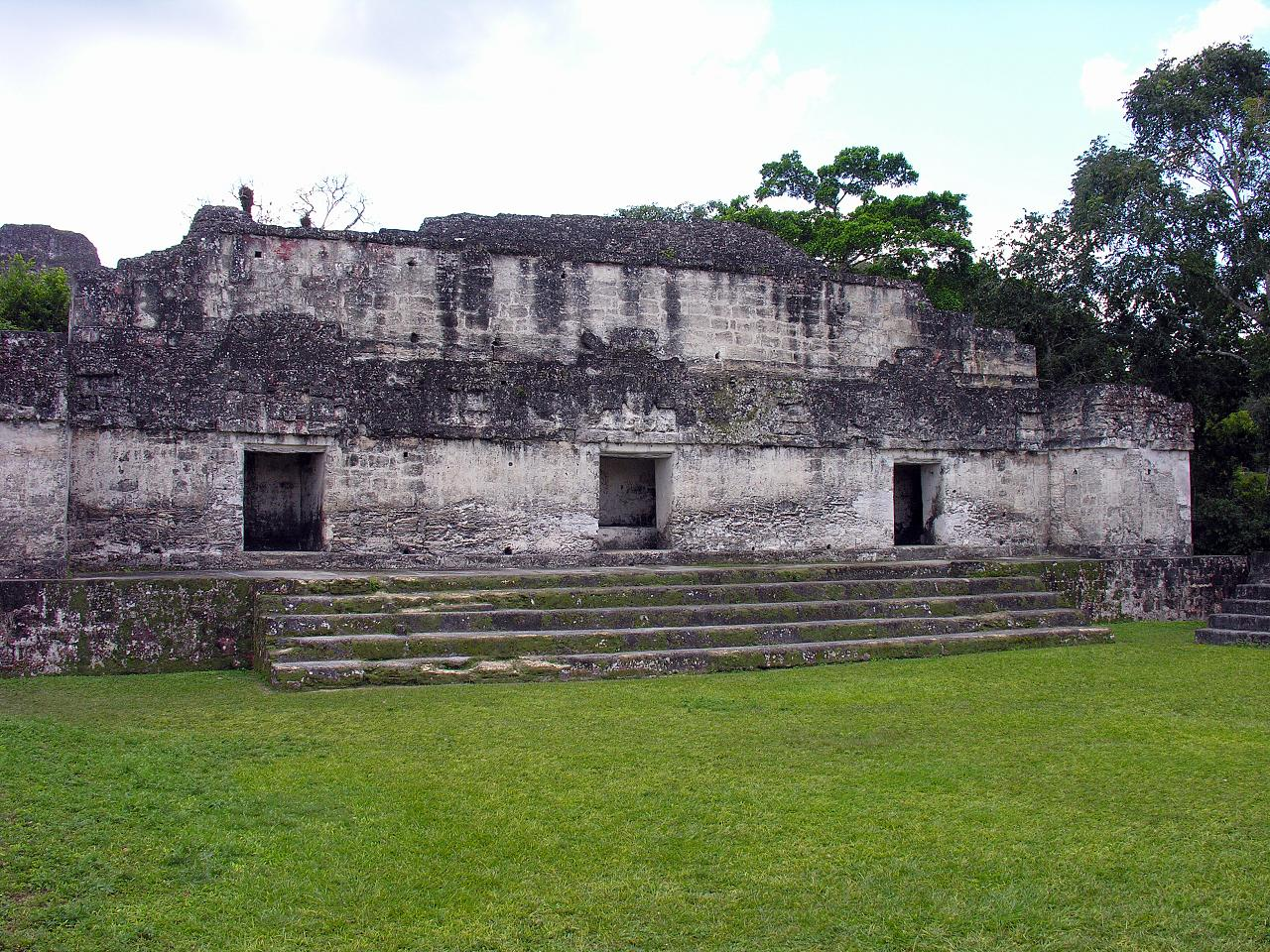
The east façade of Structure 5D-65, also known as Maler's Palace

5D-46 was an opulent, complex structure and was likely to have been the residence of the royal family; it was built upon levelled bedrock. Four burials were excavated under the structure. The structure has been dated to about AD 350 by a combination of radiocarbon dating and ceramic evidence. A hieroglyphic inscription on a ceramic vessel interred under the principal western stairway identifies the building as the residence of king Chak Tok Ich'aak I, who reigned from c. 360 until his violent death in 378 AD. Structure 5D-46 was a single-storey palace built upon a raised platform, with stairways giving access on the east and west sides. The west stairway remained relatively unchanged throughout five centuries of development, while the east stairway underwent various alterations, each modification being marked by a dedicatory human burial with associated grave goods. It is notable that this palace structure was not pillaged during the corresponding conquest, nor was it buried under later construction, although later modifications to its original layout did occur, even though other structures from the same period, in common Maya practice, were buried by later construction projects. The original structure is thought to have been the clan house of Chak Tok Ich'aak's lineage.

The Irma Structure is a very early platform with post holes from a perishable structure. It was found immediately to the south of the south patio of Structure 5D-46, and was built directly upon levelled bedrock. It was the most impressive of the earliest platforms, and was likely to have been the first royal residence in the Central Acropolis. The Irma Structure was buried under later flooring, and subsequently under the 9th-century AD expansion of Structure 5D-46, which included the addition of its south patio, a part of the wall of which ran straight across the earlier structure.

5D-52 faced southwards; it was built over an earlier structure that faced in the opposite direction. The earlier structure is known as the Palace of the Red Dado, due to a band of red decoration painted around the base of the interior walls. Later construction resulted in the destruction at the base of its former corbel vaulting, but below that the walls are very well preserved. This underlying structure has not yet been dated.

5D-57 has not been completely excavated, but when the exterior of this complex building was uncovered, two images of a ruler were revealed, accompanied by a short hieroglyphic text. The scene celebrates the capture of an important person allied with Calakmul by Tikal king Jasaw Chan Kʼawiil I. This event took place in AD 695, and the structure was built soon afterwards. Structure 5D-57 was probably Jasaw Ch'an K'awiil's royal residence.

5D-60 has not been thoroughly excavated, and its exact nature is unknown. However, it possessed a false façade facing north towards the side of Temple I. This false front gave the impression of a high, terraced temple, although the superstructure is not laid out like a temple shrine and was only accessible from the summit. This façade had been added to a pre-existing structure, which is now buried under later construction.

5D-65 has been nicknamed Maler's Palace. Its western façade was the retaining wall of the southwest side of the acropolis. The west room of the structure has an exterior doorway opening above the retaining wall. The room's interior possesses a large, recessed false doorway opposite the exterior door, designed to give the illusion of a temple when viewed from below.

5D-71 faces north onto the Great Plaza. The remains of an early masonry platform dating to c. 350 BC – 1 AD were found underneath the structure. It was located on the sacred axis that runs through the North Acropolis, but not enough has been uncovered to state whether or not the early structure was centred upon that axis.

=== Burials ===
Burial 177 was a small chamber cist. It was found under the fill of Courtyard 1, interred on the sacred axis of the acropolis, also the central axis of Structure 5D-71; it was dated to the Early Classic period. The buried individual is likely to have been very high in status.

Burial 180 was found under the external stairway of Structure 5D-46, and was apparently interred as a dedicatory offering. It was not accompanied by any grave goods.
