= Dark Sun (Maya ruler) =

Dark Sun (Nunoom Che'en?)
- Ajaw
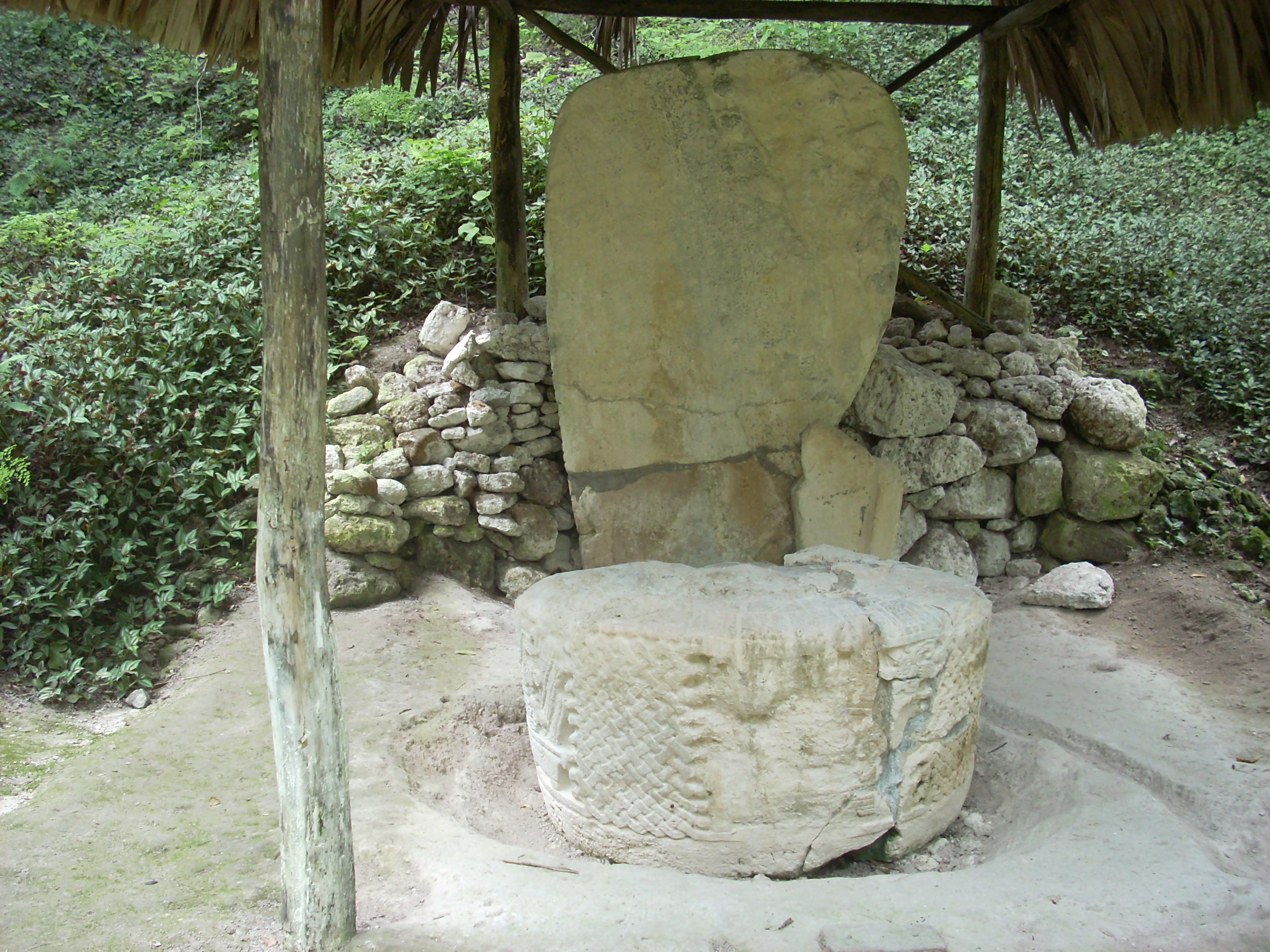
- Dark Sun's portrait on Stela 24

King of Tikal
- Reign: c. 810
- Predecessor: Nuun Ujol K'inich
- Successor: Jewel K'awiil
- Died: Tikal
- Father: Nuun Ujol K'inich (possibly)
- Religion: Maya religion

Dark Sun (Note: The ruler's name, when transcribed is tz'a?-no?-CH'E:N?-na, Martin & Grube 2008, p. 52.) (fl. 810), was an ajaw of the Maya city of Tikal. He ruled c. 810 and was probably the son of Nuun Ujol K'inich. The monuments associated with Dark Sun are: Stela 24; Altar 7; Temple 3 Lintel 2?.

== Footnotes ==
Regnal titles
Preceded by Nuun Ujol K'inich	Ajaw of Tikal c.810	Succeeded by Jewel K'awiil
