= Nuun Ujol Kʼinich =

- Ajaw

King of Tikal
- Reign: Between 794 and 810
- Predecessor: Yax Nuun Ahiin II
- Successor: Dark Sun
- Died: Tikal
- Issue: Dark Sun?
- Religion: Maya religion

Nuun Ujol Kʼinich (Note: The ruler's name, when transcribed is ?-u-JOL KʼINICH, translated "?-headed Sun God", Martin & Grube 2008, p.52.) (fl. 800?), was an ajaw of the Maya city of Tikal. He ruled sometime between 794 and 810 and he was probably father of Dark Sun.

== Footnotes ==
Regnal titles
Preceded by Yax Nuun Ahiin II	Ajaw of Tikal sometime between 794 and 810	Succeeded by Dark Sun
