= Foliated Jaguar =

- Foliated Jaguar's glyph

Ajaw of Tikal
- Reign: 2nd/3rd century
- Predecessor: Yax Ehb Xook
- Successor: Animal Headdress
- Religion: Maya religion

Foliated Jaguar, (Note: The ruler's name, when transcribed is ?-BAHLAM, translated "?-Jaguar", Martin & Grube 2008, p.26.) also known as Scroll Ahau Jaguar, (fl. 2nd/3rd century) was ajaw of the Maya city-state of Tikal.

== Footnotes ==
Regnal titles
Preceded by Yax Ehb Xook	Ajaw of Tikal; 2nd/3rd century	Succeeded by Animal Headdress
