= Animal Headdress =

- Animal Headdress's glyph

Ajaw of Tikal
- Reign: c. 290
- Predecessor: Foliated Jaguar
- Successor: Sihyaj Chan K'awiil I
- Spouse: Lady Skull
- Issue: Sihyaj Chan K'awiil I
- Religion: Maya religion

Animal Headdress, (Note: The ruler's name, when transcribed is ? K'INICH-E:B-?, Martin & Grube 2008, p.26.) (fl. c. 292) was ajaw ("lord") of the Maya city-state of Tikal. He was father of his successor Sihyaj Chan K'awiil I and husband of Lady Skull.

== Footnotes ==
Regnal titles
| Preceded by Foliated Jaguar | Ajaw of Tikal c.290 | Succeeded by Sihyaj Chan K'awiil I |
