= Chak Tok Ichʼaak II =

Ajaw of the Maya city of Tikal (died 508)

- Ajaw

King of Tikal
- Reign: 26 September 485 - 24 July 508
- Predecessor: Kʼan Chitam
- Successor: Lady of Tikal and Kaloomteʼ Bahlam
- Born: Tikal
- Died: 24 July 508; Tikal
- Issue: Wak Chan Kʼawiil; Lady of Tikal (possibly)
- Father: Kʼan Chitam
- Mother: Lady Tzutz Nik of Naranjo
- Religion: Maya religion

Chak Tok Ichʼaak II, (Note: The ruler's name, when transcribed is CHAK-TOK-ICHʼA꞉K, translated "Great Misty? Claw", Martin & Grube 2008, p.37.) also known as Jaguar Paw II and Jaguar Paw Skull (died 24 July 508), was an ajaw of the Maya city of Tikal. He took the throne c. 486 and reigned until his death. (Note: These are the dates indicated on the Maya inscriptions in Mesoamerican Long Count calendar, Death: 9.3.13.12.5 13 Chikchan 13 Xul, Martin & Grube 2008, p.37.) He was son of Kʼan Chitam and Lady Tzutz Nik, daughter of Tzik'in Bahlam, ruler of Naranjo. The monuments associated with Chak Tok Ichʼaak II are Stelae 3, 7, 15, 21, and possibly 26.

== Footnotes ==
Regnal titles
Preceded by Kʼan Chitam	Ajaw of Tikal c.486-July 24, 508	Succeeded by Lady of Tikal and Kaloomteʼ Bahlam
