= El Temblor =

Archaeological site in Guatemala

- Location within Guatemala
- 17°3′42″N 89°36′42″W
- Periods: Late Classic (possibly)
- Cultures: Maya
- Location: Flores
- Region: Petén Department, Guatemala

El Temblor is an archaeological site in Petén Department, Guatemala which was once the location of a settlement of the Maya civilization. First recorded in 1974 by Ian Graham of Harvard University's Peabody Museum, the site represents a medium-sized and compact settlement about 18 kilometres (11 mi) south-south-east of the ruined Mayan city of Tikal and about 13 kilometres (8.1 mi) north-east of the ruins of Ixlu. It is situated in a wooded area called Paso del Carmen, a few kilometers east of the modern village of El Caoba. It is designated TMB in the Corpus of Maya Hieroglyphic Inscriptions.

== Description ==
The ruins at El Temblor consist of at least three groups of collapsed structures or platforms on a north-south axis. The northernmost group, designated as Group A, is clustered in a wooded hilltop and includes a pyramid standing over 10 metres (33 ft) high. A long structure similar to a palace, at least 5 metres (16 ft) in length, is situated to its north-east. A damaged stela stands east of the pyramid.

Group B is located in a lower and flatter area to the south and includes at least five mounds or platforms. Group C is located further south along the site's main axis and comprises eight structures on a hill, possibly representing temples and palaces. A chultun, a bottle-shaped underground storage chamber, is situated to the west of Group C.

The site is unguarded and has been badly damaged by looters who have dug trenches and mutilated stelae. Around 1970, two sawn-off inscribed sides from an El Temblor stela were offered for sale by a New York City art gallery which claimed it to be of unknown provenance, presumed to be from Belize. One side was purchased by the Nasher Museum of Art at Duke University in Durham, North Carolina. The other side was purchased privately and its whereabouts are unknown.

El Temblor has not yet been investigated archaeologically. However, its visible architectural features suggest that it dates from the Late Classic period (circa AD 600–909).
