= Nuun Ujol Chaak =

- Ajaw

King of Tikal
- Reign: before 657-c.679
- Predecessor: 24th Ruler
- Successor: Jasaw Chan Kʼawiil I
- Born: before 657; Tikal
- Died: c. 679; Tikal
- Spouse: Lady Jaguar Seat
- Issue: Jasaw Chan Kʼawiil I
- Father: Kʼinich Muwaan Jol II
- Religion: Maya religion

Nuun Ujol Chaak (Note: The ruler's name, when transcribed is ?-(u)-JOL CHA:K, translated "?-headed CHAAK", Martin & Grube 2008, p.42.) also known as Shield Skull and Nun Bak Chak (born before 657 – c. 679), was an ajaw of the major Maya city of Tikal. He took the throne before 657 and reigned probably until his death.

== Biography ==
Nuun Ujol Chaak was a child of K'inich Muwaan Jol II, and brother to Bʼalaj Chan Kʼawiil.

In 648 a civil war broke out in Tikal between the 2 brothers where B'alaj Chan Kawiil would see victory against an important nobleman named Lam Naah K'awiil at an unknown site named Sakha'al. The Tikal Civil War would lead to the splitting of Tikal with the Capital of Tikal under the control of Nuun Ujol Chaak and his brother controlling the Southwest area. which was based out of Dos Pilas.

On 12 January 657 A.D. Tikal was attacked by Yuknoom Ch'een II in a star war which forced Nuun Ujol Chaak to flee. Shortly after the King's flee, it appears that he had submitted to Calakmul due to his attendance at Yuhknoom Yich’aak K’ahk’s pre-accession event between 657 A.D. and 662 A.D. and therefore witnessing him as their future lord.

On 8 December 672 A.D. Nuun Ujol Chaak attacked Dos Pilas and attempted to hunt down his brother. He held Dos Pilas for 5 years and in that time he would burn or capture 3 cities allied to Dos Pilas such as Chaahk Naah. In 677 Calakmul would enter the fray with B'alaj Chan Kawiil and by 679 A.D. the war would be finished with a massacre of Tikal. The fate of Nuun Ujol Chaak is unknown but due to the lack of records after this time, it's deducted that he perished during the conquest.

== Family ==
Nuun Ujol Chaak was married to Lady Jaguar Seat although not much is known about her. He would father Jasaw Chan Kʼawiil I 3 years after his possible death, with his brother Bʼalaj Chan Kʼawiil ruling Tikal in those 3 years. Jasaw Chan Kʼawiil I would be a celebrated Ajaw with him seeing the end of Tikal's 130 year hiatus and overseeing its revitalization.

== Notes ==
Regnal titles
Preceded by 24th Ruler	Ajaw of Tikal before 657 – c. 679	Succeeded by Jasaw Chan Kʼawiil I
