= Lady of Tikal =

Ix Yo'kin (Lady of Tikal)
- Ajaw

Queen of Tikal with co-ruler (husband?) Kaloomteʼ Bahlam
- Reign: 19 April 511 - 527/534
- Predecessor: Chak Tok Ichʼaak II
- Successor: Bird Claw
- Born: 1 September 504; Tikal
- Died: 537; Tikal
- Spouse: Kaloomteʼ Bahlam (possibly)
- Father: Chak Tok Ichʼaak II (possibly)
- Mother: Lady K’ahk’ of Yokel
- Religion: Maya religion

Lady of Tikal, (Note: The ruler's name, when transcribed is IX-KALO꞉M[TEʼ] IX-?-KʼIN?, Martin & Grube 2008, p.38.) also known as Woman of Tikal (1 September 504 – after c. 527), was a queen regnant of the Mayan city of Tikal. She took the throne on 19 April 511 and reigned until about 527. (Note: These are the dates indicated in the Maya inscriptions in Mesoamerican Long Count calendar, Birth: 9.3.9.13.3 8 Akʼbal 11 Mol and Accession: 9.3.16.8.4 11 Kʼan 17 Pop, (Martin & Grube 2008, p.38).)

== Biography ==
According to the inscription on Stela 23, the Lady of Tikal assumed a leadership role on 19 April 511, at the age of six, but did not rule on her own. Instead, she co-ruled with an individual named Kaloomteʼ Bahlam. She was possibly the daughter of Chak Tok Ichʼaak II. Lady of Tikal was depicted on Stela 23, which was broken and later re-erected incomplete. It is presumed that Stela 6 and Stela 12 also mention Lady of Tikal, but she is referred to by a different name. Her relationship to Bird Claw, who may have been her successor (and the 20th ruler of Tikal), is unknown due to problems deciphering the text of Stela 8, but Bird Claw does not carry the Tikal emblem.

The name "Lady of Tikal" can also refer to Lady Six Sky of Dos Pilas/Naranjo, more commonly known as "Woman of Tikal". The first Lady of Tikal was born in September 504 while Lady Six Sky acceded to the throne at Naranjo in 682.

== Footnotes ==
Regnal titles
Preceded by Chak Tok Ichʼaak II	Ajaw of Tikal; April 19, 511-c.527 with Kaloomteʼ Bahlam co-ruler	Succeeded by Ete I
