= Sascab =

Naturally occurring mineral material

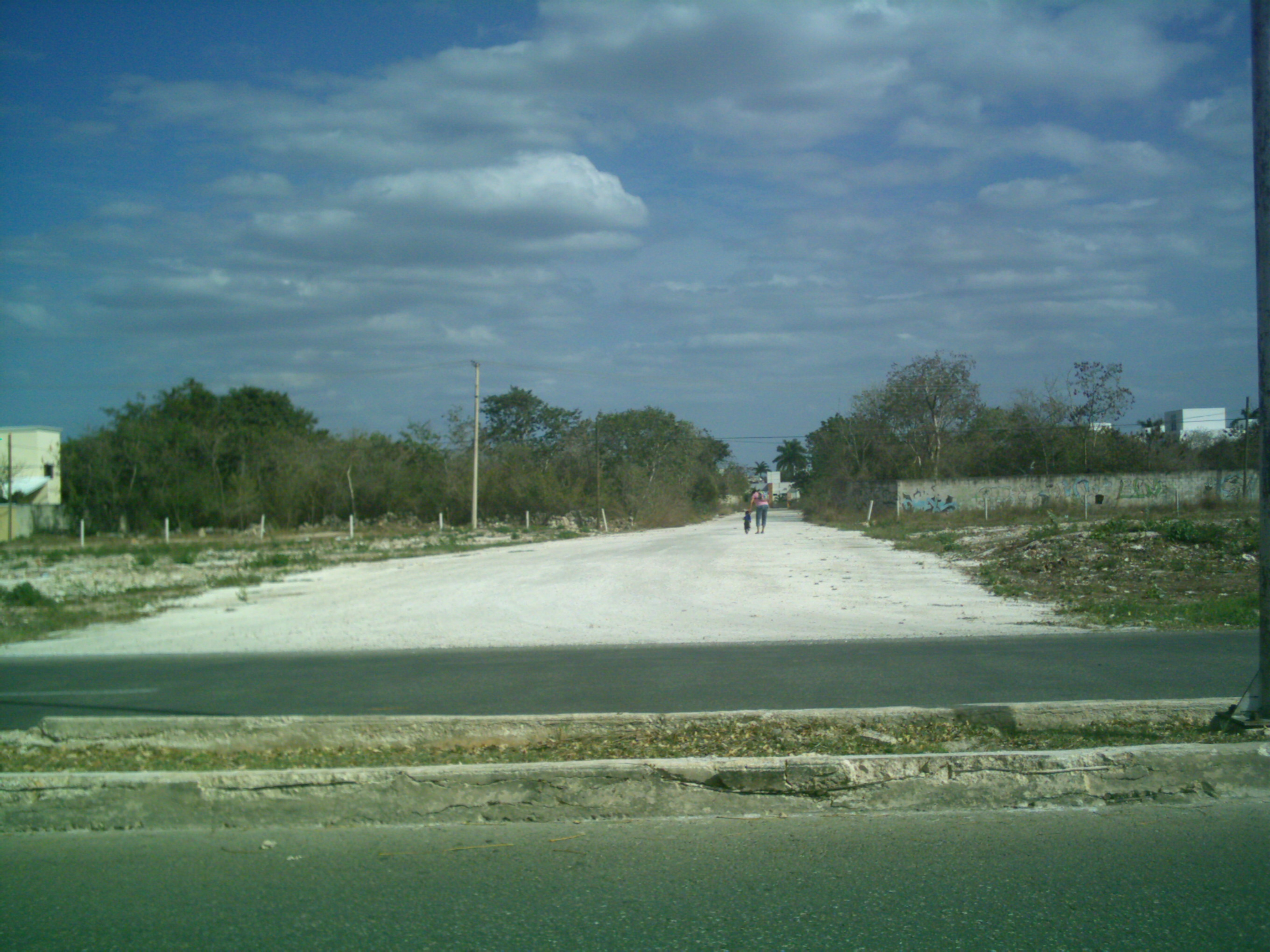

Sascab is a naturally occurring mineral material described variously as "decomposed limestone", "breccia", and "the lime gravel mixture the Maya used as mortar." It has been used as a building and paving material in Mesoamerica since antiquity. In the context of pottery the term may also apply to mixtures (with clay and water) of a more finely divided form of the same material (described as "stone dust").

It was used by the ancient Maya in place of (or as a partial replacement for) lime in some applications, without needing to be "burned."

According to travel writer Jeanine Kitchel, the American explorer of the Yucatan, Edward Herbert Thompson found (ca.1900) "shallow quarries near Chichen Itza with worked veins of sascab..."
