= Jasaw Chan Kʼawiil II =

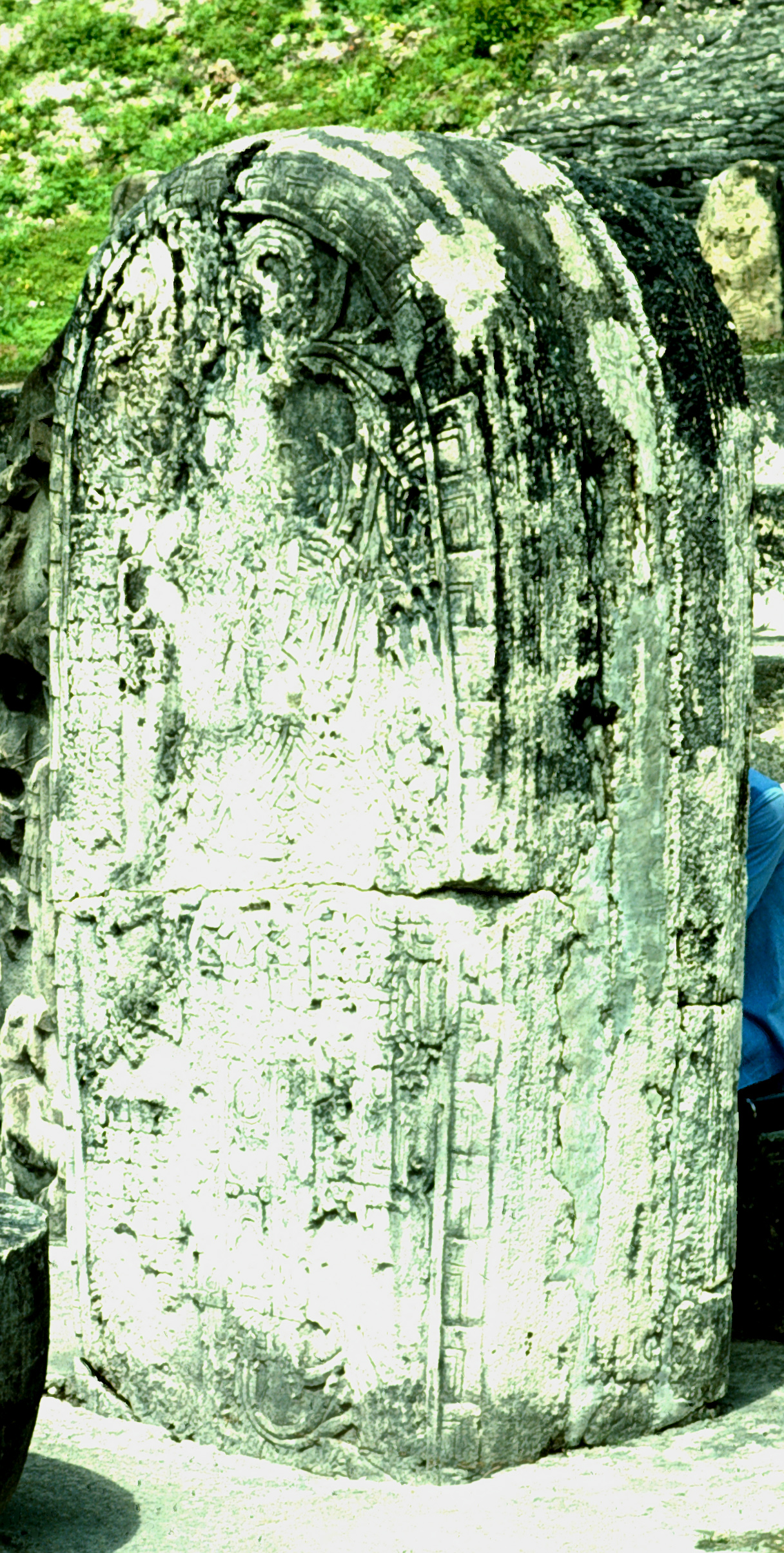
- Jasaw Chan Kʼawiil II's portrait on Stela 11.

King of Tikal
- Reign: c. 869
- Predecessor: Jewel Kʼawiil
- Successor: None
- Born: 850; Tikal
- Died: 898; Tikal?
- Religion: Maya religion

Jasaw Chan Kʼawiil II (Note: The ruler's name, when transcribed is ja-sa-wa-CHAN KʼAWI꞉L, translated "Kʼawiil that Clears? the Sky", Martin & Grube 2008, p. 52.) also known as Stela 11 Ruler, (fl. 869), was an ajaw of the Maya city of Tikal. He ruled c. 869. The monuments associated with Jasaw Chan Kʼawiil II are: Stela 11 and Altar 11.

Reigning at a time when Tikal had already declined as a regional and political power, Jasaw Chan Kʼawiil is Tikal's last-known ruler identifiable from extant inscriptions. His only known monument is a stela and its accompanying altar, with an inscription bearing the latest date of any yet recovered and deciphered in Tikal. Labelled as Stela 11, the monument is the only one from the Terminal Classic period found at Tikal, and contains a Mesoamerican Long Count calendar date of 10.2.0.0.0 3 Ajaw 3 Kej, correlating to August 15, 869 in the proleptic Gregorian calendar. (Note: Using the GMT-correlation, JDN=584283.)

== Footnotes ==
Regnal titles
Preceded by Jewel Kʼawiil	Ajaw of Tikal c.869	Succeeded by none
