= List of lords of Tikal =

Ajaw of Tikal
- Emblem glyph of Tikal

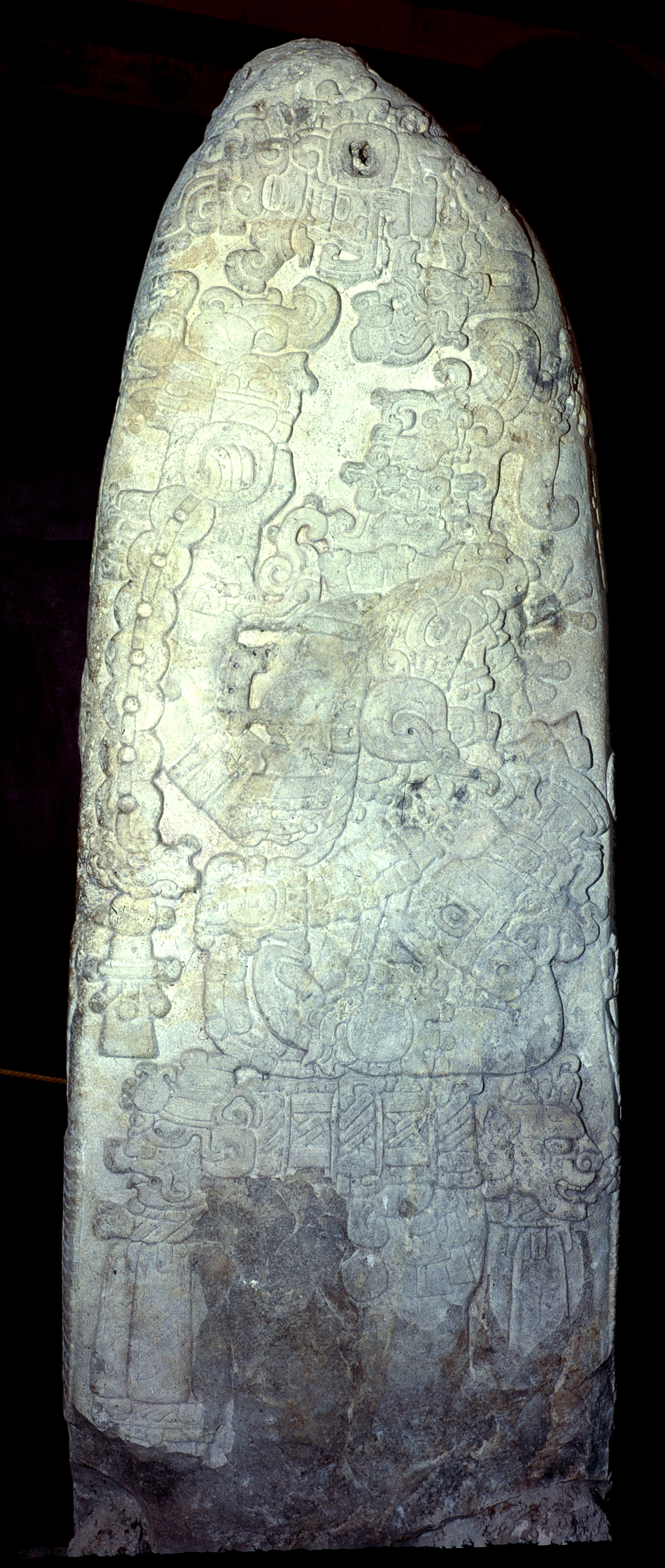
- Sihyaj Chan K'awiil II on frontispiece of Stela 31 of Tikal / 2010 photograph by HJPD / via Commons

Details
- Style: ajaw; k'uhul ajaw; kaloomte'; ochk'in kaloomte'
- First monarch: Yax Ehb Xook
- Last monarch: Jasaw Chan K'awiil II / last known
- Formed: c. AD 90
- Abolished: c. 869
- Residence: Tikal

This is a list of rulers of Tikal, a major Maya city-state during the Classic period. Located in the Maya Lowlands, Tikal is known to have had at least 33 rulers from the 1st through 9th centuries AD. Twenty-seven of these have been identified, as of 2008. (Note: Dates sourced from Martin & Grube 2008 are in the Julian calendar, converted from the Maya Long Count via the GMT+2 correlation (Martin & Grube 2008, p. 13).)

== Background ==
The monarchy of Tikal is the oldest yet known in the Maya Lowlands, having been founded at the turn of the 1st century AD. The dynasty is last attested in the late 9th century, after a span of some 800 years and at least 33 rulers. Thorough excavations, first begun by the University of Pennsylvania, and later by the Guatemalan Institute of Archaeology, have uncovered troves of epigraphic data which Mayanists have employed to reconstruct Tikal's dynastic lineage. As of 2008, 27 rulers have been identified, including at least one woman.

== List ==
The following is an annotated, chronological list of known lords of Tikal. A tabular list is provided in the following section. (Note: English language names are provisional nicknames based on rulers' identifying glyphs, where their Maya language names have not yet been definitively deciphered phonetically.)

=== Late Preclassic ===
- Yax Ehb Xook – r. c. AD 16 or c. AD 60; dynastic founder.
- "Foliated Jaguar"/Huun? B'alam ("Decorated Jaguar") – r. 90.

=== Early Classic ===
- Chak Tok Ichʼaak I – r. January 25, 212–292.
- Kʼinich Ehbʼ – r. c. 300.
- Siyaj Chan Kʼawiil I - r. c. 307.
- Ix Uneʼn Bahlam ("Queen Jaguar") – r. 317.
- Way Ko? Chanal Chak Wak ("Leyden Plate Ruler") – r. 320.
- Kʼinich Muwaan Jol I – r. c. 359.
- Chak Tok Ichʼaak II ("Jaguar Paw I") – r. c. 360–378; died on the same day that Siyaj Kʼakʼ arrived in Tikal.
- Yax Nuun Ahiin I – r. 379–404; son of a foreign noble.
- Sihyaj Chan Kʼawiil II ("Stormy Sky II") – r. 411–456; son of Yax Nuun Ayiin I.
- Kʼan Chitam ("Kan Boar") – r. 458–486.
- Maʼkin-na Chan – r. c. late 5th century.
- Chak Tok Ichʼaak III ("Jaguar Paw Skull") – r. 486–508; married "Lady Hand."
- Ix Kaloʼmteʼ Ix Ch'ajan Mut Ix Yo Kʼin ("Lady of Tikal") – r. 511–527; co-ruled with Kaloomteʼ Bʼalam, possibly as consort.
- Kaloomteʼ Bʼalam ("Curl-Head," "19th Lord") – r. 511–527; co-ruled with Ix Kaloʼmteʼ Ix Yo Kʼin as regent.
- "Bird Claw" ("Animal Skull I," "Ete I") – r. c. 527–537.
- Wak Chan Kʼawiil ("Double-Bird") – r. 537–562; captured and possibly sacrificed in Caracol.
- "Lizard Head II" – r. unknown; lost a battle to Caracol in 562.
- K'inich Waaw 508? c. 593–628

=== Late Classic ===
- Jasaw Chan Kʼawiil I ("Ruler A," "Ah Cacao") – r. 682–734; entombed in Temple I; married Lady Lahan Unen Moʼ; won a battle against Calakmul in 711.
- Yikʼin Chan Kʼawiil ("Ruler B") – r. 734–766; tomb unknown.
- "Temple VI Ruler" – r. 766–768.
- Yax Nuun Ayiin II – r. 768–790.
- Nuno'm Ch'e'en ("Dark Sun") – r. c. 810; buried in Temple III.
- "Jewel Kʼawil" – r. 849.
- Jasaw Chan Kʼawiil II – r. 869–889

== Table ==
List of known sovereigns of Tikal.
Name	a.k.a.	No.	From	To	Note
Yax Ehb Xook	Yax Moch Xok; Yax Chakte'l Xok	1st	c. 90	c. 110	Founder
...? B'alam	Foliated Jaguar; Scroll Ahau Jaguar	?	?	?	–
Chak Tok Ich'aak I		9th?	212	c. 280?	Accession 25 Jan. 212.
Kinich Ehb' ...?	Animal Headdress	10th	c. 280	c. 300	Possible son of Chak Tok Ich'aak I
Sihyaj Chan K'awiil I	–	11th	c. 307	c. 310	Son of Animal Headdress
Unen Bahlam	–	12th?	c. 317	c. 320	–
K'inich Muwaan Jol	Mahk'ina Bird Skull; Feather Skull	13th	c. 330	359	Death 23 May 359, possibly
Chak Tok Ich'aak II	Jaguar Paw; Great Paw; Great Jaguar Paw; Jaguar Paw III; Toh Chak Ich'ak	14th	360	378	Son of K'inich Muwaan Jol; Accession 7 Aug. 360, registered; Death 15 Jan. 378
Yax Nuun Ahiin I	Curl Snout; Curl Nose	?	379	c. 404	Son of Spearthrower Owl; Accession 12 Sep. 379; Death 17 Jun. 404, possibly
Sihyaj Chan K'awiil II	Stormy Sky; Manikin Cleft Sky	16th	411	456	Son of Yax Nuun Ahiin I; Accession 26 Nov. 411; Death 3 Feb. 456
K'an Chitam	Kan Boar; K'an Ak	?	458	c. 486	Son of Sihyaj Chan K'awiil II; Birth 26 Nov. 415, possibly; Accession 8 Aug. 458
Chak Tok Ich'aak II	Jaguar Paw Skull; Jaguar Paw II	?	c. 486	508	Son of K'an Chitam; Death 24 Jul. 508
Ch'ajan Mut, 'Ix Yok'in	Lady of Tikal; Woman of Tikal	?	511	c. 527?	Daughter of Chak Tok Ich'aak II, possibly; Birth 1 Sep. 504; Accession 19 Apr. 511
Kalo'mte' Bahlam	Curl Head	19th	c. 511	c. 527	–
[K'inich?] Waaw I	Twentieth Ruler	20th	?	?	a.k.a. Bird Claw or Animal Skull I or Ete I, possibly
Wak Chan K'awiil	Double Bird	21st	537	562	Son of Chak Tok Ich'aak II; Accession 29 Dec. 537, possibly
K'inich Waaw II	Animal Skull	22nd	c. 590	c. 620	Son of Fire Cross
?	Twenty-third Ruler	23rd	?	?	–
?	Twenty-fourth Ruler	24th	?	?	–
Nuun Ujol Chaak	Shield Skull; Nun Bak Chak	?	c. 655	c. 680	Son of K'inich Muwaan Jol II, possibly
Jasaw Chan K'awiil I	Ruler A; Ah Cacao; Sky Rain	?	682	734	Son of Nuun Ujol Chaak; Accession 3 May 683
Yik'in Chan K'awiil	Ruler B; Yaxkin Caan Chac; Sun Sky Rain	27th	734	c. 746	Son of Jasaw Chan K'awiil I; Accession 8 Dec. 734
?	Twenty-eighth Ruler	28th	c. 766	768	Son of Yik'in Chan K'awiil
Yax Nuun Ahiin II	Ruler C; Chitam	29th	768	c. 794	Son of Yik'in Chan K'awiil; Accession 25 Dec. 768
Nuun Ujol K'inich	–	?	c. 800	c. 800	–
Nunoo'm Ch'e'en	Dark Sun	?	c. 810	c. 810	–
Jewel K'awiil	–	?	c. 849	c. 849	Son of Nuun Ujol K'inich, possibly
Jasaw Chan K'awiil II	Stela 11 Ruler	?	c. 869	c. 869	–

== See also ==
- Maya monarchs, listing known rulers of various Classic and Post-Classic Maya states
- Lists of ancient monarchs, listing lists of known rulers of various ancient Old and New World states

== Notes and references ==
=== Full citations ===
1. FAMSI (2012) [First published ca 2004 by FAMSI]. "Maya Royal Dynasties" (PDF). FAMSI (Guide) (Revised by Inga E Calvin ed.). Los Angeles, California: Los Angeles County Museum of Art. Archived (PDF) from the original on 18 June 2023.
2. Martin S, Grube N (2008) [First published 2000 by Thames & Hudson]. Chronicle of the Maya Kings and Queens: Deciphering the Dynasties of the Ancient Maya (2nd ed.). London: Thames & Hudson. ISBN 978-0-500-28726-2. LCCN 2008396649.
3. Sharer RJ, Traxler LP (2006) [First published 1946 by SUP]. The Ancient Maya (6th ed.). Stanford, California: Stanford University Press. ISBN 0-8047-4816-0. LCCN 2005003043.
