= Kaloomteʼ Bahlam =

- Ajaw
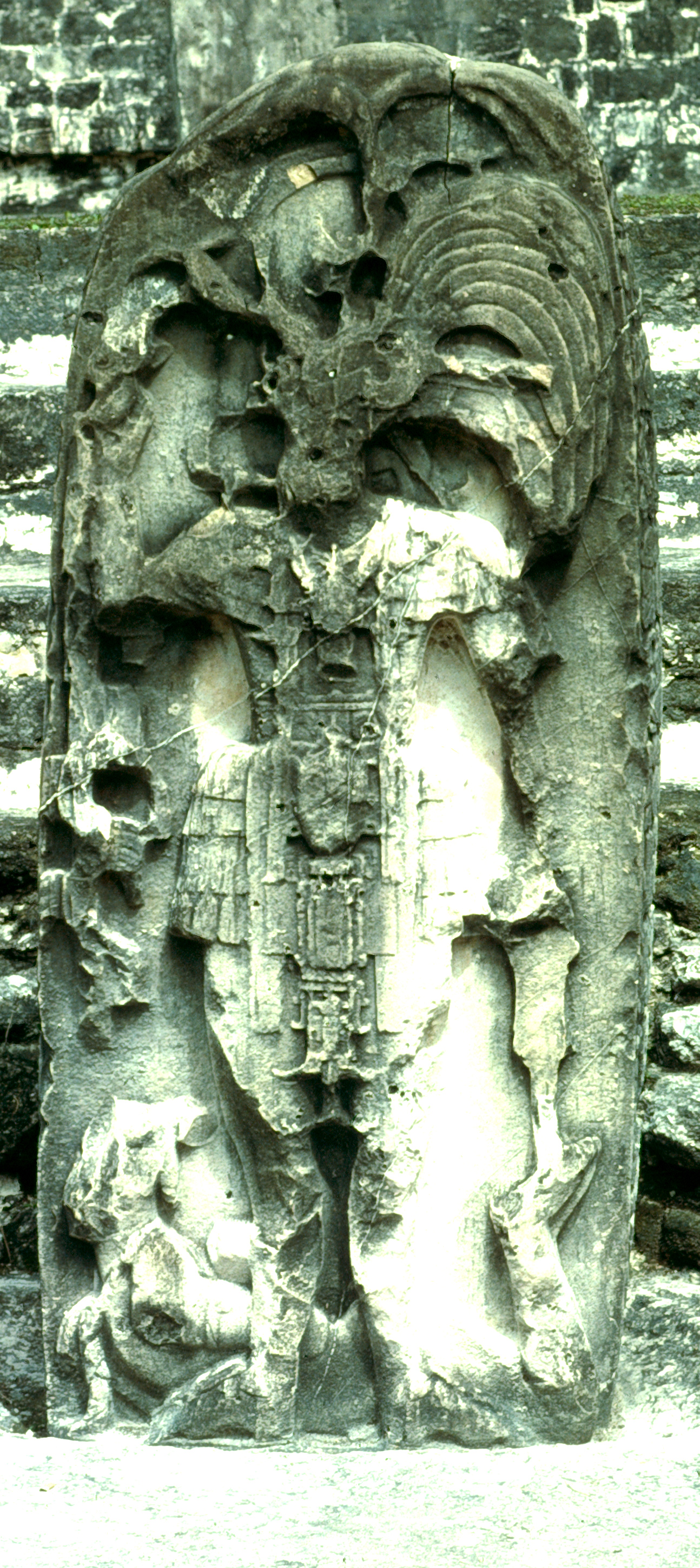
- Stela 10 representing Kaloomteʼ Bahlam.

King of Tikal
- Reign: 19 April 511 - c.527 (with co-ruler (wife?) Lady of Tikal)
- Predecessor: Chak Tok Ichʼaak II
- Successor: Bird Claw
- Died: after c. 527
- Spouse: Lady of Tikal (possibly)
- Religion: Maya religion

Kaloomteʼ Bahlam, (Note: The ruler's name, when transcribed is KALO꞉M[TEʼ]?[BAHLAM], Martin & Grube 2008, p.38.) also known as Curl Head (died after c. 527), was an ajaw or lord of the Maya city of Tikal. He took the throne on c. 511. He co-ruled with a Lady of Tikal. The monuments associated with Kaloomteʼ Bahlam are Stelae 10, 12 and 25.

== Footnotes ==
Regnal titles
Preceded by Chak Tok Ichʼaak II	Ajaw or lord of Tikal c.511-527 with Lady of Tikal co-ruler	Succeeded by Bird Claw
