= Structure II of Calakmul =

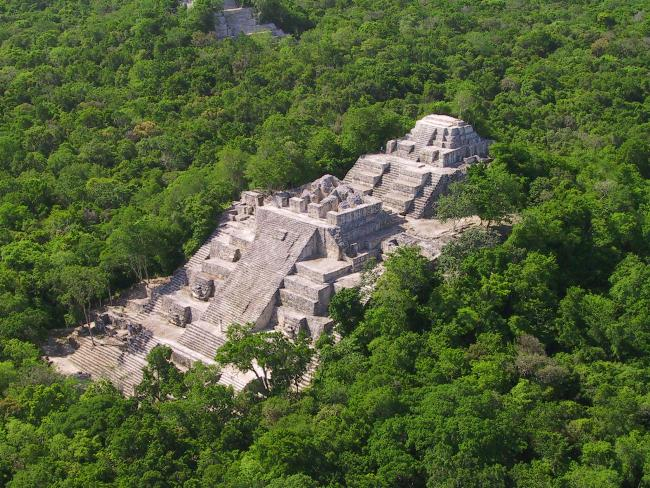
- Structure II in the jungle of the Calakmul Biosphere Reserve

- Location within Mexico
- Type: Maya pyramid
- Location: Calakmul, Mexico

History
- Built: 400 BC - 800 AD
- Original use: Maya temple

Site notes
- Height: 55 metres (180 ft)

UNESCO World Heritage Site
- Part of: Ancient Maya City and Protected Tropical Forests of Calakmul

Structure II of Calakmul is a monumental Maya pyramid located in the ancient city of Calakmul in the jungle of southern Campeche, Mexico. It is the main building of the city and was the core of political and ceremonial power in the region dominated by Calakmul. Structure II of Calakmul is one of the oldest constructions of the Maya civilization and the only one that presents such an extensive and complex sequence of construction. It was built in several continuous construction stages for more than 1200 years, encompassing a long history that dates back to the Middle Preclassic period and extended to the Late Classic period from 400 BC to 800 AD, each of these stages built the structure from above until its current appearance was completed before the abandonment of the city, going through 7 construction phases. Inside, several substructures are preserved, containing temples, monuments, sculptures, courtyards, vaulted corridors, mural paintings, and burial chambers with more than 20 elite burials in which luxurious grave goods have been found with jade offerings and finely painted ceramic vessels, the most important being the royal tomb of the ruler Yuknoom Yich'aak K'ahk' of the Kaanu'l dynasty.

Structure II is located south of the Great Plaza of the city, which constituted the center of political power in Calakmul. After the arrival of the Kaanu'l dynasty of Dzibanche in the late classic period, it became the seat of power of the Kaan kingdom. This main architectural group at the heart of the settlement was designed and built to recreate a mythological geography, with Structure II representing the concept of the sacred mountain that, within the Maya mythology, connected the world with the divine heaven, and whose caves were the place of origin of the ancestors and home of the deities.

== Archaeology ==
Structure II is a massive stepped pyramidal base and the largest building in Calakmul, measuring approximately 140 meters at its base and 55 meters (148 feet) high with a long central stairway flanked by large masks that lead to a palace at the top. Its construction is considered one of the greatest milestones of Maya architecture; its initial construction dates back to 400 BC and it was continuously built for more than 1200 years, showing a complete evolution of various artistic and architectural expressions. On its base are stelae 43, 44, 114, 115 and 116, while stelae 38, 39, 40, 41 and 42 are located in front of the structure, positioned in two rows. These monuments contain dates and events from the Early Classic period, Stela 43 records the use of the title K’uhul Chatahn Winik ("divine person of Chatahn"), a title belonging to an elite tradition in the Petén basin that was once worn by some ancient rulers of the city before the arrival of the Kaanu'l dynasty of Dzibanche in 636 to Calakmul to make it their capital.

=== Substructure II-C ===
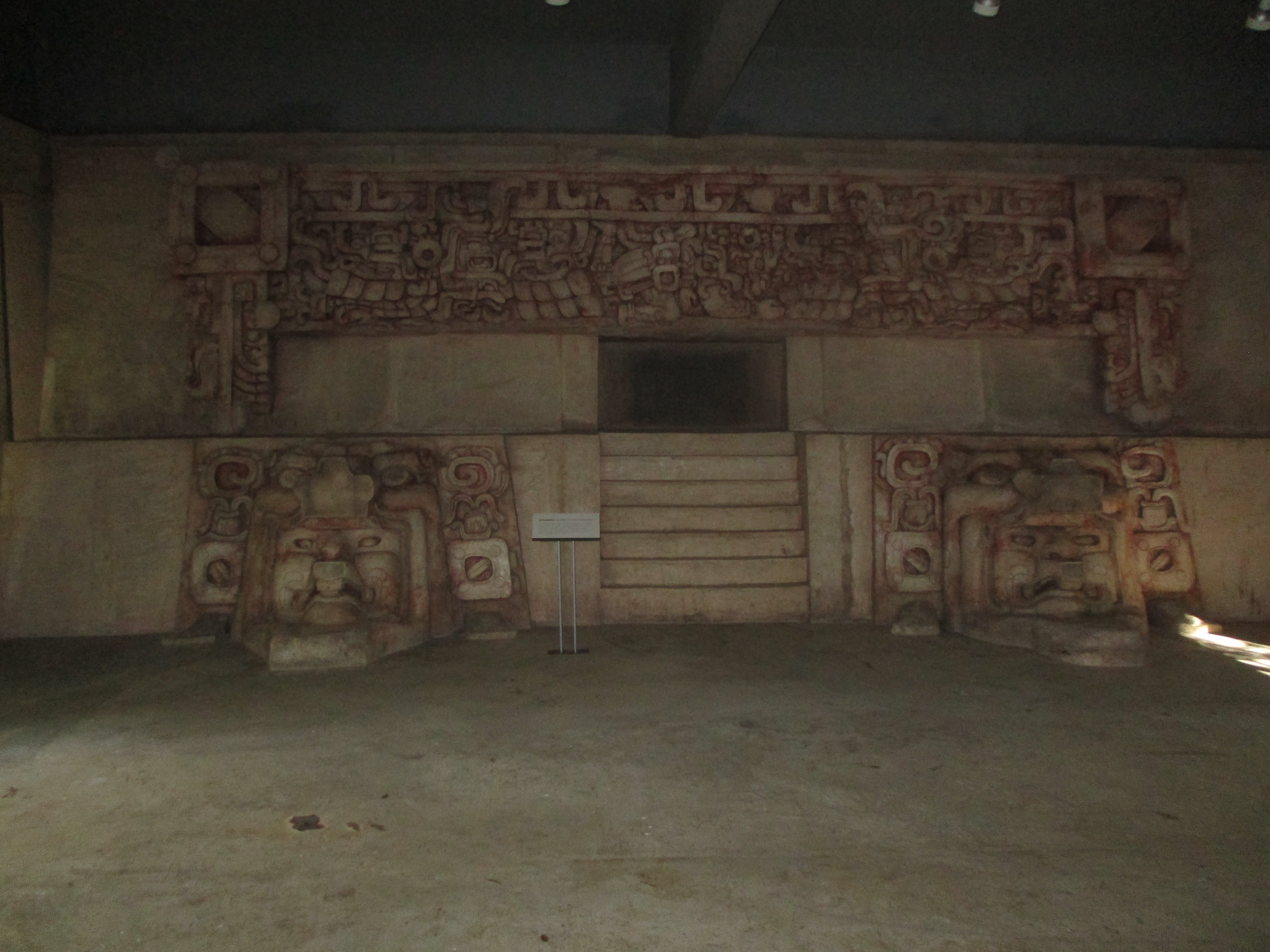
Replica of substructure II-C at the Calakmul Site Museum

Substructure II-C is the first architectural phase and the oldest inside Structure II, it was built in 400 BC during the Middle Preclassic period of the Maya civilization, being also one of the earliest and best preserved public buildings in the entire region, as it was protected in several later architectural stages. It was the initial aspect of the structure and the base from which it was built upon for more than 1200 years. It constitutes a 15-meter-high base with a large terrace with three buildings whose access is through a temple dedicated to the sacred mountain (sub II-C1) with a stairway flanked by two monumental masks 4 meters high with a notable Olmec reminiscence, these masks are depicted with jaguar features and fine headdresses and are associated with the maize god. At the top front of the temple is a monumental frieze over 3 meters high and 20 meters wide with a complex and vast mythological iconography representing the god Chaak. The temple entrance provides access to the terrace through a long vaulted corridor that represents and simulates the entrance to the cave of the sacred mountain, replicating as a whole a mythological geography that was used in rituals and ceremonies. This corridor is decorated with a fine mural painting depicting mythological scenes considered one of the earliest examples of Maya mural art; in this paintings the figure of a character holding a spear has been recognized, who has been identified as Jun Ajaw. This construction phase shows that during this period of the Middle Preclassic, Maya societies began to build structures that artificially recreated, through architecture, some early mythological concepts of great religious importance, such as the sacred cave, to serve as a stage for rituals and ceremonial practices and to reaffirm the divine character of the rulers.

=== Tomb of Yuknoom Yich'aak K'ahk' ===
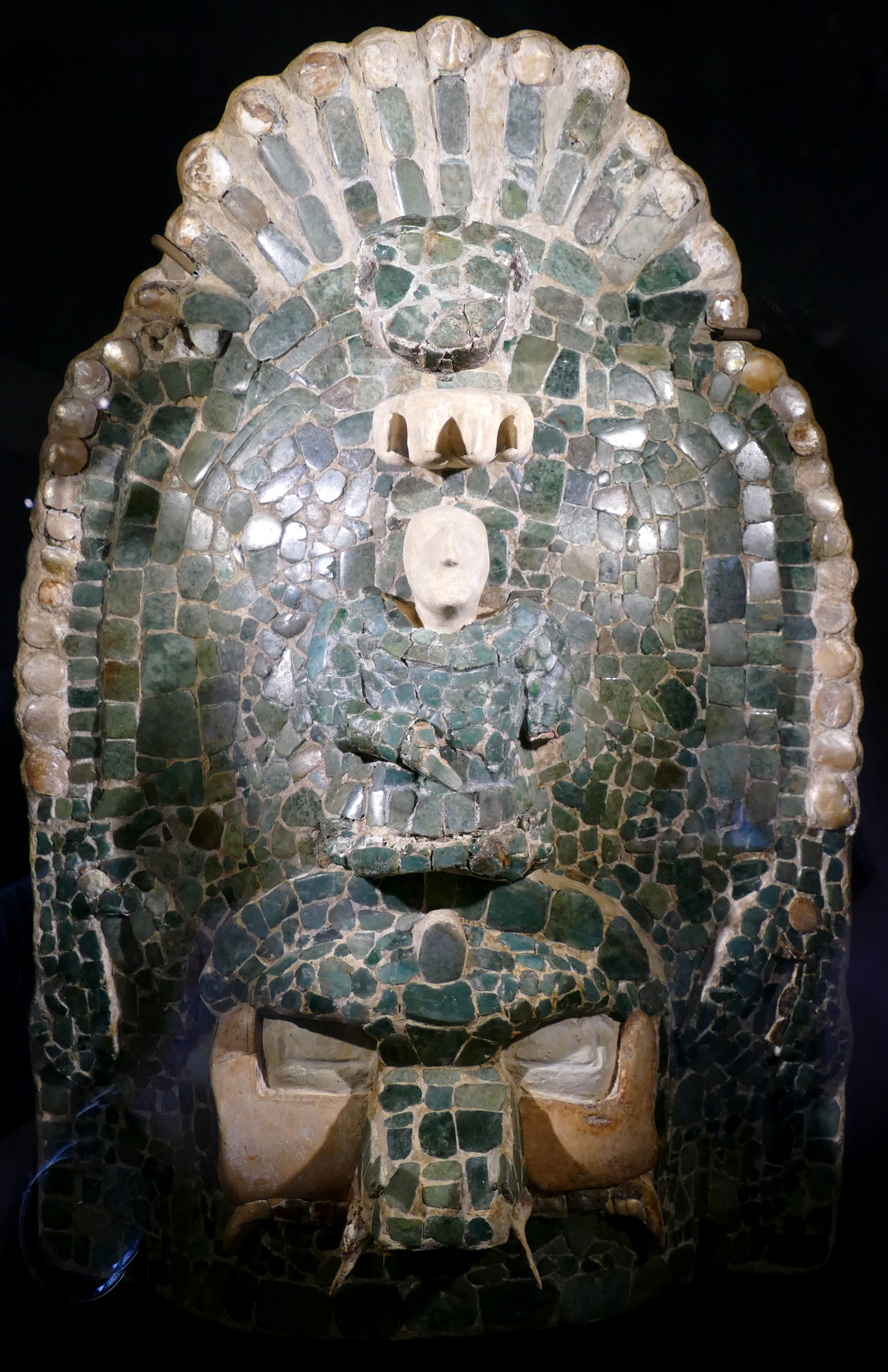
Jade funerary headdress of Yuknoom Yich'aak K'ahk'

Substructure II-B contains one of the most important burial chambers in the city, inside which a highly decorated tomb was discovered, archaeologically designated as Tomb 4 which corresponds to the royal burial of the ruler Yuknoom Yich'aak K'ahk' of the Kaanu'l dynasty and who ruled Calakmul and the powerful Kaan kingdom with the royal title of k’uhul Kaan ajaw (sacred lord of Kaan) between the years 686 to 697 AD after the death of his father Yuknoom Ch’een II (Yuknoom the Great). The tomb is a great example of Maya funerary art and sacred architecture of the Maya elites of the Classic period. It was built following the mythological concept of the sacred cave, the place of origin of the ancestors from where the ruler's journey through the underworld would begin after his death. The great funerary burial and grave goods of Yuknoom Yich’aak K’ahk’ symbolize his power and wealth, and each object placed in the tomb represents the great complexity of the funerary ritual of the Maya nobility. His body was placed on a wooden platform covered with stucco painted with four-petaled flowers and was wrapped in a burial shroud made of cloth with a large amount of jade and shell jewelry on top, such as necklaces, bracelets, ear ornaments, pectorals, and on his shoulder a funerary jade mask with an inscription indicating it as the image of his father Yuknoom Ch'een II as a way of reaffirming his lineage, in addition of a large funerary headdress made of jade and palm with a figure of the god K'awiil, a jaguar claw and a snake head. His funerary offerings included 14 fine ceramic pieces from the Calakmul workshops, including several bowls and vessels with inscriptions, a polychrome plate decorated with the image of the god Sak Hu’un with a dedicatory text indicating it as property of Yuknoom Yich'aak K'ahk' and a codex style vessel painted with a representation of Itzamnaah.

Funerary offering from the tomb of Yuknoom Yich'aak K'ahk' (Tomb 4)

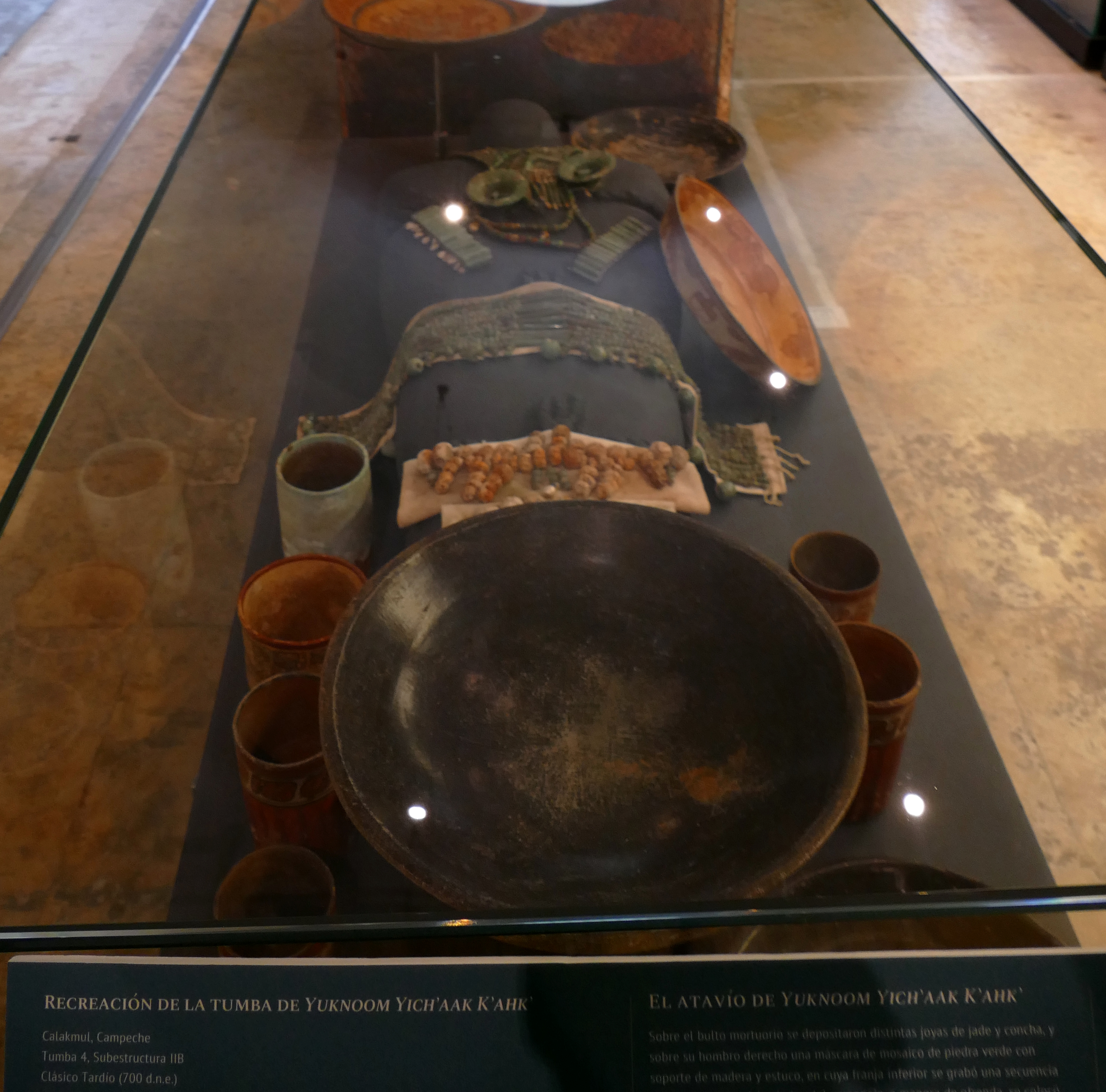
Reconstruction of the tomb of Yuknoom Yich'aak K'ahk'

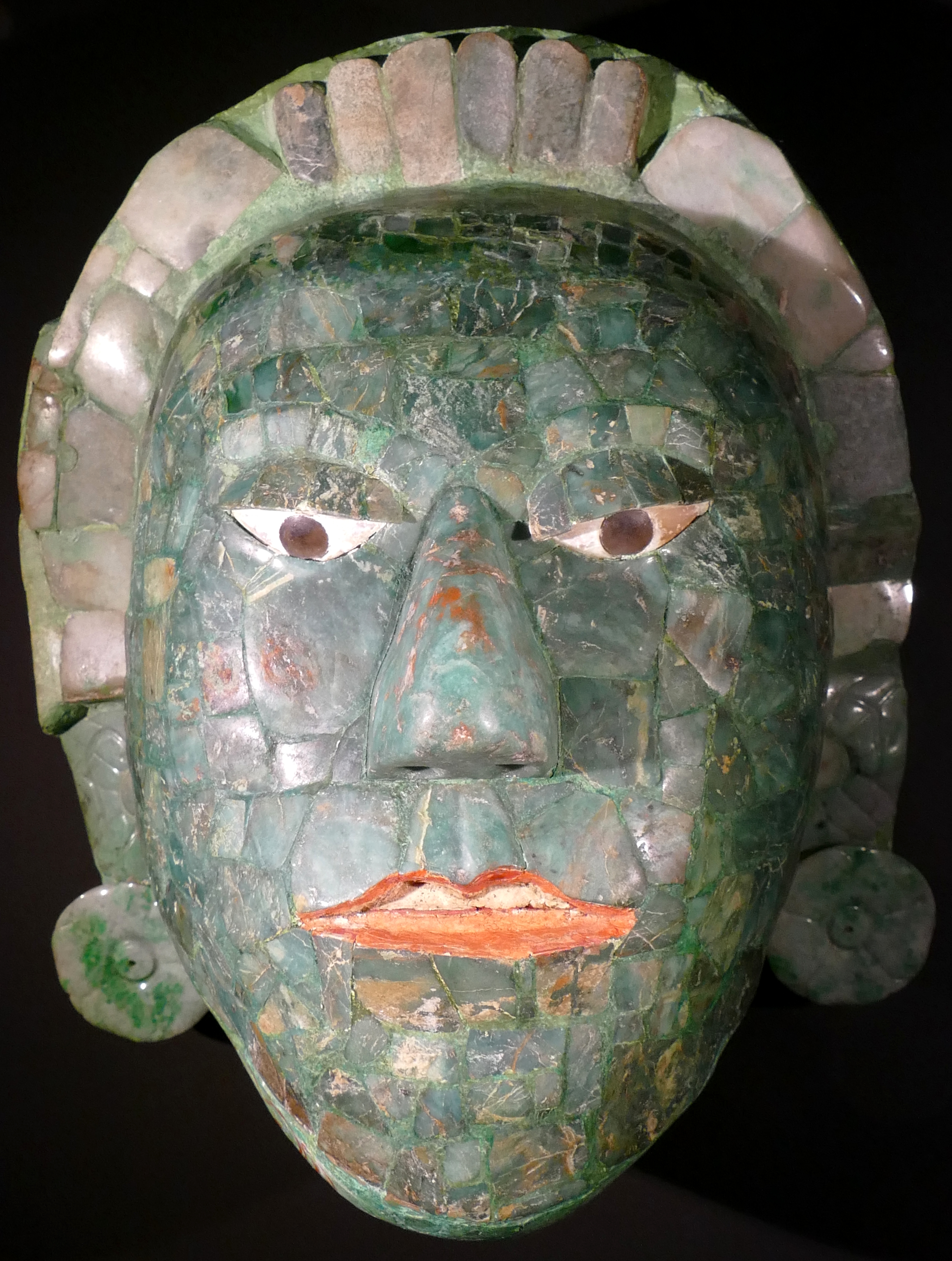
Funerary jade mask, contains an inscription that identifies it as the image of Yuknoom Ch'een II

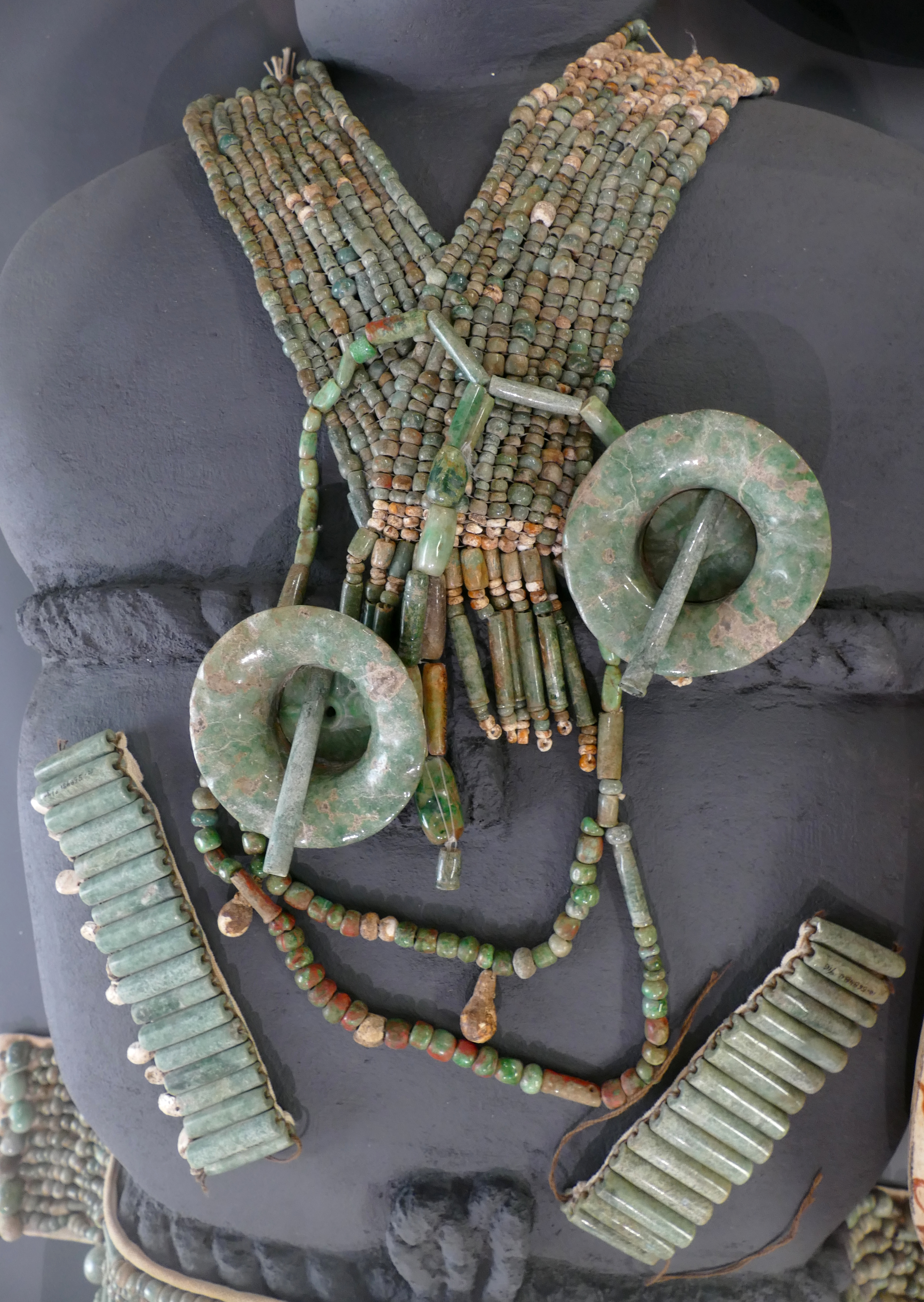
Jade necklaces, bracelets and earrings
