= Yuknoom Yichʼaak Kʼahkʼ =

7th-century king of the Mayan kingdom of Kaan

- Ajaw
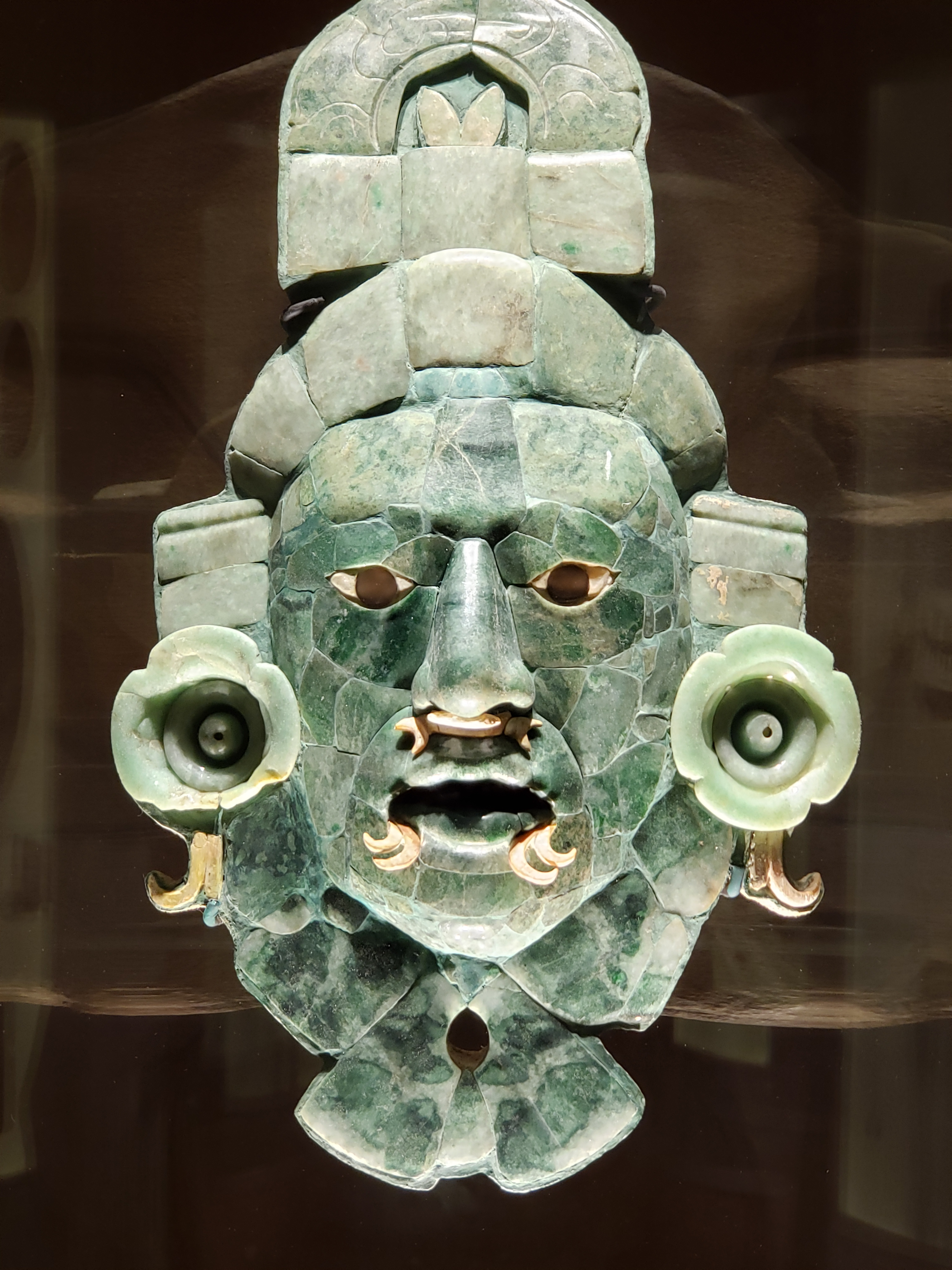
- Funerary jade mask of Yuknoom Yichʼaak Kʼahkʼ

King of Calakmul
- Reign: 4 April 686 - 15 December 697
- Predecessor: Yuknoom Ch'een II
- Successor: Yuknoom Tookʼ Kʼawiil
- Born: 6 October 649; Calakmul
- Died: 15 December 697 (aged 48); Calakmul
- Burial: Tomb 4, Structure II of Calakmul
- Issue: Yuknoom Tookʼ Kʼawiil, King of Calakmul
- House: Snake dynasty
- Father: Yuknoom Ch'een II
- Religion: Maya religion

Yuknoom Yichʼaak Kʼahkʼ (/jʌkˈnoʊm jɪˈʒɑːk ˈkɑːk/) or Yuknoom Ixquiac (lit. 'Jaguar Paw Smoke'; October 6, 649 – December 15, 697) was a Maya king of the Kaan kingdom, which had its capital at Calakmul during the Classic Period of Mesoamerican chronology.

== Reign ==
This king acceded in his thirty-sixth year, but there are indications that he may have effectively governed the kingdom for a substantial period before this on behalf of the previous king, Yuknoom the Great. The latter, who may have been Yuknoom Yichʼaak Kʼahk's father, lived well into his eighties and may have been incapacitated in his later years.

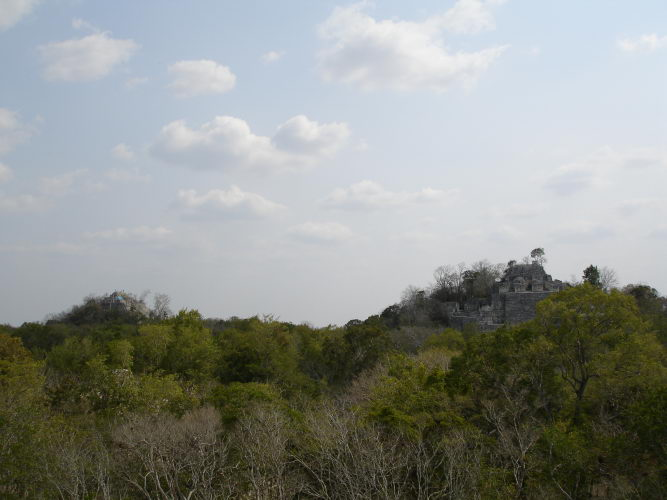
Calakmul, city of Yuknoom Yichʼaak Kʼahkʼ

The inscription of Stela 9, from 662, goes into great detail about the birth of Yuknoom Yichʼaak Kʼahkʼ and accords him a full royal title; thus military victories in the following years, as well as successful assertions of Kaan's hegemony, might tentatively be ascribed to Yichʼaak Kʼahkʼ. These include military triumphs over Tikal in 677 and (quite probably) 679; supervision of the accessions of kings of Moral and Cancuen in 662 and 677 respectively; the dispatching of Lady Six Sky from Dos Pilas to re-seed the dynasty of Naranjo in 682, and a lieutenant's action expressive of Kaan overlordship at Piedras Negras in 685.

Yichʼaak Kʼahk's accession was recorded at El Perú by local ruler Kʼinich Bahlam and at Dos Pilas by Bʼalaj Chan Kʼawiil. At Naranjo, the son of Lady Six Sky, Kʼakʼ Tiliw Chan Chaak, acceded in 693.

In 695 Calakmul suffered a military defeat at the hands of Tikal and it was believed that the king was killed or captured in that battle. A stucco scene at Tikal shows a prisoner being "adorned" for sacrifice and names the Kaan king in a related caption; the text is damaged and in its current condition it allowed for the possibility that it referred to Yichʼaak Kʼahkʼ himself instead of him being the overlord of the prisoner to be killed. A new find at La Corona has revealed that the king survived at least until 696, when he made a visit to that town. There are reasons to believe that Yichʼaak Kʼahkʼ is buried in Tomb 4 within Structure II of Calakmul.

Yichʼaak Kʼahk's monument program does not even begin to compare with that of his immediate predecessor, and the two stelae that still stand (including Stela 105 from 692) are located far from the site core in the Northeast Group.
