= Yuknoom Tookʼ Kʼawiil =

- Ajaw
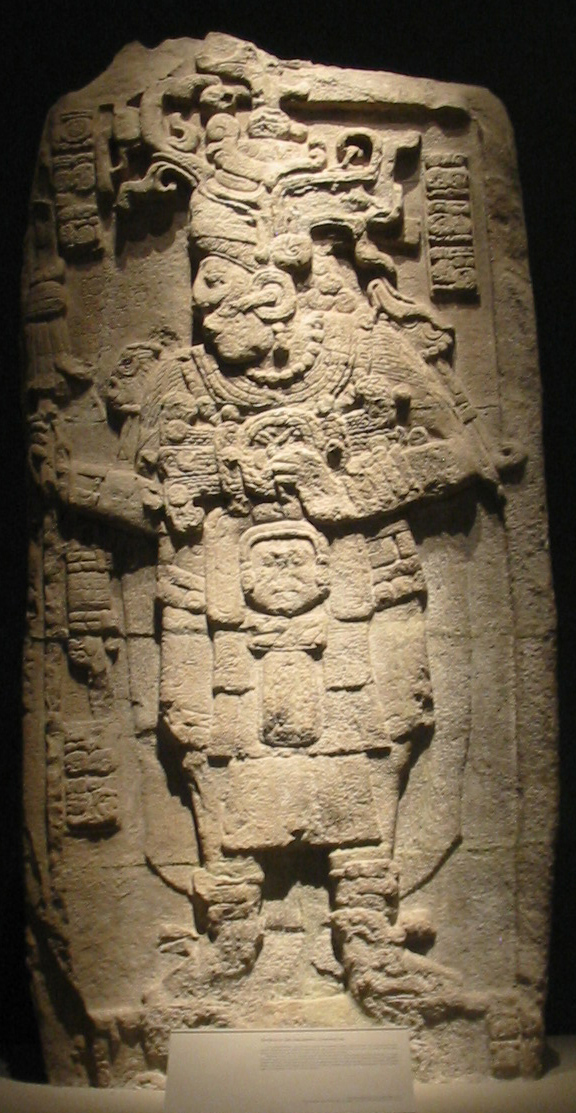
- Yuknoom Tookʼ Kʼawiil's portrait on Stela 51, dated to 731

King of Calakmul
- Reign: 31 March 698-736
- Predecessor: Yuknoom Yichʼaak Kʼahkʼ
- Successor: Wamaw Kʼawiil
- Born: Calakmul
- Died: 736; Calakmul
- Burial: Calakmul
- Spouse: Lady of Stela 54
- Issue: Lady Tiʼ Kaan, Queen of La Corona; Wamaw Kʼawiil (possibly); Lady Eveningstar, Queen of Yaxchilán (possibly)
- House: Snake dynasty
- Father: Yuknoom Yichʼaak Kʼahkʼ
- Religion: Maya religion

Yuknoom Tookʼ Kʼawiil (reigned 3 April 698-731>) was a Maya ruler of the Kaan kingdom (Calakmul).

== Reign ==
Yuknoom Tookʼ Kʼawiil erected many stelae to celebrate the 9.13.10.0.0 period ending of 702. Although activity within the site is not necessarily an indicator of the strength of external relations, in the same year a variant of Tookʼ Kʼawiil's name appears in a text at Dos Pilas (in external references including this one, he is called "Scroll-head Kʼawiil", one of a confusing series of alternatives and abbreviations for this king in the glyphic record). This suggests that Calakmul's sphere of influence had at least to some extent survived the Tikal victory or recovered from it.

El Peru, as well, is known to have remained a vassal, with Tookʼ Kʼawiil supervising the accession of a new ruler of that site at some unknown date; and the continuing loyalty of Naranjo is suggested by the fact that as late as 711, a king there is still professing his allegiance to the late Yuknoom Yichʼaak Kʼahkʼ.

The 9.15.0.0.0 kʼatun ending in 731 saw an even more impressive spate of monument erection by Yuknoom Tookʼ Kʼawiil; before looters sawed off their faces in the 1960s, the stelae erected at the base of Structure 1 were the finest surviving sculptures from Calakmul. The magnificent Stela 51, a depiction of Yuknoom, survives in the National Museum of Anthropology in Mexico City.

The inference that Calakmul had fully recovered its bygone vitality, however, is belied by an altar at Tikal showing a bound Calakmul prisoner; this dates to between 733 and 736 and is paired with a stela bearing the latter date. Yuknoom Tookʼ Kʼawiil may be named in the damaged caption, and Wamaw Kʼawiil is known to have replaced him on the throne in 736.

== Family ==
Wife of Yuknoom Tookʼ Kʼawiil was possibly Lady of Stela 54.

Lady Tiʼ Kaan, daughter of Yuknoom Tookʼ Kʼawiil married Yajaw Te' K'inich, lord of La Corona in 721.
