= Wamaw Kʼawiil =

- Ajaw

King of Calakmul
- Reign: c.736
- Predecessor: Yuknoom Tookʼ Kʼawiil
- Successor: Bolon K'awiil I
- Born: Calakmul
- Died: Calakmul
- Burial: Calakmul
- Issue: Bolon K'awiil I (possibly)
- House: Snake dynasty
- Father: Yuknoom Tookʼ Kʼawiil
- Religion: Maya religion

Wamaw Kʼawiil was an 8th century Maya ruler of Kaan (Calakmul).

Judging by the marked reduction in explicit statements of overlordship and foreign mentions of any sort, Calakmul's vanquishment at the hands of Tikal in AD 695 had lasting effects on its sphere of influence. Kaan still retained something of the far-ranging expansionistic impulse that had seen it assert hegemony over kingdoms as far afield as Moral-Reforma in the west and Dos Pilas in the south in the years before 695. For the king of Chiik Nahbʼ (Calakmul) is named on a monument in Quiriguá even further to the south and east in 736. The Kaan lord's name is difficult to read, but may be wa?-ma?-wi-KʼAWI꞉L, Wamaw Kʼawiil.

In 2007 a new inscription featuring Wamaw Kʼawiil was brought to light. A small panel in a private collection names the king, accords him the Snake emblem glyph, and depicts him playing ball with the king of Hix Witz — suggesting that Calakmul retained at least part of its network of subordinate sites in the years after the second Tikal defeat of c. 736.
