= Calakmul Ruler Y =

Maya king of Calakmul

Bolon Kʼawiil I
- Ajaw

King of Calakmul
- Reign: c.736
- Predecessor: Wamaw Kʼawiil
- Successor: Great Serpent
- Born: Calakmul
- Died: Calakmul
- Burial: Calakmul
- House: Snake dynasty
- Father: Wamaw Kʼawiil
- Religion: Maya religion

Ruler Y was a Maya king of Calakmul. He is also known as Ruler 8 and Bolon K'awiil I. He reigned around the year 736.

His monuments are stelae 25, 26, 27, 59 and 60.

It is possible that this king ordered in AD 741 the erection of five imposing stelae at Calakmul, but damage to the glyphs precludes reading of the commissioning ruler's name, and it is possible that they are actually commissions of Wamaw Kʼawiil (possible father of Ruler Y).

It was around this very time that Tikal consolidated its victories over Calakmul by Jasaw Chan Kʼawiil (695) and Yikʼin Chan Kʼawiil (c. 736); the latter’s triumphs over El Peru in 743 and Naranjo in 744 effectively spelled the end of hegemony of Calakmul.
