= Maya ceramics =

Pre-Columbian pottery

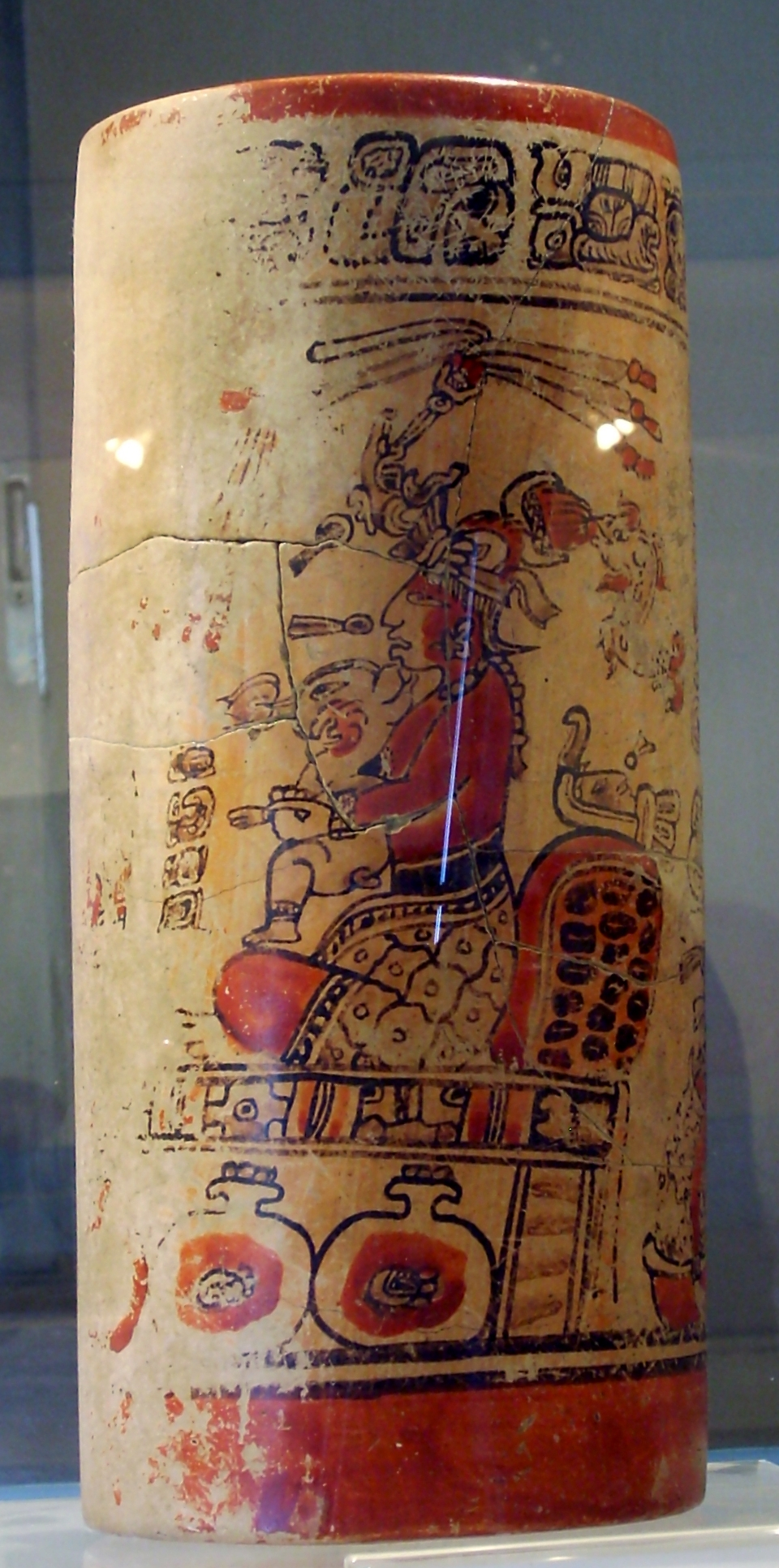
Painted Classic Period vase from Sacul in Guatemala

Maya ceramics are ceramics produced in the Pre-Columbian Maya culture of Mesoamerica. The vessels used different colors, sizes, and had varied purposes. Vessels for the elite could be painted with very detailed scenes, while utilitarian vessels were undecorated or much simpler. Elite pottery, usually in the form of straight-sided beakers called "vases", used for drinking, was placed in burials, giving a number of survivals in good condition. Individual examples include the Princeton Vase and the Fenton Vase.

Used for a plethora of daily activities, such as the storage of food and beverages, ceramics were also a canvas of commemoration. There were three main types of ceramics used in daily life: bowls, plates, and cylinders. They were often monochrome, meaning that only one type of mineral slip was used. Polychrome pottery was more complex in nature and therefore more commonly used by the elite. Not only was polychrome pottery used as decoration, it was also used as a form of social currency—a physical display of status and others' approval. Many high-status ceramics have been interpreted as evidence of political interaction among Maya sites, reflecting patterns of alliance, subordination, and shifting regional power dynamics. In some cases, high-status vessels were ritually broken and deposited within the architectural cores of major structures, in contexts associated with rebuilding and expansion activities.

As time progressed, various features were added to ceramics to go beyond the fundamental needs of vessels; For example, pellets were put in larger bowls to not only serve as something to hold food, but would also become instruments used in the same feasts.

Archaeological evidence has been found that suggests ceramics were used for industrial purposes. The discovery of highly uniform ceramic cylinders along with tools used in the production of salt indicate that the ceramics were used to mass-produce salt from brine.

Surveys of Maya ceramics are a major part of the ongoing controversy over the degree of elite political control over aspects the subsistence economy, the extent of economic centralization, and how it reinforces power (a common debate in the archaeology of complex societies).

== Typology ==
As defined and used by Southwestern archaeologists, a ware is "a large grouping of pottery types which has little temporal or spatial implication but consists of stylistically varied types that are similar technologically and in method of manufacture", and "a defined ware is a ceramic assemblage in which all attributes of paste composition (with the possible exception of temper) and of surface finish remain constant." Generally each pottery classification and terminology system then becomes rather specific to a particular archaeological site and/or period.

A classification system can be epistemologically useful:

What does a ceramic system “mean”? Most obviously, it means that Postclassic Petén potters recognized and adhered to a decorative canon—a set of rules—for design structure, layout, and colors. Vessel forms and proportions varied from ware to ware and settlement to settlement, but the principles that structured what kinds of decoration were to be applied, and where and how, were strictly adhered to in at least three production resource-groups (minimally defined by paste compositions) throughout the lakes area (approximately seventy-five kilometers east–west) over three hundred years. In addition, we were eventually able to successfully predict the decorative types we would find (which would otherwise be a process of categorization) in each ceramic group.

A type-variety classification system's criticisms include that it leaves a lot of variability unaccounted for, it should be accompanied by modal analysis, and it has limited use with whole vessels.

=== Petén Lakes Postclassic system ===
"Postclassic slipped and decorated pottery at sites in the Petén Lakes region was manufactured of three distinctive paste wares. These indicate minimally three production nodes of Petén Postclassic pottery, at least one for each paste. ... These paste wares were used to manufacture the three most common red-slipped ceramic groups of the Postclassic.... [P]otters across the Petén Lakes area had a fairly uniform and widely shared set of ideas about what constituted proper pottery decoration regardless of their different clay and temper resources."

- Vitzil Orange-red Ware: coarse red-orange carbonate; used to manufacture Augustine ware.
- Snail-Inclusion Paste Ware: silty gray-to-brown with snail inclusions; used to manufacture Paxcamán ware.
- Clemencia Cream Paste Ware: marly “white” or cream; used to manufacture Topoxté ware.

"Whether painted or incised, decoration appeared in circumferential bands on the interior walls of tripod dishes (Rice 1983, 1985, 1989). The bands are defined above and below by multiple lines and divided into two or four panels by vertical lines or placement of simple motifs, which also may appear inside the panels (see Rice and Cecil 2009). This decorative coherence structures the classificatory coherence of types and varieties in the slipped ceramic groups across the three paste wares: monochrome, black-painted, red-painted, and incised."

=== Chocholá style ===
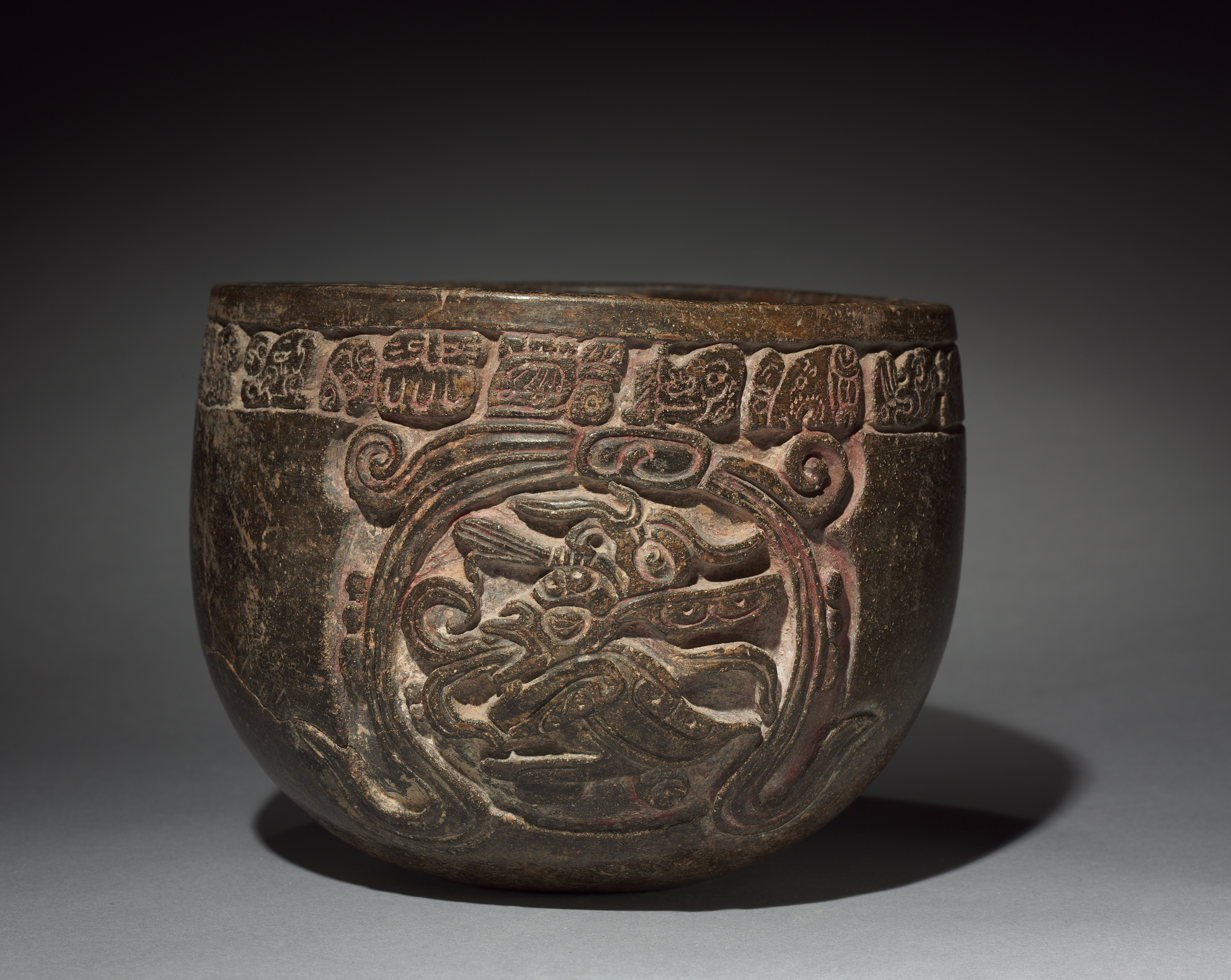
A firefly, among the most common of insects in Maya art, is carved on both sides of this vessel. The text on the rim mentions a young man, suggesting this vessel was involved in a rite-of-passage ceremony.

Northern Yucatán; as they did not come directly from digs they are often "labeled as 'unprovenanced' and hence 'unusable'. ... In 1973, the name Chocholá was first assigned to the waxy, chocolatey, bowls and cylinders, which due to their uniquely carved surfaces, stand out from the majority of ancient Maya ceramics. ... Coe named the style after a small village 30 kilometers southwest of Mérida, near the larger settlement of Maxcanu, from which he was told the ceramics originated"

"On a significant number of Chocholá pots the decorative information is restricted to hieroglyphics, either the diagonal band described above, or a more elaborate combination of diagonal glyph bands, rim texts, or a single large Calendar Round date." The Primary Standard Sequences are text that occurs usually as a rim text on many ceramic vessels from all parts of the Maya Lowlands. The PSS is a glyphic formula that refers to the dedication of a vessel, its method of adornment, the class of vessel involved, its use and content (cacao drinks and maize gruels), and sometimes the owner or artisan.

=== Monte Albán typology ===
A ceramic classification by paste color and texture first defined in Caso et al. 1967 is commonly used: gris (gray, abbreviated "G"), crema (cream, abbreviated "C"), café (brown, abbreviated "K"), and amarillo (yellow or orange, abbreviated "A"). "Most ceramic types produced after the founding of Monte Albán are designated by an alphanumeric code indicating their ware and type number (e.g., G.12, C.11, K.17, A.9). In contrast, ceramic types dating to pre-Monte Albán phases generally have descriptive names (e.g., Socorro Fine Gray, Atoyac Yellow-White). Although Oaxaca archaeologists do not formally assign these types to the four ware categories defined by Caso et al. (1967), similar gray, brown, and buff/cream pastes were used by earlier (Middle Formative) potters, and several pre-Monte Albán types clearly were "ancestral" to particular types in the Monte Albán sequence (e.g., Drennan, 1976: 22; also Flannery and Marcus, 2005: 473; 2015: 115–116)."

==== Crema ware (cream) ====
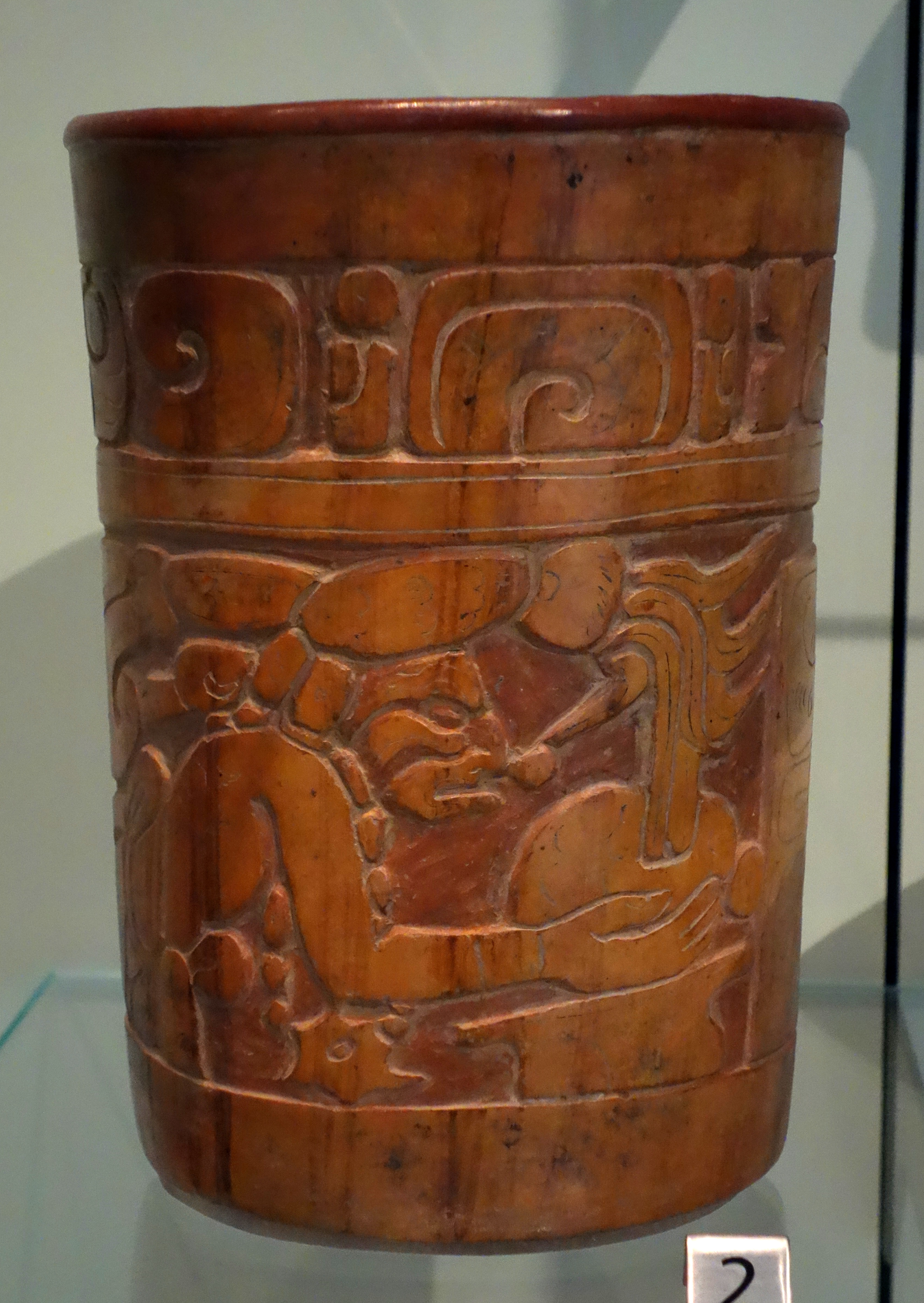
Creamware vessel featuring the Smoking Xul glyph, Maya, Alta Verapaz region, Guatemala, Late Classic Period, Royal Ontario Museum.

Designs could be incised or carved post-firing. "In the Rosario phase and Early MA I, production loci generally produced both “costly” and utilitarian vessels. By Late MA I, the production of costly vessels was dominated by potters in the Cacaotepec-Atzompa locality northwest of Monte Albán, who specialized in the manufacture of elaborate cream ware (crema) vessels, while other communities produced primarily (though not exclusively) utilitarian vessels. We suspect that these patterns reflect the efforts of rulers at Monte Albán to control the production and distribution of elite pottery, particularly crema vessels." "Many other sites in which crema-ware ceramics were found were interpreted to have had close ties to Monte Albán, because these ceramics were only produced from clay sources located near the ancient city." The distribution of crema ware in combination with other archaeological evidence suggests "efforts by the leaders of Monte Albán to control, perhaps because of trade, the valleys lying between the Valley of Oaxaca and the coast."

=== Slate ware ===
characterized by its waxy and lustrous surface finishing, Late Classic to Early Postciassic in northwestern Yucatán peninsula. one of the most sophisticated ceramic traditions of Northern Yucatán, and encompasses a multitude of elite wares.

=== Gralisa ware ===
"A distinctive incised and graphite-painted red ware pottery known only from Bajos de Chila and four other sites on Oaxaca’s central coast." Their great abundance and variety in Bajos de Chila and the Guatemala highlands have suggested a possible greater extent of Maya trade and influence, but Oaxaca coast excavations have been limited.

=== Chocolate pots ===
Spouted vessels of the Middle Preclassic (1000–400 B. C.) and Late Preclassic (400 B. C.-A. D. 250) Maya are traditionally called "chocolate pots", but lacked direct evidence that they had use in association with cacao until recently.

=== Unique styles ===
Stamped or mould-made pottery are generally rare among Maya ceramics.

== Decoration ==
The utilitarians ware of the common people usually had simple decoration that reflected its use. Vessels in the palace were more elaborately decorated by carved forms or highly skilled polychrome paintings with hieroglyphs which named their function, the patron and rarely, the artist signature. For example, cylindrical bowls used for cacao drinks often had the plant species Q. guatemalteca depicted on them because that flower was used to enhance the flavor of the cacao drink. Designs often included rituals, supernatural figures or common day practices. Rulers were often depicted next to deities and shown to be equal, or nearly equal, in power and status as them. Other pots functioned more as storytelling devices, with glyphs from the Maya script that likely were guides for songs or other ritualistic texts.

For many potters, decoration and imagery was more important than the structure of each vessel. Cylindrical vases and plates were popular because they maximized the surface area for storytelling through imagery on each piece. There was more evolution in pictorial representations than shapes. As the complexity of painting increased, vessel shapes remained fairly simple. Different regions in Mesoamerica also featured different color schemes regarding the area. In Holmul the color scheme surrounded reds and oranges on a white background. Black backgrounds often indicate supernatural forces featured in the plate's scene or the depiction of the underworld because of the dark color used. Different regions also featured a variety of regional symbols depicted on pottery. In Tikal, the Tikal Dancer represents the young Maize God, often depicted with his arms outspread and one leg bent, and has been seen on eighty-two compiled plates. The Maize God was incredibly important to Maya culture because the god not only symbolized the Maya's main resource but rebirth as well. In the Popol Vuh, according to some, the Maize God is represented in a cyclical nature in order for the Maya to understand the human life cycle. By placing an important figure in Maya culture onto pieces of pottery, it provides a higher importance of the pottery itself and its purpose. The Holmul Dancer, although similar to the Tikal Dancer in positioning, features a male dancing with a small dwarf or hunchback figure off to one side and has been seen on forty-five compiled vessels. Although the decoration had a higher importance, structure was still taken in to account. Specific pieces often featured other characteristics such as rattle feet, hollow cylinders located on the bottom of the plate that hold a ball on the inside. The rattle feet were often used for ritual purposes in the form of music because when shaken, the plate rattles. Pieces created with a diameter over 0.3m were often used for ceremonial feasts and those with smaller diameters, often including jars, were used for storage.

== Ceramics in society ==
Maya ceramics are made from two main types of materials that relate to their social structure, limestone and volcanic ash. Most of the land around the Mayans was limestone, which is where calcite comes from. These were mainly made as gifts and given to make local alliances, and these vessels are found in a more localized area. Whereas the ones made from volcanic ash are more widespread because they were thought to be given as gifts from the upper class to make very large alliances, through the Maya trade systems.

Although the Maya are well known for creating a multitude of art, they are perhaps most well-known for their pottery. The Maya used these potteries to perform their sacrifice rituals with melodic tones. Because these rituals were a way of praying for rain, the blood spilled by the sacrificial victim (frequently a prisoner of war) was a form of asking their gods for rain and bounty in agriculture. Since these two components are connected, with rain, the Maya would have grown along with their agriculture.

Ceramics played a big role in society during the Maya Classic Period, when the Maya elite used ceramics not only to give gifts to foreign dignitaries, but they were also used in feasts during the Classic Period. Specialized pottery was made for the graves of nobles. Not anyone could make this pottery as it was very important they knew about the Maya history, mythology, and more. On these ceramics, intricate scenes were depicted which showed the palace life of the elite. The decorative scenes needed to feature the elite because they were the primary customers and wanted to have artwork that featured themselves. On each ceramic piece near the rim, its contents would be listed out, a type of beverage for a vase or food for a plate, then who it belonged to was written next. The rim also may feature Saurian head labels which may indicate a specific location where the piece was made or where the scene on the piece took place. Since these ceramics were traded and gifted, many end up in differing environments. Such circulation often took place within elite contexts, with many polychrome vessels exchanged among courtly networks, even as some ceramics moved across regions through broader trade systems. In Teotihuacan, many ceramics from Tikal have been found due to being traded between traveling merchants between different cities in Mesoamerica. Specialists mainly pay attention to the writing, drawings, and hieroglyphs, since they were different for the different people and cultures they were made by. As for the everyday use more simple ware was made, generally of only one color, and would be produced in large quantities for the general public use. Maya pottery only weakly correlates to socio-economic levels of Maya society because of the value the culture emphasized ceramics. Rituals were where the Maya registered status rather than in pottery.

== Economics ==
There is evidence in Postclassic Oaxaca that there was significant local production and trade of ceramics independent of the markets at the region imperial capital of Tututepec.

== Production techniques ==
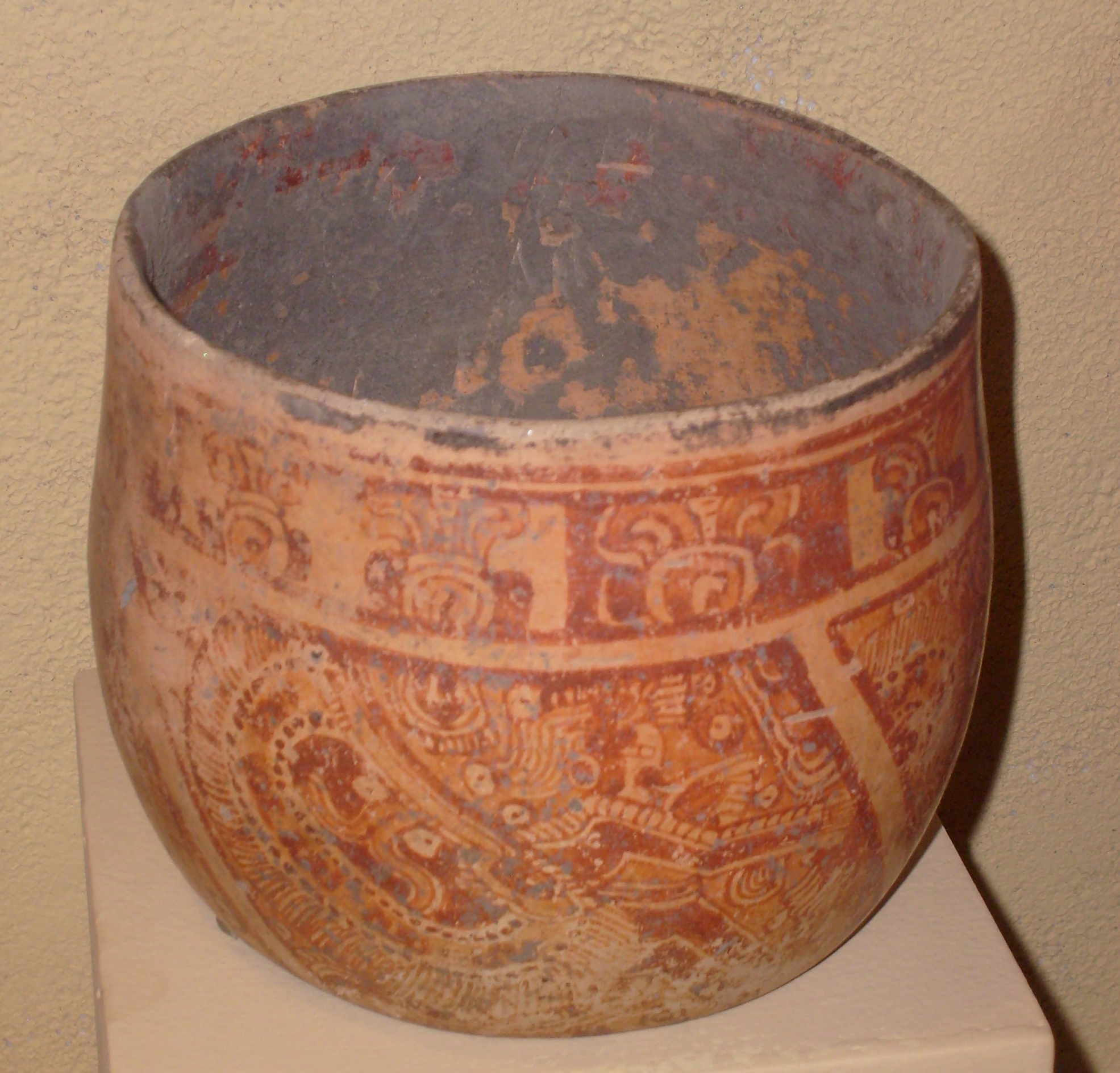
Maya vase depicting a costumed noble; burial offering. Late classical period (600-900 CE). Copán, Honduras.

The Maya had specific techniques to create, inscribe, paint, and design pottery. To begin creating a ceramic vessel the Maya had to locate the proper resources for clay and temper. The present-day indigenous Maya, who currently live in Guatemala, Belize and southern Mexico still create wonderful ceramics. Prudence M. Rice provides a look at what the current Guatemalan Maya use today for clay. Highland Guatemala has a rich geological history comprised mainly from a volcanic past. The metamorphic and igneous rock, as well as the sand and ash from the pumice areas provide many types of tempering. In the area, there are a range of clays that create varied colors and strengths when fired. Today's Maya locate their clays in the exposed river systems of the highland valleys. It is hypothesized that the ancient people obtained their clay by the same method as today's Maya. The clays are located in exposed river systems of the highland valleys. Most likely, due to the climatic similarities over the last millennia it is likely that these same deposits or similar ones could have been used in early times.

Once the clay and temper were collected, pottery creation began. The maker would take the clay and mix it with the temper (the rock pieces, ash, or sand). Temper served as a strengthening device for the pottery. Once worked into a proper consistency, the shape of the piece was created.

A potter's wheel was not used in creating this pottery. Instead, they used coil and slab techniques. The coil method most likely involved the formation of clay into long coiled pieces that were wound into a vessel. The coils were then smoothed together to create walls. The slab method used square slabs of clay to create boxes or types of additions like feet or lids for vessels. Once the pot was formed into the shape, then it would have been set to dry until it was leather hard. Then, the pot was painted, inscribed, or slipped. The last step was the firing of the vessel. Kilns were used to fire the vessels, and they were normally found outside in the open air. Unlike many modern kilns, they were fired by wood, charcoal, or even grass.

Like the Ancient Greeks, the Maya created clay slips from a mixture of clays and minerals. The clay slips were then used to decorate the pottery. By the fourth century, a broad range of colors including yellow, purple, red, and orange were being made. However, some Mayan painters refrained from using many colors and used only black, red, and occasionally cream. This series of ceramics is termed the "Codex Style", it being similar to the style of the Pre-Columbian books.

From the 5th century onwards, post-firing stucco was adopted from Teotihuacan. By preparing a thin quicklime, the Maya added mineral pigments that would dissolve and create rich blues and greens that added to their artistic culture. The original use of the Maya Blue that is so well known was for ritualistic purposes in pre-Columbian times by combining indigo, copal, and palygorskite to burn as incense which left a blue hue used for many other types of art later on in Maya history. Many times this post-fire stucco technique was mixed with painting and incising. Incising is carving deeply or lightly into partially dried clay to create fine detailed designs. This technique was mostly popular during the Early Classic Period.

== Development chronology ==
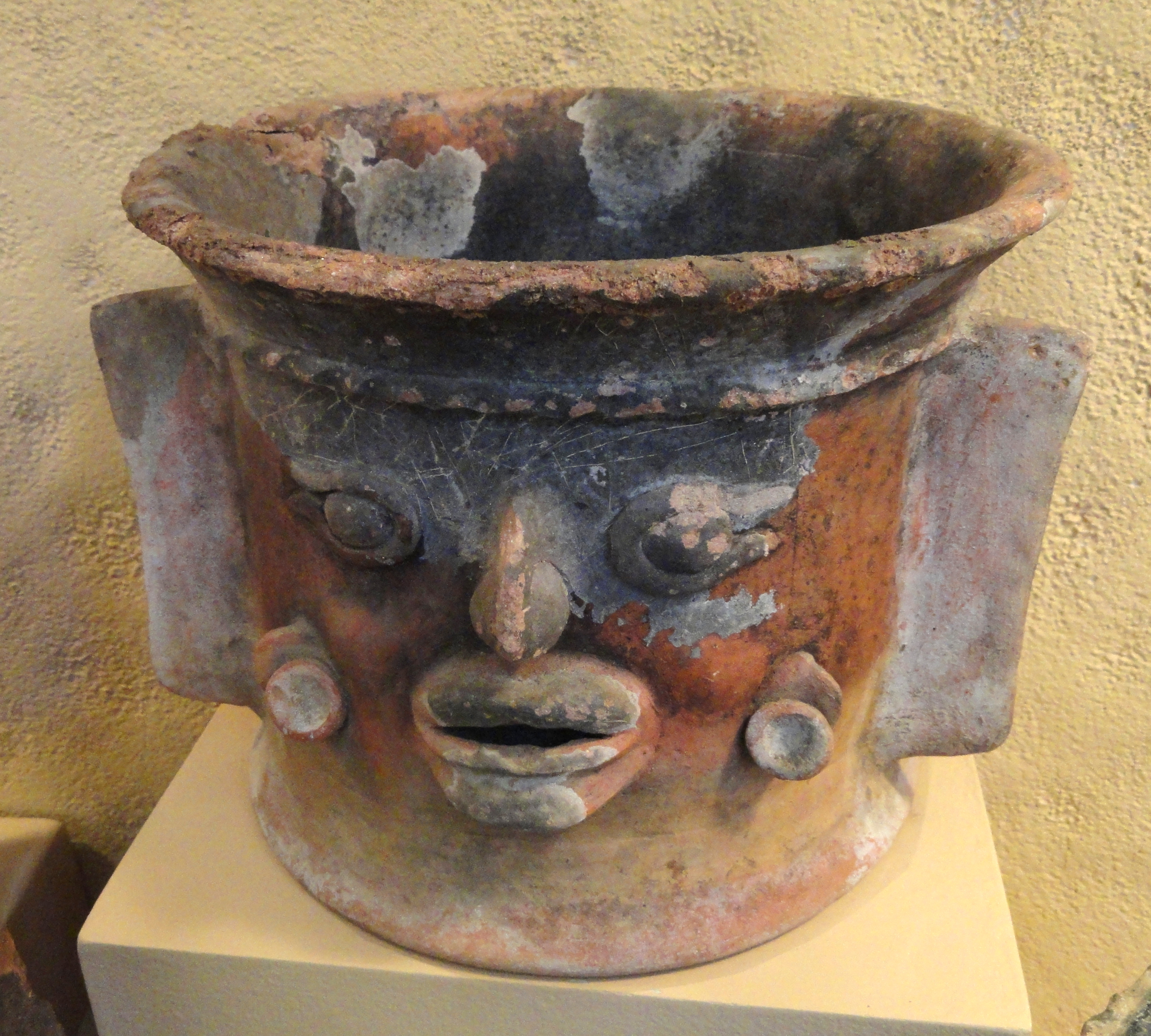
Incense Burner with face and side flanges, Classic Mayan, highland Guatemala, Museum of Us.

The Maya were a diverse people whose culture has developed through the centuries. As they developed, so did their pottery. Archaeologists have found stages of commonality between types of ceramics, and these phases coincide with the Mayan timeline.

Middle Preclassic (900/800-250 BC) Late Preclassic (250 BC- AD 250) Early Mayan ceramics stemmed from a past that began even years before the Maya became a group. Originally, the early Maya used gourds cut into useful shapes to create vessels to carry liquids and foodstuffs. These portable and durable gourds made excellent containers. The first ceramics closely resembled gourds and many were decorated with rocker stamps and simple slips. During the Late Preclassic period, many of the ceramics took on appendages of tetrapod mammiform supports. These supports were four legs underneath the pot holding it up. Tetrapods are relatively rare in the Maya Lowlands- even in the Peten where they were first described. Characteristic cream-on-red stripes colored these unique vessels.

The pottery of the Maya Early Classic dated from AD 250 to 550. The Maya soon began using polychrome slip paint, meaning they used many different colors to decorate the pots. This method of decoration became almost homogeneous for Mayan potters, thus signaling the beginning of the Classic Period. Across the Classic period, Maya pottery has little comparisons between its assemblages. Polychrome pottery was a luxury item not commonly available to the general population. Most Early Classic Ceramics were monochrome types. Figural Polychromes were an elite prerogative, probably produced by and for other elites. The Classic Period of the Maya provided beautiful ceramics in many forms. The lidded basal flange bowl was a new style of potter to add to the already growing repertoire. This type vessel usually had a knob on top in the form of an animal or human head, while the painted body of the animal or human spreads across the pot. Many of these pots also had mammiform supports, or legs. These unique vessels are usually found in great condition signaling a ritual function. The reason many are in good condition is their frequent use as burial goods. As such, they are often the target of looters who cut deep trenches through many Maya buildings in search of a marketable vessel.

== Sample timelines ==
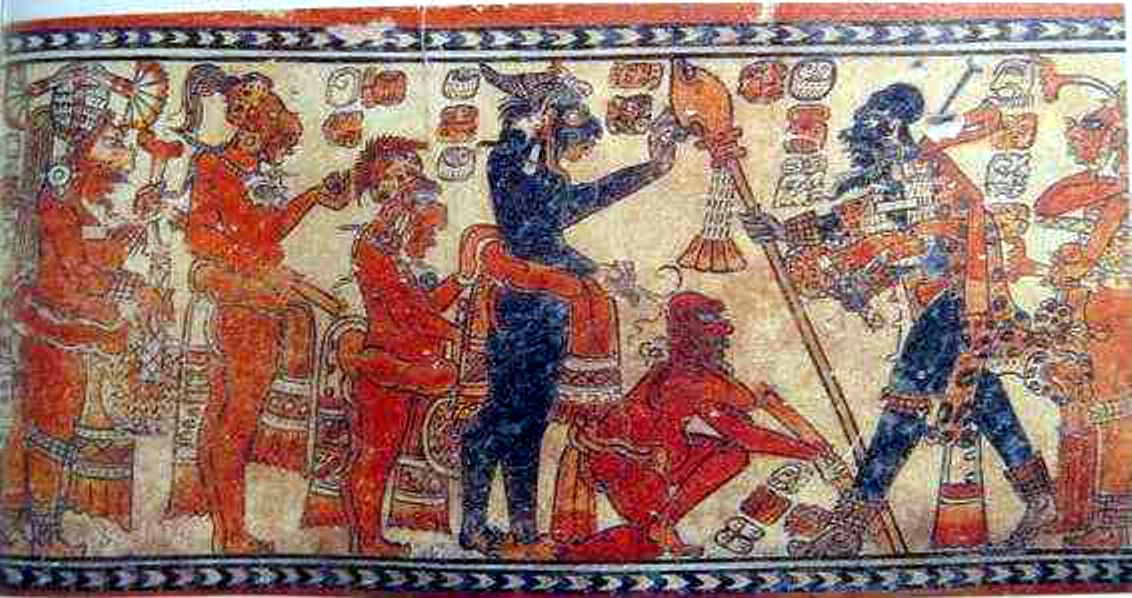
Chama Style Vessel.

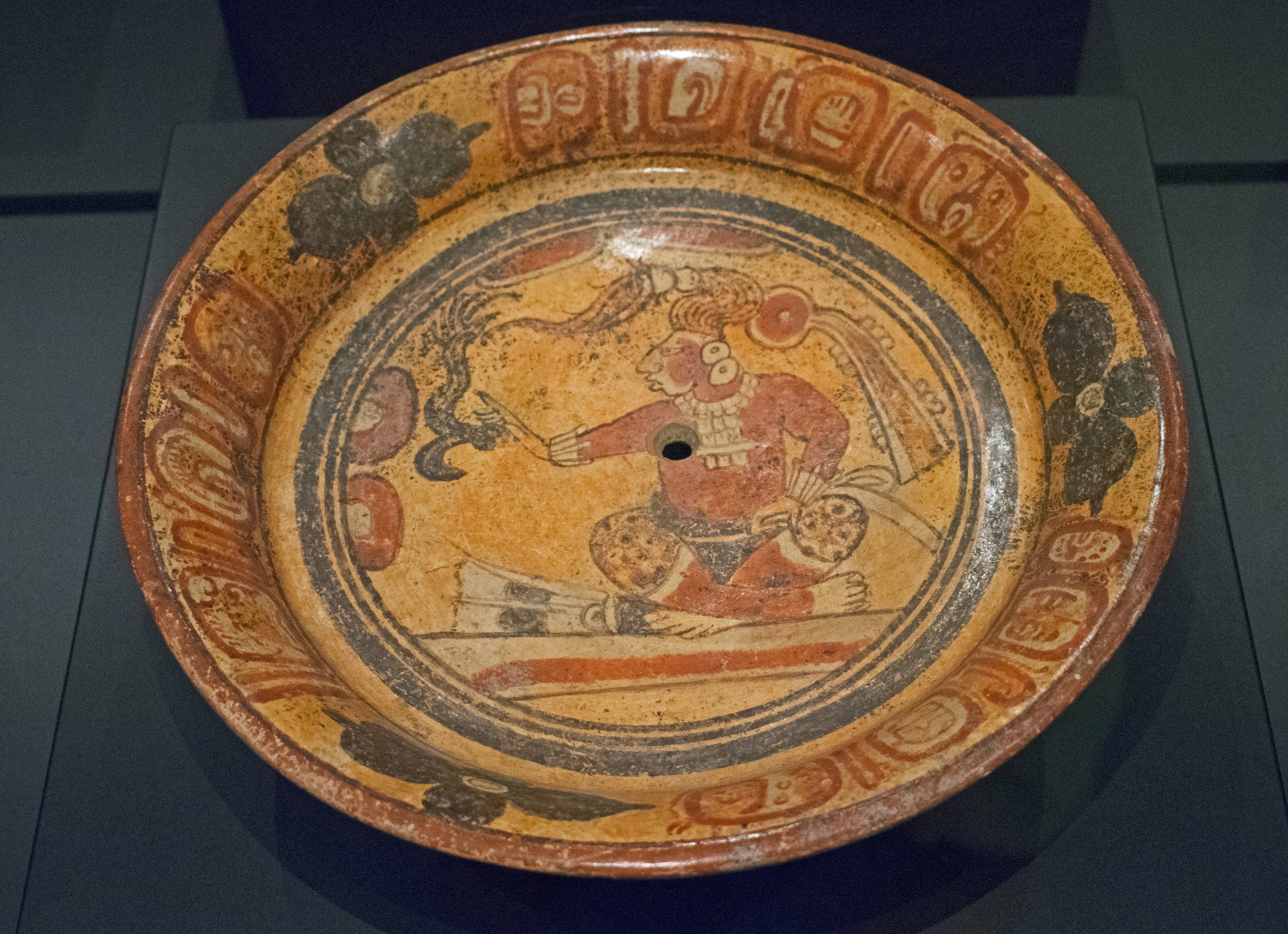
Tripod showing a lord seated on a throne. Fondacion La Ruta Maya, classic period (250 to 900).

There is no 'standard' timetable for Maya ceramics. There is significant variability in timing and content between sites. The first table below lists the ceramic complexes for Uaxactun (1955, modified, 2000), and may not apply to any other site.

Period	Ceramic Sphere	Approximate Date
Terminal Classic	Tepeu III	AD 850-?
Late Classic	Tepeu II	AD 700-850
Late Classic	Tepeu I	AD 550-700
Early Classic	Tzakol	AD 250-550
Late Preclassic	Chicanel	350 BC - AD 250
Middle Preclassic	Mamon	600-350 BC

Version of a Maya ceramic timetable, adapted from a tourist booklet for Chichen Itza, 1984, based on Valliant's work from 1927, and modified from Smith's 1955 work at Uaxactun. It is a mix of phases, types, and technology, and therefore of no indicative value.

Period	Ceramic Type	Approximate Date
Red Pottery	Period of Mexican Absorption	AD 1200-1540
Maya-Toltec or Mexican Period	Fine Orange	AD 975-1200
Interregnum or Transitional	Plumbate	AD 925-975
Classic	Tzakol and Tepeu	Collapse AD 800-925 Florescence AD 625-800 Early AD 325-625 Classic AD 325-925
Formative or Preclassical	Mamom and Chicanel	500 BC - AD 326
