= Codex Style =

Style of Ancient Maya art

The Codex Style is one of the most celebrated and recognizable styles of Ancient Maya art. It was first identified in 1973 by Michael Coe in the book The Maya Scribe and His World, in which the PSS (Primary Standard Sequence) was discovered. Coe called it “codex style” because he believed that the authors of the designs on the vessels were the same scribes who had painted or written the codices and that the paintings on the vessels imitated the images found within them.

The definition was later taken up by Robicsek and Hales in their book The Maya Book of Dead, the title of which reveals the assumption that the vases could deal with subjects such as the Book of the Dead of the Ancient Egyptians and Underworld themes. Several hypotheses have emerged about the origin of these ceramic typologies. After the discovery of the Codex Scribe Vessel 1 and of other “codex” style fragments in Nakbe it was thought that these vessels were produced by several workshops in the region of north-eastern Petén, Guatemala, namely the areas of Nakbe and El Mirador. Recent studies and findings have shown that codex-style pottery was also manufactured at the site of Calakmul in Campeche.

== Description of the Style ==
The Codex Style, as the name already clarifies, has a strong resemblance to the surviving Postclassic Maya codices. Comparing the scenes painted in the corpus of codex style vases, artistic devices such as the contrast of a black line on a white (or cream) background with the addition of a hieroglyphic caption illustrating the iconography recalled the uses of color and space in the Dresden Codex and the other three Postclassic handwritings.

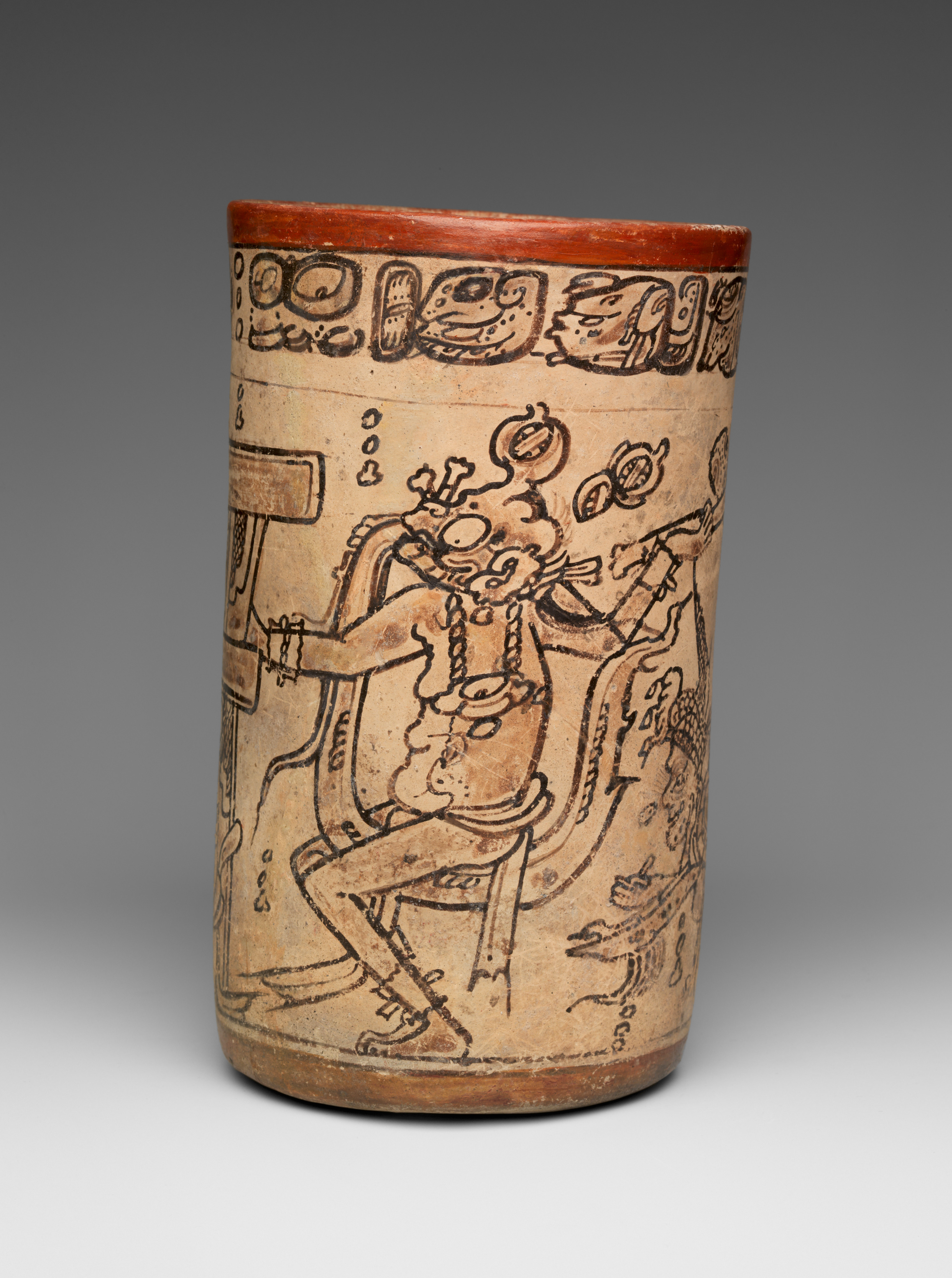
Codex-style vase with a mythological scene; 7th–8th century; ceramic. Height: 19 cm (7.5 in), diameter: 11.2 cm (4.4 in). Metropolitan Museum of Art.

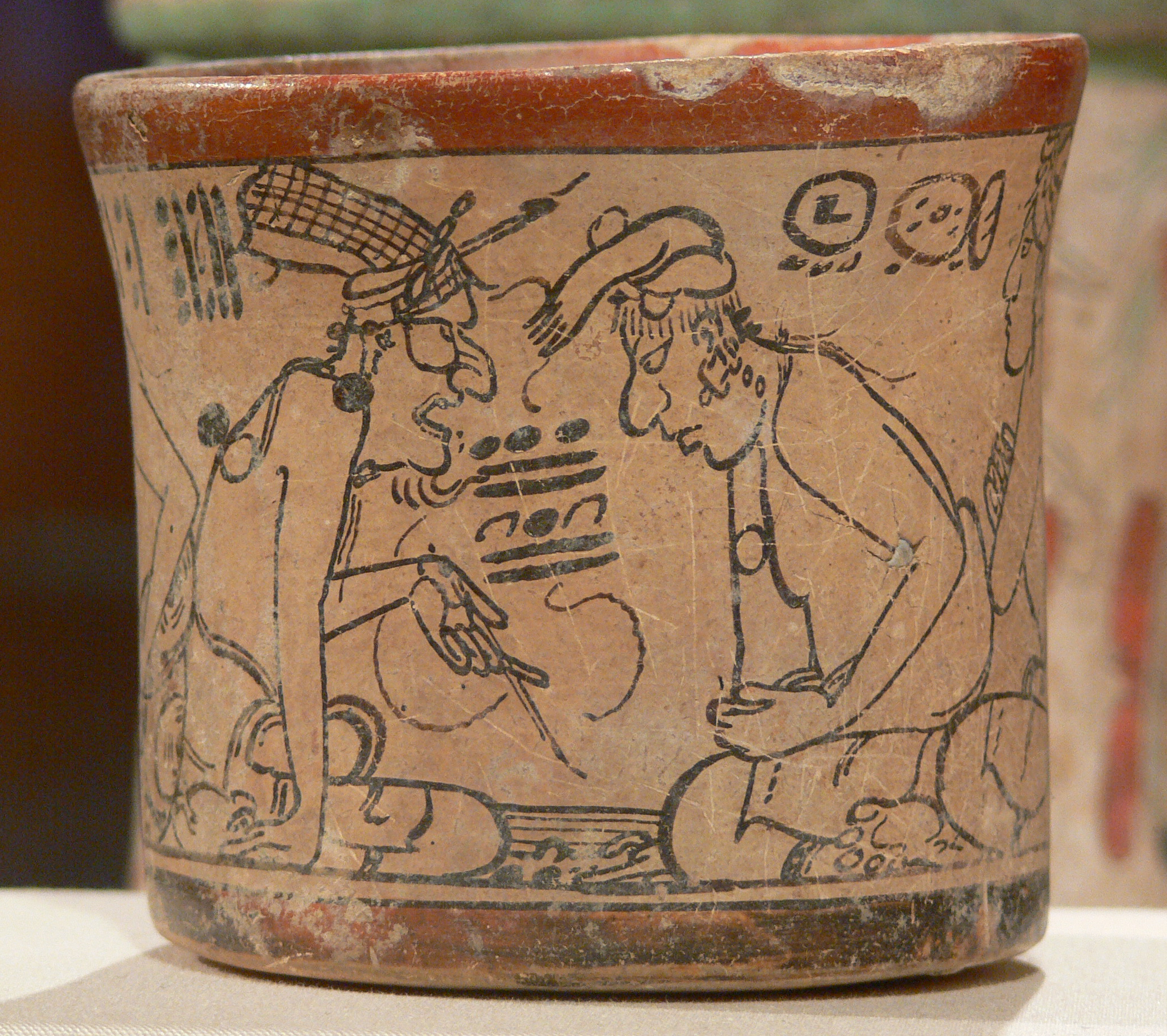
Vessel with a scene of the instruction of a scribe; c. 550-950 CE; ceramic. Height: 9.5 cm (3.74 in), diameter: 10.5 cm (4.13 in). Kimbell Art Museum.

== Bibliography ==
- Boucher, Sylviane, and Yoly Palomo, Discriminación visual como determinante de estilo y asignación tipológica de la cerámica códice de Calakmul, Campeche. Estudios de cultura maya 39: 99–132 2012.
- Coe, Michael D., The Maya Scribe and His World. New York: The Grolier Club 1973.
- Coe, Michael D., Lords of the Underworld; Masterpieces of Classic Maya Ceramics. New Jersey: Princeton University Press 1978.
- Coe, Michael D., and Justin Kerr, The Art of the Maya Scribe. Thames and Hudson 1997.
- Delvendahl, Kai, Calakmul in Sight: History and Archaeology of an Ancient Maya City. Unas Letras Industria Editorial 2008.
- Robicsek, Francis, and Donald Hales, The Maya Book of the Dead: The Corpus of Codex Style Ceramics of the Late Classic period. Norman: University of Oklahoma Press 1981.
