= Mask of Calakmul =

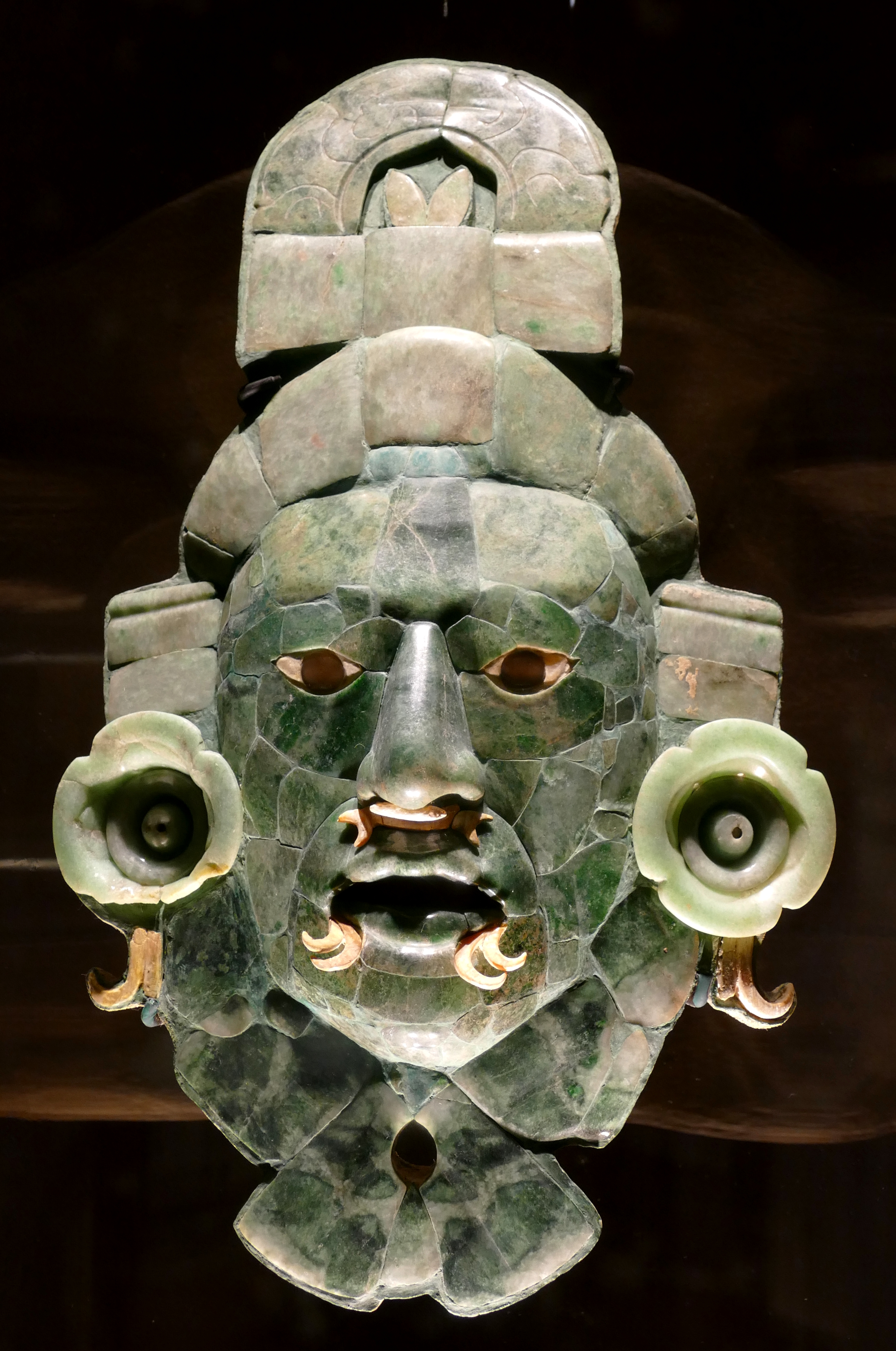
- Maya jade mask
- Material: Jade, white shell, obsidian
- Created: c. 660-750 AD
- Discovered: 1984
- Place: Tomb 1 of Structure VII, Calakmul, Mexico
- Present location: Museo de Arquitectura Maya Baluarte de la Soledad
- Period: Classic
- Culture: Maya

The Mask of Calakmul (Spanish: Máscara de Calakmul) is a jade mask considered a masterpiece of the Maya civilization, found in the ancient city of Calakmul, in the state of Campeche, Mexico.

== Overview ==
The mask was part of the funerary offering in Tomb 1 of Structure VII. It is a complex representation of the deified face of a ruler, made up of various iconographic elements from the Maya worldview and mythology that link him to sacred attributes. The mask was created between 660 and 750 AD in the late Classic period of the Maya civilization.

The Mask of Calakmul is composed of 57 jade tesserae with details of white shell and obsidian, materials that hold profound symbolic weight within the Maya mythology. The mask represents the divinized face of the ruler with an imposing countenance, looking straight ahead with obsidian eyes, his mouth open represents a sacred cave from which the ruler's vital force emerges; this exhalation is captured by a piece of white shell, symbolizing his passage into death.

The ruler wears a fine headdress representing the mythological concept of the sacred mountain (witz), featuring details alluding to the maize god and long jade ear ornaments in the shape of four-petaled flowers, referencing the structure of the sacred Maya cosmology, which was defined by four corners and a center connecting earthly space with the celestial realm and the underworld since the creation of the universe.

Below these are the fangs of a snake, an animal that, within Mayan mythology, had the ability to move through the three levels of the universe, as well as representing the power of the Kaanu'l (snake) lineage to which the ruler belonged. Below the face, a jade butterfly opens its wings as a symbol of the ruler's soul in motion, this represented the constant cycle and transformation of nature, mirroring the ruler's soul as it transcended into the sacred space.

It was first discovered in 1931 by American biologist Cyrus Longworth Lundell and remained safeguarded in Calakmul, but it was rediscovered by archeologists from the Autonomous University of Campeche and members of the National Institute of Anthropology and History in 12 December 1984. It was inside tomb 1 of structure VII of Calakmul as part of the rich funerary offerings of a ruler of the Kaanu'l dynasty. Since its discovery, it has become one of the most representative and emblematic works of Maya culture and Mesoamerican art, as well as one of the greatest pre-Columbian archaeological treasures in Mexico. It is currently on display at the Museo de Arquitectura Maya (Museum of Maya Architecture) Baluarte de la Soledad in the city of Campeche.

== Jade masks from Calakmul ==
The Mask of Calakmul is one of several jade masks that have been found within the city's structures; however, it stands out as the most complex and elaborate of them all. The placement of jade masks in royal burials, due to the sacred symbolism of jade to accompany the deceased on their journey through the underworld, was an important royal funerary tradition of the Kaanu'l dynasty that ruled in Calakmul from the 7th century onwards. These types of masks have also been found in abundance in the royal tombs of Dzibanche, the place of origin of this lineage.

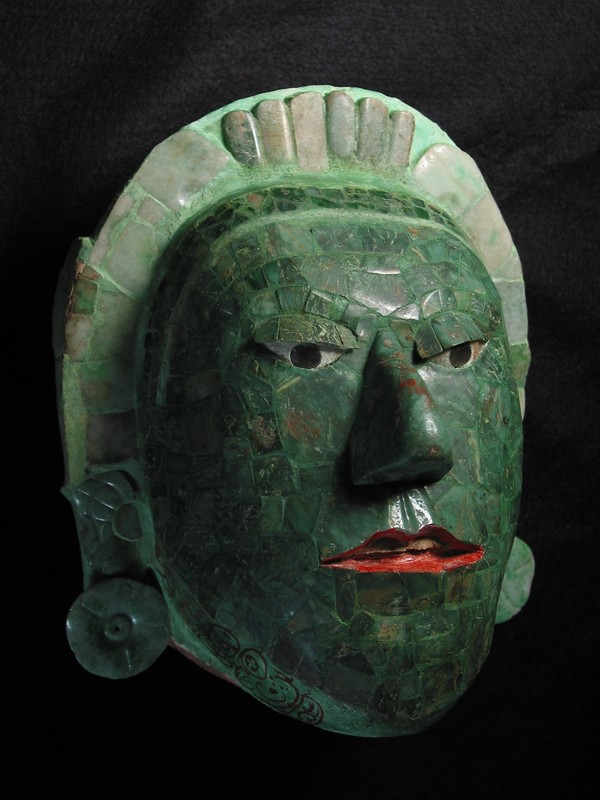

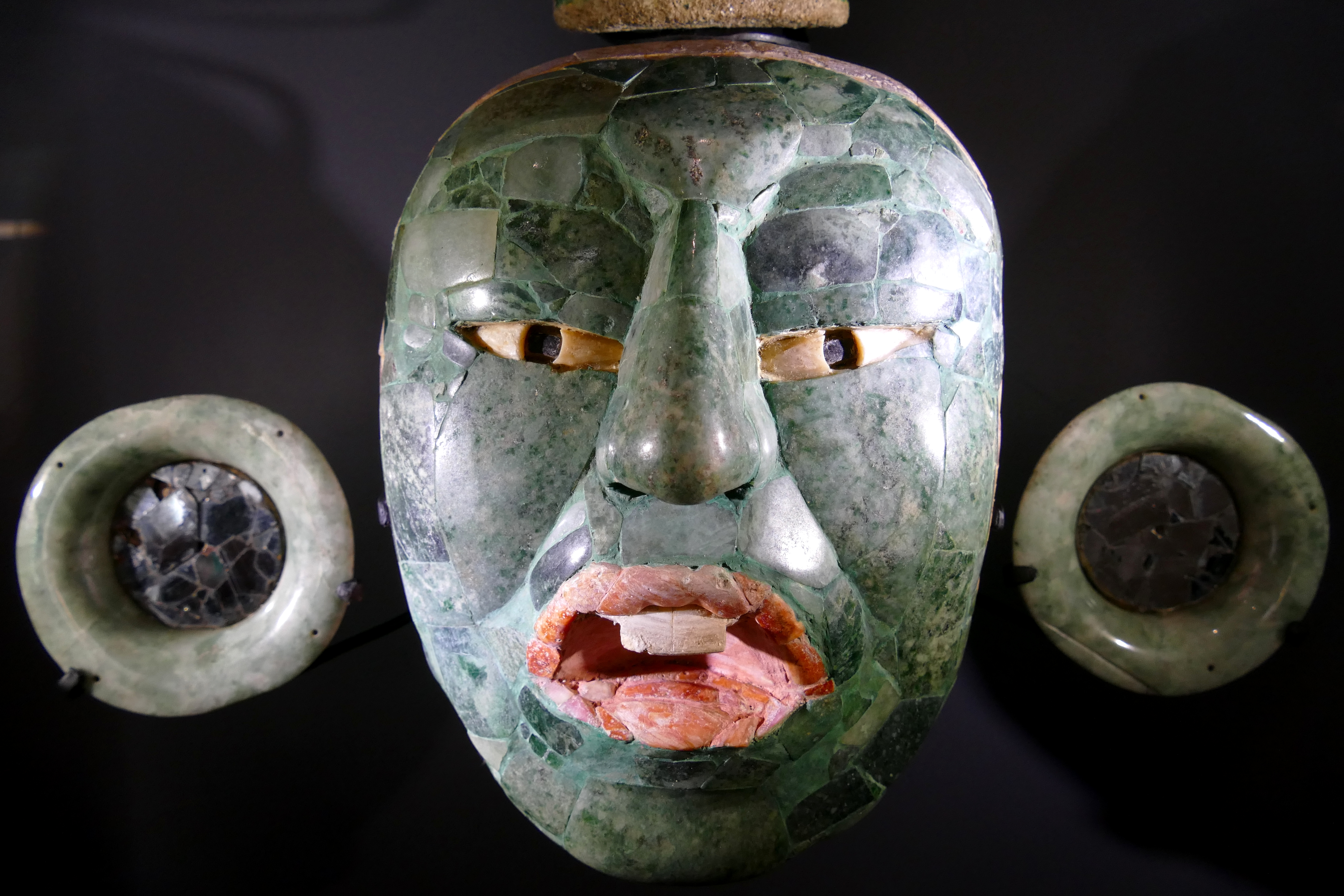

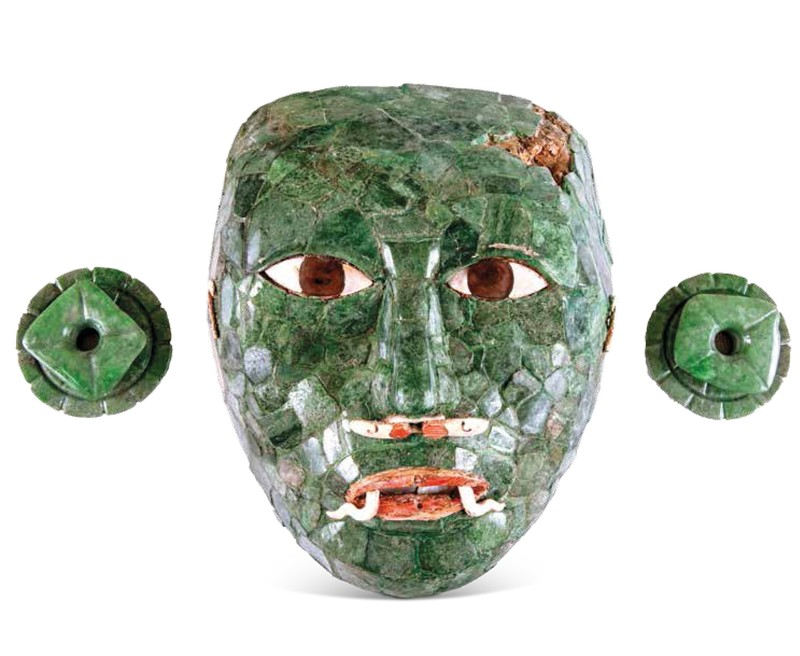

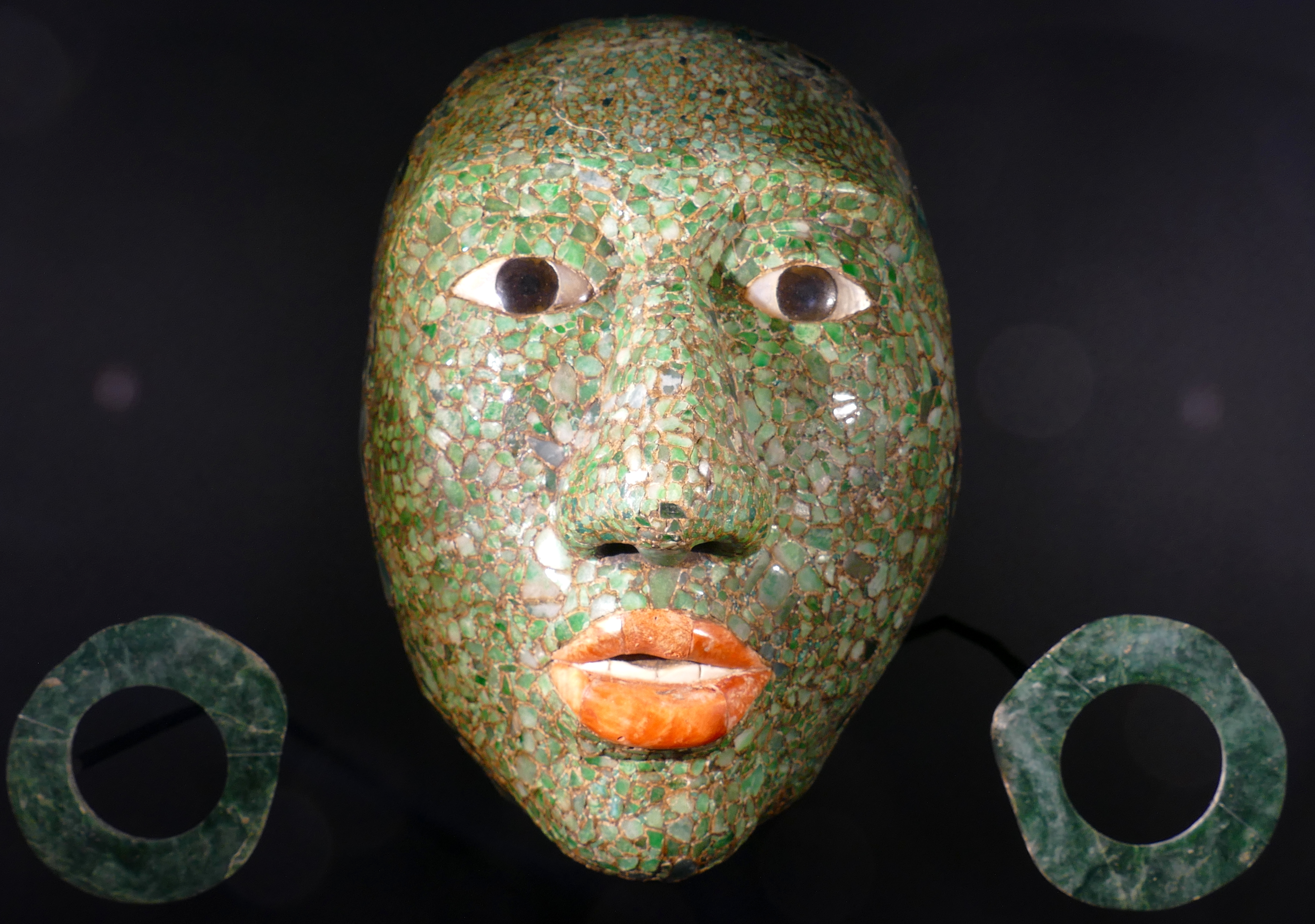

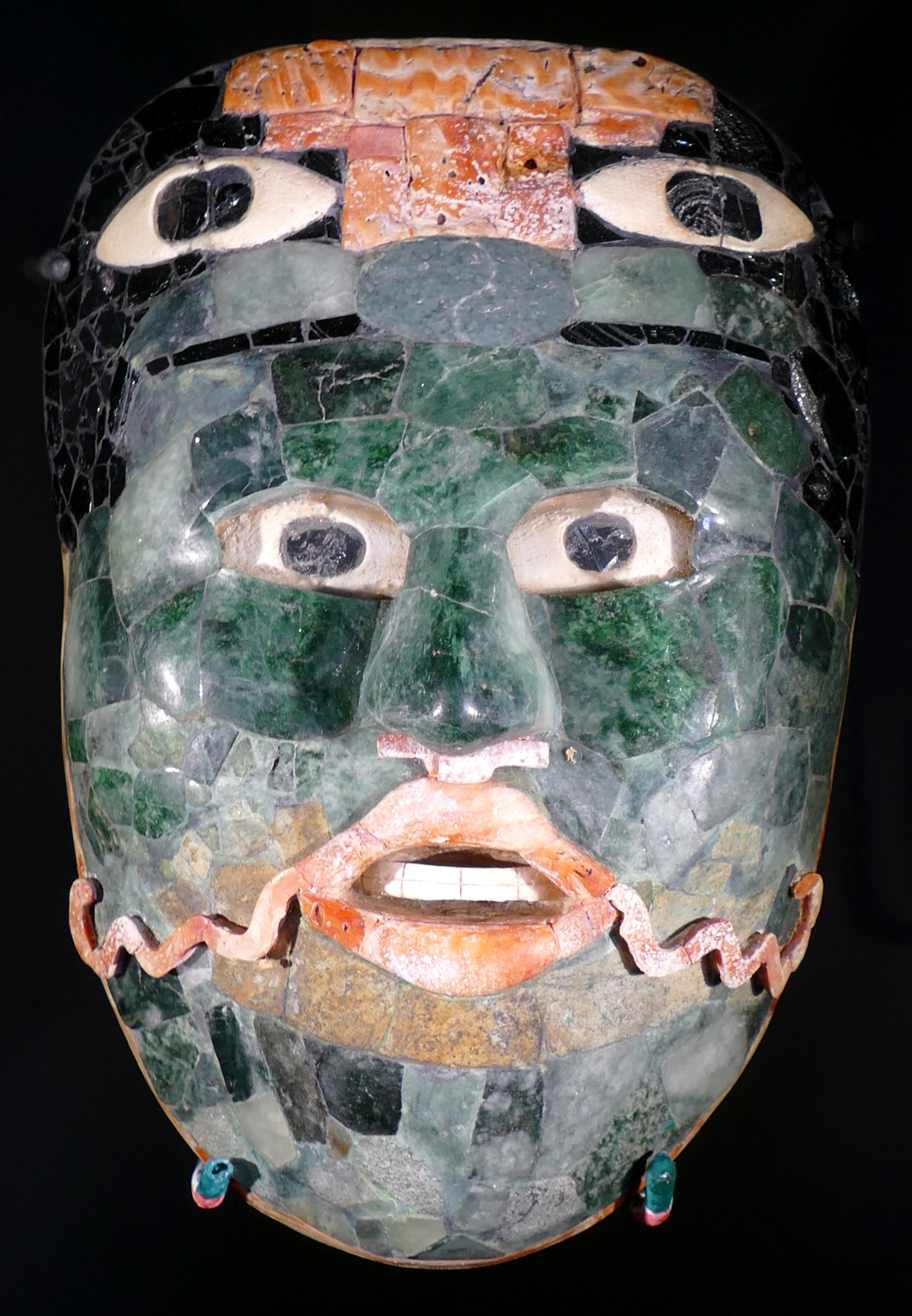

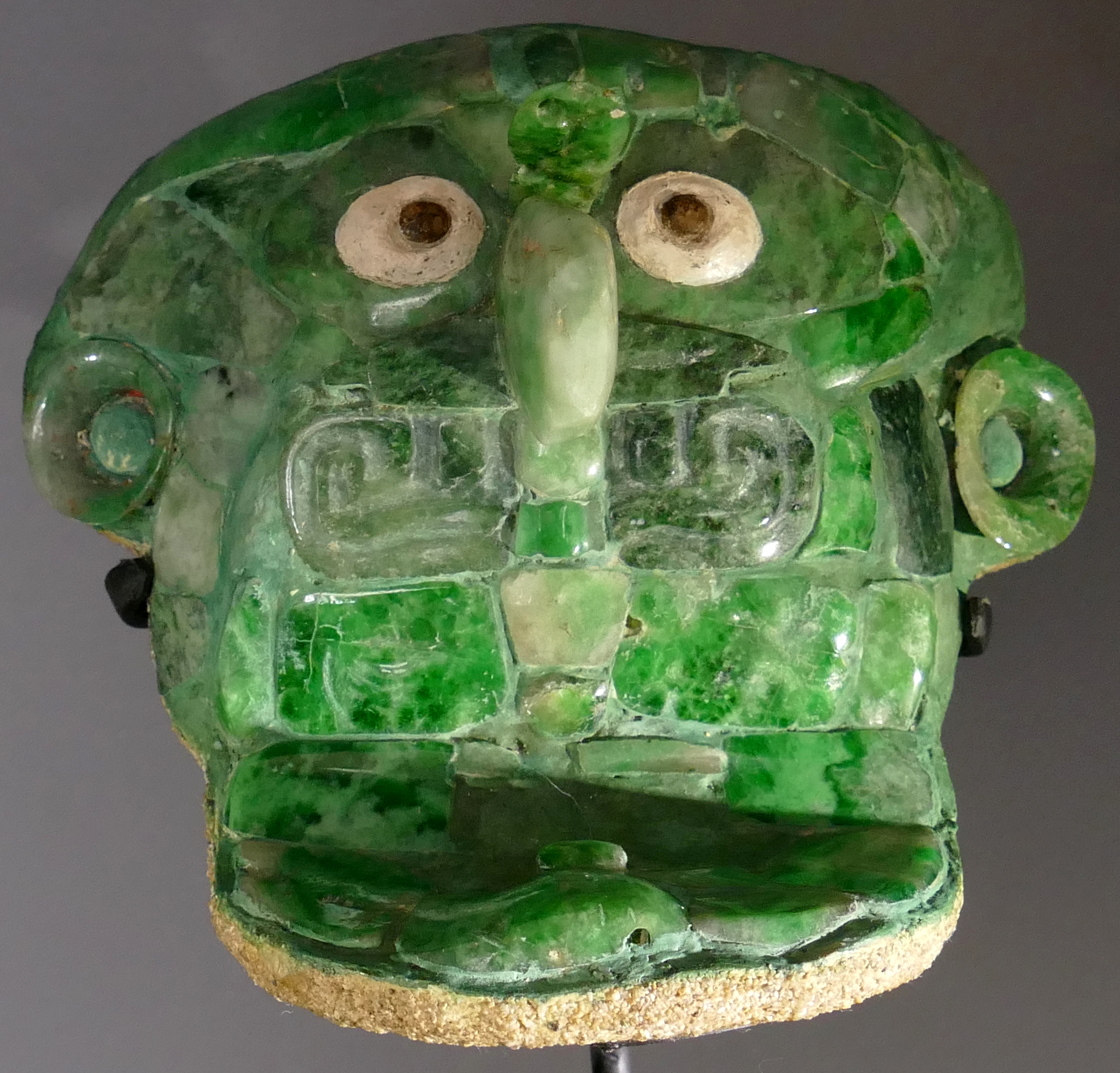
