= Ancient Maya art =

Aspect of Mayan culture

Ancient Maya art comprises the visual arts of the Maya civilization, an eastern and south-eastern Mesoamerica culture made up of a great number of small kingdoms in what is now Mexico, Guatemala, Belize and Honduras. Many regional artistic traditions existed side by side, usually coinciding with the changing boundaries of Maya polities. This civilization took shape in the course of the later Preclassic Period (from 750 BC to 100 BC), when the first cities and monumental architecture started to develop and the hieroglyphic script came into being. Its greatest artistic flowering occurred during the seven centuries of the Classic Period (c. 250 to 950 CE).

Maya art forms tend to be more stiffly organized during the Early Classic (250-550 CE) and to become more expressive during the Late Classic phase (550-950 CE). In the course of history, influences of various other Mesoamerican cultures were absorbed. In the late Preclassic, the influence of the Olmec style is still discernible (as in the San Bartolo murals), whereas in the Early Classic, the style of central Mexican Teotihuacan made itself felt, just as that of the Toltec in the Postclassic.

After the demise of the Classic kingdoms of the central lowlands, ancient Maya art went through an extended Postclassic phase (950-1550 CE) centered on the Yucatan peninsula, before the upheavals of the sixteenth century destroyed courtly culture and put an end to the Maya artistic tradition. Traditional art forms mainly survived in weaving, pottery, and the design of peasant houses.

== Maya art history ==
The nineteenth- and early-twentieth-century publications on Maya art and archaeology by Stephens, Catherwood, Maudslay, Maler and Charnay for the first time made available reliable drawings and photographs of major Classic Maya monuments.

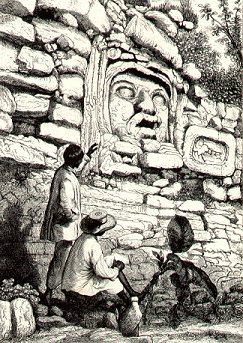
Studying a ruin at Izamal, Catherwood engraving

Following this initial phase, the 1913 publication of Herbert Spinden's A Study of Maya Art laid the foundation for all later developments of Maya art history (including iconography). The book gives an analytical treatment of themes and motifs, particularly the ubiquitous serpent and dragon motifs, and a review of the 'material arts', such as the composition of temple facades, roof combs and mask panels. Spinden's chronological treatment of Maya art was later (1950) refined by the motif analysis of the architect and specialist in archaeological drawing, Tatiana Proskouriakoff, in her book A Study of Classic Maya Sculpture. Kubler's 1969 inventory of Maya iconography, containing a site-by-site treatment of 'commemorative' images and a topical treatment of ritual and mythical images (such as the 'triadic sign'), concluded a period of gradual increase of knowledge that was soon to be overshadowed by new developments.

Starting in the early 1970s, the historiography of the Maya kingdoms – first of all, Palenque – came to occupy the forefront. Art-historical interpretation joined the historical approach pioneered by Proskouriakoff as well as the mythological approach initiated by M.D. Coe, with an archaeological illustrator, Merle Greene Robertson, and a professor of art, Linda Schele, serving as driving forces. Schele's seminal interpretations of Maya art are found throughout her work, especially in The Blood of Kings, written together with art historian M. Miller. Maya art history was also spurred by the enormous increase in sculptural and ceramic imagery, due to extensive archaeological excavations, as well as to organized looting on an unprecedented scale. From 1973 onwards, M.D. Coe published a series of books offering pictures and interpretations of unknown Maya vases, with the Popol Vuh Twin myth for an explanatory model. In 1981, Robicsek and Hales added an inventory and classification of Maya vases painted in codex style, thereby revealing even more of a hitherto barely known spiritual world.

As to subsequent developments, important issues in Schele's iconographic work have been elaborated by Karl Taube. New approaches to Maya art include studies of ancient Maya ceramic workshops, the representation of bodily experience and the senses in Maya art, and of hieroglyphs considered as iconographic units. Meanwhile, the number of monographs devoted to the monumental art of specific courts is growing. A good impression of more recent Mexican and North American art historical scholarship can be gathered from the exhibition catalogues Courtly Art of the Ancient Maya (2004) and Lives of the Gods: Divinity in Maya Art (2022).

== Architecture ==
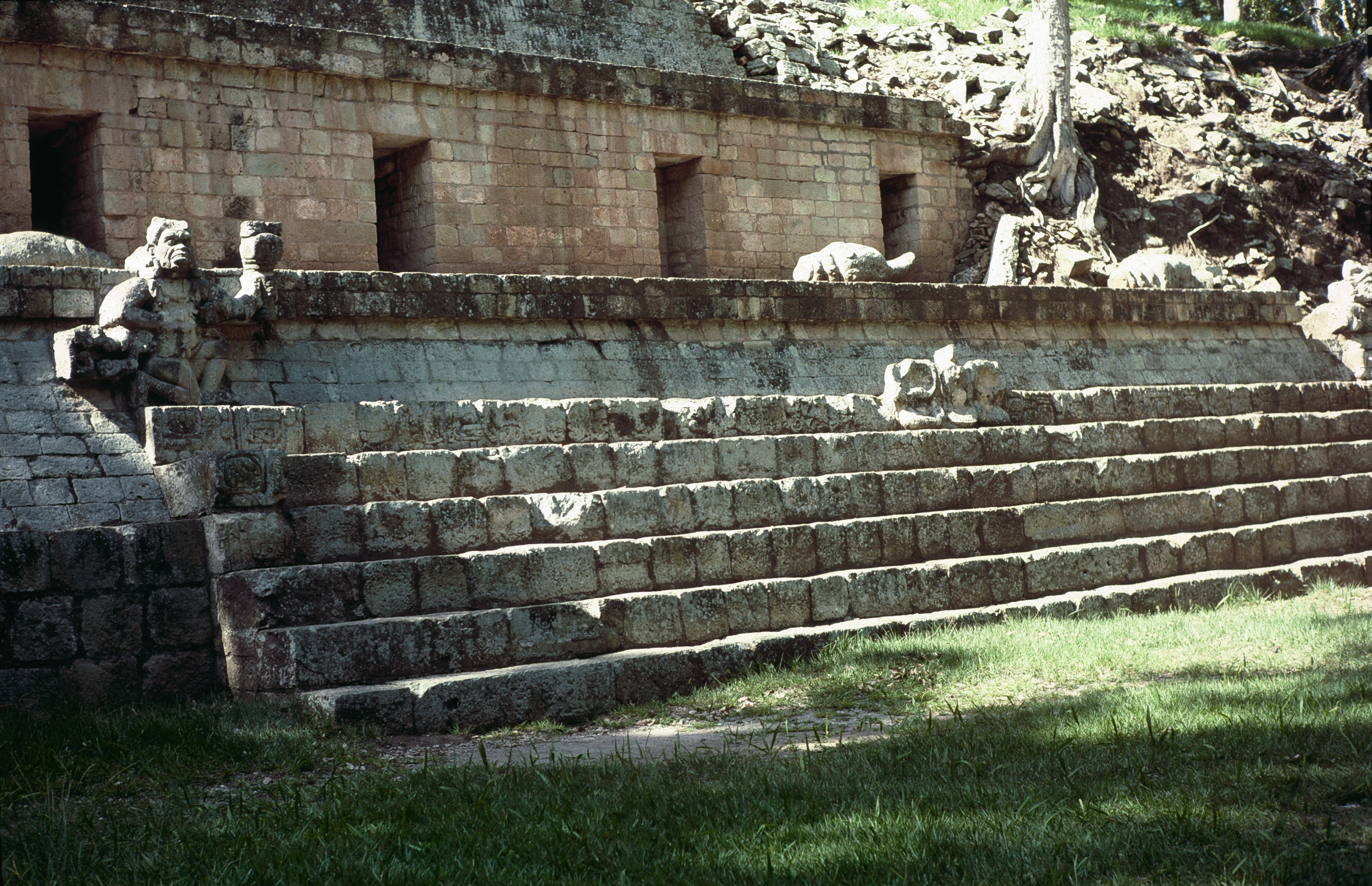
Copan, 'Reviewing Stand' with simian musicians

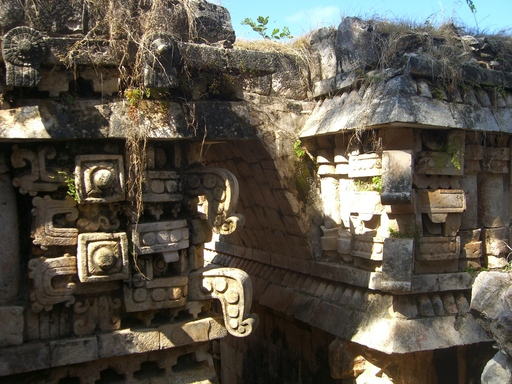
Labna, Palace, vaulted passage

The layout of the Maya towns and cities, and more particularly of the ceremonial centers where the royal families and courtiers resided, is characterized by the rhythm of immense horizontal stucco floors of plazas often located at various levels, connected by broad and often steep stairs, and surmounted by temple pyramids. Under successive reigns, the main buildings were enlarged by adding new layers of fill and stucco coating. Irrigation channels, reservoirs, and drains made up the hydraulic infrastructure. Outside the ceremonial center (especially in the southern area sometimes resembling an acropolis) were the structures of lesser nobles, smaller temples, and individual shrines, surrounded by the wards of the commoners. Dam-like causeways (sacbeob) spread from the 'ceremonial centers' to other nuclei of habitation. Fitting in with the concept of a 'theatre state', more attention appears to have been given to aesthetics than to solidity of construction. Careful attention, however, was placed on directional orientation.

Among the various types of stone structures should be mentioned:

- Ceremonial platforms (usually less than 4 meters in height)
- Courtyards and palaces
- Other residential buildings, such as a writers' house and a possible council house in Copan
- Temples and temple pyramids, the latter often containing burials and burial chambers in their base or fill, with sanctuaries on top; outstanding example are the many clustered dynastic burial temples of Tikal North Acropolis
- Ball courts
- Sweat baths, particularly those of Piedras Negras and Xultun, the latter one with remains of stucco decoration.

Among the structural ensembles are:

- 'Triadic pyramids' consisting of a dominant structure flanked by two smaller inward-facing buildings, all mounted upon a single basal platform;
- 'E-groups' consisting of a square platform with a low four-stepped pyramid on the west side and an elongated structure, or, alternatively, three small structures, on the eastern side;
- 'Twin pyramid complexes', with identical four-stepped pyramids on the east and west sides of a small plaza; a building with nine doorways on the south side; and a small enclosure on the north side housing a sculpted stela with its altar and commemorating the king's performance of a k'atun-ending ceremony.

In the palaces and temple rooms, the 'corbelled vault' was often applied. Though not an effective means to increase interior space, as it required thick stone walls to support the high ceiling, some temples utilized repeated arches, or a corbelled vault, to construct an inner sanctuary (e.g., that of the Temple of the Cross at Palenque).

The northern Maya area (Campeche and Yucatan) shows architectural characteristics of its own. Its Classic regional styles, called Puuc ('Hills'), Chenes ('Sources'), and Rio Bec, are characterized by mosaic facades in stone; geometrical reduction of realistic decoration; stacking of rain god snouts to build facades; use of portals shaped like serpent mouths; and, in the southernmost or Rio Bec area, the use of solid pseudo temple-pyramids. The most important Puuc site is Uxmal. Chichen Itza, dominating Yucatán from the Late Classic to well into the Post-Classic, features Classic buildings in Chenes and Puuc style as well as Post-Classic building types of Mexican derivation, such as the radial four-staircase pyramid, the colonnaded hall, and the circular temple. The latter features were inherited by the succeeding kingdom of Mayapan.

Far to the South, the Guatemalan Highlands had their own longstanding building traditions. However, by the Classic period, settlements did by and large not participate in the great artistic traditions of the Lowland area. In the Postclassic period, the architecture of relatively young hilltop sites, such as the Quiché capital Q'umarkaj, shows strong Toltec influences, not unlike the architecture of Chichén Itzá and Mayapán to the north. No significant murals or sculptures have been preserved from the Postclassic Highlands.

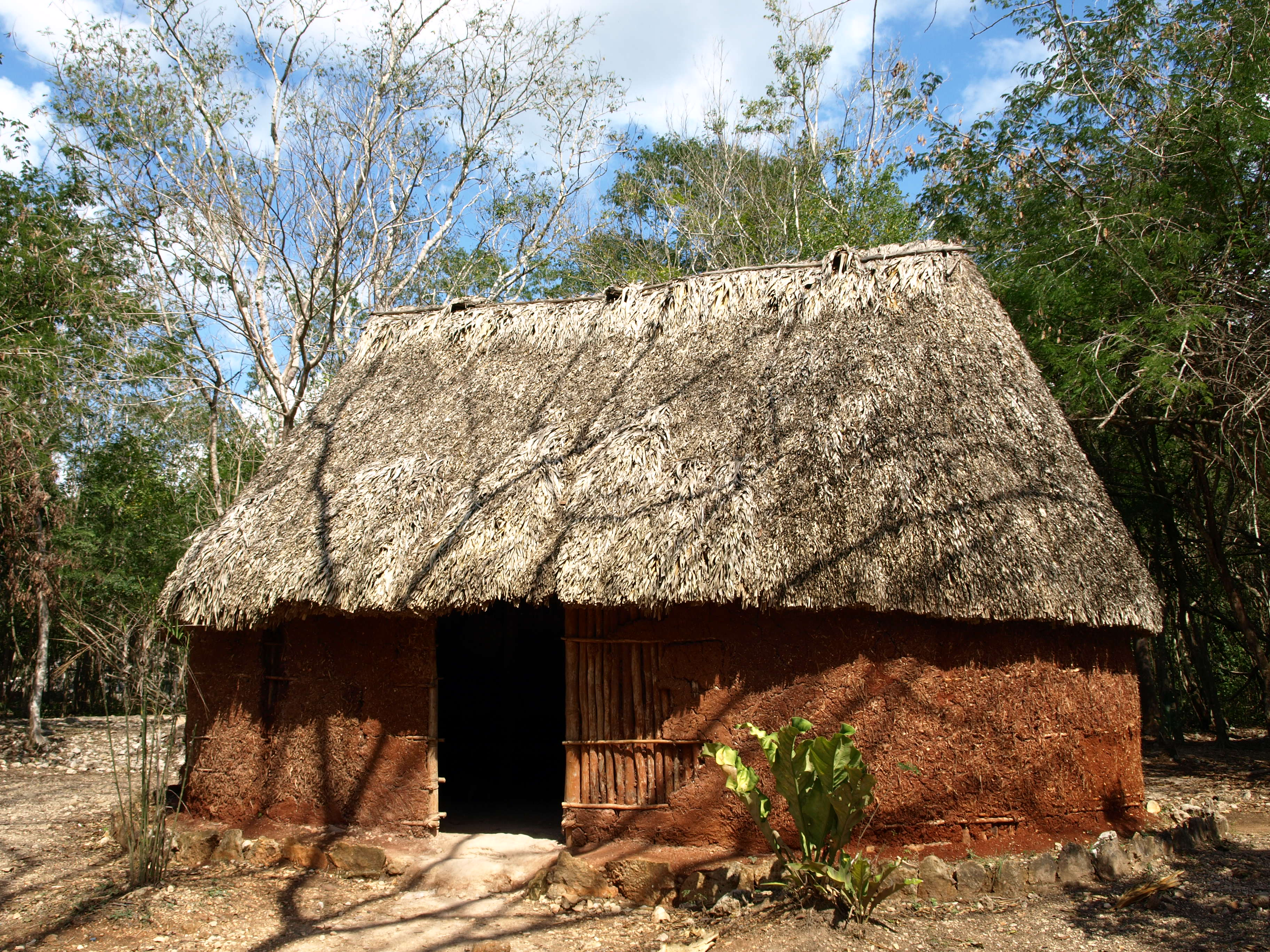
Chichen Itza, traditional Maya house

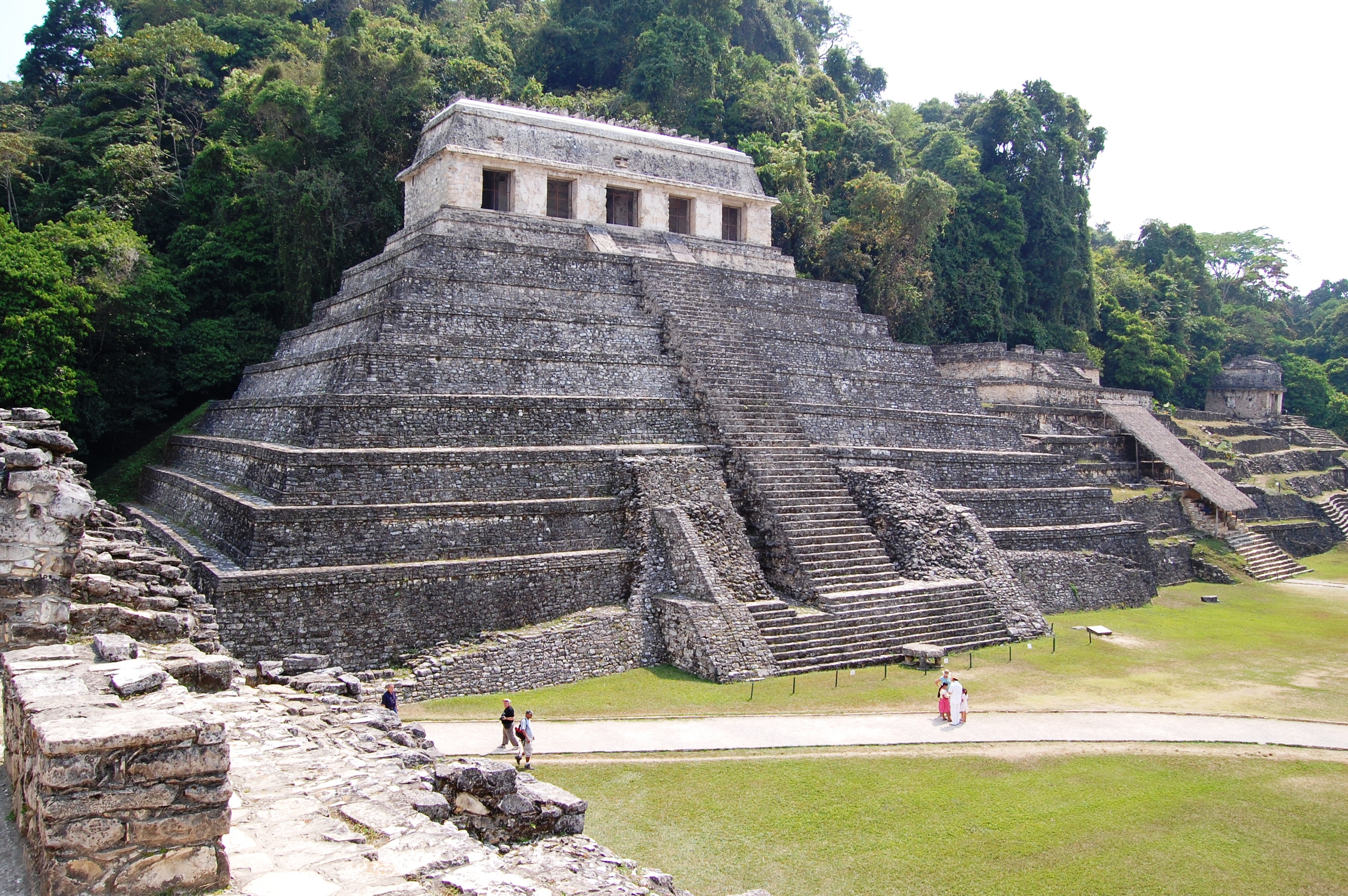
Palenque, Temple of the Inscriptions, Late Classic

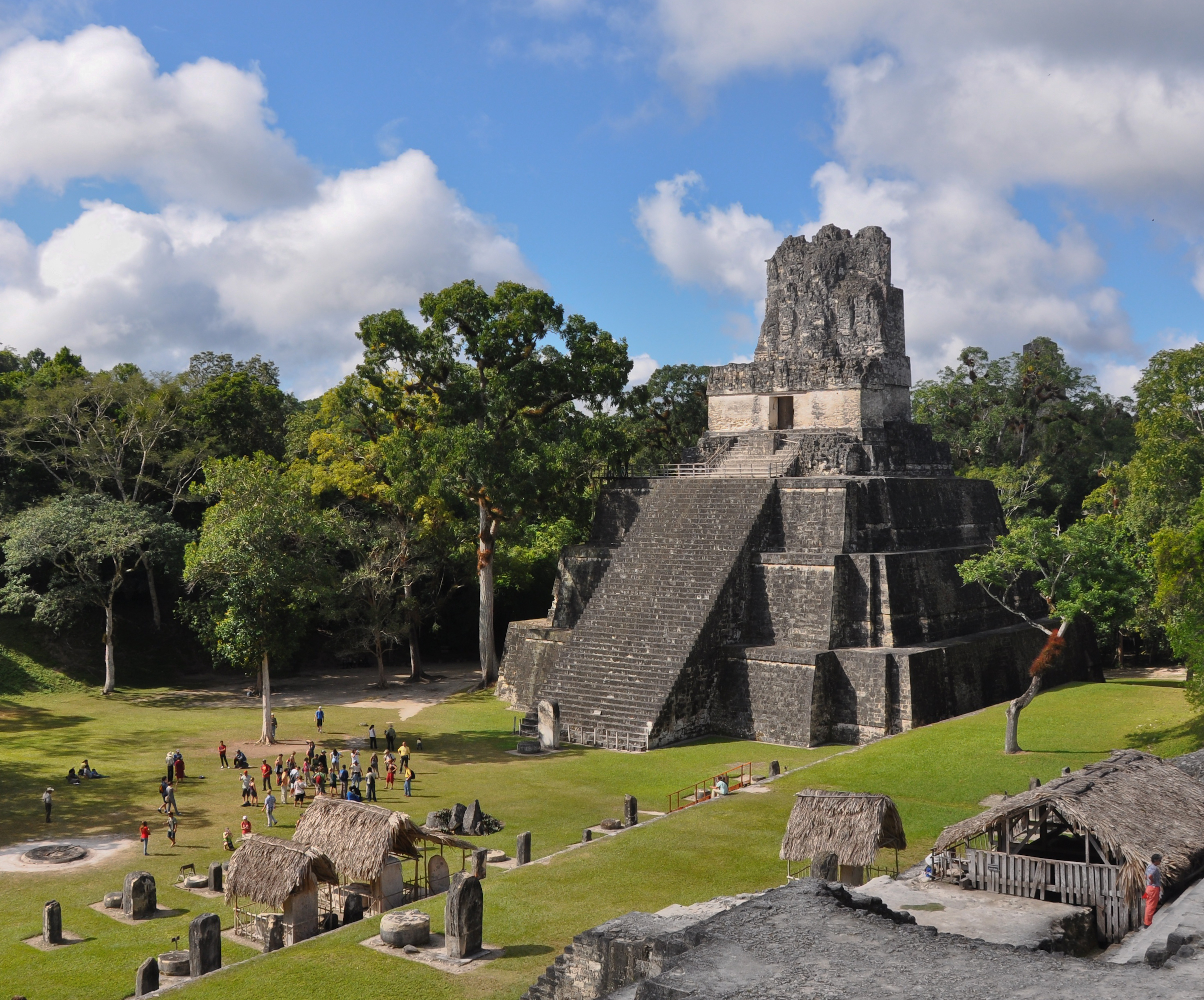
Tikal Temple II, Late Classic

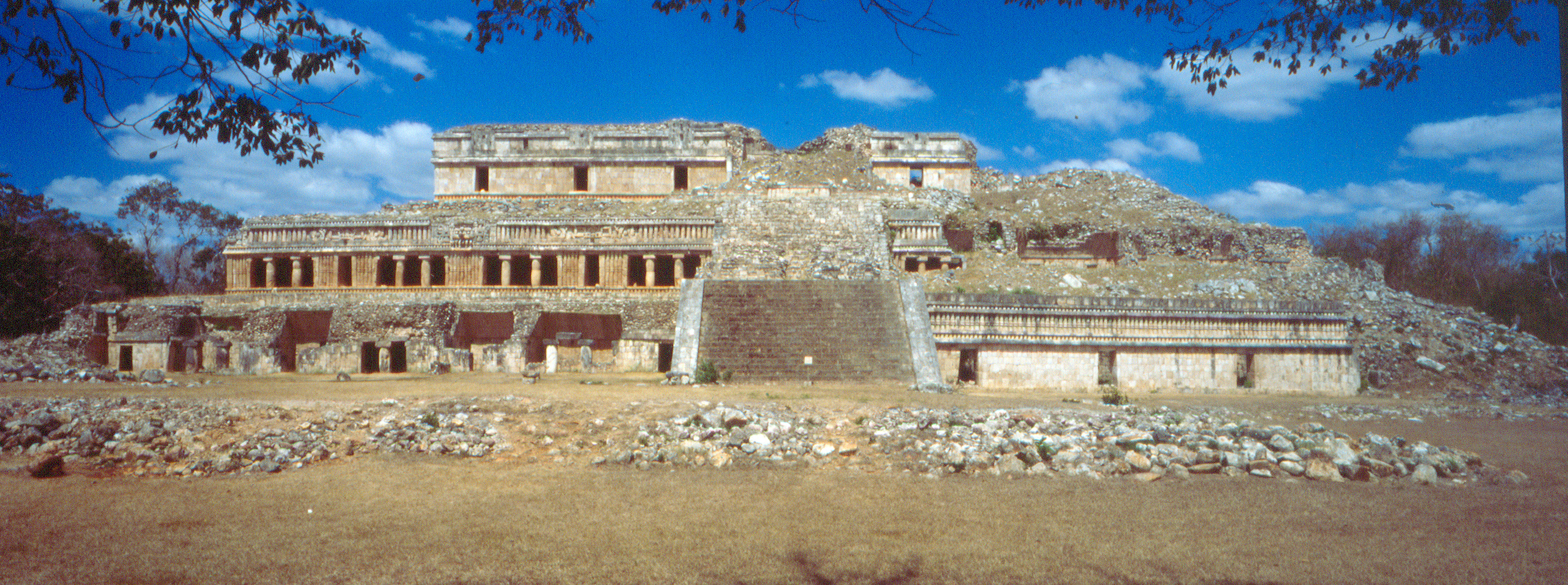
Multistoried palace, Sayil, Yucatan, Late Classic

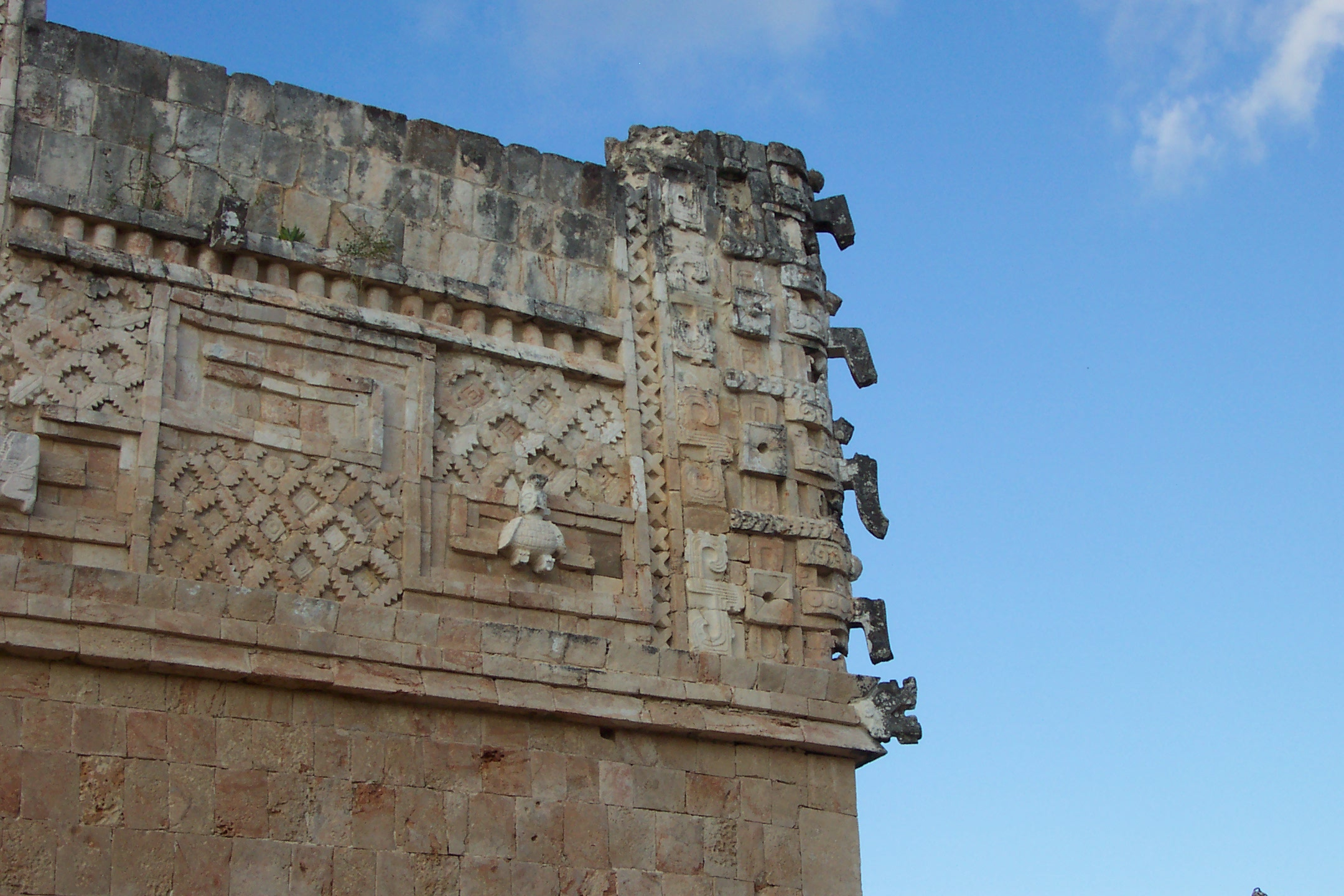
Uxmal, Nunnery building, frieze with stacked rain god snouts at corner, Late Classic

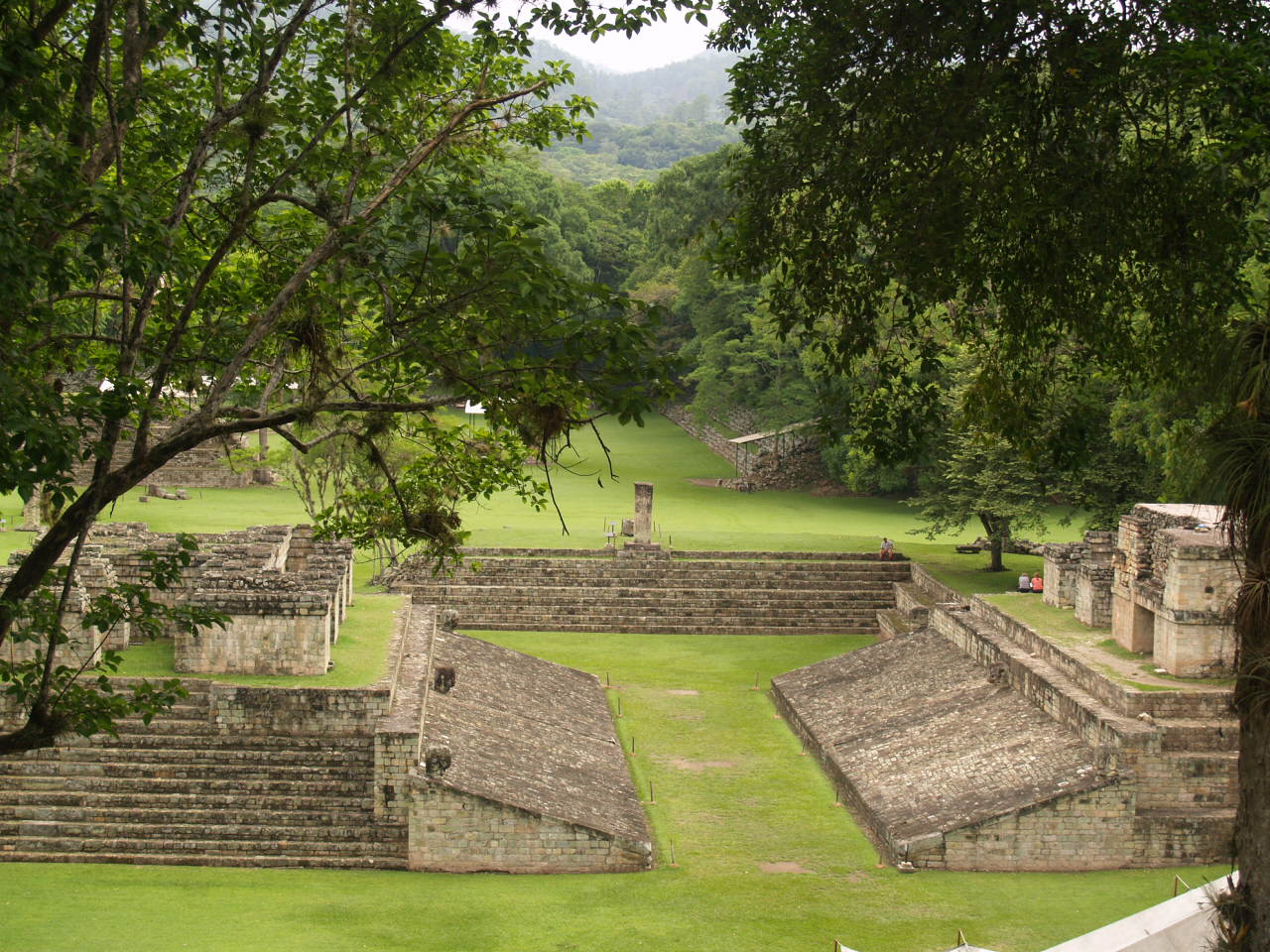
Ball court, Copan, Late Classic

Chichen Itza, radial pyramid El Castillo, Postclassic

== Stone sculpture ==
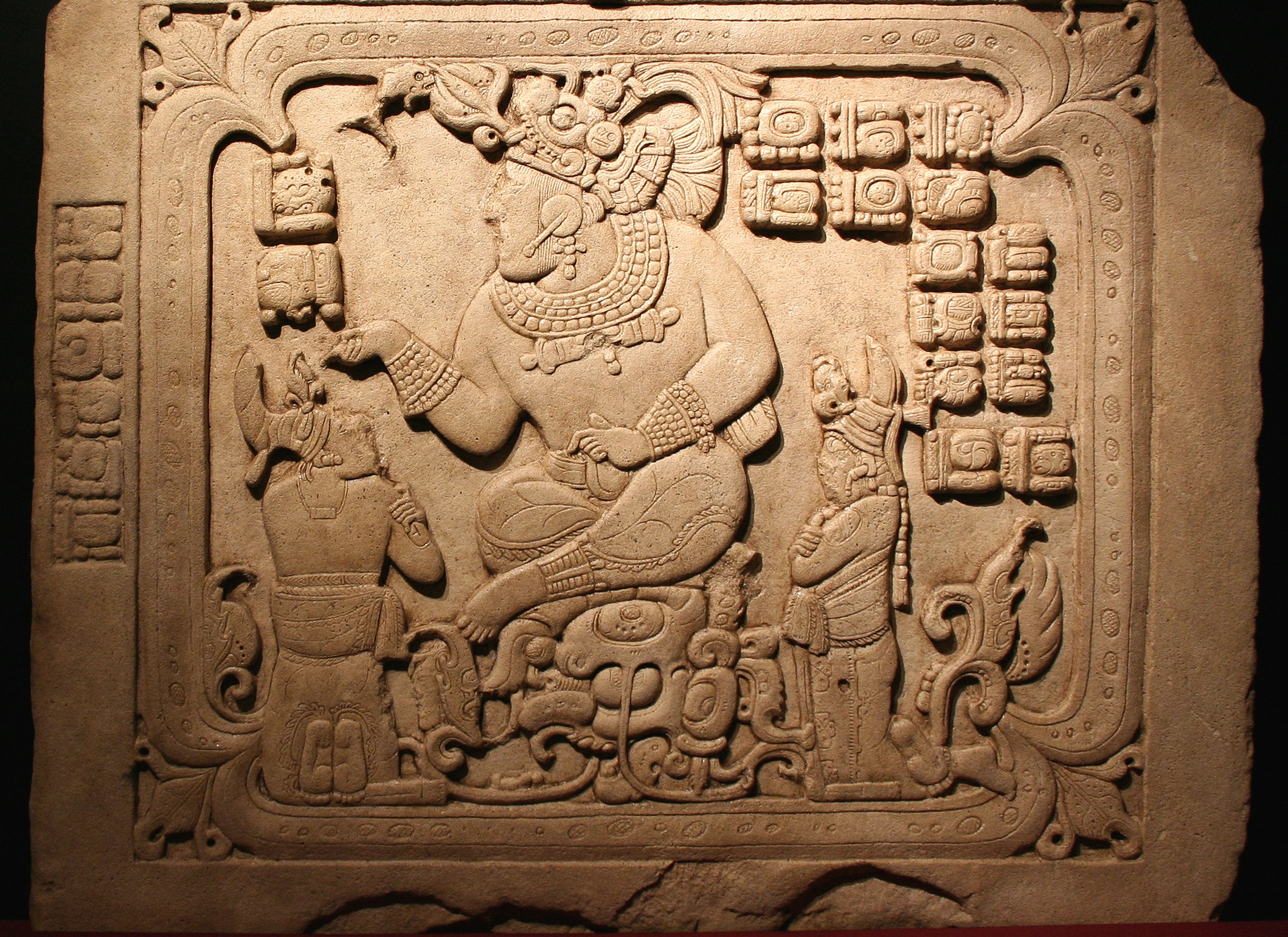
Cancuen, panel 3, seated king with two subordinates. Second half 8th century.

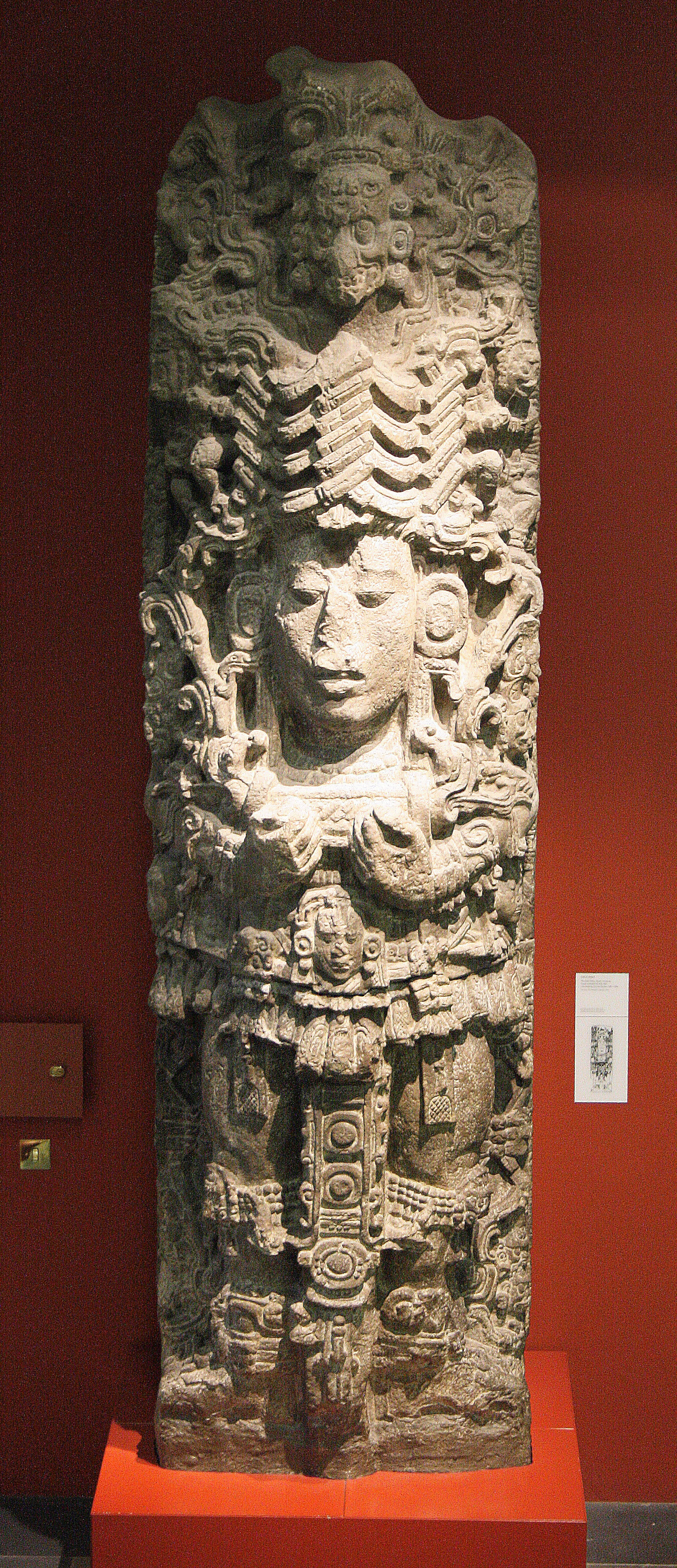
Copan stela A, Maudslay cast

The main Preclassic sculptural style from the Maya area is that of Izapa, a large site on the Pacific coast where many stelas and (frog-shaped) altars were found showing motifs also present in Olmec art. The stelas, mostly without inscriptions, often show mythological and narrative subjects, some of which appear to relate to the Twin myth of the Popol Vuh. However, next to nothing is known about the settlement's former ethnic composition. Artistically, Izapa is closely related to Kaminaljuyú, a huge and almost completely destroyed site once dominating the Guatemalan Highlands. Among its scattered remains are highlights of Late Preclassic sculpture, such as Monument 10, an altar with an intricate figural relief accompanied by a long inscription.

For the Classic Period of the central Maya area, the following major classes of stone sculpture (usually executed in limestone) may be distinguished.

- Stelas. These are large, elongated stone slabs usually covered with carvings and inscriptions, and often accompanied by round altars. Typical of the Classical period, most of them depict the rulers of the cities they were located in, often disguised as gods. Although the rulers' faces, particularly during the later Classic Period, are naturalistic in style, they usually do not show individual traits; but there are notable exceptions to this rule (e.g., Piedras Negras, stela 35). The most famous stelas are from Copan and nearby Quirigua. These are outstanding for their intricateness of detail, those of Quirigua also for sheer height (stela E measuring over 7 metres above ground level and 3 below). Both the Copan and Tonina stelas approach sculptures in the round. From Palenque, otherwise a true Maya capital of the arts, no significant stelae are known.
- Lintels, spanning doorways or jambs. Particularly Yaxchilan is renowned for its long series of lintels in deep relief, some of the most famous of which show meetings with ancestors or, perhaps, local deities.
- Panels and tablets, set in the walls and piers of buildings and the sides of platforms. This category is particularly well represented at Palenque, with the large tablets adorning the inner sanctuaries of the Cross Group temples, and with refined masterworks such as the 'Palace Tablet', the 'Tablet of the Slaves', and the multi-figure panels of the temple XIX and XXI platforms. King Pakal's carved sarcophagus lid—without equal in other Maya kingdoms—might also be included here.
- Relief columns flanking doorways in public buildings from the Puuc region (northwestern Yucatan) and similar in decoration to stelas.
- Altars, rounded or rectangular, sometimes resting on three or four boulder-like legs. They may be wholly or partly figurative (e.g., Copan turtle altar) or have a relief image on top, sometimes consisting of a single Ahau day sign (Caracol, Tonina).
- Zoomorphs, or large boulders sculpted to resemble supernatural creatures and covered with highly complicated figurative relief ornamentation. These seem to be restricted to the kingdom of Quirigua during the Late Classic period.
- Ball court markers, or relief roundels placed in the central axis of the floors of ball courts (such as those of Copan, Chinkultic, Tonina), and usually showing royal ball game scenes.
- Monumental stairs, most famously the giant hieroglyphic stairway of Copan. The hewn stone blocks of hieroglyphic stairways together constitute an extensive text. Stairways can also be decorated with a great variety of scenes (La Corona), particularly the ball game. Sometimes, the ball game becomes the stairs' chief theme (Yaxchilan), with a captive depicted inside the ball, or, elsewhere (Tonina), a full-figure captive stretched out along the step.
- Thrones and benches, the thrones with a broad, square seat, and a back sometimes iconically shaped like the wall of a cave and worked open to show human figures. Benches, covered with relief on the front, tend to be incorporated into the surrounding architecture; they are more elongated, and lack a back support. Examples from Palenque and Copan have supports showing cosmological carriers (Bacabs, Chaaks).
- Stone sculpture in the round is especially known from Copan and Toniná. It is represented by statuary, such as a seated Copan scribe as well as captive figures and small stelas from Toniná; by certain figurative architectural elements, such as the twenty maize deities from the façade of Copan Temple 22; and by giant sculptures such as the symmetrically-positioned jaguars and simian musicians of Copán, that were integral parts of architectural design.
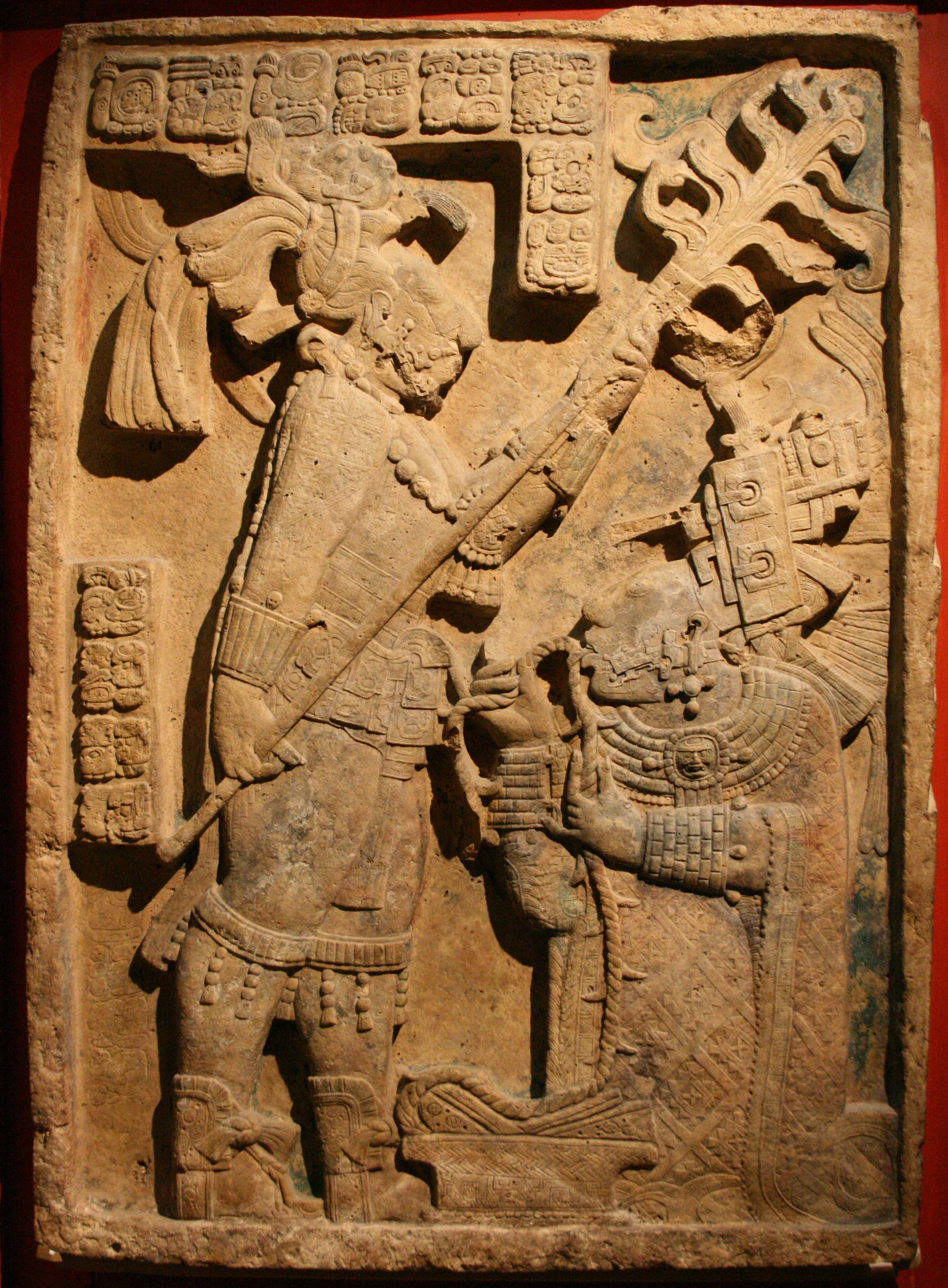
Yaxchilan lintel 24, king holding torch and queen letting blood, 723–726 CE (British Museum)

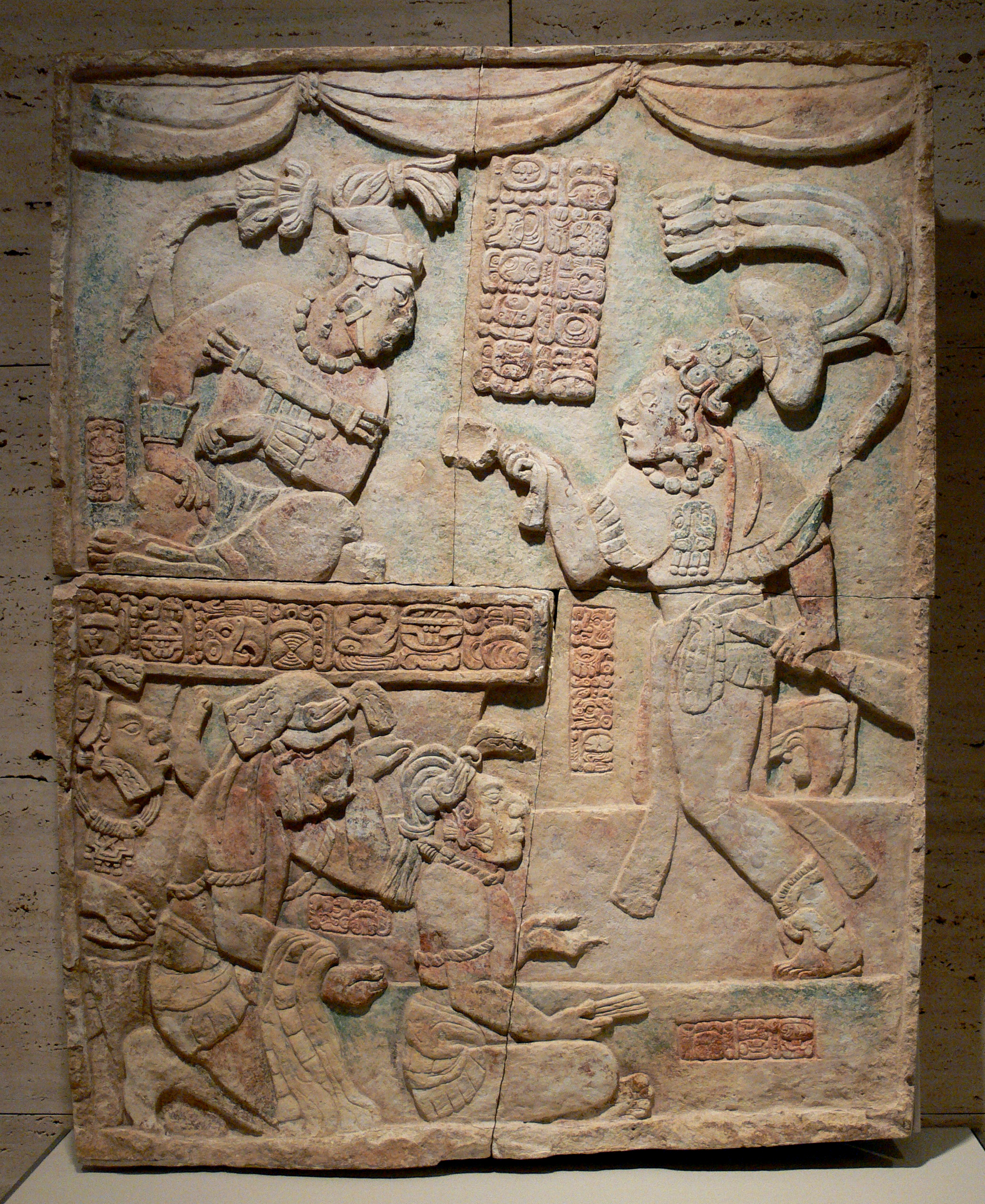
Yaxchilan lintel, war chief presenting captives to the king, 783 CE (Kimbell Art Museum)

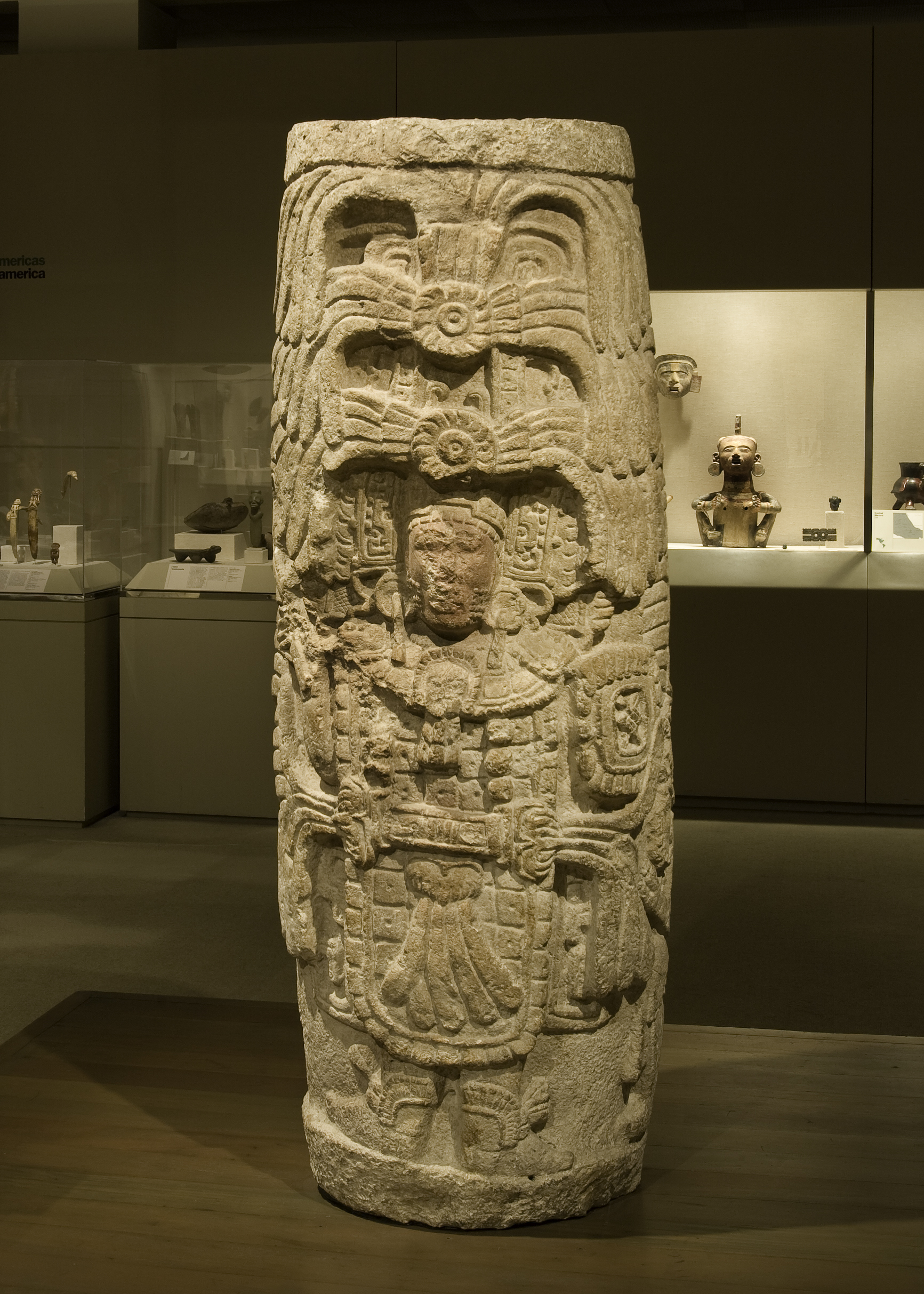
Relief column, Late Classic (Metropolitan Museum of Art)

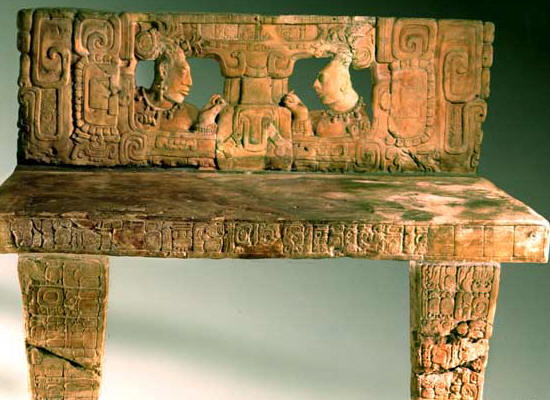
Piedras Negras throne 1, with heads restored, Late Classic (Museo Nacional de Antropología e Historia de Guatemala)

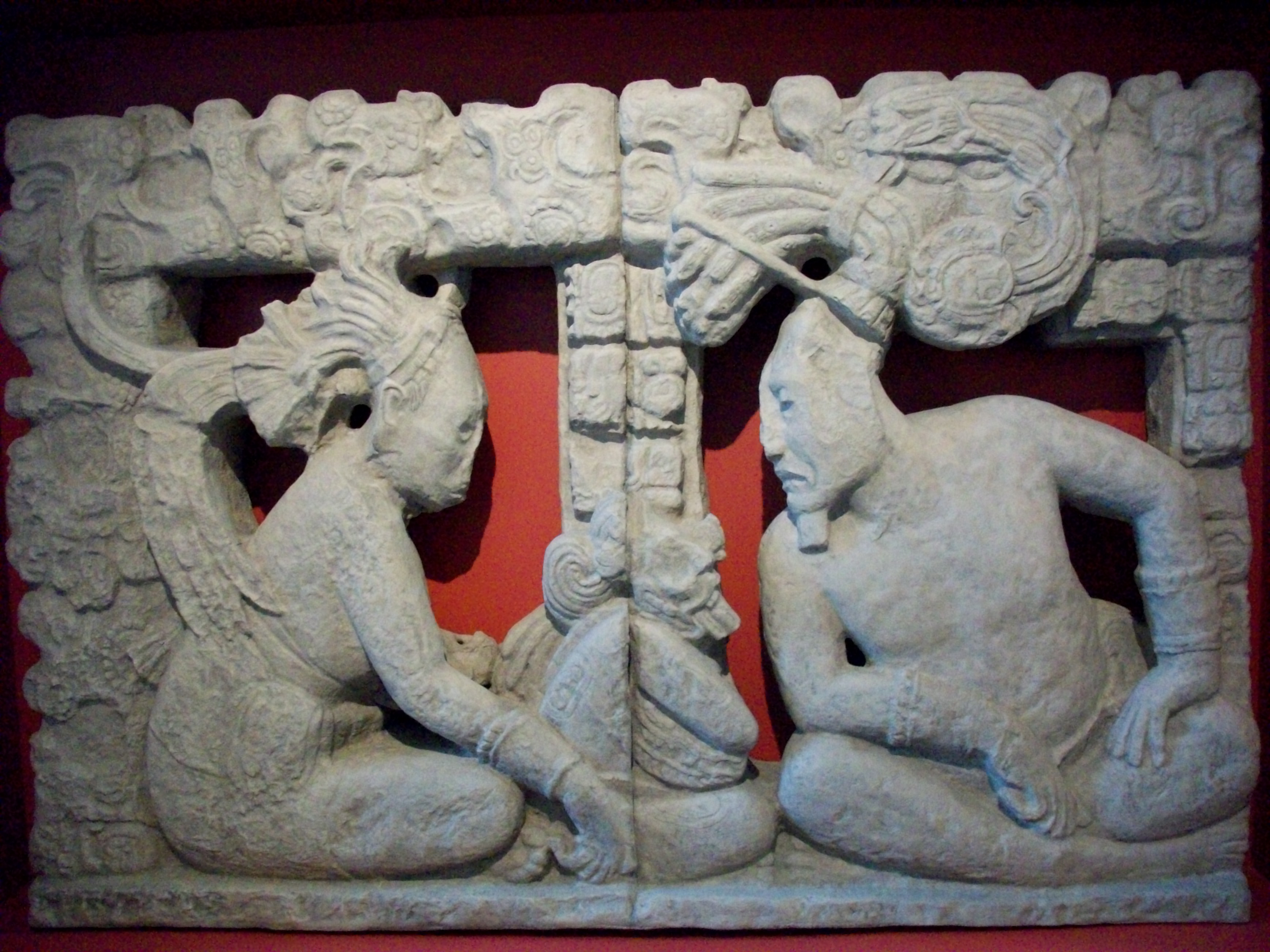
Back of throne, Late Classic (Museo Amparo)

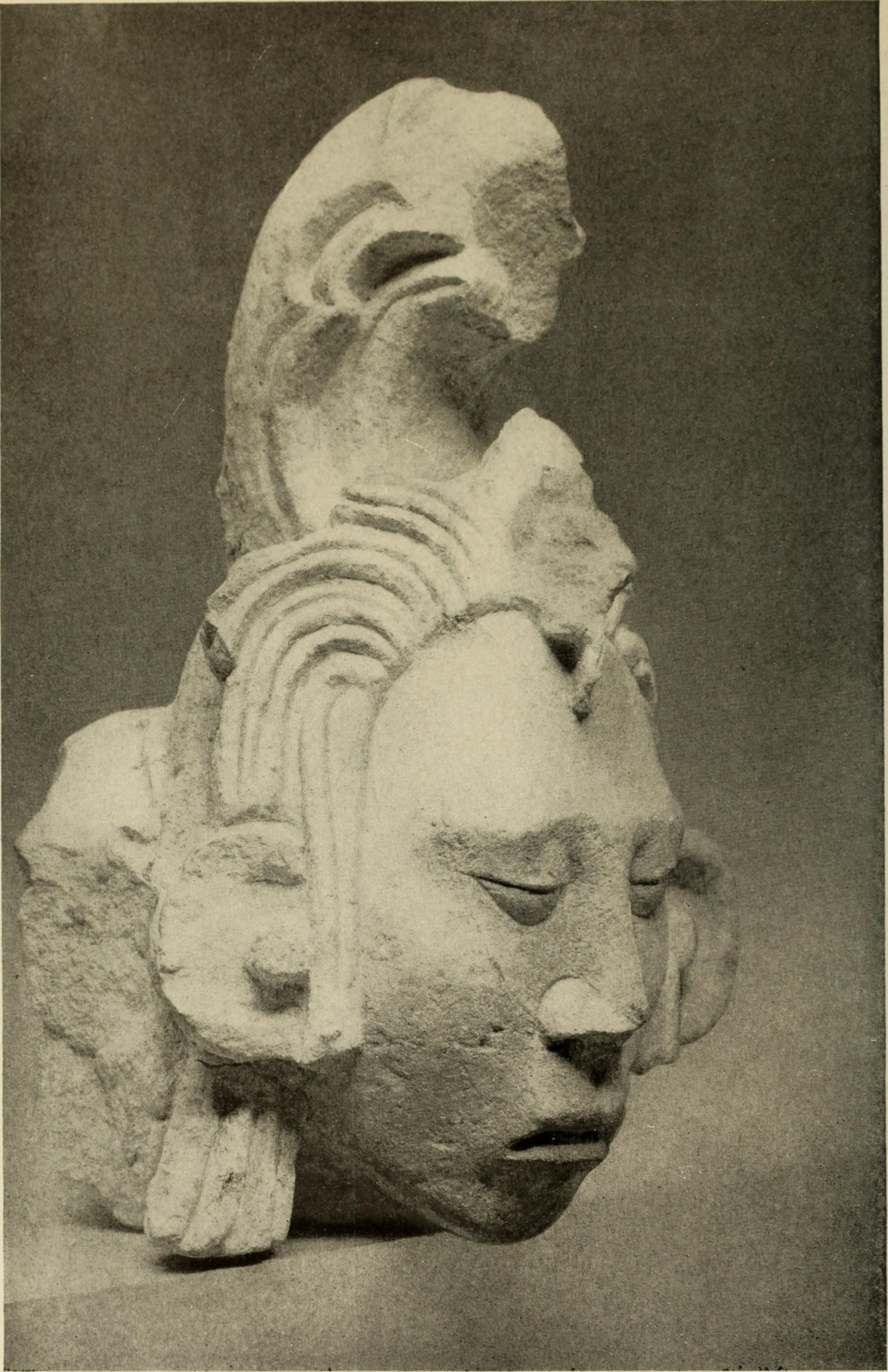
One of twenty maize god sculptures from Copan temple 22, Late Classic (Peabody Museum of Archaeology and Ethnology)

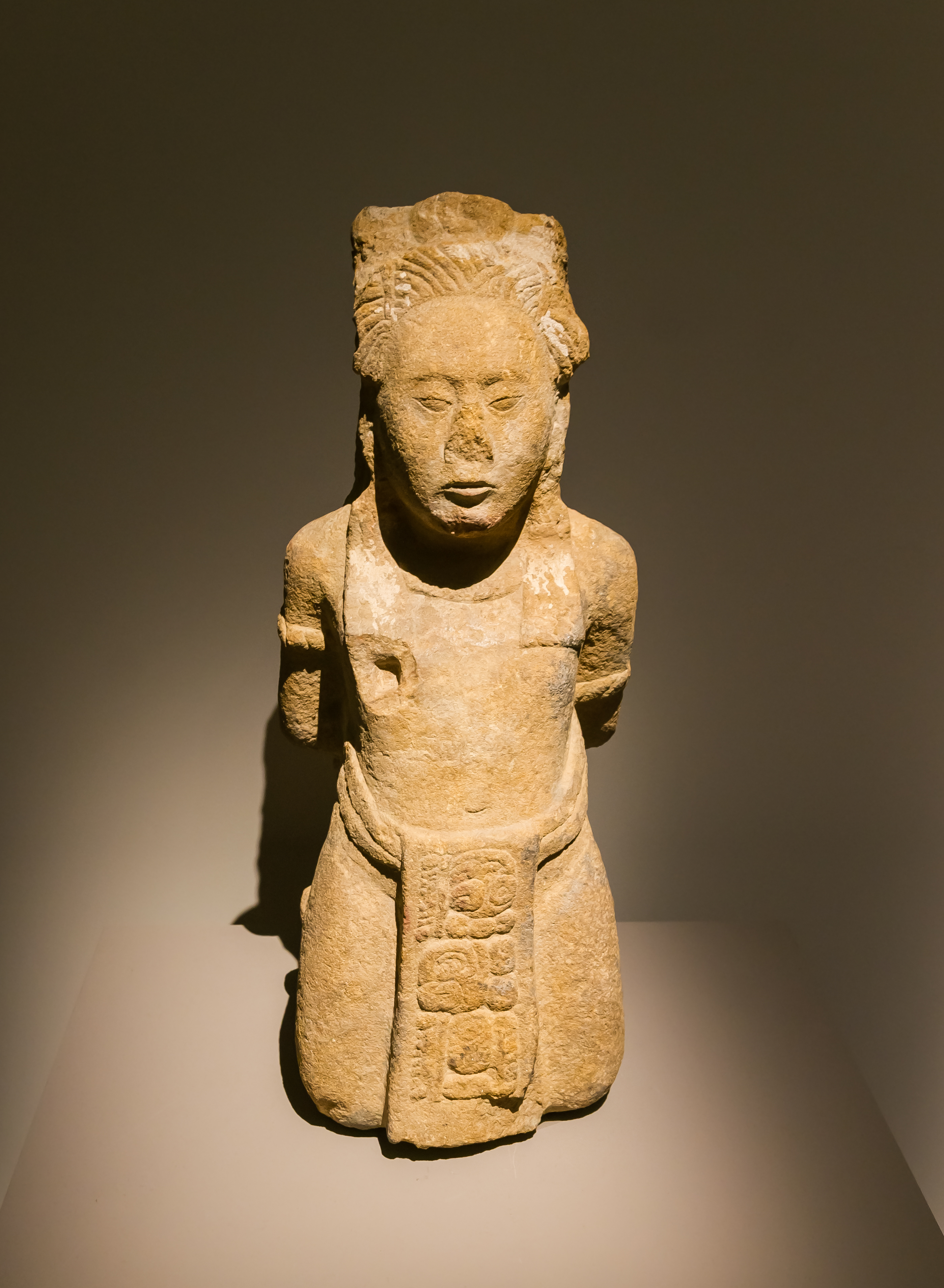
Tonina monument 151, bound prisoner, Classic

Stela with Ix Mutal Ahaw, 761 CE (De Young Museum)

== Wood carving ==
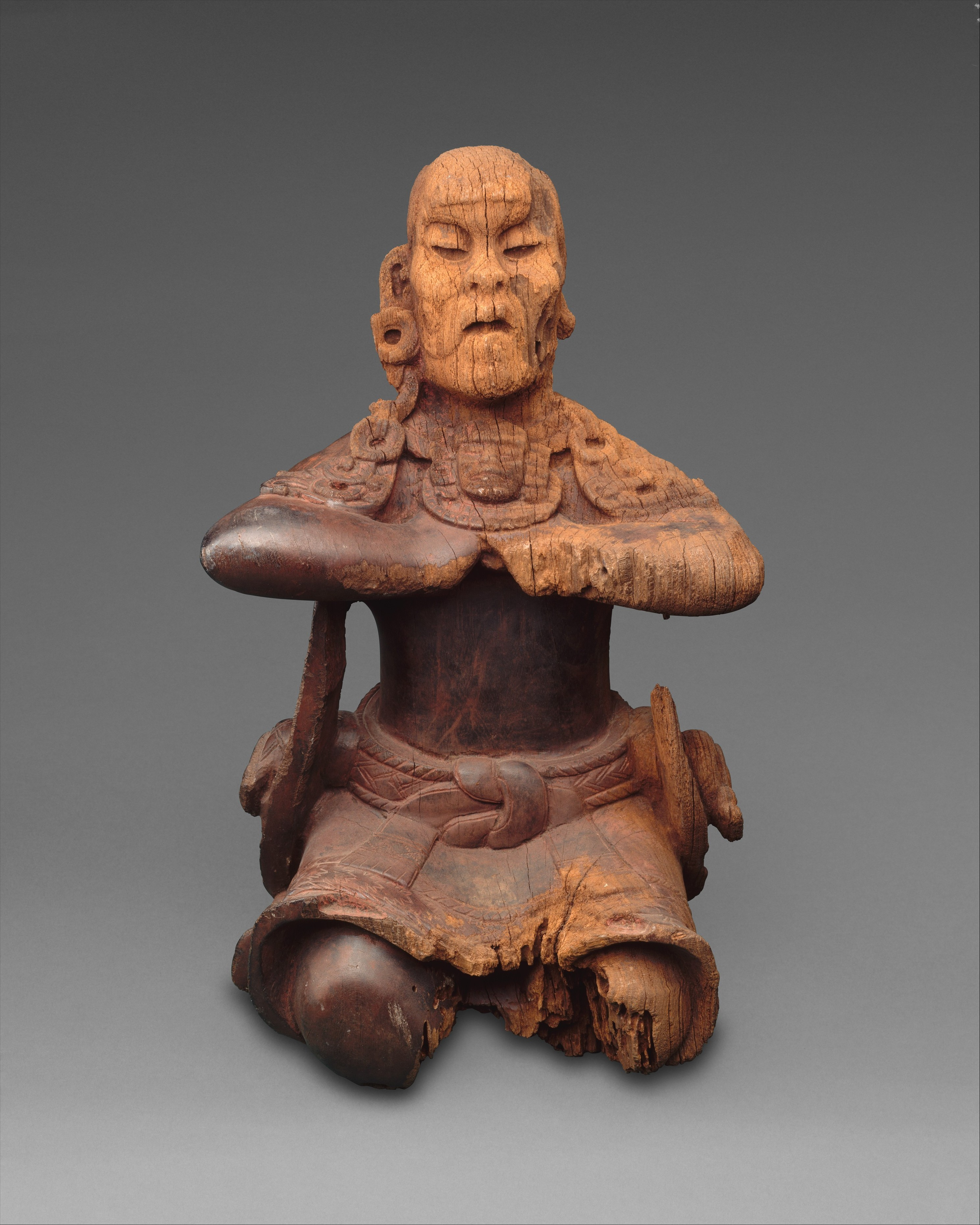
Possible mirror bearer; 6th century (Metropolitan Museum of Art)

It is believed that carvings in wood were once extremely common, but only a few examples have survived. Most 16th-century wood carvings, considered objects of idolatry, were destroyed by the Spanish colonial authorities. The most important Classic examples consist of intricately worked lintels, mostly from the main Tikal pyramid sanctuaries, with one specimen from nearby El Zotz. The Tikal wood reliefs, each consisting of several beams, and dating to the 8th century, show a king on his seat with a protector figure looming large behind, in the form of a Teotihuacan-style 'war serpent' (Temple I lintel 2), a jaguar (Temple I lintel 3), or a human impersonator of the jaguar god of terrestrial fire (Temple IV lintel 2). Other Tikal lintels depict an obese king wearing a jaguar dress and standing in front of his seat (Temple III lintel 2); and most famously, a victorious king, dressed as an astral death god, and standing on a palanquin underneath an arching feathered serpent (Temple IV lintel 3). A rare utility object is a tiny lidded box from Tortuguero with hieroglyphic text all around. Free sculpture in wood, dating back to the 6th century, is represented by a dignified seated man possibly functioning as a mirror bearer.

== Stucco modeling ==
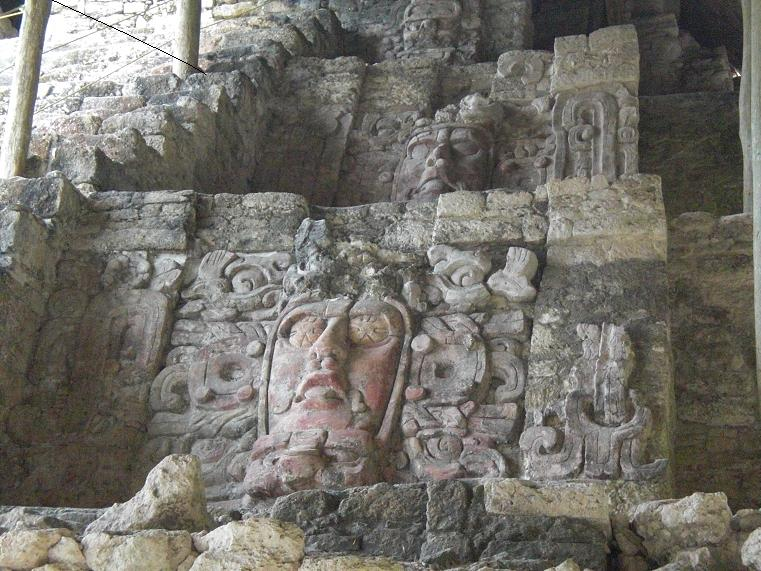
Stucco mask panels, Early Classic, Kohunlich

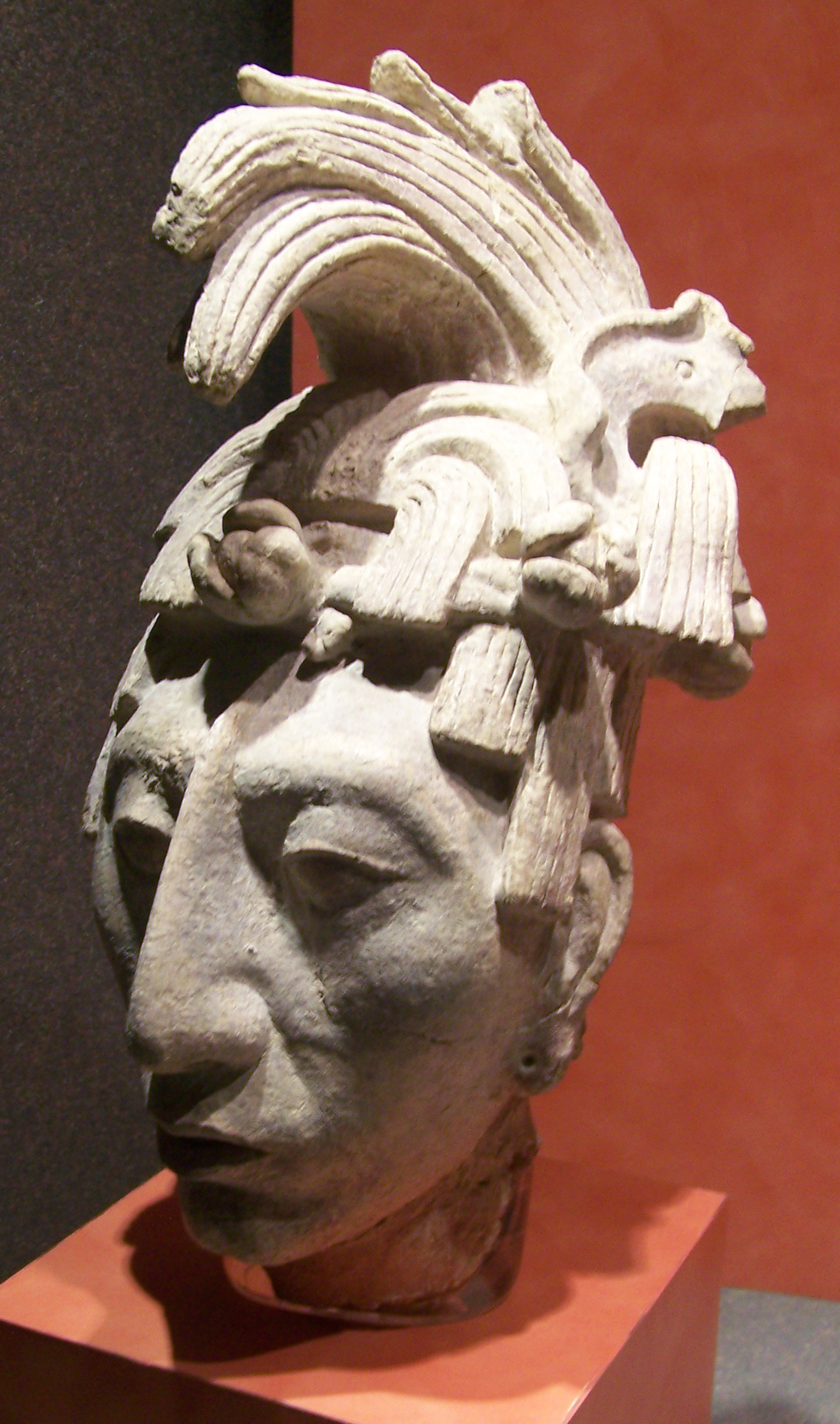
Stucco portrait of K'inich Janaab Pakal I, 615–683 CE (National Museum of Anthropology (Mexico)

At least since Late Preclassic times, modeled and painted stucco plaster covered the floors and buildings of the town centers and provided the setting for their stone sculptures. Often, large mask panels with the plastered heads of deities in high relief (particularly those of sun, rain, and earth) are found attached to the sloping retaining walls of temple platforms flanking stairs (e.g., Kohunlich). Stucco modeling and relief work can also cover the entire building, as shown by Temple 16 of Copan, in its 6th-century form (known as 'Rosalila'). Dedicated to the first king, Yax K'uk' Mo', this early temple has preserved plastered and painted facades. The stuccoed friezes, walls, piers, and roof combs of the Late Preclassic and Classic periods show varying and sometimes symbolically complicated decorative programs.

Several solutions for dividing up and ordering the stuccoed surfaces of buildings were applied, serialization being one of them. The Early Classic walls of the 'Temple of the Night Sun' in El Zotz consist of a series of subtly varied deity mask panels, whereas the frieze of a Balamku palace, also from the Early Classic, originally had a series of four rulers enthroned above the open ophidian mouths of four different animals (a toad among them) associated with symbolic mountains. Conversely, friezes may be centered on a single ruler again sitting on a symbolic (maize) mountain, such as a frieze from Holmul, with two feathered serpents emanating from below the ruler's seat, and another one from Xultun, on which the ruler carries a large ceremonial bar with emerging jaguar-like figures. An Early-Classic temple frieze from Placeres, Quintana Roo, has the large mask panel of a young lord or deity in the middle, with two lateral 'Grandfather' deities extending their arms.

Often, a frieze is divided into compartments. Late Preclassic friezes of El Mirador, for example, show the intervening spaces of an undulating serpent's body filled out with aquatic birds, and the sections of an aquatic band with swimming figures. Similarly, a Classic palace frieze in Acanceh is divided into panels holding different animal figures reminiscent of wayob, while a wall in Tonina has lozenge-shaped fields suggesting a scaffold and presenting continuous narrative scenes that relate to human sacrifice.

Plastered 'roof combs' are similar to some of the friezes above in that they usually show large representations of rulers, who may again be seated on a symbolic mountain, and also, as on Palenque's Temple of the Sun, set within a cosmological framework. Further examples of Classic stucco modeling include the piers of the Palenque Palace, embellished with a series of lords and ladies in ritual dress, and the 'baroque', Late-Classic Chenes-style stucco entrance, beset with naturalistic human figures, on the Acropolis (Str. 1) of Ek' Balam.

Unique in Mesoamerica, Classic Period stucco modeling includes realistic portraiture of a quality equalling that of Roman ancestral portraits, with the lofty stucco heads of Palenque rulers and portraits of dignitaries from Tonina as outstanding examples. The modeling recalls that of certain Jaina ceramic statuettes. Some, but not all, of these portrait heads were once part of life-size stucco figures adorning temple crests. In the same way, one finds stucco glyphs that were once a part of stuccoed texts.

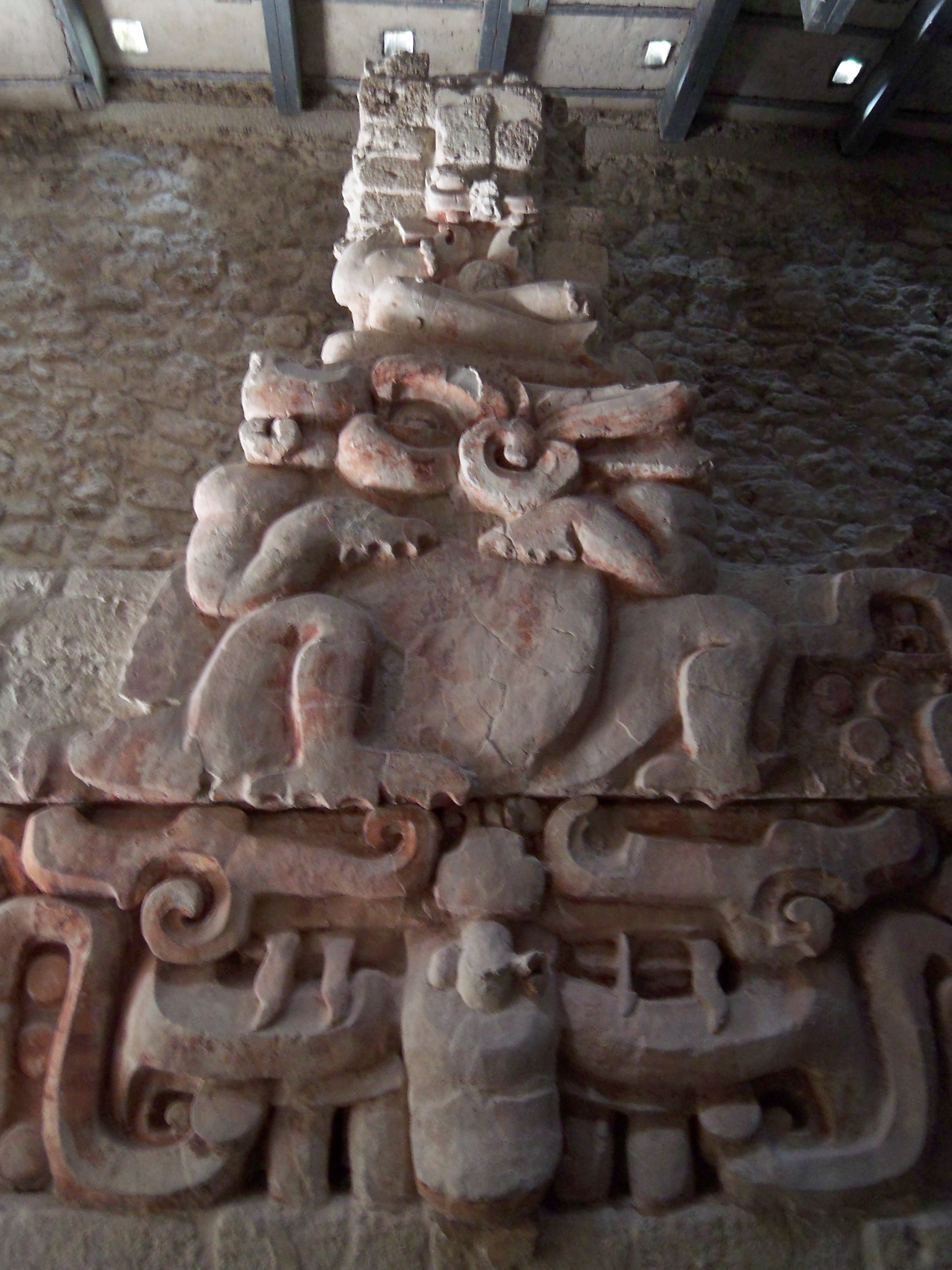
Balamku, part of a frieze, toad seated on mountain icon and belging forth king, Classic

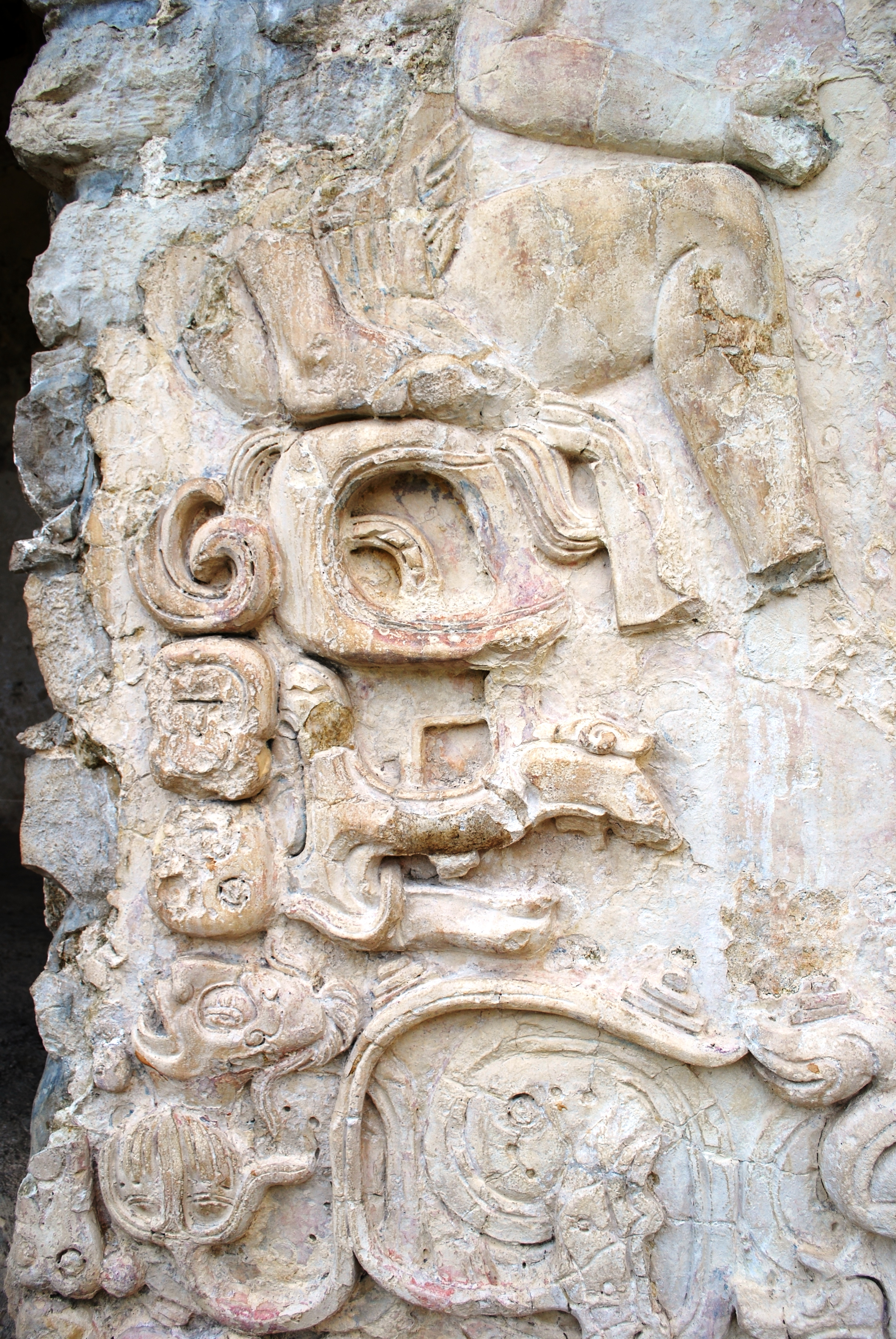
Palenque Palace, House D, detail of stucco relief showing water lilies, long-nosed deity head and legs of seated figure, Classic

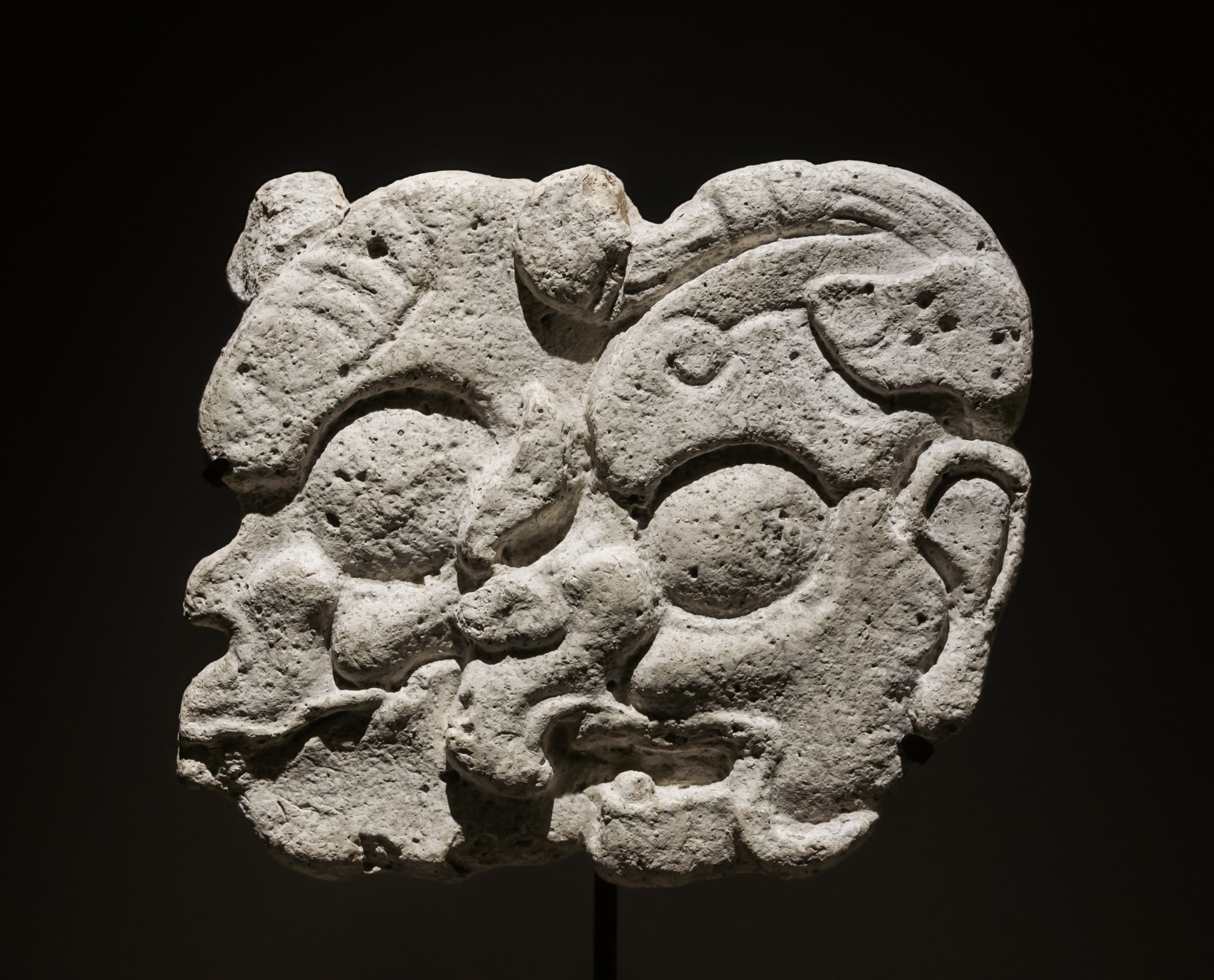
Palenque Templo Olvidado, calendrical glyphs detached from stucco text on pillar, Classic

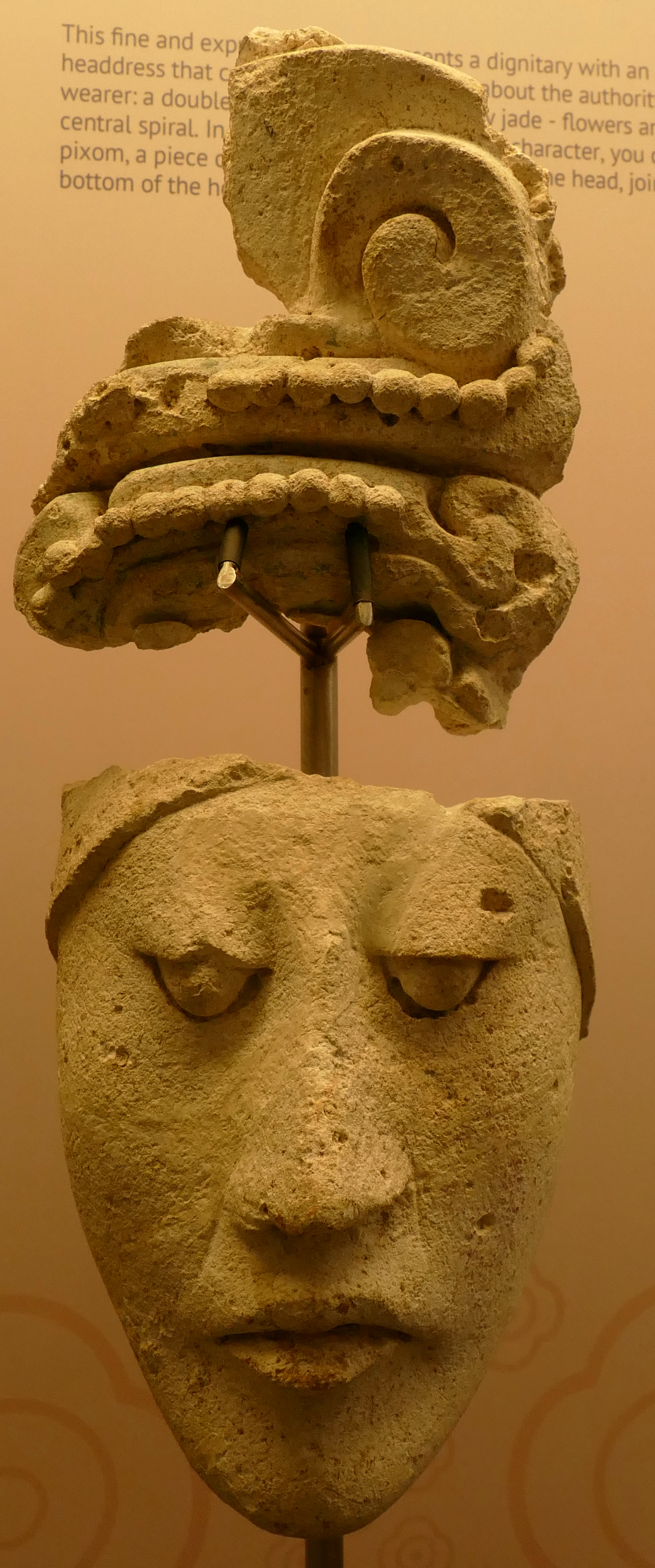
Hormiguero, stucco head ("Maya Akhenaten"), Late Classic (Museo arqueológico Fuerte de S. Miguel, Campeche)

== Mural painting ==
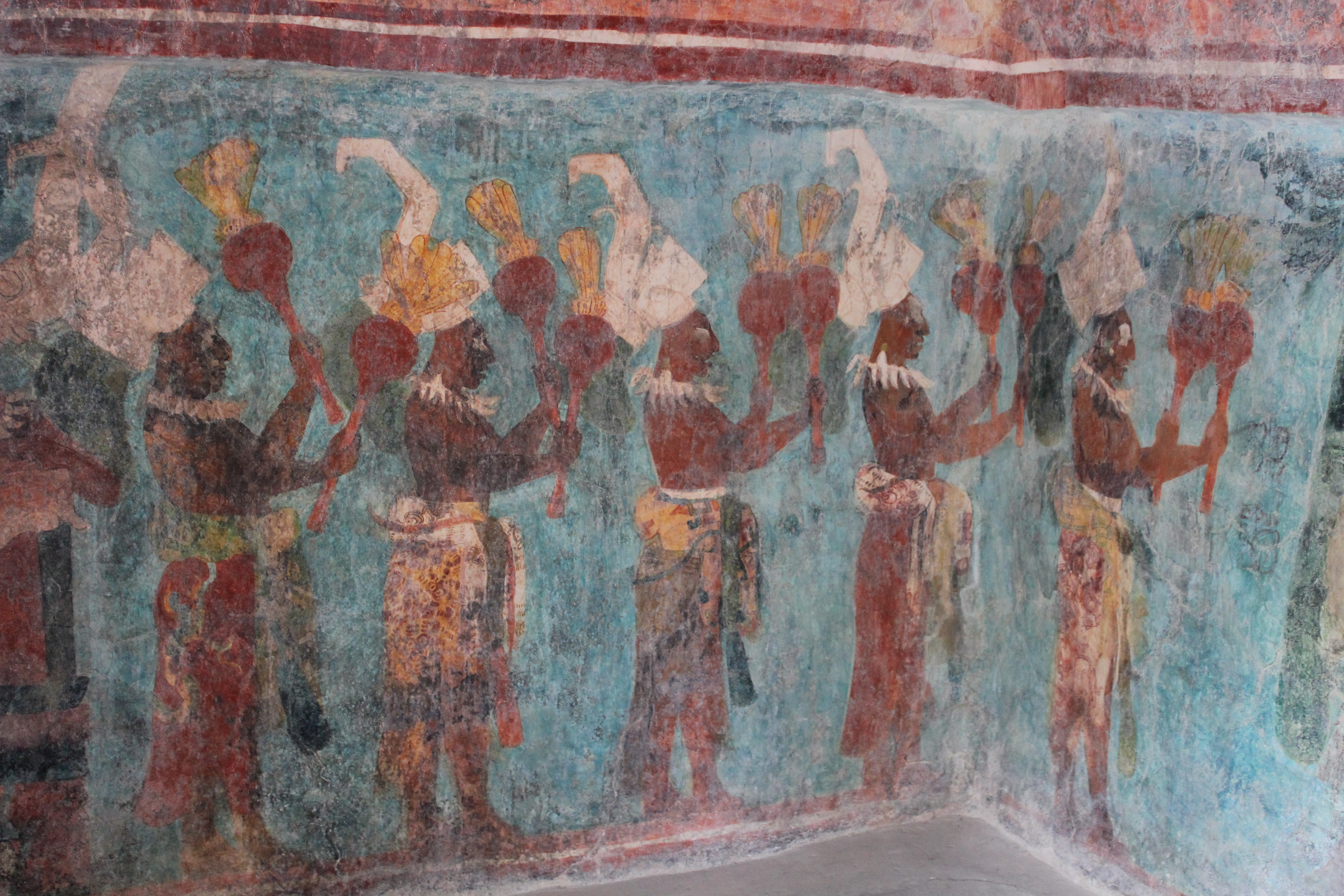
Bonampak mural, room 1, east wall: Musicians

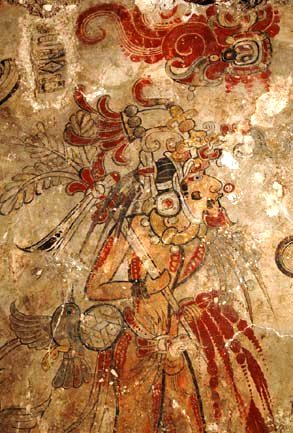
San Bartolo mural: The king as Hunahpu

Although, due to the humid climate of Central America, relatively few Maya paintings have survived to the present day integrally, important remnants have been found in nearly all major court residences. This is especially the case in substructures, hidden under later architectural additions. Mural paintings may show more or less repetitive motifs, such as the subtly varied flower symbols on walls of House E of the Palenque Palace; scenes of daily life, as in one of the buildings surrounding the central square of Calakmul and in a palace of Chilonche; or ritual scenes involving deities, as in the Post-Classic temple murals of Yucatán's and Belize's east coast (Tancah, Tulum, Santa Rita). The latter murals betray a strong influence of the so-called 'Mixteca-Puebla style' once widely spread across Mesoamerica.

Murals may also evince a more narrative character, usually with hieroglyphic captions present. The colourful Bonampak murals, for example, dating from 790 AD, and extending over the walls and vaults of three adjacent rooms, show spectacular scenes of nobility, battle and sacrifice, as well as a group of ritual impersonators in the midst of a file of musicians. At San Bartolo, murals dating from 100 BCE relate to the myths of the Maya maize god and the hero twin Hunahpu, and depict a double inthronization; antedating the Classic Period by several centuries, the style is already fully developed, with colours being subtle and muted as compared to those of Bonampak or Calakmul. Outside the Maya area, in a ward of East-Central Mexican Cacaxtla, murals painted in a predominantly Classic Maya style, with often stark colors, have been found, such as a savage battle scene extending over 20 meters; two figures of Maya lords standing on serpents; and an irrigated maize and cacao field visited by the Maya merchant deity.

Wall painting also occurs on vault capstones, in tombs (e.g., Río Azul), and in caves (e.g., Naj Tunich), usually executed in black on a whitened surface, at times with the additional use of red paint. Yucatec vault capstones often show a depiction of the enthroned lightning deity as a god of agricultural plenty (e.g., Ek' Balam).

A bright turquoise blue colour—'Maya Blue'—has survived through the centuries due to its unique chemical characteristics; this color is present in Bonampak, Cacaxtla, Jaina, El Tajín, and even in some Colonial convents. The use of Maya Blue survived until the 16th century, when the technique was finally lost.

== Writing and bookmaking ==
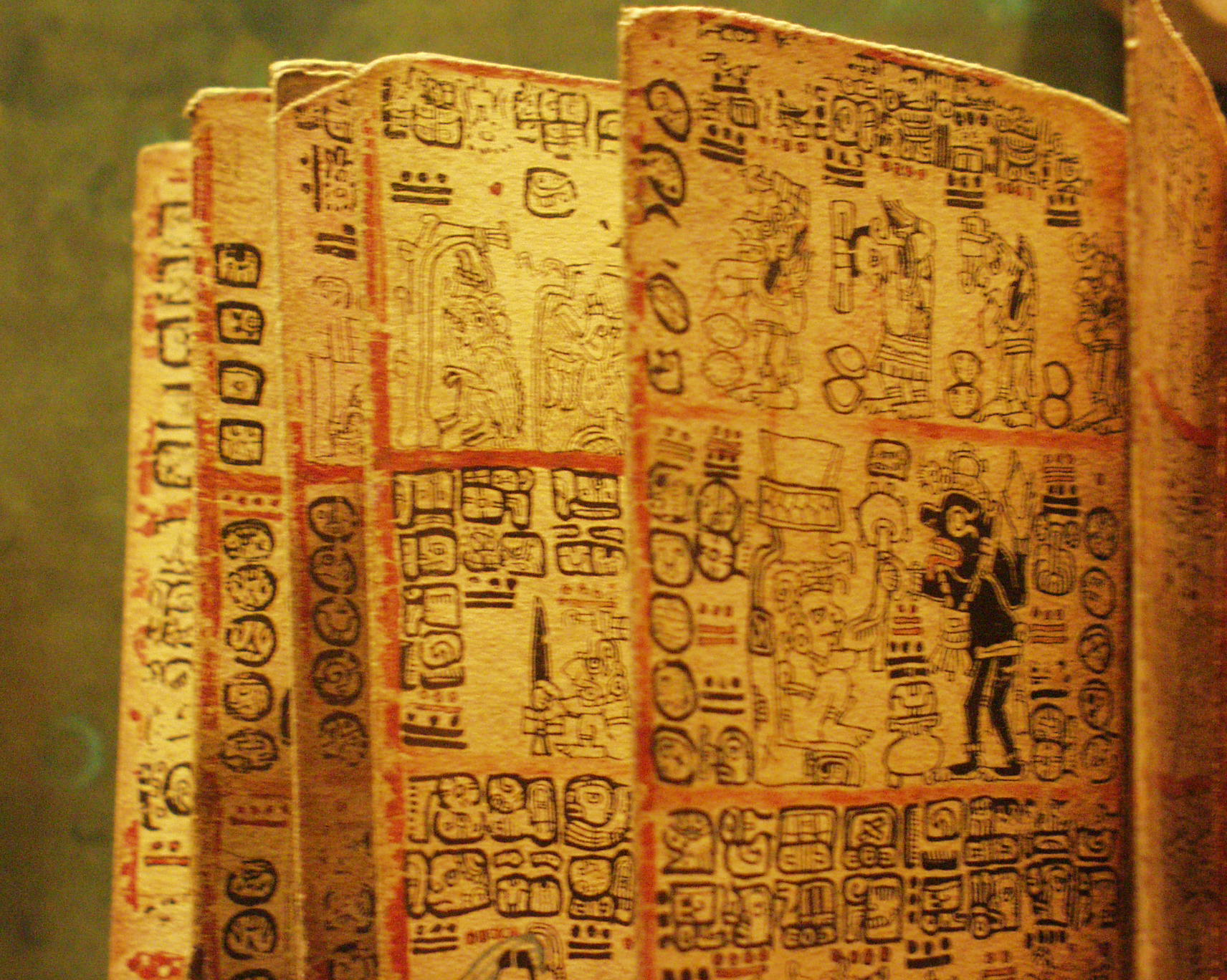
Madrid Codex

The Maya writing system consists of about 1000 distinct characters or hieroglyphs ('glyphs'), and like many ancient writing systems is a mixture of syllabic signs and logograms. This script was in use from the 3rd century BCE until shortly after the Spanish conquest in the 16th century. A considerable proportion of the characters has a reading, but their meaning and configuration as a text is not always understood. The books were folded and consisted of bark paper or leather leaves with an adhesive stucco layer on which to write; they were protected by jaguar skin covers and, perhaps, wooden boards. Since every diviner probably needed a book, there must have existed large numbers of them.

Today, three Maya hieroglyphic books, all from the Post-Classic period, are still in existence: the Dresden, Paris, and Madrid codices. A fourth book, the Grolier, is Maya-Toltec rather than Maya and lacks hieroglyphic texts; fragmentary and of very poor draughtsmanship, it shows many anomalies, reason for which its authenticity has long remained in doubt. These books are largely of a divinatory and priestly nature, containing almanacs, astrological tables, and ritual programs, the Paris Codex also katun-prophecies. Great attention was paid to a harmonious balance of texts and (partly coloured) illustrations.

Besides the codical glyphs, there existed a cursive script of an often dynamic character, found in wall-paintings and on ceramics, and imitated in stone on panels from Palenque (such as the 'Tablet of the 96 glyphs'). Often, written captions are enclosed in square 'boxes' of various shapes within the representation. Wall paintings may also entirely consist of texts (Ek' Balam 'Mural of the 96 glyphs', Naj Tunich cave), or, more rarely, contain astrological computations (Xultun); sometimes, written on a white stuccoed surface, and executed with particular care and elegance, these texts are like enlargements of book pages.

Hieroglyphs are ubiquitous and were written on every available surface, including the human body. The glyphs themselves are highly detailed, and particularly the logograms are deceivingly realistic. As a matter of fact, from an art-historical point of view, they should also be viewed as art motifs, and vice versa. Sculptors at Copan and Quirigua have consequently felt free to convert hieroglyphic elements and calendrical signs into animated, dramatic miniature scenes ('full figure glyphs').

== Ceramics and 'ceramic codex' ==
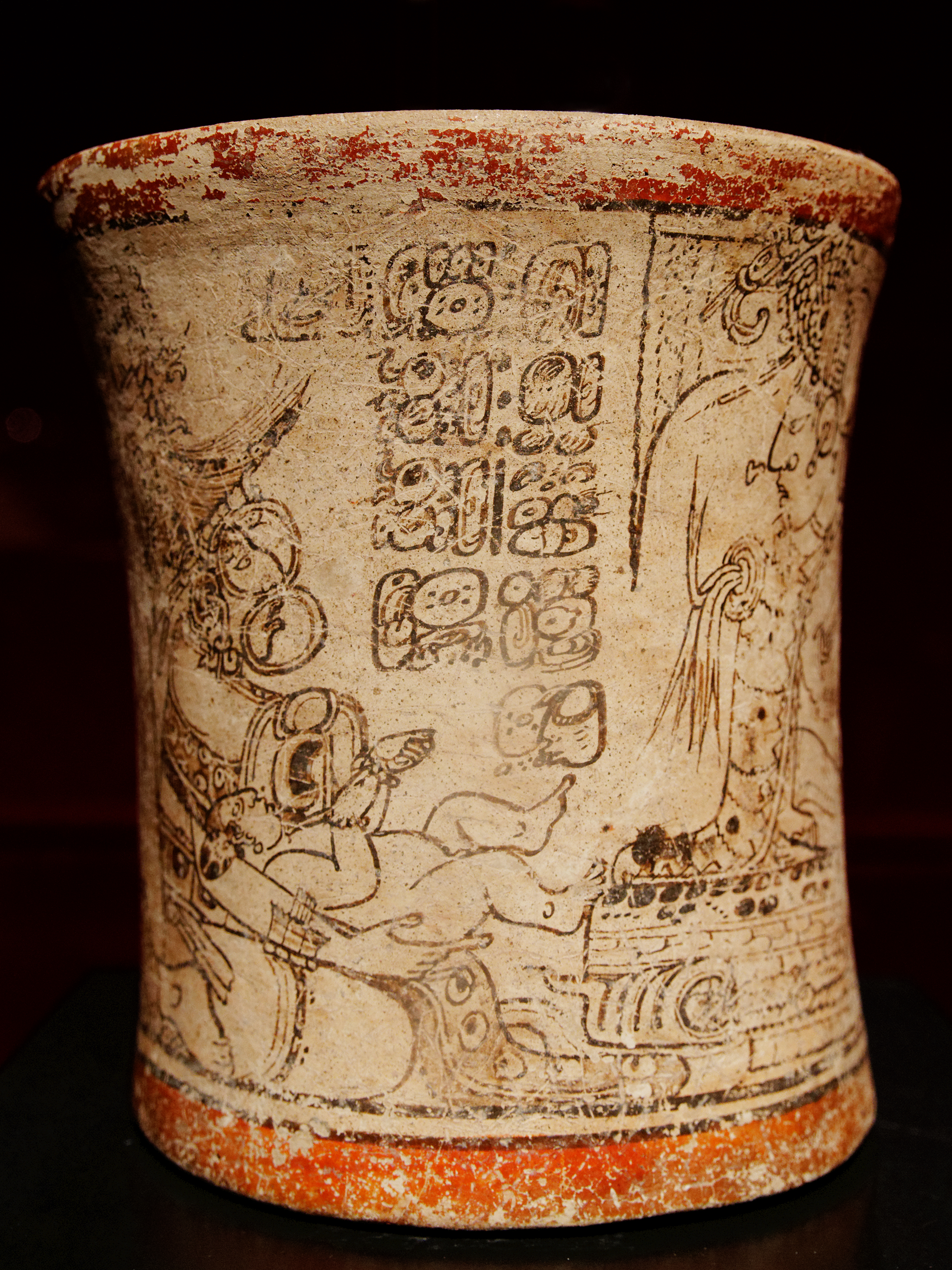
Codex style cylinder vessel, presentation to the king of a baby with jaguar ear

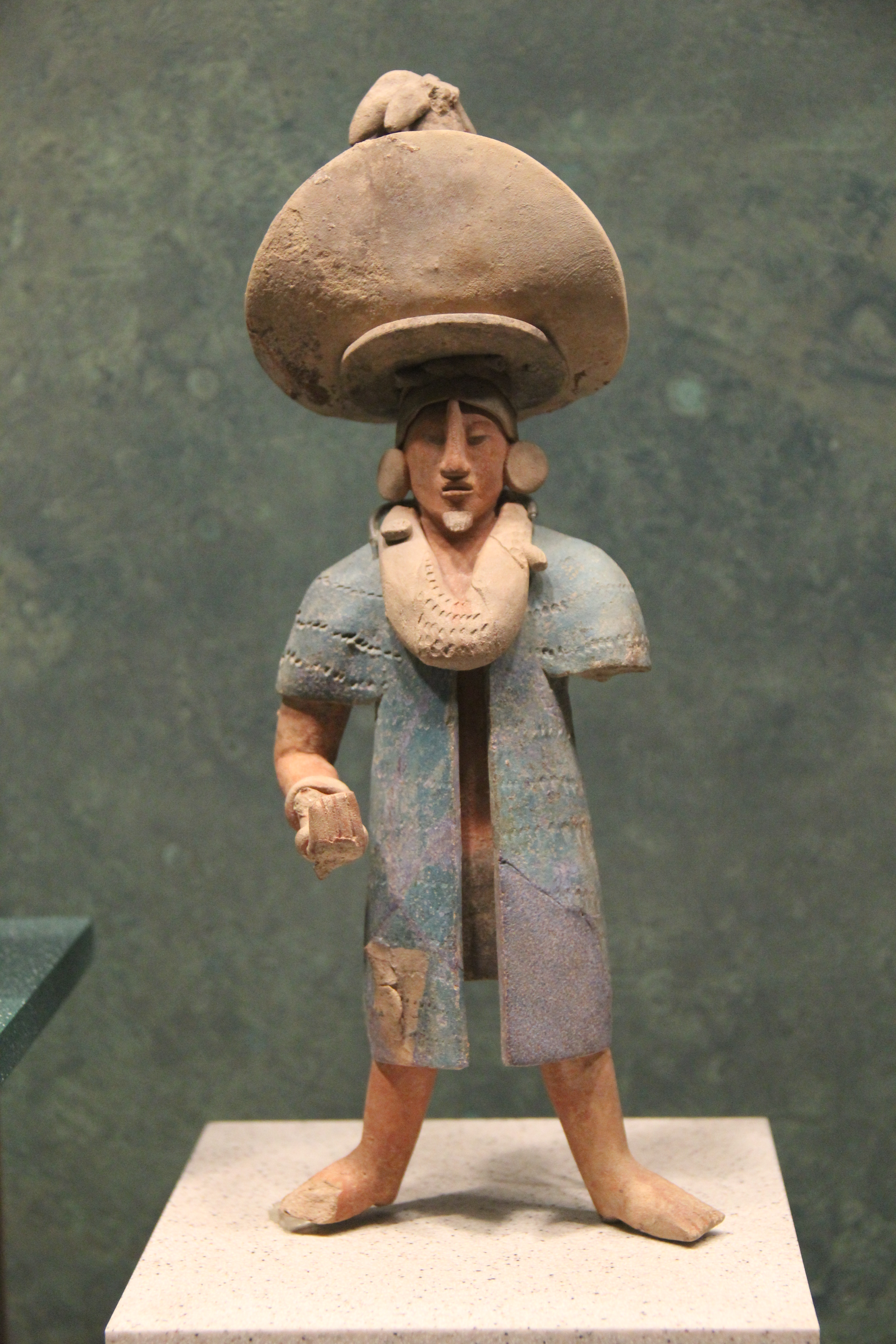
Jaina, nobleman

Unlike utility ceramics found in such large numbers among the debris of archaeological sites, most of the decorated pottery (cylinder vessels, lidded dishes, tripod plates, vases, bowls) once was 'social currency' among the Maya nobility, and, preserved as heirlooms, also accompanied the nobles into their graves. The aristocratic tradition of gift-giving feasts and ceremonial visits, and the emulation that inevitably went with these exchanges, goes a long way towards explaining the high level of artistry reached in Classical times.

Made without a potter's wheel, decorated pottery was delicately painted, carved into relief, incised, or - chiefly during the Early Classic period - made with the Teotihuacan fresco technique of applying paint to a wet clay surface. The precious objects were manufactured in numerous workshops distributed over the Maya kingdoms, some of the most famous being associated with the 'Chama-style', the 'Holmul-style', the so-called 'Ik-style' and, for carved pottery, the 'Chochola-style.'

Vase decoration shows great variation, including palace scenes, courtly ritual, mythology, divinatory glyphs, and even dynastical texts taken from chronicles, and plays a major role in reconstructing Classical Maya life and beliefs. Ceramic scenes and texts painted in black and red on a white underground, the equivalents of pages from the lost folding books, are referred to as being in 'Codex Style' (e.g., the so-called Princeton Vase). The overlap with the three extant hieroglyphic books is (at least up to now) relatively small.

Sculptural ceramic art includes the lids of Early Classic bowls mounted by human or animal figures; some of these bowls, especially those burnished black, are notable for their artistic perfection.

Ceramic sculpture also includes incense burners and burial urns. Best known are the profusely decorated Classic burners from the kingdom of Palenque, which have the modeled face of a deity or of a king attached to an elongated hollow tube. The deity most frequently depicted, the jaguar deity of terrestrial fire, is cognate with the jaguar deity often adorning large Classic burial urns from the Guatemalan department of El Quiché. The elaborate Post-Classic, mold-made effigy incense burners especially associated with Mayapan represent standing deities (or priestly deity impersonators) often carrying offerings.

Finally, figurines, often mold-made, and of an amazing liveliness and realism, constitute a minor but highly informative genre. Apart from deities, animal persons, rulers and dwarfs, they show many other characters as well as scenes taken from daily life. Some of these figurines are ocarinas and may have been used in rituals. The most impressive examples stem from Jaina Island.

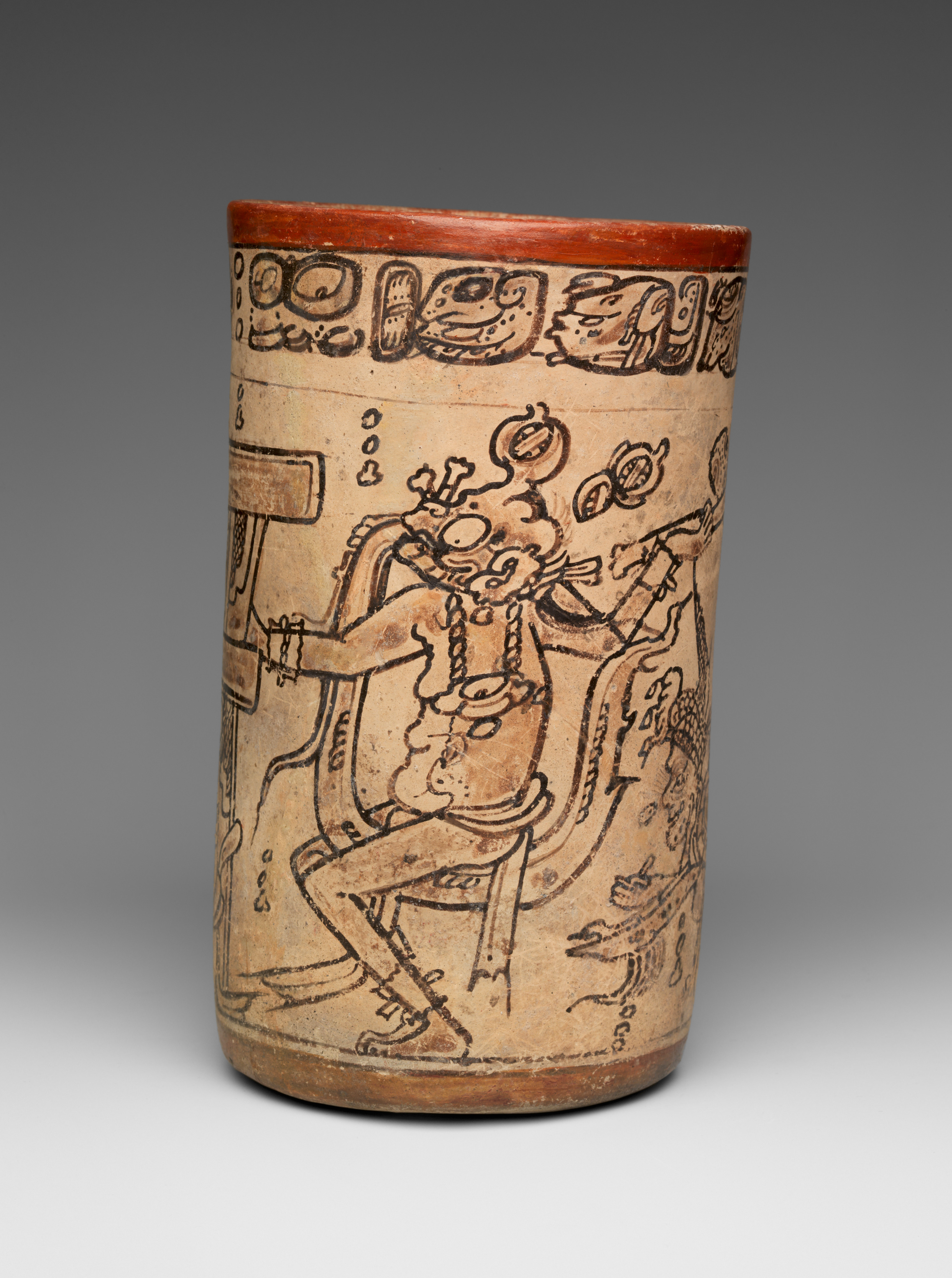
Codex-style vase with mythological scene, 7th–8th century (Metropolitan Museum of Art)

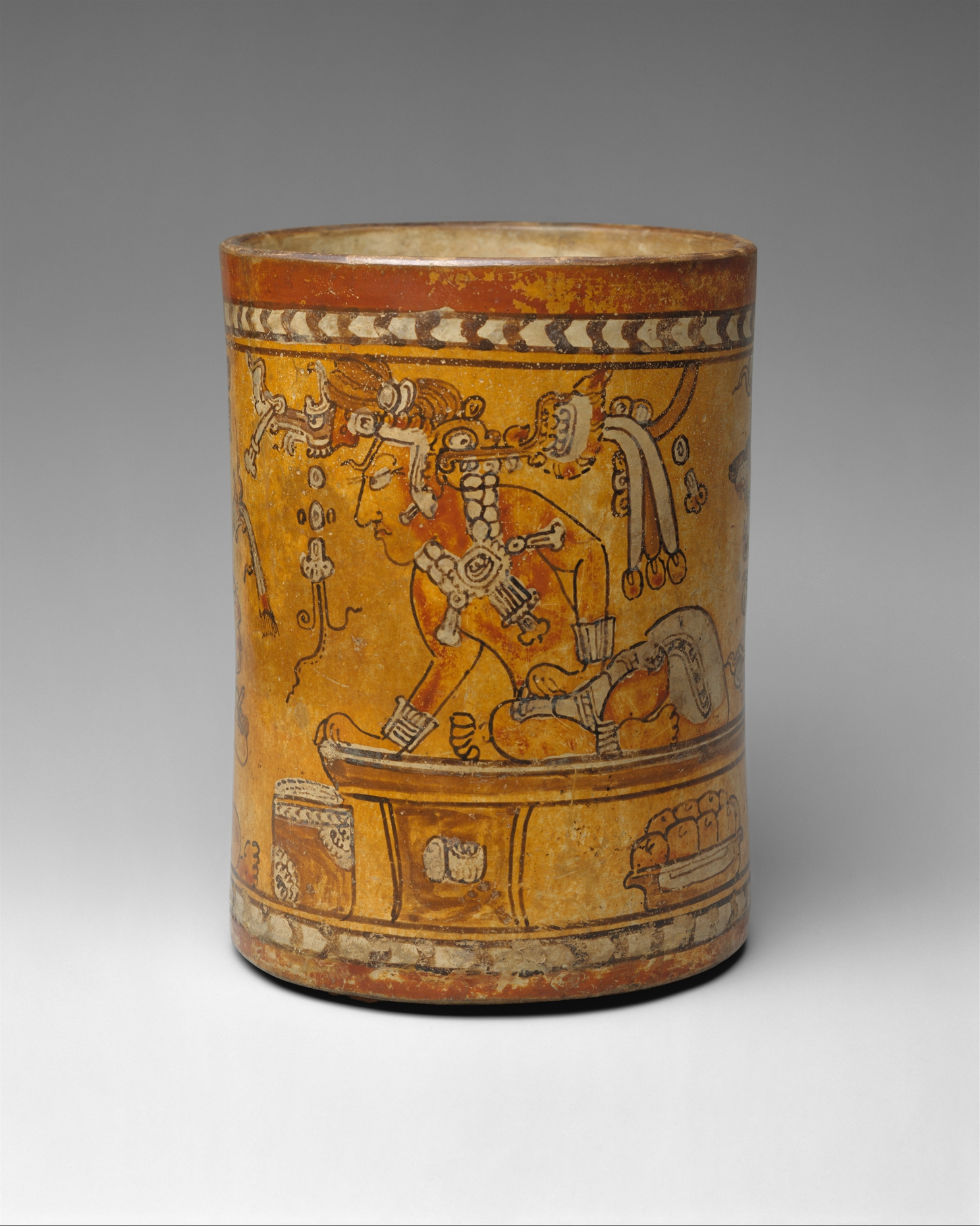
Vessel with throne scene, Chamá style, late 7th–8th century (Metropolitan Museum of Art)

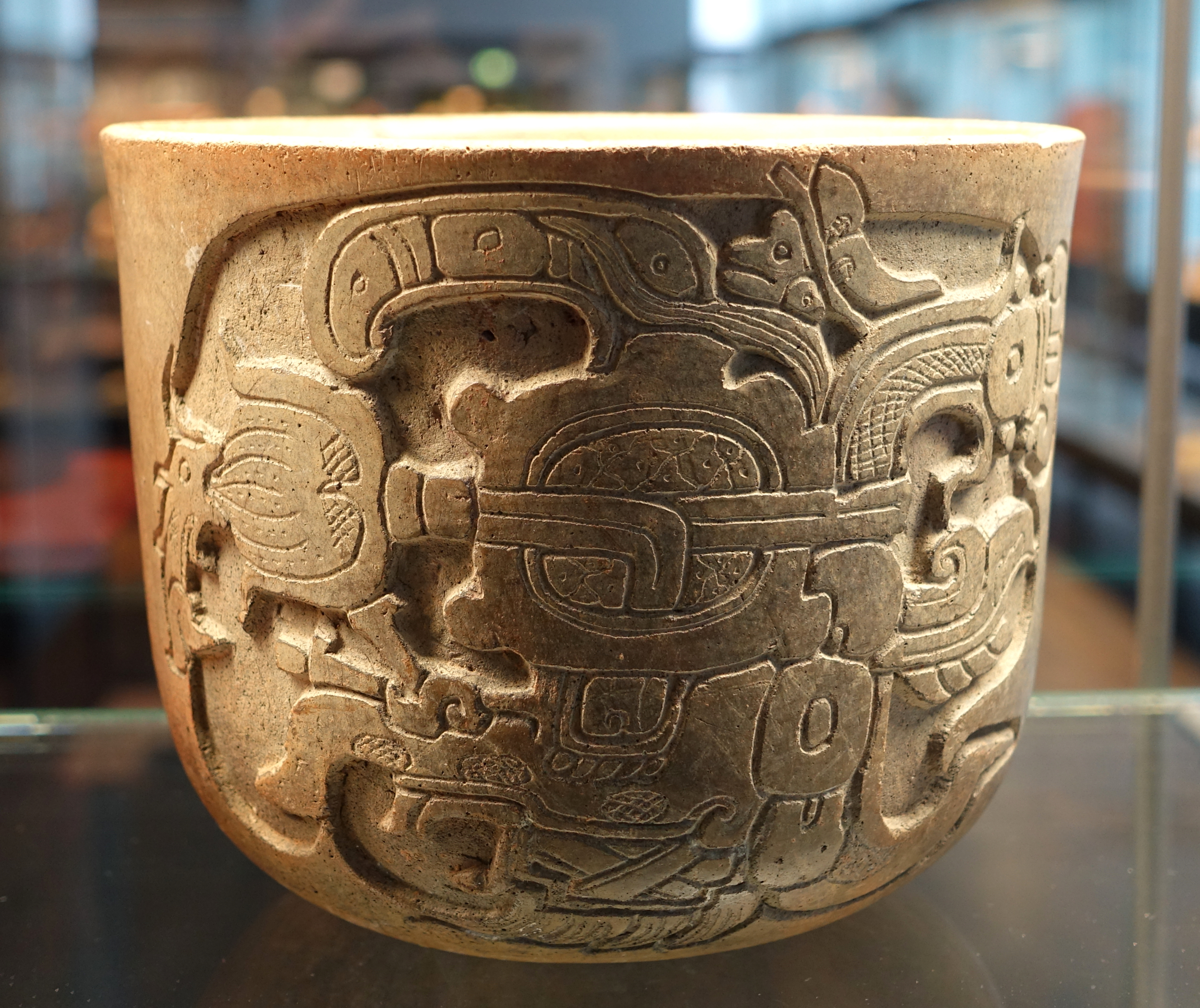
Relief vase with head of aquatic serpent, Chocholá style, Yucatan, Late Classic (Ethnologisches Museum, Berlin)

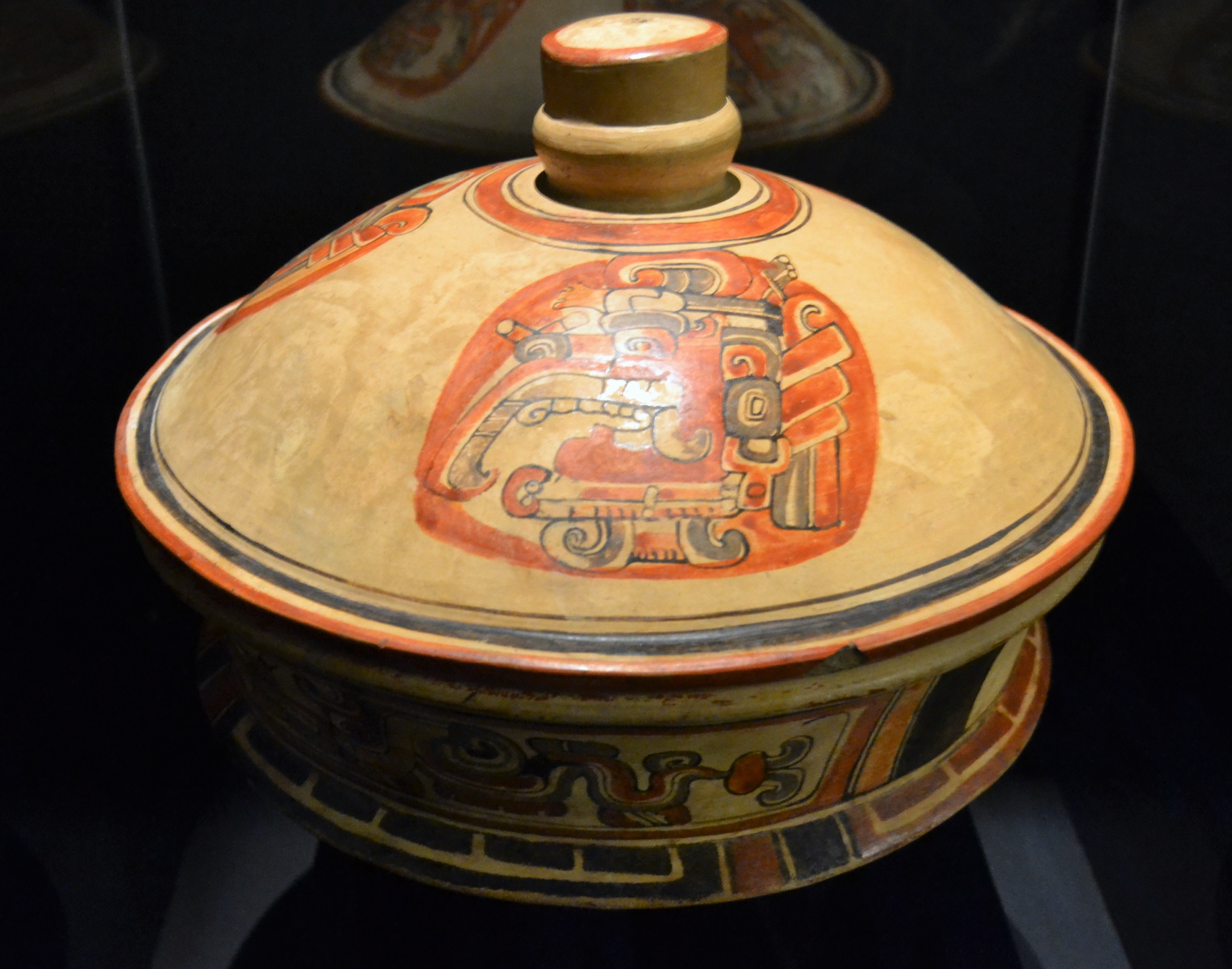
Lidded basal flange bowl, El Peru, Guatemala, Early Classic (Museo Nacional de Arqueología y Etnología de Guatemala)

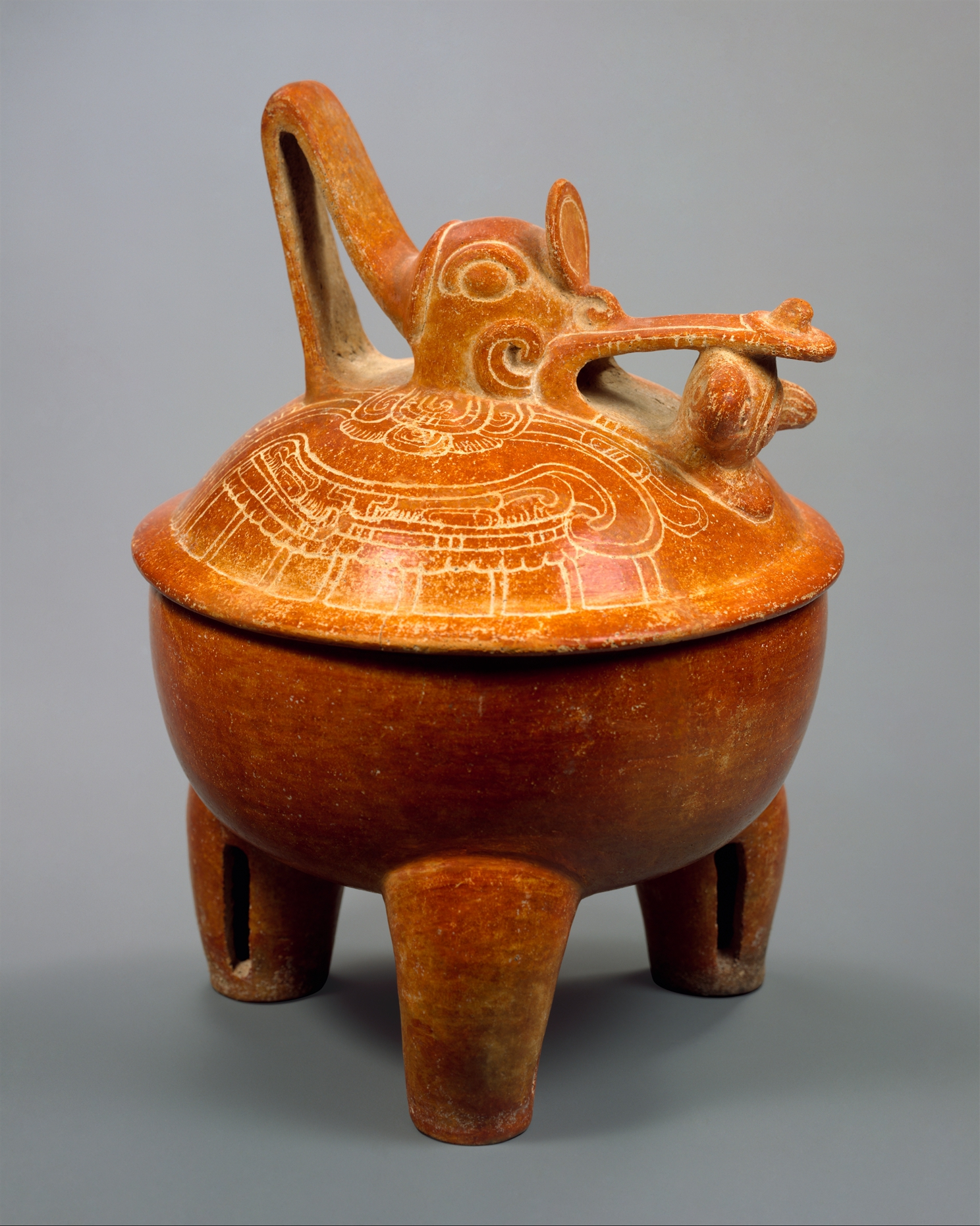
Tripod bowl with heron lid, Early Classic (Metropolitan Museum of Art)

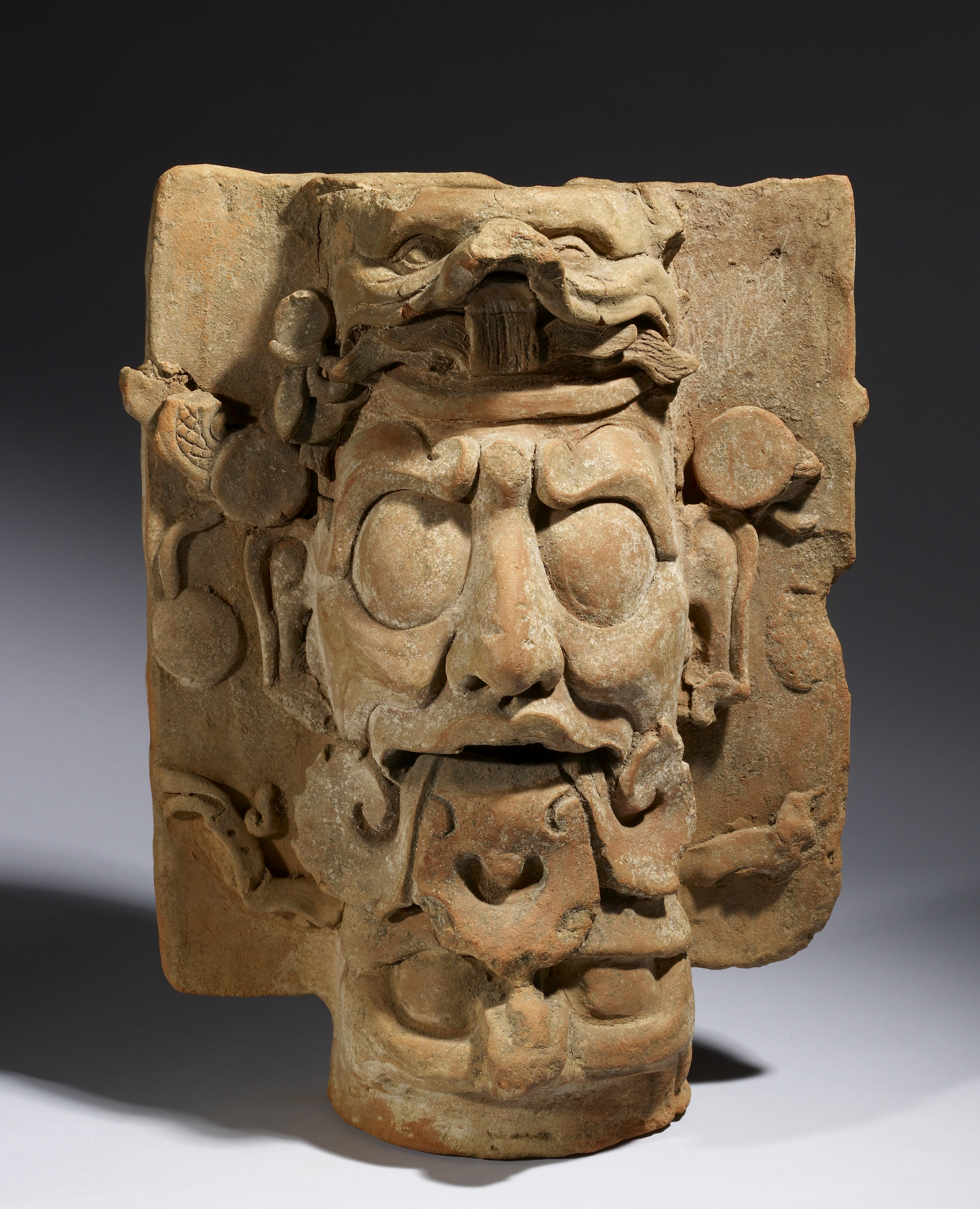
Lower part of incense burner, Palenque style, Late Classic (Walters Art Museum)

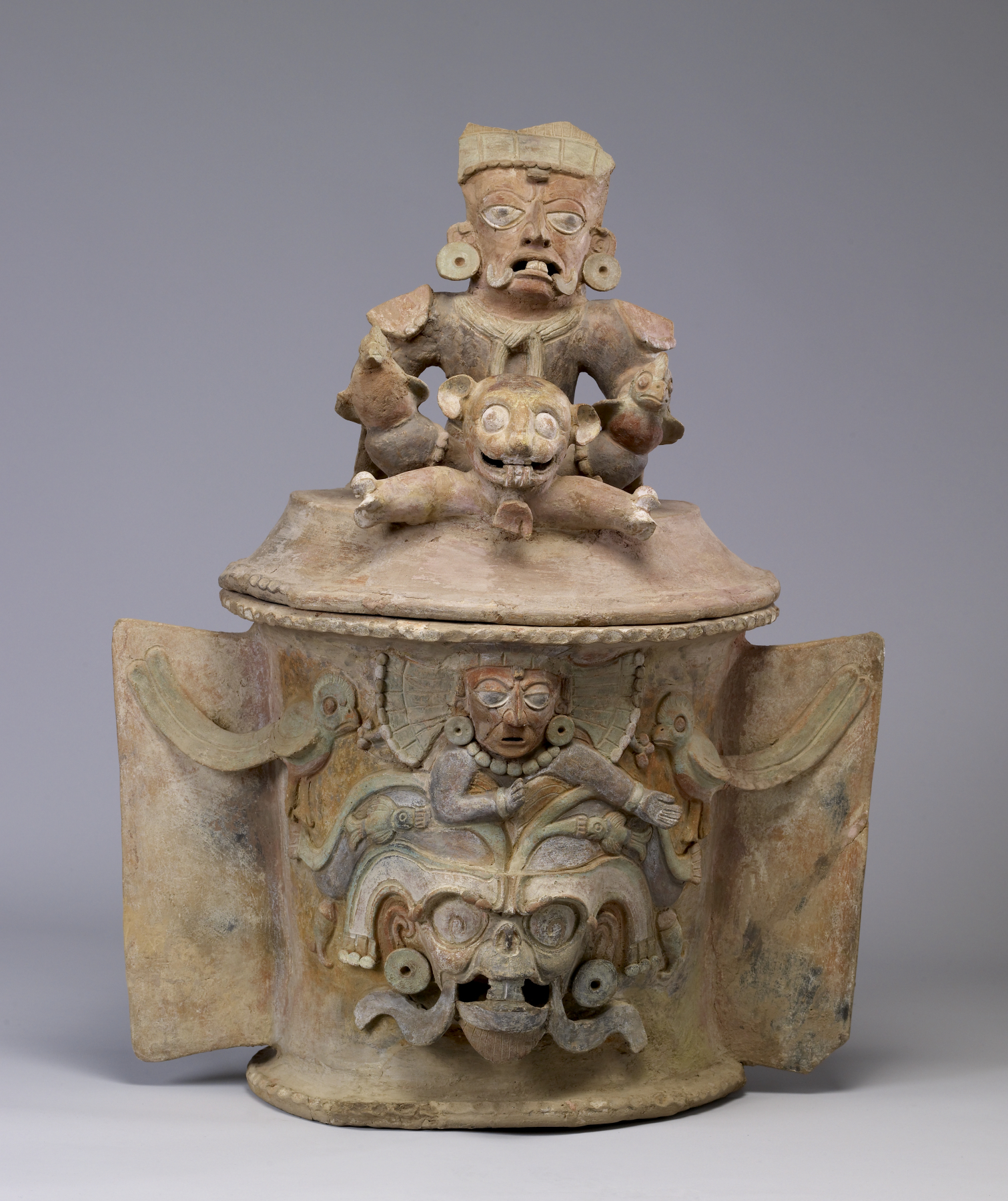
Urn with jaguar deity lid, Late Classic (Walters Art Museum)

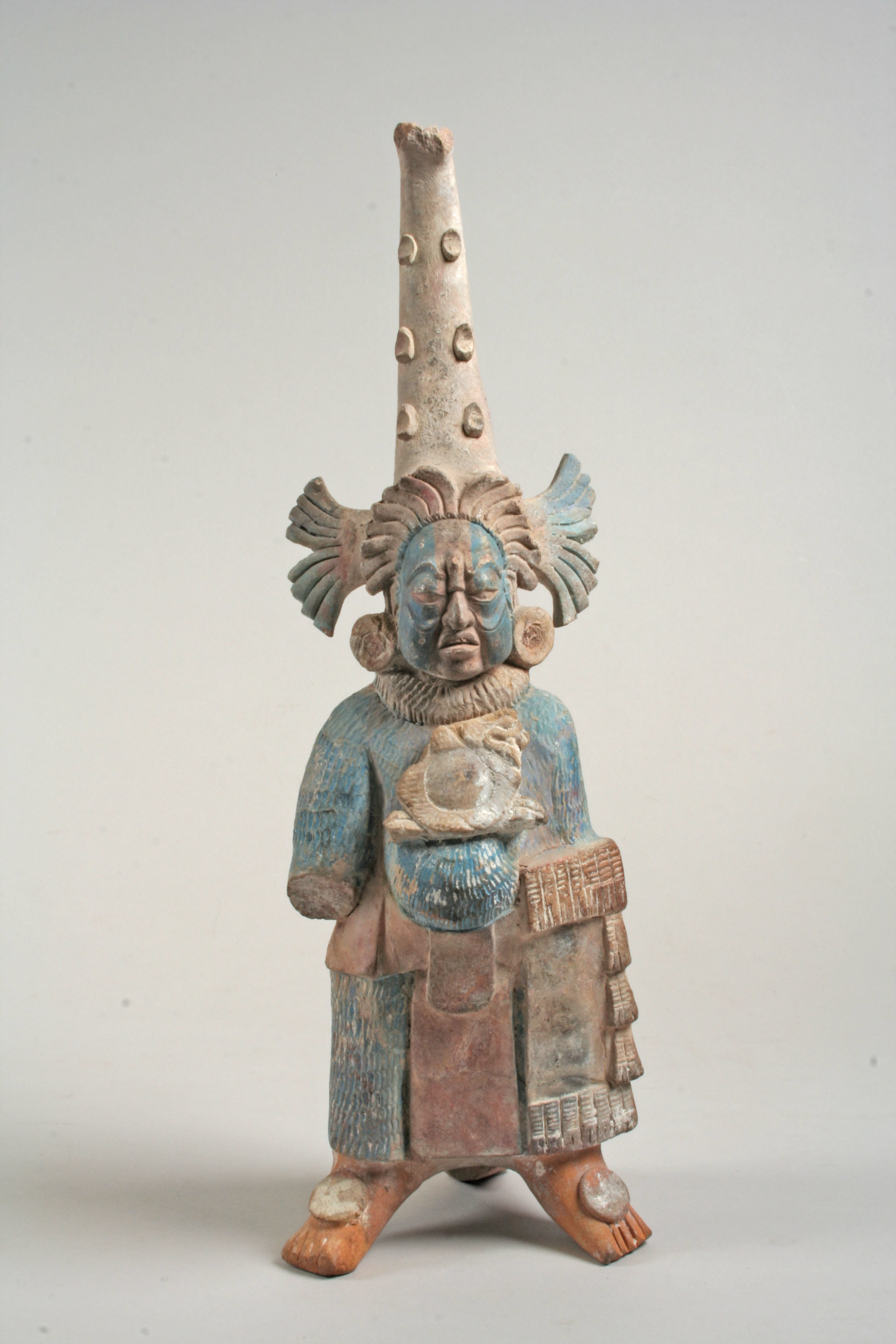
Costumed figure, 7th–8th century (Metropolitan Museum of Art)

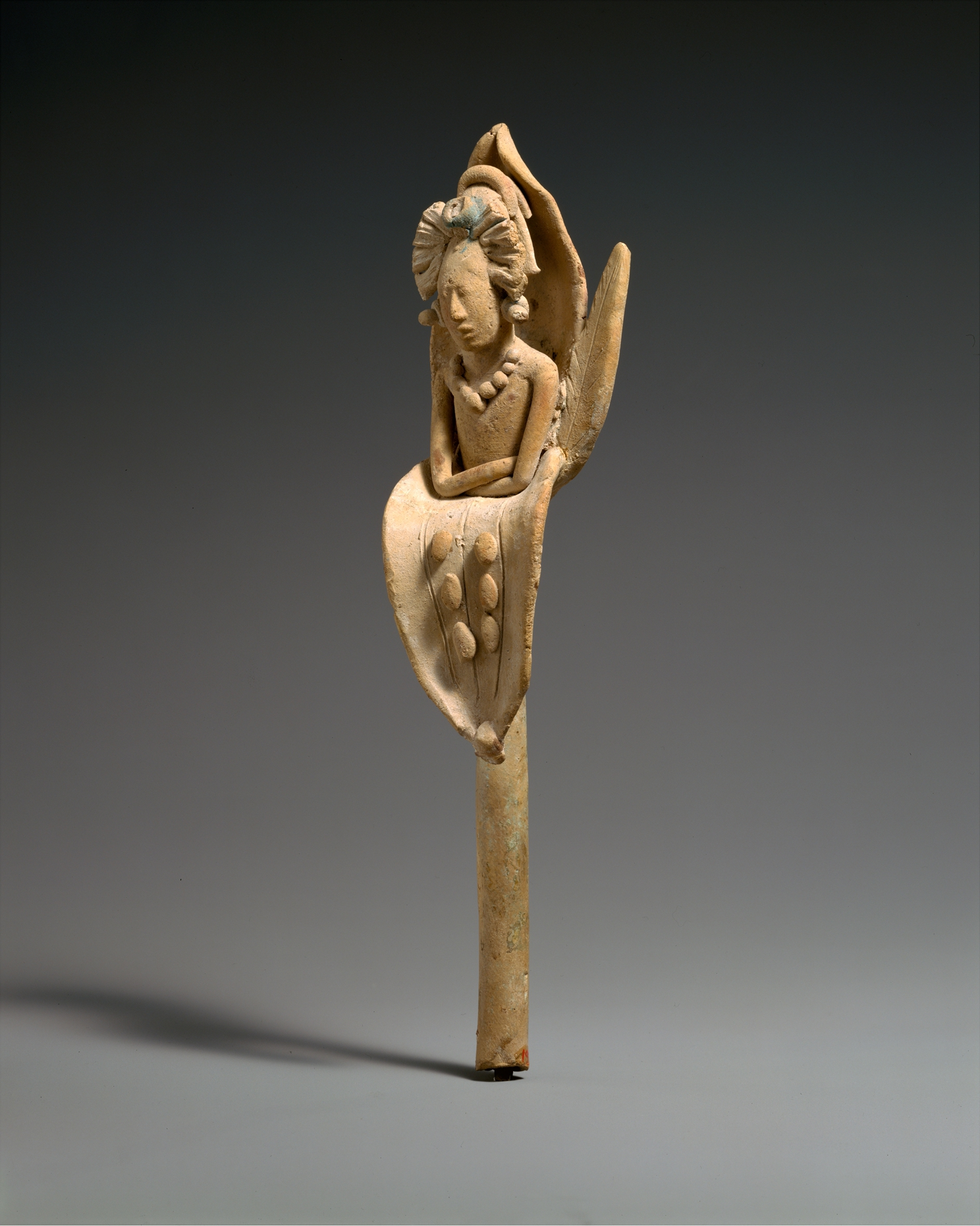
Young nobleman as a flower, Jaina style, 8th century (Metropolitan Museum of Art)

== Precious stone and other sculpted materials ==
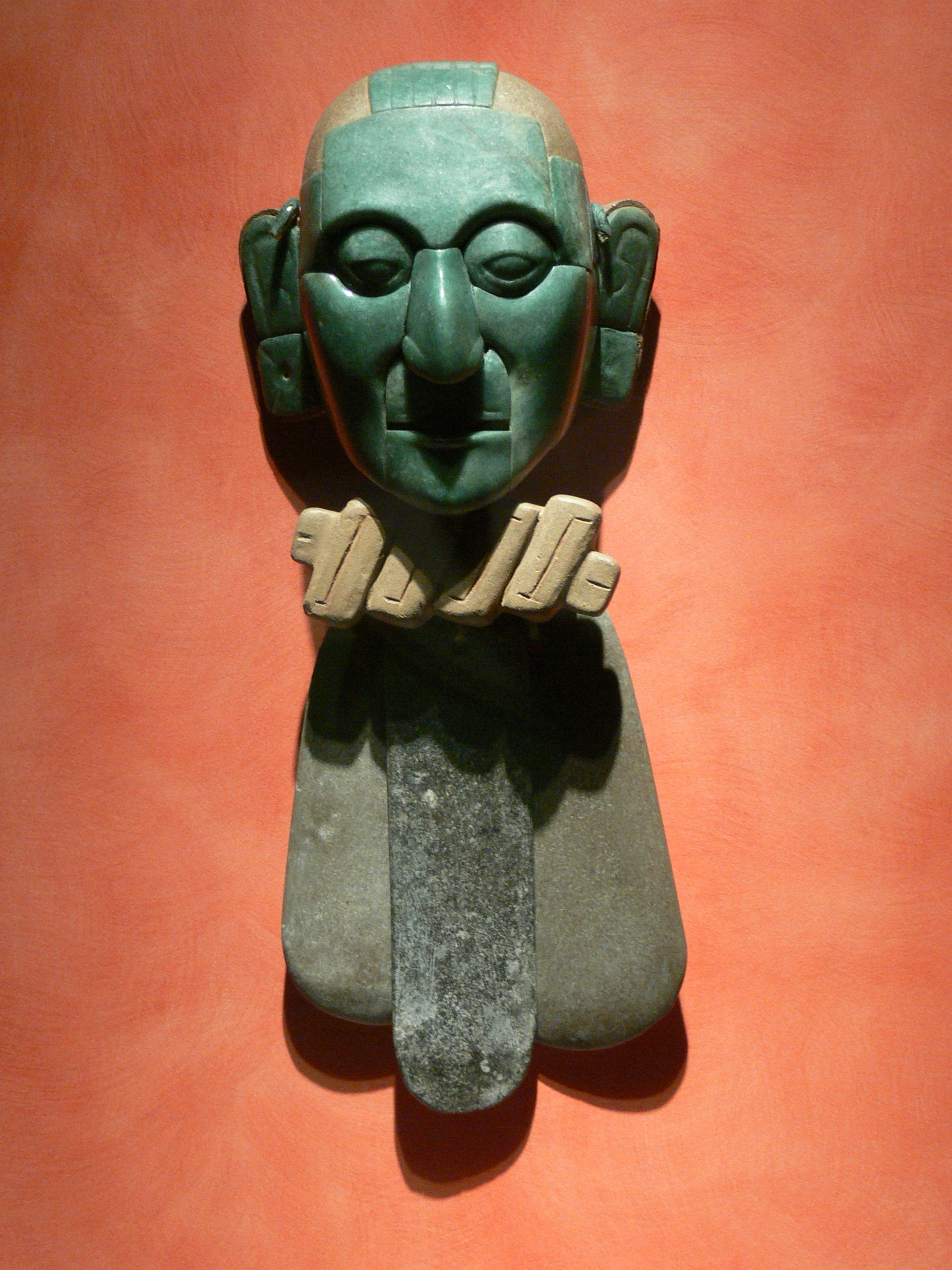
Marble belt assemblage with celt pendants, from the tomb of king Pakal, Palenque

It is remarkable that the Maya, who had no metal tools, created many objects from a very hard and dense material, jade (jadeite), particularly all sorts of (royal) dress elements, such as belt plaques, Celts, ear spools, pendants, and also masks. Celts (i.e., flat, axe-shaped ornaments) were sometimes engraved with a stela-like representation of the king (e.g., the Early-Classic 'Leyden Plate'). The best-known example of a mask is probably the death mask of the Palenque king Pakal, covered with irregularly-shaped jade plaques and having eyes made from mother-of-pearl and obsidian; another death mask, belonging to a Palenque queen, consists of malachite plaques. Similarly, certain cylindrical vases from Tikal have an outer layer of square jade discs. Many stone carvings had jade inlays.

Among other sculpted and engraved materials are flint, chert, shell, and bone, often found in caches and burials. The so-called 'eccentric flints' are ceremonial objects of uncertain use, in their most elaborate forms of elongated shape with usually various heads extending on one or both sides, sometimes those of the lightning deity, but more often of an anthropomorphic lightning probably representing the Tonsured Maize God. Shell was worked into disks and other decorative elements showing human, possibly ancestral heads and deities; conch trumpets were similarly decorated. Human and animal bones were decorated with incised symbols and scenes. A collection of small and modified, tubular bones from an 8th-century royal burial under Tikal Temple I contains some of the most subtle engravings known from the Maya, including several scenes with the Tonsured maize god in a canoe.

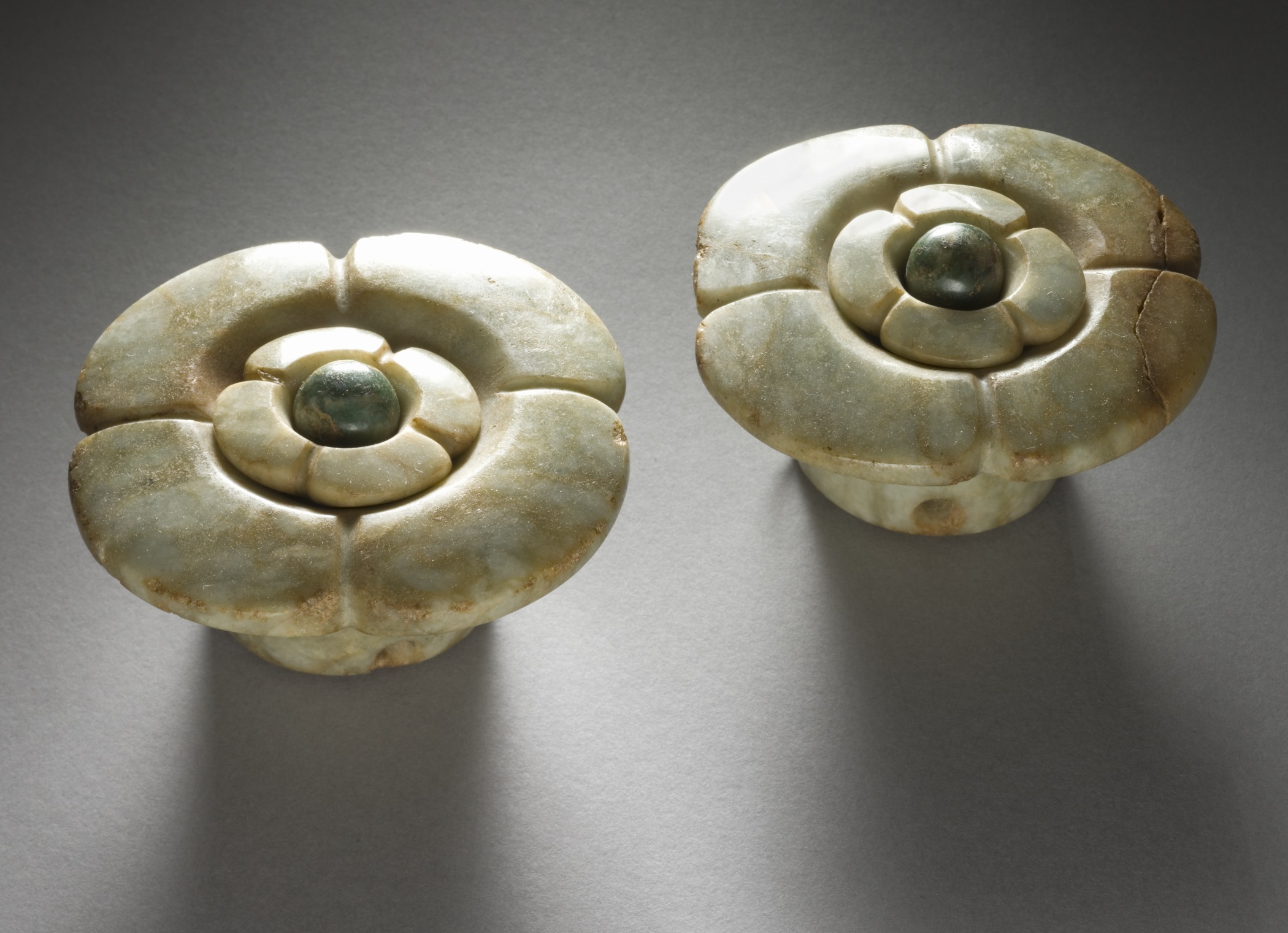
Flower-shaped jadeite earflares, Late Classic (Los Angeles County Museum of Art)

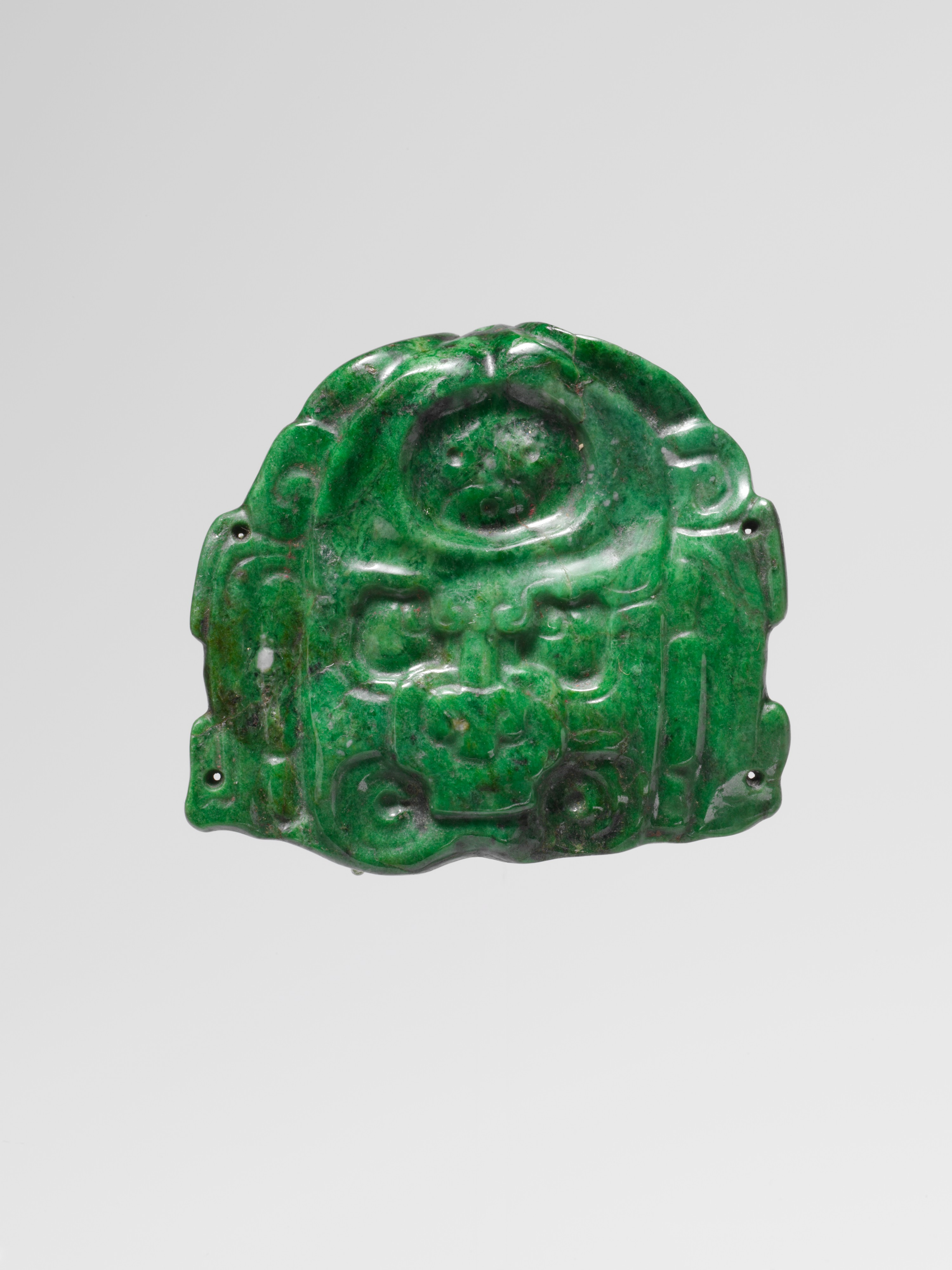
Jadeite deity face pendant, 7th–8th century (Metropolitan Museum of Art)

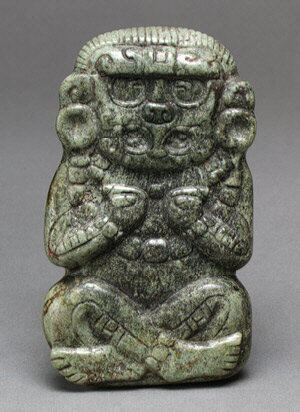
Jadeite rain deity with arms in royal posture, Early Classic (Metropolitan Museum of Art)

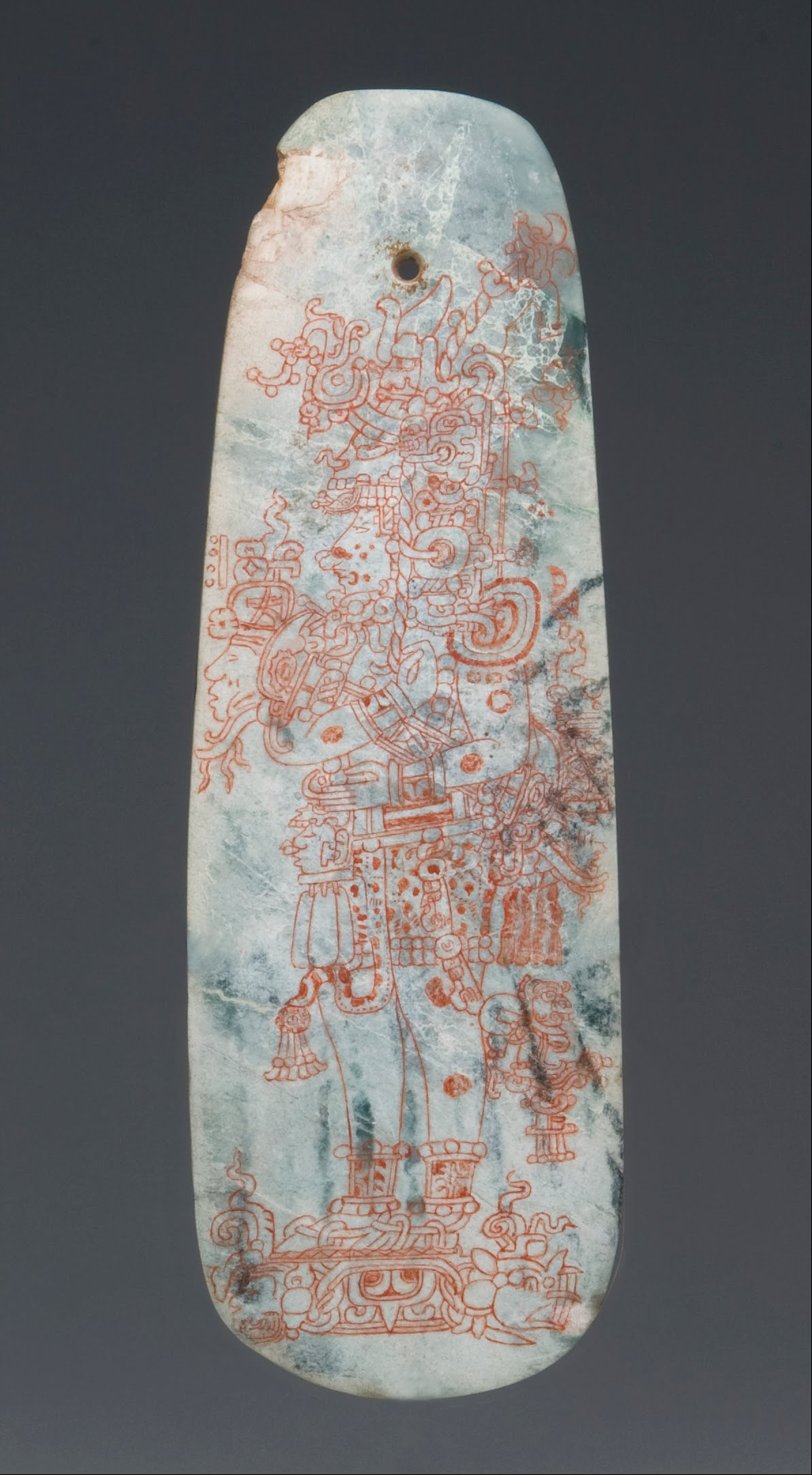
Jade belt plaque with ruler, Early Classic (Kimbell Art Museum)

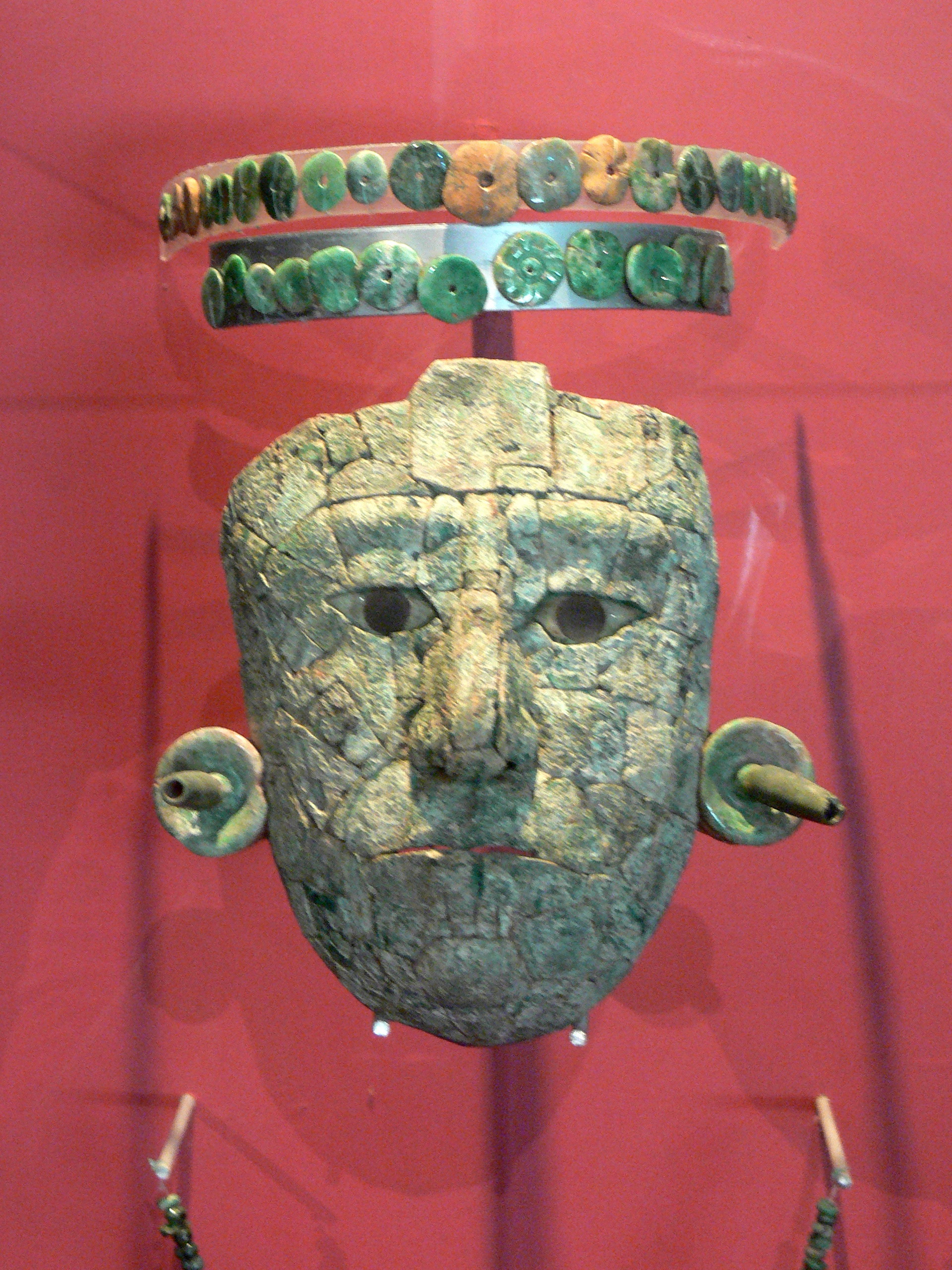
Funerary mask of a Palenque queen covered with pieces of malachite, 7th century (site museum)

== Applied arts and body decoration ==
Textiles from the Classic period, made of cotton, have not survived, but Maya art provides detailed information about their appearance and, to a lesser extent, their social function. They include delicate fabrics used as wrappings, curtains and canopies furnishing palaces, and garments. Among the dyeing techniques may have been ikat. Daily costume depended on social standing. Noblewomen usually wore long dresses, noblemen girdles and breechcloths, leaving legs and upper body more or less bare, unless jackets or mantles were worn. Both men and women could wear turbans. Costumes worn on ceremonial occasions and during the many festivities were highly expressive and exuberant; animal headdresses were common. The most elaborate costume was the formal apparel of the king, as depicted on the royal stelae, with numerous elements of symbolic meaning.

Wickerwork, only known from incidental depictions in sculptural and ceramic art, must once have been ubiquitous; the well-known pop ('mat') motif testifies to its importance.

Body decorations often consisted of painted patterns on face and body, but could also be of a permanent character marking status and age differences. The latter type included artificial deformation of the skull, filing and incrustation of the teeth, and tattooing of the face.

== Museum collections ==
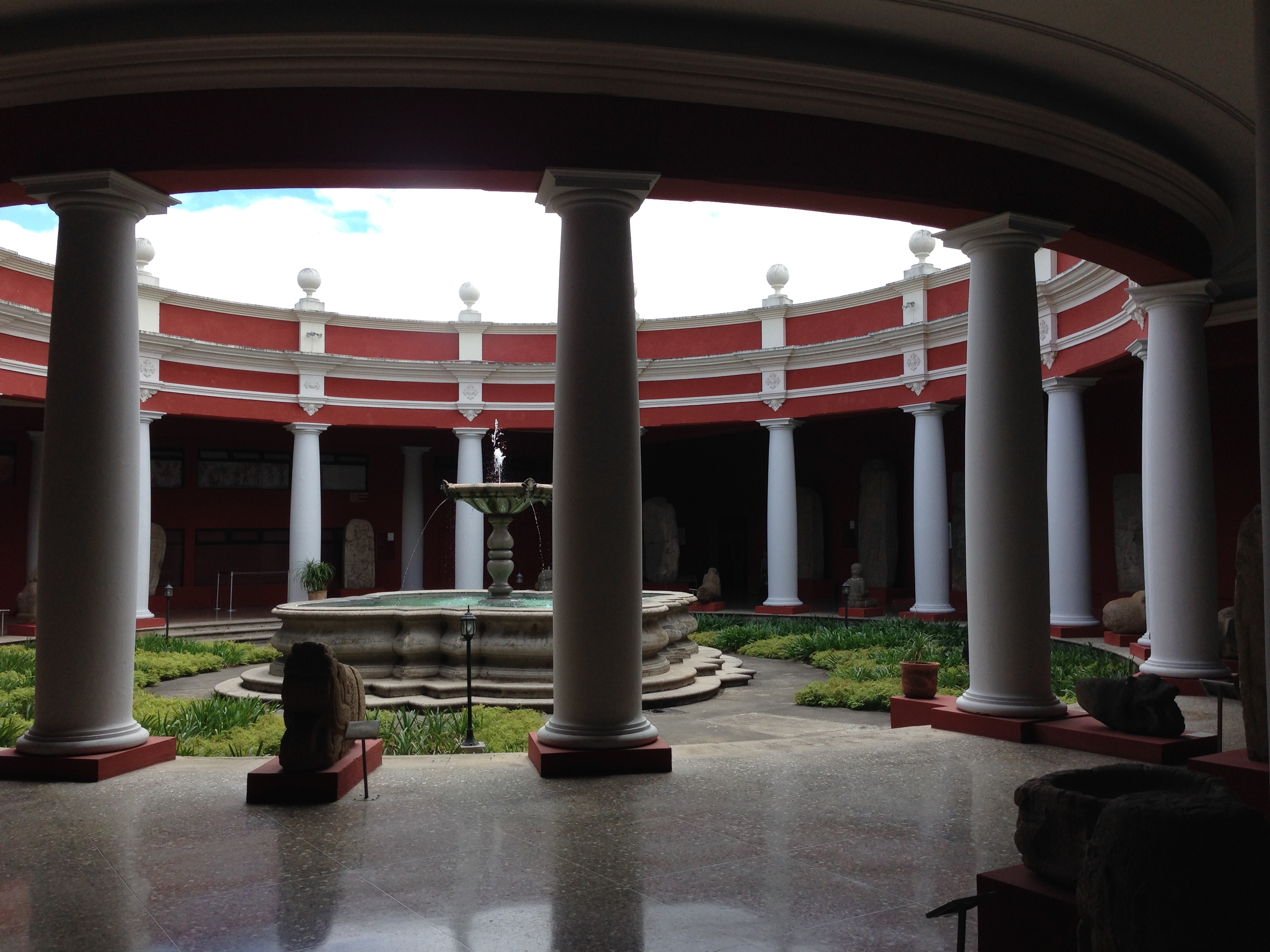
The Museo Nacional de Arqueología y Etnología, in Guatemala City

There are a great many museums across the world with Maya artifacts in their collections. The Foundation for the Advancement of Mesoamerican Studies lists over 250 museums in its Maya Museum database, and the European Association of Mayanists lists just under 50 museums in Europe alone.

In Mexico City, the Museo Nacional de Antropología contains an especially large selection of Maya artifacts. An increasing number of regional museums in Mexico hold important collections, including Museo Amparo in Puebla, with its famous throne back from Chiapas; the Museo de las Estelas "Román Piña Chan" in Campeche; the Museo Regional de Yucatán "Palacio Cantón" and the "Gran Museo del mundo maya", both in Mérida; and the Museo Regional de Antropología "Carlos Pellicer Camera" in Villahermosa, Tabasco.

In Guatemala, the most important museum collections are those of the Museo Popol Vuh and the Museo Nacional de Arqueología y Etnología, both in Guatemala City. The Ruta Maya Foundation regularly organizes exhibitions from its own collection of retrieved art objects, part of which were formerly held by the private 'El Príncipe maya' museum of Cobán. In Belize, Maya artefacts can be found in the Museum of Belize and the Bliss Institute; in Honduras, in the Copan Sculpture Museum and in the Galería Nacional de Arte, Tegucigalpa.

In the United States, almost every major art museum has a collection of Maya artifacts, often including stone monuments. Among the more important east coast collections are those of the Metropolitan Museum of Art in New York; the Museum of Fine Arts, Boston; the Princeton University Art Museum; the Peabody Museum of Archaeology and Ethnology in Cambridge, Massachusetts; the Dumbarton Oaks collection; and the University of Pennsylvania Museum of Archaeology and Anthropology, with its famous inaugural stela 14 of Piedras Negras. On the west coast, the De Young Museum of San Francisco and the Los Angeles County Museum of Art (LACMA), with its large collection of painted Maya ceramics, are important. Other notable collections include the Cleveland Museum of Art in Ohio and the Art Institute of Chicago.

In Europe, the British Museum in London exhibits a series of famous Yaxchilan lintels, and the Museum der Kulturen in Basel, Switzerland, a number of wooden lintels from Tikal. The Ethnologisches Museum in Berlin holds a broad selection of Maya artifacts, including a famous Early-Classic incised vase showing a king lying in state and awaiting post-mortem transformation. The Museo de América in Madrid hosts the Madrid Codex as well as a large selection of artifacts from Palenque. Other notable Maya collections are found in the Musée du Quai Branly, Paris; the Musées royaux d'art et d'histoire, Brussels; the Rijksmuseum voor Volkenkunde in Leiden, Netherlands, second home to the Leyden Plate; and the Rietberg Museum in Zürich, Switzerland.

== Maya performative arts ==
- Maya dance
- Maya dance drama
- Maya music

== See also ==
- Ancient Maya graffiti
- Pre-Columbian art
- Painting in the Americas before Colonization
- Visual arts by indigenous peoples of the Americas
