= Cival =

Archaeological site in Petén, Guatemala

Coordinates: 17°22′03″N 89°15′33″W

Cival is an archaeological site in the Petén Basin region of the southern Maya lowlands, which was formerly a major city of the Pre-Columbian Maya civilization. It is located in the present-day Department of Petén, Guatemala.

The site flourished from about the 6th century B.C. through the 1st century C.E., during the Preclassic Period (see: Mesoamerican chronology). It may have had a peak population of some 10,000 people.

The site is about 25 miles (40 km) east of Tikal, on a ridge over the left bank of the Holmul river.

The site has temples on step pyramids and plazas arranged to point to astronomical events such as the equinox sunrise, and is surrounded by a defensive wall. The site's largest step pyramid is 27 metres high and 70 x 40 metres wide. Some buildings were decorated with stucco sculptures depicting Mesoamerican deities.

The site was long lost in the jungle, and was discovered and partly plundered by looters around 1980. It was first mapped by explorer Ian Graham in 1984, who gave it the name Cival after a local word for "lagoon". The ancient name of the site is currently unknown.

Archaeological excavations of the site began in 2001 and are ongoing as of 2004, led by Dr. Francisco Estrada-Belli. The project there originally began as part of investigations at the nearby Classic Maya site of Holmul, but attention was shifted to Cival as Cival's age and importance became apparent. The excavations are sponsored by Vanderbilt University and the National Geographic Society, the Foundation for the Advancement of Mesoamerican Studies, the Ahau Foundation, ARB, Interco Tire, PIAA and Warn Industries.

Investigations at Cival have added to knowledge of the Pre-Classic Maya, including revealing the earliest inscriptions with Maya calendar dates and showing dynastic succession of monarchs.

Some news reports have incorrectly stated that Pre-Classic Maya cities were previously unknown. Pre-Classic buildings in the Peten have been excavated by archaeologists since the work at Uaxactun in the 1920s, and the major breakthrough which revealed that the Pre-Classic Maya were more highly developed and urbanized in this era than had long been thought was the archaeological project at El Mirador starting in the late 1970s.
