= Mesoamerica =

Pre-Columbian cultural area in the Americas

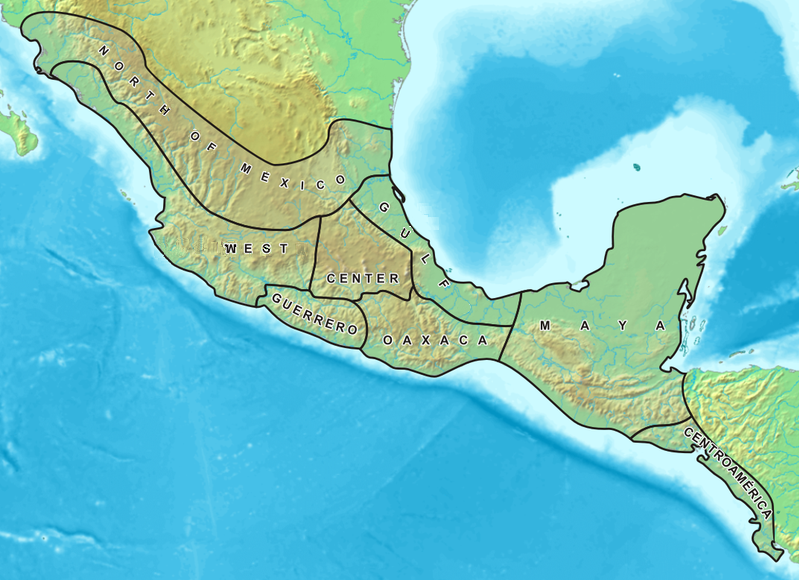
Cultural areas of Mesoamerica

Mesoamerica is a historical region and cultural area comprising the modern-day lands of central and southern Mexico, all of Belize, Guatemala, El Salvador, western Honduras, and the Greater Nicoya region of Nicaragua and Costa Rica. As a cultural area, Mesoamerica is defined by a mosaic of cultural traits developed and shared by its indigenous cultures.

In the pre-Columbian era, indigenous societies flourished in Mesoamerica for more than 3,000 years before the Spanish colonization of the Americas began on Hispaniola in 1493. In world history, Mesoamerica was the site of two historical transformations: (i) primary urban generation, and (ii) the formation of New World cultures from the mixture of the indigenous Mesoamerican people with the European, African, and Asian people who were introduced by the Spanish colonization. Mesoamerica is one of the six areas in the world where ancient civilizations arose independently (see cradle of civilization), and the second in the Americas, alongside the Caral–Supe in modern-day Peru. Mesoamerica is also one of only five regions of the world where writing is known to have independently developed (the others being ancient Egypt, India, Sumer, and China).

Beginning as early as 7000 BCE, the domestication of cacao, maize, beans, tomato, avocado, vanilla, squash and chili, as well as the turkey and dog, resulted in a transition from paleo-Indian hunter-gatherer tribal groupings to the organization of sedentary agricultural villages. In the subsequent formative period, agriculture and cultural traits such as a complex mythological and religious tradition, a vigesimal numeric system, a complex calendric system, a tradition of ball playing, and a distinct architectural style, were diffused through the area. Villages began to become socially stratified and develop into chiefdoms, and large ceremonial centers were built, interconnected by a network of trade routes for the exchange of luxury goods, such as obsidian, jade, cacao, cinnabar, Spondylus shells, hematite, and ceramics. While Mesoamerican civilization knew of the wheel and basic metallurgy, neither of these became technologically relevant.

Among the earliest complex civilizations was the Olmec culture, which inhabited the Gulf Coast of Mexico and extended inland and southwards across the Isthmus of Tehuantepec. Frequent contact and cultural interchange between the early Olmec and other cultures in Chiapas, Oaxaca, and Guatemala laid the basis for the Mesoamerican culture. This was facilitated by considerable regional communications in ancient Mesoamerica, especially along the Pacific coast.

In the subsequent preclassic period, complex urban polities began to develop among the Maya, with the rise of centers such as Aguada Fénix and Calakmul in Mexico; El Mirador, and Tikal in Guatemala, and the Zapotec at Monte Albán. During this period, the first true Mesoamerican writing systems were developed in the Epi-Olmec and the Zapotec cultures. The Mesoamerican writing tradition reached its height in the Classic Maya logosyllabic script.

In Central Mexico, the city of Teotihuacan ascended at the height of the Classic period; it formed a military and commercial empire whose political influence stretched south into the Maya area and northward. Upon the collapse of Teotihuacán around 600 CE, competition between several important political centers in central Mexico, such as Xochicalco and Cholula, ensued. At this time during the Epi-Classic period, the Nahua people began moving south into Mesoamerica from the North, and became politically and culturally dominant in central Mexico, as they displaced speakers of Oto-Manguean languages.

During the early post-Classic period, central Mexico was dominated by the Toltec culture, and Oaxaca by the Mixtec. The lowland Maya area had important centers at Chichén Itzá and Mayapán. Towards the end of the post-Classic period, the Aztecs of central Mexico built a tributary empire covering most of central Mesoamerica.

The distinct Mesoamerican cultural tradition ended with the Spanish conquest in the 16th century. Eurasian diseases such as smallpox and measles, which were endemic among the colonists but new to North America, caused the deaths of upwards of 90% of the indigenous people, resulting in great losses to their societies and cultures. Over the next centuries, Mesoamerican indigenous cultures were gradually subjected to Spanish colonial rule. Aspects of the Mesoamerican cultural heritage still survive among the indigenous people who inhabit Mesoamerica. Many continue to speak their ancestral languages and maintain practices hearkening back to their Mesoamerican roots.

== Etymology and definition ==
Ancient Mesoamerican sites in El Salvador

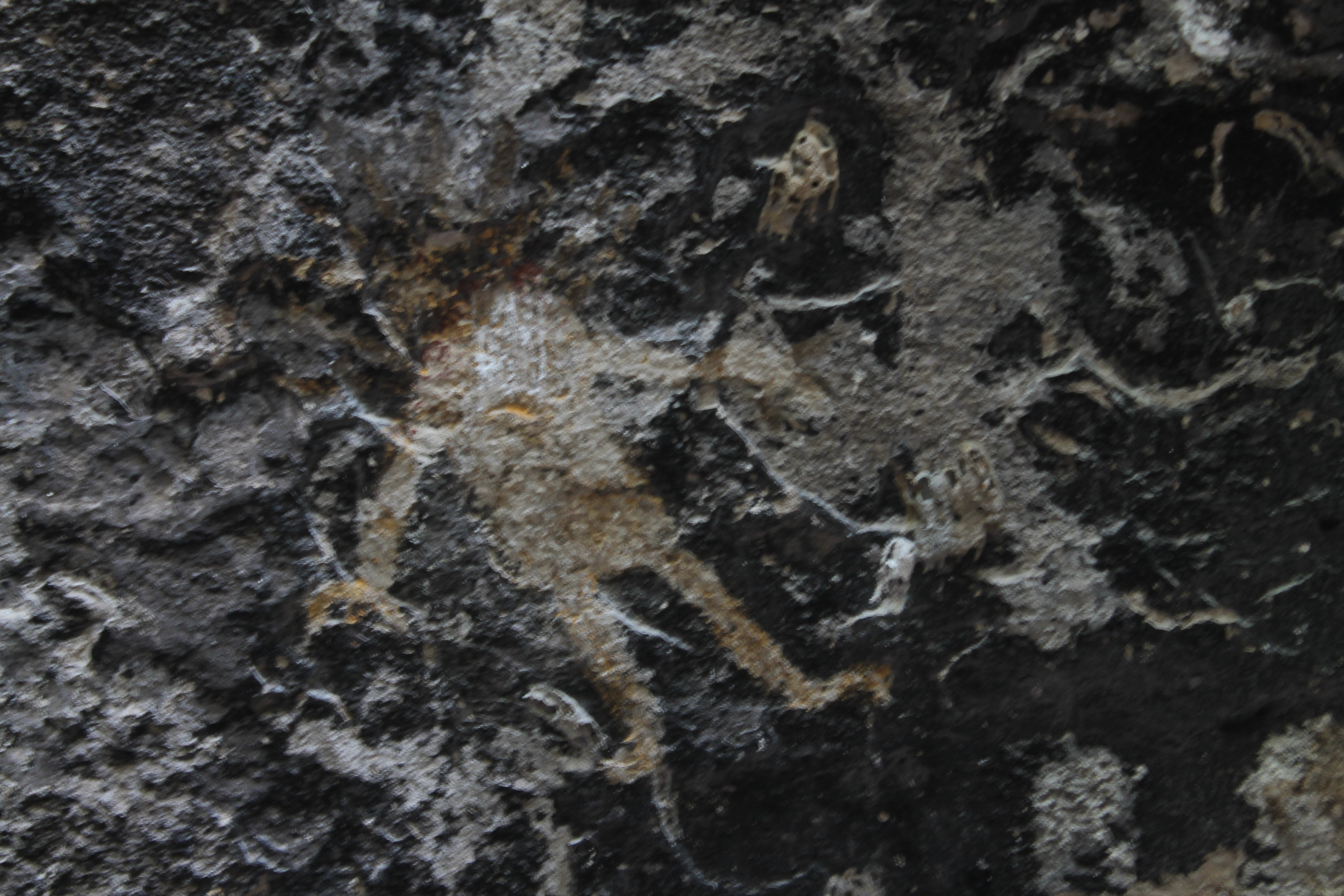
Holy Spirit Grotto

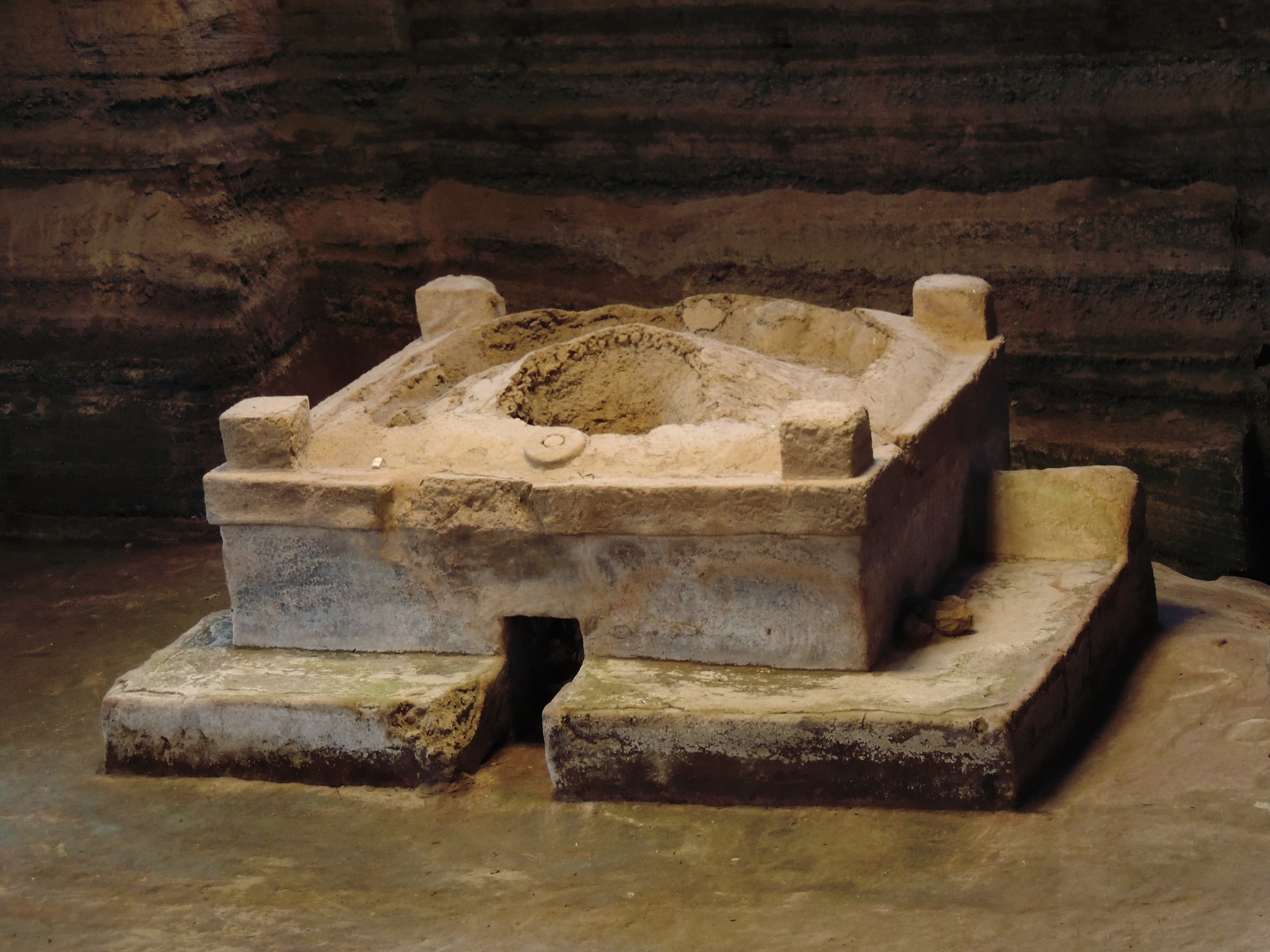
Joya de Cerén

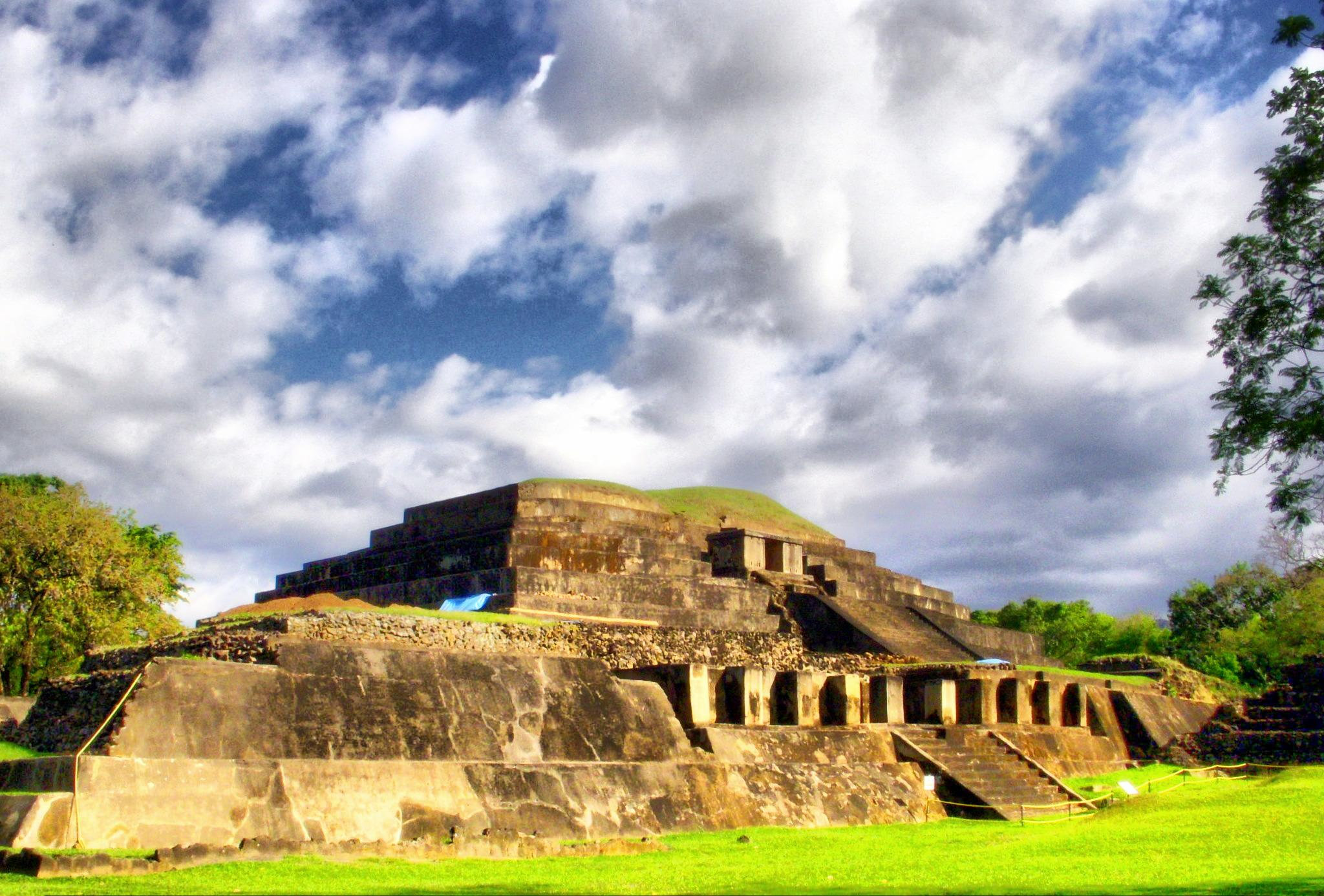
Tazumal

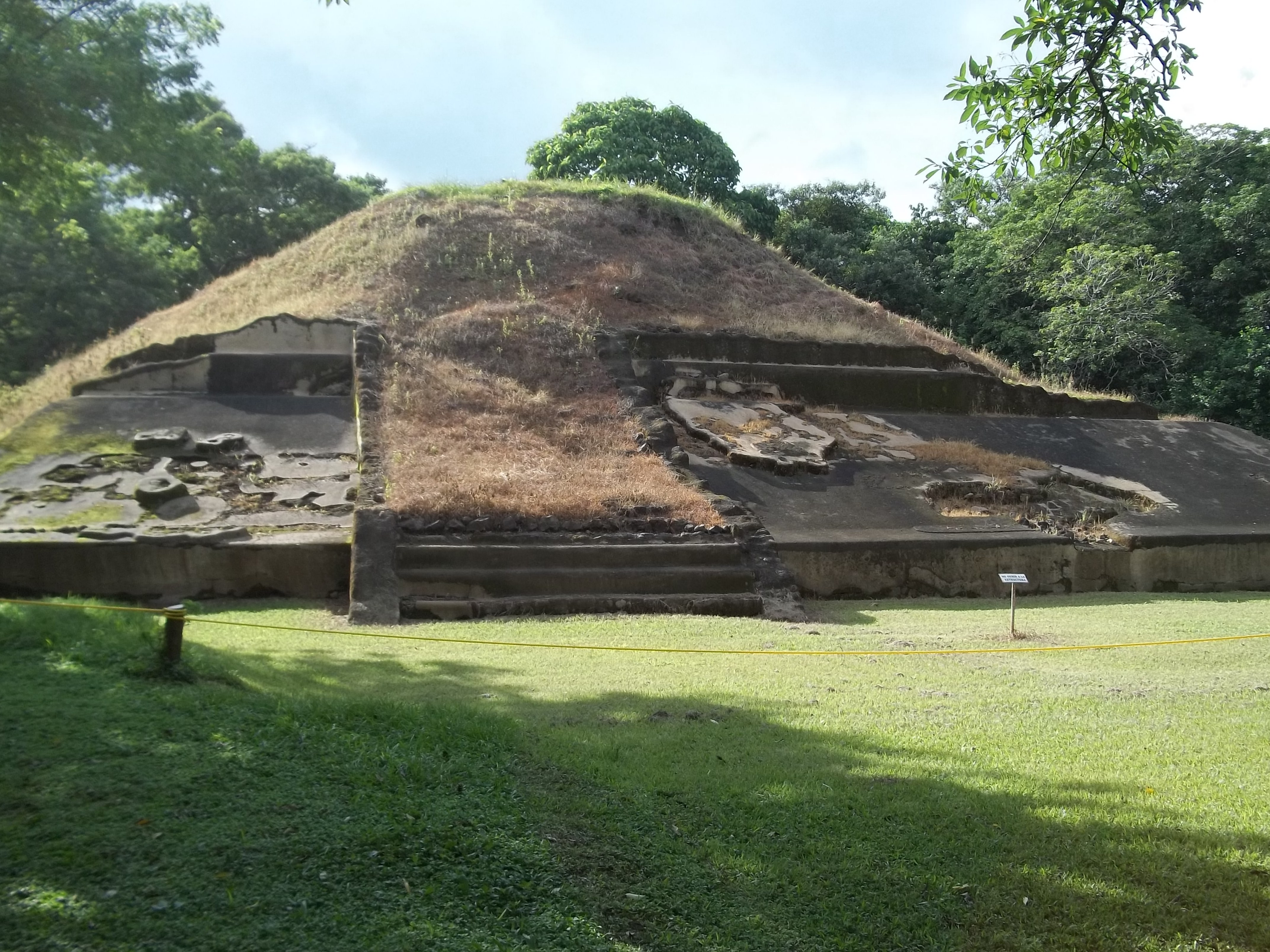
Casa Blanca

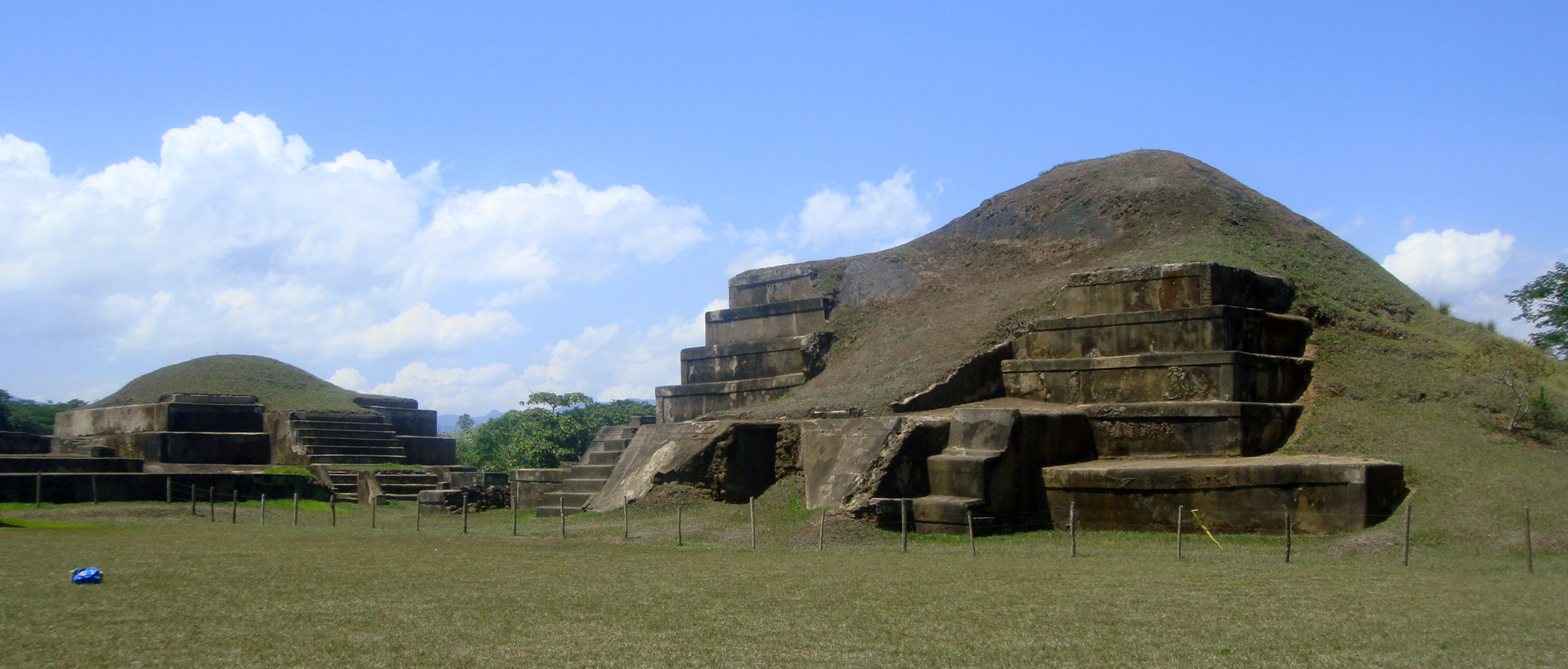
San Andres

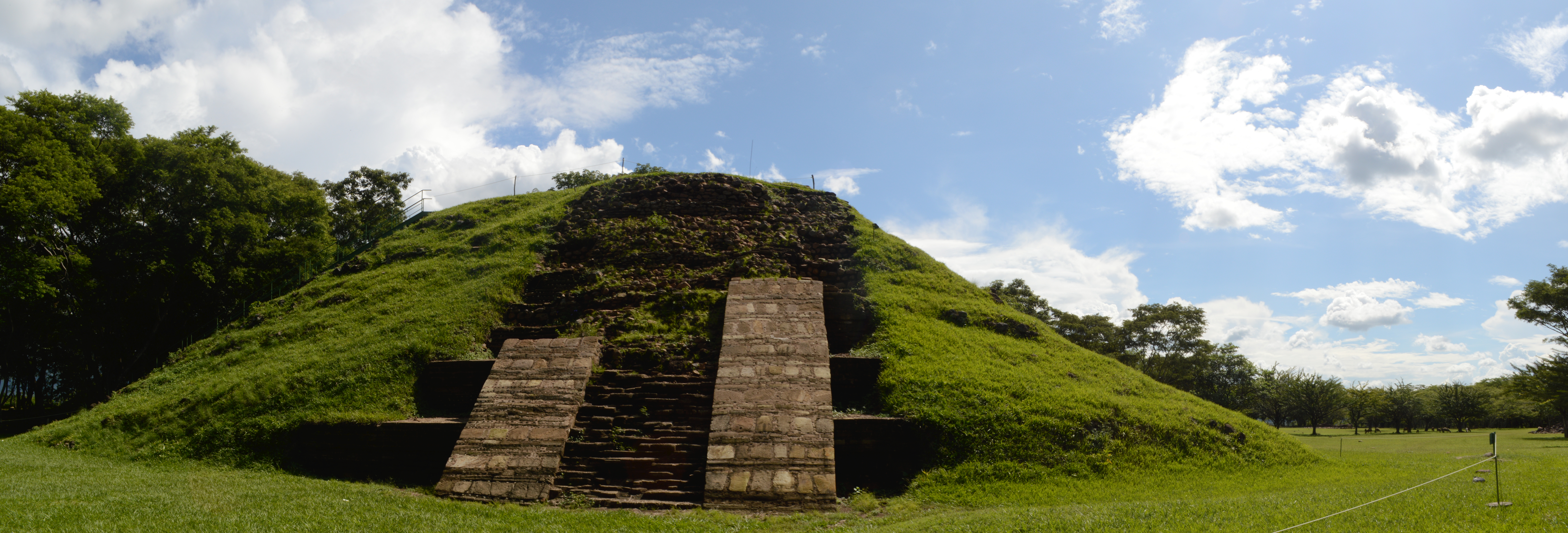
Cihuatán

The term Mesoamerica means "middle America" in Greek. Middle America often refers to a larger area in the Americas, but it has also previously been used more narrowly to refer to Mesoamerica. An example is the title of the 16 volumes of The Handbook of Middle American Indians. "Mesoamerica" is broadly defined as the area that is home to the Mesoamerican civilization, which comprises a group of peoples with close cultural and historical ties. The exact geographic extent of Mesoamerica has varied through time, as the civilization extended North and South from its heartland in southern Mexico.

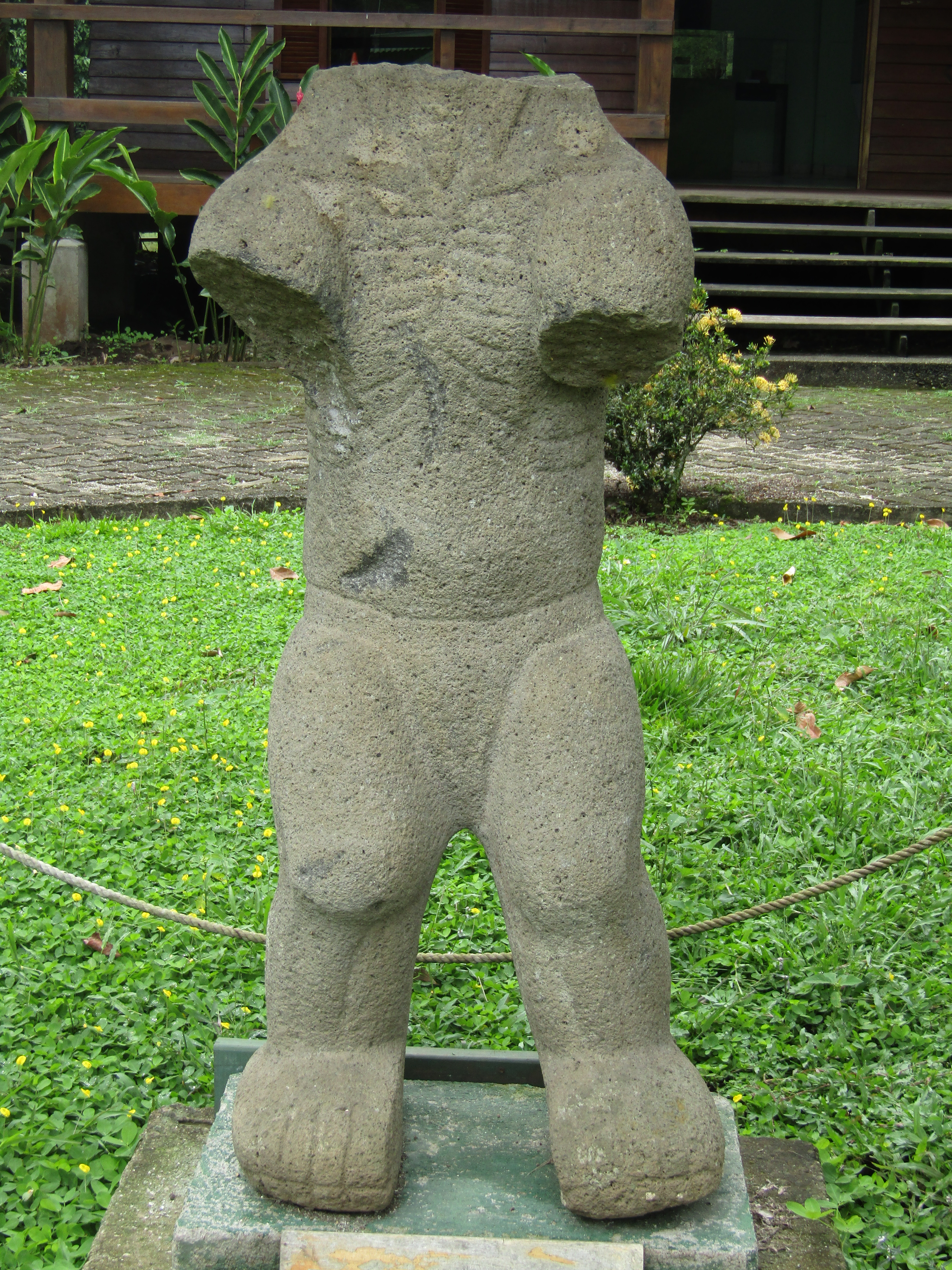
Anthropomorphic figure from the Proto-Lencan culture found at Los Naranjos, Honduras. An example of Mesomerican art during the preclassic Period.

The term was first used by the German ethnologist Paul Kirchhoff, who noted that similarities existed among the various pre-Columbian cultures within the region that included southern Mexico, Guatemala, Belize, El Salvador, western Honduras, and the Pacific lowlands of Nicaragua and northwestern Costa Rica. In the tradition of cultural history, the prevalent archaeological theory of the early to middle 20th century, Kirchhoff defined this zone as a cultural area based on a suite of interrelated cultural similarities brought about by millennia of inter- and intra-regional interaction (i.e., diffusion). Mesoamerica is recognized as a near-prototypical cultural area. This term is now fully integrated into the standard terminology of precolumbian anthropological studies. Conversely, the sister terms Aridoamerica and Oasisamerica, which refer to northern Mexico and the western United States, respectively, have not entered into widespread usage.

Some of the significant cultural traits defining the Mesoamerican cultural tradition are:

- Horticulture and plant use: sedentism based on maize agriculture; floating gardens; use of bark paper and agave (see also maguey) for ritual purposes, as a medium for writing, and the use of agave for cooking and clothing; cultivation of cacao; grinding of maize softened with ashes or lime; harpoon-shaped digging stick
- Clothing and personal articles: lip plugs, mirrors of polished stone, turbans, sandals with heels, textiles adorned with rabbit hair
- Architecture: construction of stepped pyramids; stucco floors; ball courts with stone rings (see the use of natural rubber and the practice of the ritual Mesoamerican ballgame)
- Record keeping: use of two different calendars (a 260-day ritual calendar and a 365-day calendar based on the solar year); use of locally developed pictographic and hieroglyphic (logo-syllabic) writing systems; numbers (see also vigesimal (base 20) number system); "century" of fifty-two years; eighteen-month calendar; screen-fold books
- Commerce: specialized markets, "department store" markets subdivided according to specialty
- Weapons and warfare: wooden swords with stone chips set into the edges (see macuahuitl), military orders (eagle knights and jaguar knights), clay pellets for blowguns, cotton-pad armor, traveling merchants who act as spies, wars for the purpose of securing sacrificial victims
- Ritual and myth: the practice of various forms of ritual sacrifice, including human sacrifice and quail sacrifice; paper and rubber as sacrificial offerings; a pantheon of gods or spirits; acrobatic flier dance (see the Danza de los Voladores and the Totonac flier dance); 13 as a ritual number; ritual period of 20 x 13 = 260 days; the mythic concept of one or more afterworlds and the difficult journey in reaching them; good and bad omen days; a religious complex based on a combination of shamanism and natural deities, and a shared system of symbols
- Language: a linguistic area defined by a number of grammatical traits that have spread through the area by diffusion

== Geography ==
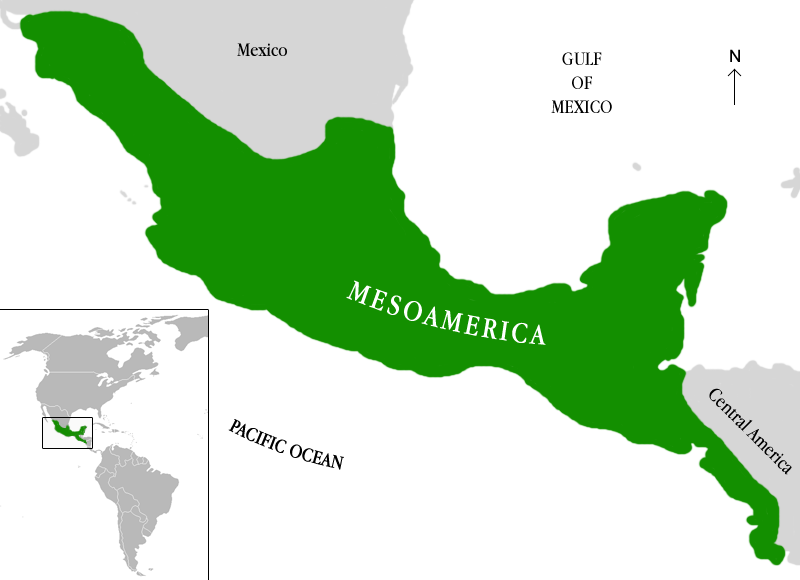
Mesoamerica is primarily situated in western and southern Mexico and Guatemala, above it is Aridoamerica and below is the Isthmo-Colombian Area

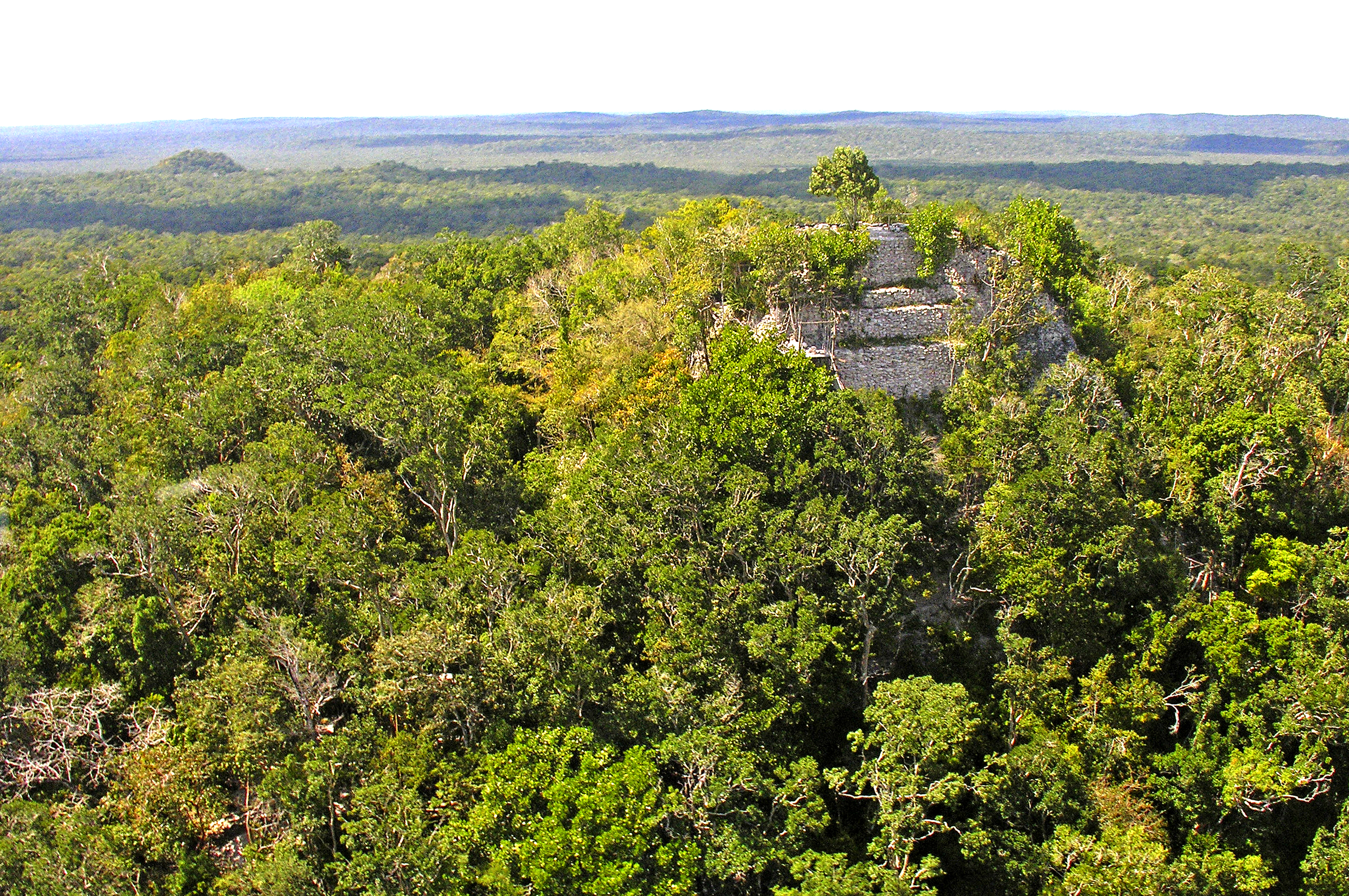
El Mirador flourished from 600 BCE to 100 CE, and may have had a population of over 100,000.

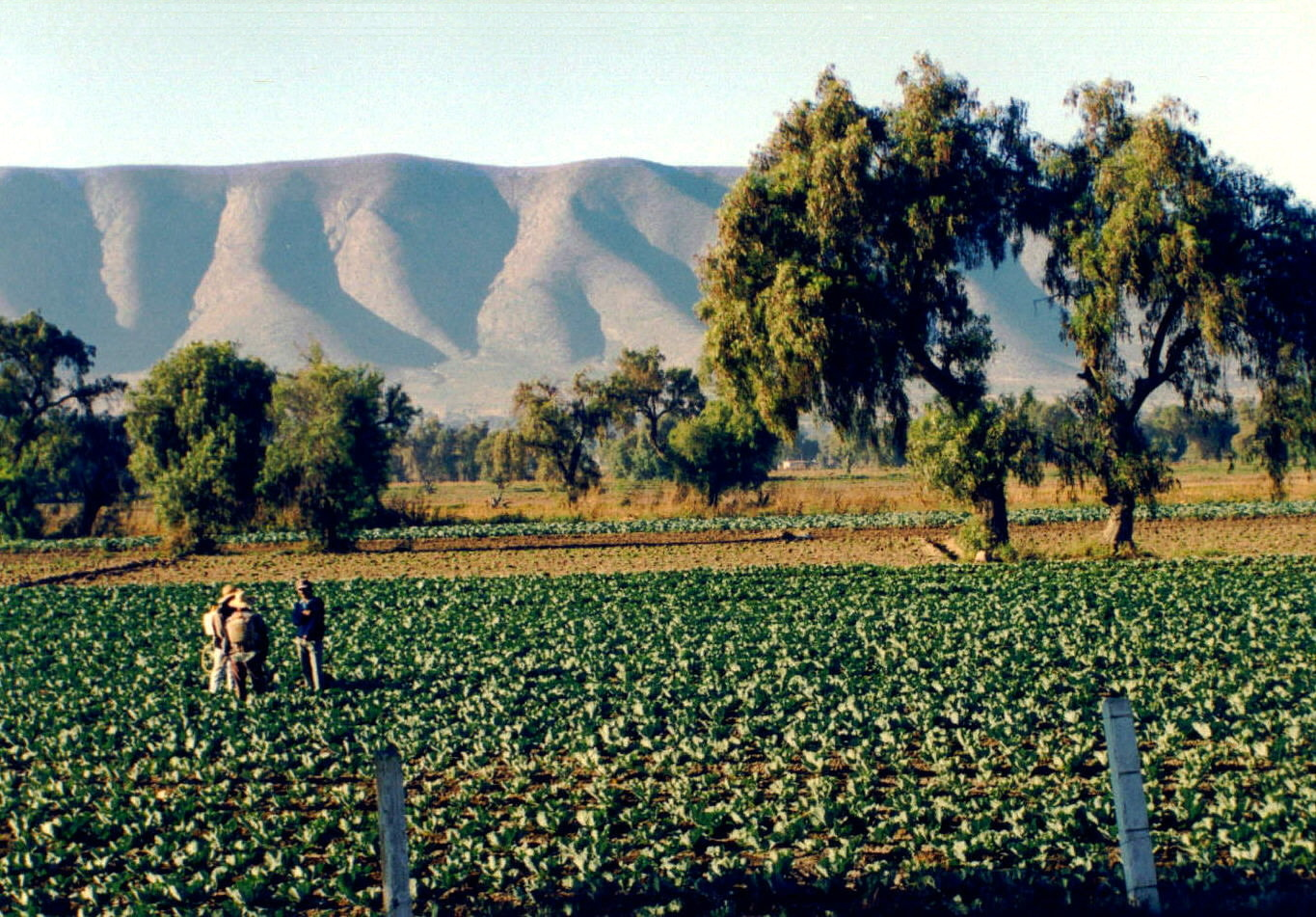
Landscape of the Mesoamerican highlands.

Located on the Middle American isthmus joining North and South America between ca. 10° and 22° northern latitude, Mesoamerica possesses a complex combination of ecological systems, topographic zones, and environmental contexts. These different niches are classified into two broad categories: the lowlands (those areas between sea level and 1000 meters) and the altiplanos, or highlands (situated between 1,000 and 2,000 meters above sea level). In the low-lying regions, sub-tropical and tropical climates are most common, as is true for most of the coastline along the Pacific and Gulf of Mexico and the Caribbean Sea. The highlands show much more climatic diversity, ranging from dry tropical to cold mountainous climates; the dominant climate is temperate with warm temperatures and moderate rainfall. The rainfall varies from the dry Oaxaca and north Yucatán to the humid southern Pacific and Caribbean lowlands.

=== Cultural sub-areas ===
Several distinct sub-regions within Mesoamerica are defined by a convergence of geographic and cultural attributes. These sub-regions are more conceptual than culturally meaningful, and the demarcation of their limits is not rigid. The Maya area, for example, can be divided into two general groups: the lowlands and highlands. The lowlands are further divided into the southern and northern Maya lowlands. The southern Maya lowlands are generally regarded as encompassing northern Guatemala, southern Campeche and Quintana Roo in Mexico, and Belize. The northern lowlands cover the remainder of the northern portion of the Yucatán Peninsula. Other areas include Central Mexico, West Mexico, the Gulf Coast Lowlands, Oaxaca, the Southern Pacific Lowlands, and Southeast Mesoamerica (including northern Honduras).

=== Topography ===
There is extensive topographic variation in Mesoamerica, ranging from the high peaks circumscribing the Valley of Mexico and within the central Sierra Madre mountains to the low flatlands of the northern Yucatán Peninsula. The tallest mountain in Mesoamerica is Pico de Orizaba, a dormant volcano located on the border of Puebla and Veracruz. Its peak elevation is 5,636 m (18,490 ft).

The Sierra Madre mountains, which consist of several smaller ranges, run from northern Mesoamerica south through Costa Rica. The chain is historically volcanic. In central and southern Mexico, a portion of the Sierra Madre chain is known as the Eje Volcánico Transversal, or the Trans-Mexican volcanic belt. There are 83 inactive and active volcanoes within the Sierra Madre range, including 11 in Mexico, 37 in Guatemala, 23 in El Salvador, 25 in Nicaragua, and 3 in northwestern Costa Rica. According to the Michigan Technological University, 16 of these are still active. The tallest active volcano is Popocatépetl at 5,452 m (17,887 ft). This volcano, which retains its Nahuatl name, is located 70 km (43 mi) southeast of Mexico City. Other volcanoes of note include Tacana on the Mexico–Guatemala border, Tajumulco and Santamaría in Guatemala, Izalco in El Salvador, Arenal in Costa Rica, Cerro Negro, along with Concepción and Maderas on Ometepe, which is an island formed by both volcanoes rising out of Lake Cocibolca in Nicaragua.

One important topographic feature is the Isthmus of Tehuantepec, a low plateau that breaks up the Sierra Madre chain between the Sierra Madre del Sur to the north and the Sierra Madre de Chiapas to the south. At its highest point, the Isthmus is 224 m (735 ft) above mean sea level. This area also represents the shortest distance between the Gulf of Mexico and the Pacific Ocean in Mexico. The distance between the two coasts is roughly 200 km (120 mi). The northern side of the Isthmus is swampy and covered in dense jungle—but the Isthmus of Tehuantepec, as the lowest and most level point within the Sierra Madre mountain chain, was nonetheless a main transportation, communication, and economic route within Mesoamerica.

=== Bodies of water ===
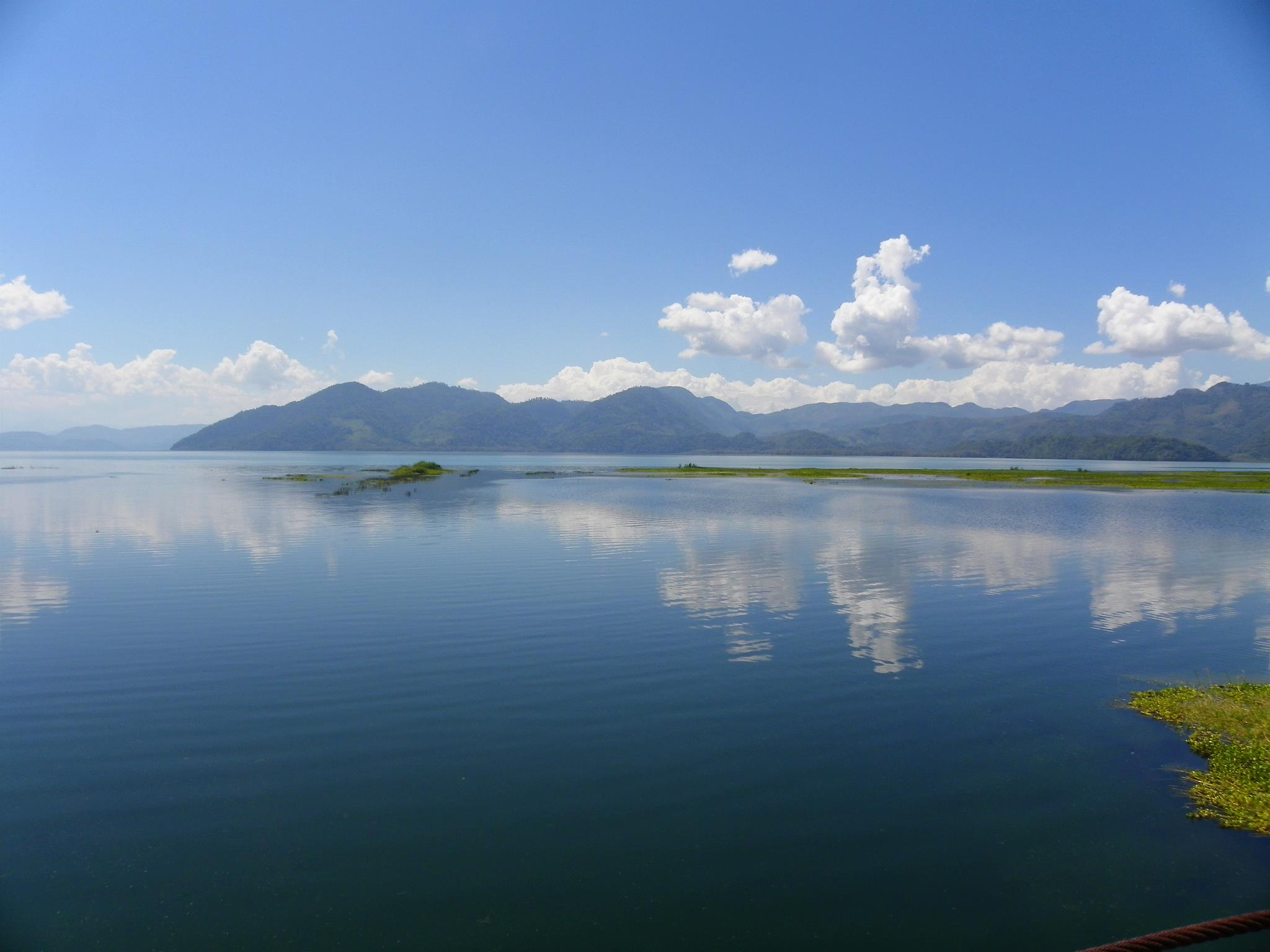
Yojoa Lake in Honduras.

Outside of the northern Maya lowlands, rivers are common throughout Mesoamerica. Some of the more important ones served as loci of human occupation in the area. The longest river in Mesoamerica is the Usumacinta, which forms in Guatemala at the convergence of the Salinas or Chixoy and La Pasión River and runs north for 970 km (600 mi)—480 km (300 mi) of which are navigable—eventually draining into the Gulf of Mexico. Other rivers of note include the Río Grande de Santiago, the Grijalva River, the Motagua River, the Ulúa River, and the Hondo River. The northern Maya lowlands, especially the northern portion of the Yucatán peninsula, are notable for their nearly complete lack of rivers (largely due to the absolute lack of topographic variation). Additionally, no lakes exist in the northern peninsula. The main source of water in this area is aquifers that are accessed through natural surface openings called cenotes.

With an area of 8,264 km^{2} (3,191 sq mi), Lake Cocibolca in Nicaragua is the largest lake in Mesoamerica, and second largest in all Latin America. Lake Chapala is Mexico's largest freshwater lake, but Lake Texcoco is perhaps most well known as the location upon which Tenochtitlan, capital of the Aztec Empire, was founded. Lake Petén Itzá, in northern Guatemala, is notable as where the last independent Maya city, Tayasal (or Noh Petén), held out against the Spanish until 1697. Other large lakes include Lake Atitlán, Lake Izabal, Lake Güija, Lemoa and Lake Xolotlan.

=== Biodiversity ===
Almost all ecosystems are present in Mesoamerica; the more well known are the Mesoamerican Barrier Reef System, the second largest in the world, and La Mosquitia (consisting of the Río Plátano Biosphere Reserve, Tawahka Asangni, Patuca National Park, and Bosawás Biosphere Reserve) a rainforest second in size in the Americas only to the Amazonas. The highlands present mixed and coniferous forest. The biodiversity is among the richest in the world, though the number of species in the red list of the IUCN grows every year.

== Chronology, culture and history ==
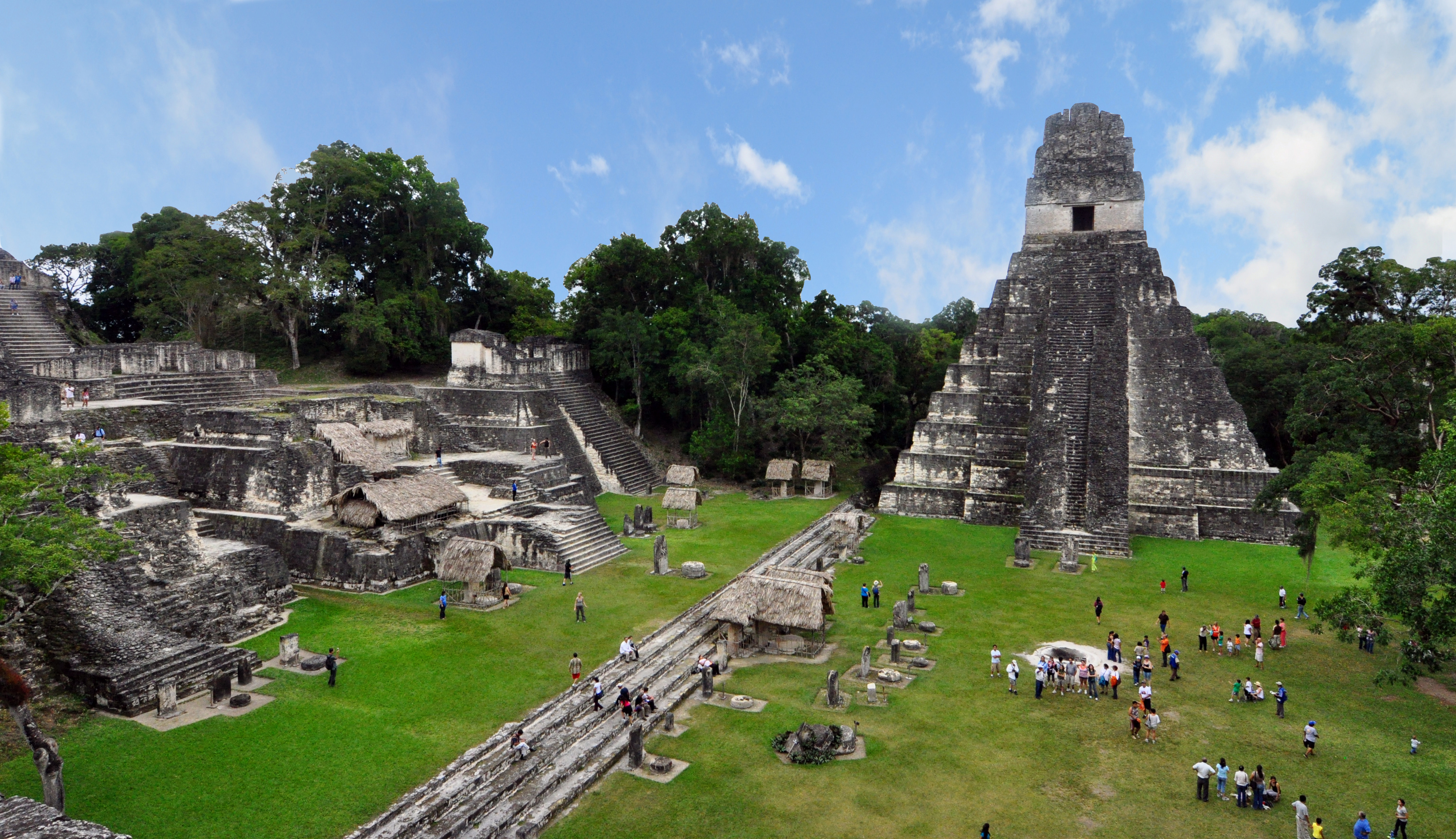
Tikal is one of the largest archaeological sites, urban centers, and tourist attractions of the pre-Columbian Maya civilization. It is located in the archaeological region of the Petén Basin in what is now northern Guatemala.

The history of human occupation in Mesoamerica is divided into stages or periods. These are known, with slight variation depending on region, as the Paleo-Indian, the Archaic, the Preclassic (or Formative), the Classic, and the Postclassic. The last three periods, representing the core of Mesoamerican cultural fluorescence, are further divided into two or three sub-phases. Most of the time following the arrival of the Spanish in the 16th century is classified as the Colonial period.

The differentiation of early periods (i.e., up through the end of the Late Preclassic) generally reflects different configurations of socio-cultural organization that are characterized by increasing socio-political complexity, the adoption of new and different subsistence strategies, and changes in economic organization (including increased interregional interaction). The Classic period through the Postclassic are differentiated by the cyclical crystallization and fragmentation of the various political entities throughout Mesoamerica.

=== Paleo-Indian ===
The Mesoamerican Paleo-Indian period precedes the advent of agriculture and is characterized by a nomadic hunting and gathering subsistence strategy. Big-game hunting, similar to that seen in contemporaneous North America, was a large component of the subsistence strategy of the Mesoamerican Paleo-Indian. These sites had obsidian blades and Clovis-style fluted projectile points.

=== Archaic ===
The Archaic period (8000–2000 BCE) is characterized by the rise of incipient agriculture in Mesoamerica. The initial phases of the Archaic involved the cultivation of wild plants, transitioning into informal domestication and culminating with sedentism and agricultural production by the close of the period. Transformations of natural environments have been a common feature at least since the mid Holocene. Archaic sites include Sipacate in Escuintla, Guatemala, where maize pollen samples date to c. 3500 BCE.

=== Preclassic/Formative ===
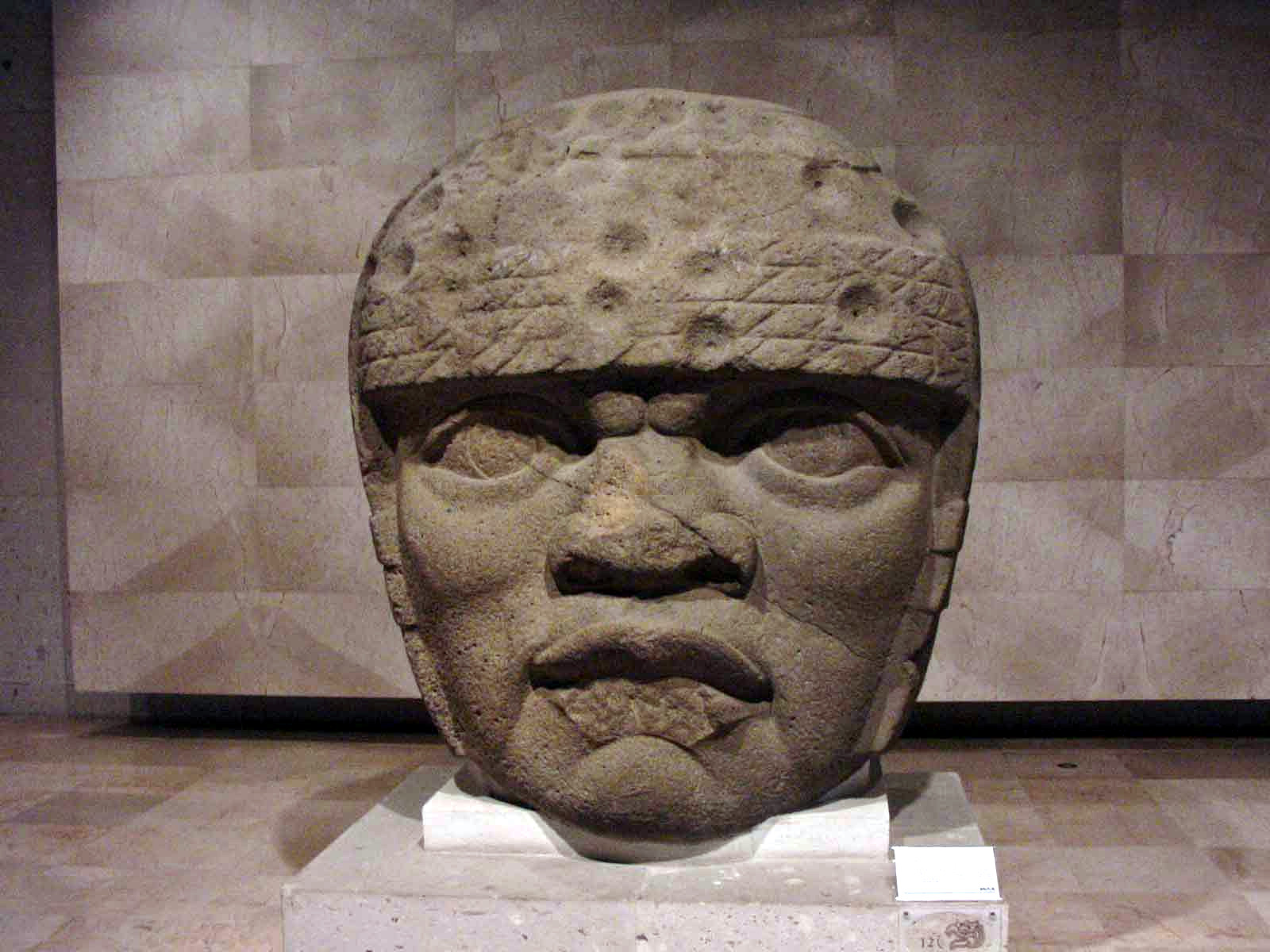
Olmec Colossal Head No. 3 1200–900 BCE

The first complex civilization to develop in Mesoamerica was that of the Olmec, who inhabited the Gulf Coast region of Veracruz throughout the Preclassic period. The main sites of the Olmec include San Lorenzo Tenochtitlán, La Venta, and Tres Zapotes. Specific dates vary, but these sites were occupied from roughly 1200 to 400 BCE. Remains of other early cultures interacting with the Olmec have been found at Takalik Abaj, Izapa, and Teopantecuanitlan, and as far south as in Honduras. Research in the Pacific Lowlands of Chiapas and Guatemala suggest that Izapa and the Monte Alto Culture may have preceded the Olmec. Radiocarbon samples associated with various sculptures found at the Late Preclassic site of Izapa suggest a date of between 1800 and 1500 BCE.

During the Middle and Late Preclassic period, the Maya civilization developed in the southern Maya highlands and lowlands, and at a few sites in the northern Maya lowlands. The earliest Maya sites coalesced after 1000 BCE, and include Nakbe, El Mirador, and Cerros. Middle to Late Preclassic Maya sites include Kaminaljuyú, Cival, Edzná, Cobá, Lamanai, Komchen, Dzibilchaltun, and San Bartolo, among others.

The Preclassic in the central Mexican highlands is represented by such sites as Tlapacoya, Tlatilco, and Cuicuilco. These sites were eventually superseded by Teotihuacán, an important Classic-era site that eventually dominated economic and interaction spheres throughout Mesoamerica. The settlement of Teotihuacan is dated to the later portion of the Late Preclassic, or roughly 50 CE.

In the Valley of Oaxaca, San José Mogote represents one of the oldest permanent agricultural villages in the area, and one of the first to use pottery. During the Early and Middle Preclassic, the site developed some of the earliest examples of defensive palisades, ceremonial structures, the use of adobe, and hieroglyphic writing. Also of importance, the site was one of the first to demonstrate inherited status, signifying a radical shift in socio-cultural and political structure. San José Mogote was eventually overtaken by Monte Albán, the subsequent capital of the Zapotec empire, during the Late Preclassic.

The Preclassic in western Mexico, in the states of Nayarit, Jalisco, Colima, and Michoacán also known as the Occidente, is poorly understood. This period is best represented by the thousands of figurines recovered by looters and ascribed to the "shaft tomb tradition".

=== Classic ===
==== Early Classic ====
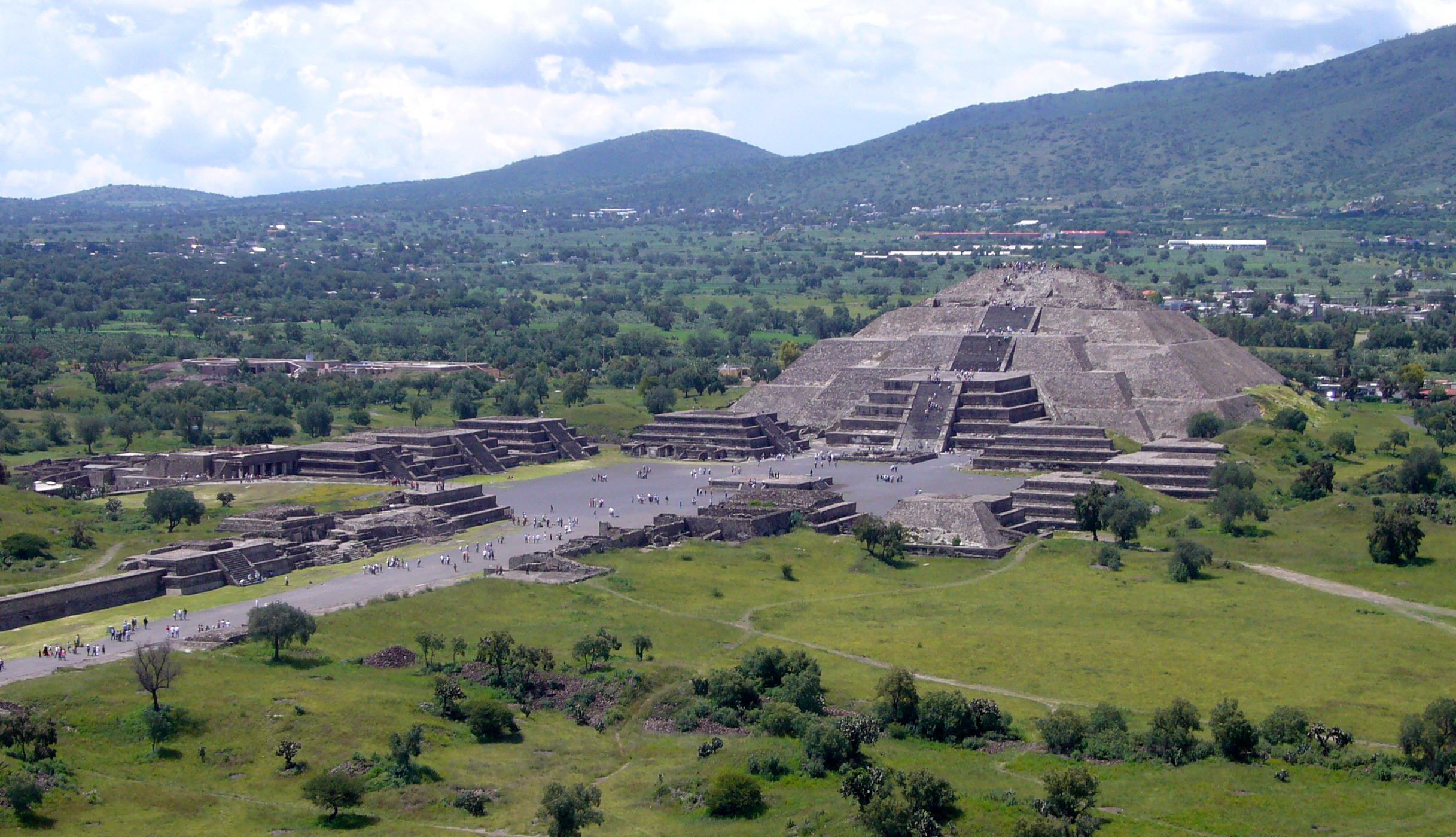
Pyramid of the Moon viewed from atop of the Pyramid of the Sun.

The Classic period is marked by the rise and dominance of several polities. The traditional distinction between the Early and Late Classic is marked by their changing fortune and their ability to maintain regional primacy. Of paramount importance are Teotihuacán in central Mexico and Tikal in Guatemala; the Early Classic's temporal limits generally correlate to the main periods of these sites. Monte Albán in Oaxaca is another Classic-period polity that expanded and flourished during this period, but the Zapotec capital exerted less interregional influence than the other two sites.

During the Early Classic, Teotihuacan participated in and perhaps dominated a far-reaching macro-regional interaction network. Architectural and artifact styles (talud-tablero, tripod slab-footed ceramic vessels) epitomized at Teotihuacan were mimicked and adopted at many distant settlements. Pachuca obsidian, whose trade and distribution is argued to have been economically controlled by Teotihuacan, is found throughout Mesoamerica.

Tikal came to dominate much of the southern Maya lowlands politically, economically, and militarily during the Early Classic. An exchange network centered at Tikal distributed a variety of goods and commodities throughout southeast Mesoamerica, such as obsidian imported from central Mexico (e.g., Pachuca) and highland Guatemala (e.g., El Chayal, which was predominantly used by the Maya during the Early Classic), and jade from the Motagua valley in Guatemala. Tikal was often in conflict with other polities in the Petén Basin, as well as with others outside of it, including Uaxactun, Caracol, Dos Pilas, Naranjo, and Calakmul. Towards the end of the Early Classic, this conflict lead to Tikal's military defeat at the hands of Caracol in 562, and a period commonly known as the Tikal Hiatus.

==== Late Classic ====
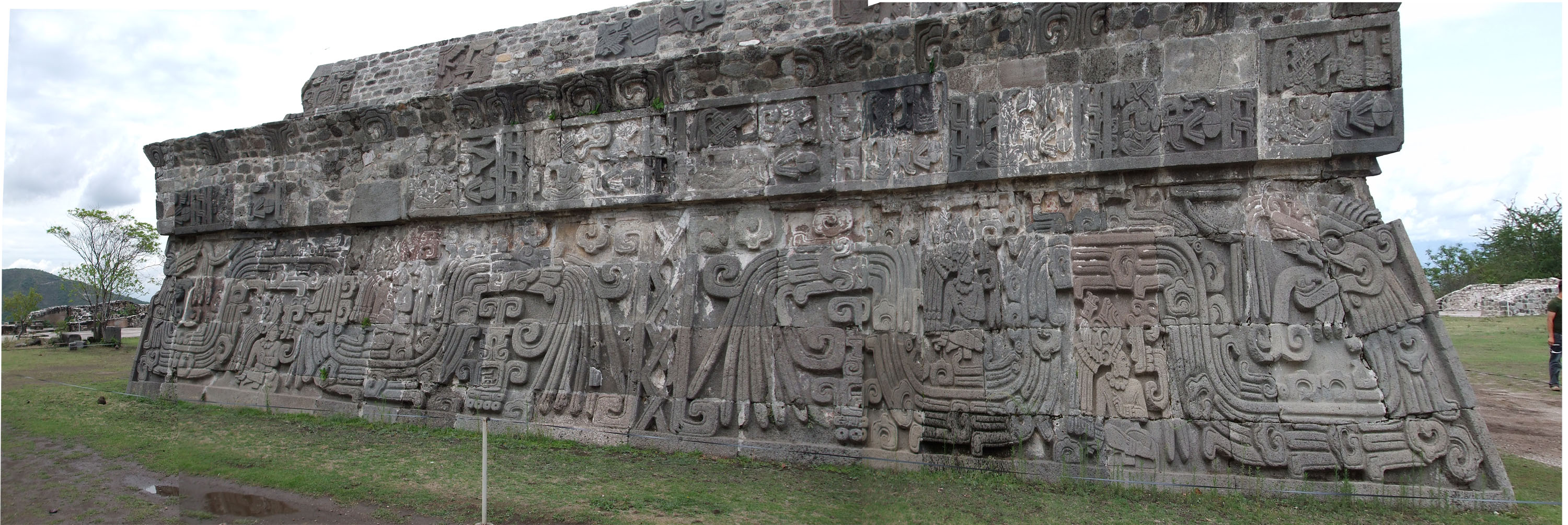
Xochicalco, Temple of the Feathered Serpent, 650–900 CE

The Late Classic period (beginning c. 600 CE until 909 CE) is characterized as a period of interregional competition and factionalization among the numerous regional polities in the Maya area. This largely resulted from the decrease in Tikal's socio-political and economic power at the beginning of the period. It was therefore during this time that other sites rose to regional prominence and were able to exert greater interregional influence, including Caracol, Copán, Palenque, and Calakmul (which was allied with Caracol and may have assisted in the defeat of Tikal), and Dos Pilas Aguateca and Cancuén in the Petexbatún region of Guatemala. Around 710, Tikal arose again and started to build strong alliances and defeat its worst enemies. In the Maya area, the Late Classic ended with the so-called "Maya collapse", a transitional period coupling the general depopulation of the southern lowlands and development and florescence of centers in the northern lowlands.

==== Terminal Classic ====
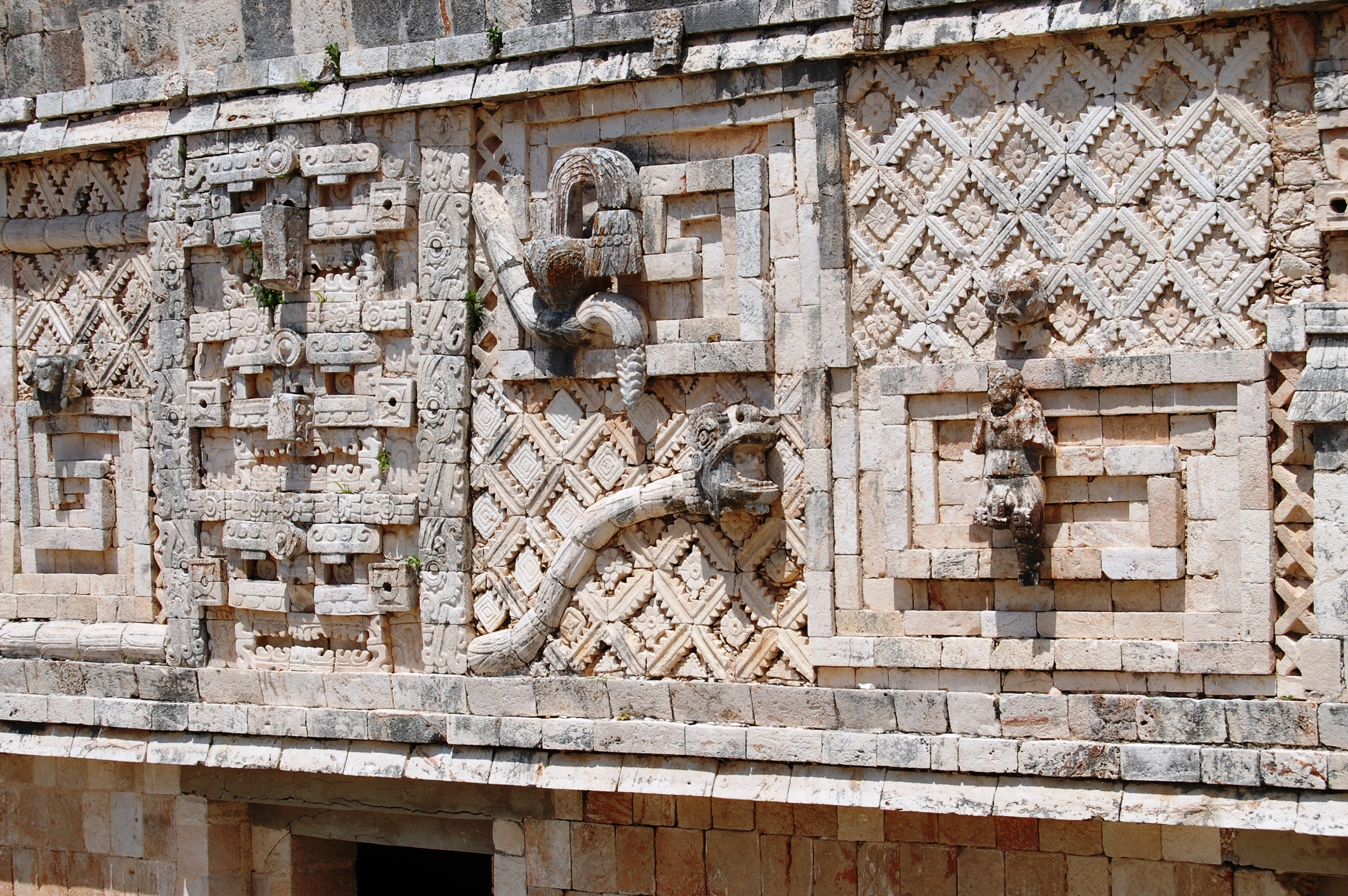
Detail of the Nunnery Quadrangle at Uxmal, 10th century

Generally applied to the Maya area, the Terminal Classic roughly spans the time between c. 800/850 and c. 1000 CE. Overall, it generally correlates with the rise to prominence of Puuc settlements in the northern Maya lowlands, so named after the hills where they are mainly found. Puuc settlements are specifically associated with a unique architectural style (the "Puuc architectural style") that represents a technological departure from previous construction techniques. Major Puuc sites include Uxmal, Sayil, Labna, Kabah, and Oxkintok. While generally concentrated within the area in and around the Puuc hills, the style has been documented as far away as at Chichen Itza to the east and Edzna to the south.

Chichén Itzá was originally thought to have been a Postclassic site in the northern Maya lowlands. Research over the past few decades has established that it was first settled during the Early/Late Classic transition but rose to prominence during the Terminal Classic and Early Postclassic. During its apogee, this widely known site economically and politically dominated the northern lowlands. Its participation in the circum-peninsular exchange route, possible through its port site of Isla Cerritos, allowed Chichén Itzá to remain highly connected to areas such as central Mexico and Central America. The apparent "Mexicanization" of architecture at Chichén Itzá led past researchers to believe that Chichén Itzá existed under the control of a Toltec empire. Chronological data refutes this early interpretation, and it is now known that Chichén Itzá predated the Toltec; Mexican architectural styles are now used as an indicator of strong economic and ideological ties between the two regions.

=== Postclassic ===
The Postclassic (beginning 900–1000 CE, depending on area) is, like the Late Classic, characterized by the cyclical crystallization and fragmentation of various polities. The main Maya centers were located in the northern lowlands. Following Chichén Itzá, whose political structure collapsed during the Early Postclassic, Mayapán rose to prominence during the Middle Postclassic and dominated the north for c. 200 years. After Mayapán's fragmentation, the political structure in the northern lowlands revolved around large towns or city-states, such as Oxkutzcab and Ti'ho (Mérida, Yucatán), that competed with one another.

The Aztec Empire in 1512

Mesoamerica and Central America in the 16th century before Spanish arrival

Toniná, in the Chiapas highlands, and Kaminaljuyú in the central Guatemala highlands, were important southern highland Maya centers. The latter site, Kaminaljuyú, is one of the longest occupied sites in Mesoamerica and was continuously inhabited from c. 800 BCE to around 1200 CE. Other important highland Maya groups include the Kʼicheʼ of Utatlán, the Mam in Zaculeu, the Poqomam in Mixco Viejo, and the Kaqchikel at Iximche in the Guatemalan highlands. The Pipil resided in El Salvador, the Nicarao were in western Nicaragua and northwestern Costa Rica, and the Ch'orti' were in eastern Guatemala and northwestern Honduras.

In central Mexico, the early portion of the Postclassic correlates with the rise of the Toltec and an empire based at their capital, Tula (also known as Tollan). Cholula, initially an important Early Classic center contemporaneous with Teotihuacan, maintained its political structure (it did not collapse) and continued to function as a regionally important center during the Postclassic. The latter portion of the Postclassic is generally associated with the rise of the Mexica and the Aztec Empire. One of the more commonly known cultural groups in Mesoamerica, the Aztec politically dominated nearly all of central Mexico, the Gulf Coast, Mexico's southern Pacific Coast (Chiapas and into Guatemala), Oaxaca, and Guerrero.

The Tarascans (also known as the Purépecha) were located in Michoacán and Guerrero. With their capital at Tzintzuntzan, the Tarascan state was one of the few to actively and continuously resist Aztec domination during the Late Postclassic. Other important Postclassic cultures in Mesoamerica include the Totonac along the eastern coast (in the modern-day states of Veracruz, Puebla, and Hidalgo). The Huastec resided north of the Totonac, mainly in the modern-day states of Tamaulipas and northern Veracruz. The Mixtec and Zapotec cultures, centered at Mitla and Zaachila respectively, inhabited Oaxaca.

The Postclassic ends with the arrival of the Spanish and their subsequent conquest of the Aztecs between 1519 and 1521. Many other cultural groups did not acquiesce until later. For example, Maya groups in the Petén area, including the Itza at Tayasal and the Kowoj at Zacpeten, remained independent until 1697.

Some Mesoamerican cultures never achieved dominant status or left impressive archaeological remains but are nevertheless noteworthy. These include the Otomi, Mixe–Zoque groups (which may or may not have been related to the Olmecs), the northern Uto-Aztecan groups, often referred to as the Chichimeca, that include the Cora and Huichol, the Chontales, the Huaves, and the Pipil, Xincan and Lencan peoples of Central America.

=== Chronology in chart form ===
Summary of the chronology and cultures of Mesoamerica
Period	Timespan	Important cultures, cities
Paleo-Indian	10,000–3500 BCE	Honduras, Guatemala, Belize, obsidian and pyrite points, Iztapan
Archaic	3500–1800 BCE	Agricultural settlements, Tehuacán
Preclassic (Formative)	2000 BCE – 250 CE	Unknown culture in La Blanca and Ujuxte, Monte Alto culture
Early Preclassic	2000–1000 BCE	Olmec area: San Lorenzo Tenochtitlan; Central Mexico: Chalcatzingo; Valley of Oaxaca: San José Mogote. The Maya area: Nakbe, Cerros Central American Area: Los Naranjos
Middle Preclassic	1000–400 BCE	Olmec area: La Venta, Tres Zapotes; Maya area: El Mirador, Izapa, Lamanai, Xunantunich, Naj Tunich, Takalik Abaj, Kaminaljuyú, Uaxactun; Valley of Oaxaca: Monte Albán; Central American area: Yarumela
Late Preclassic	400 BCE – 200 CE	Maya area: Uaxactun, Tikal, Edzná, Cival, San Bartolo, Altar de Sacrificios, Piedras Negras, Ceibal, Rio Amarillo, Río Azul; Central Mexico: Teotihuacan; Gulf Coast: Epi-Olmec culture; Western Mexico: Shaft Tomb Tradition
Classic	200–900 CE	Classic Maya Centers, Teotihuacan, Zapotec
Early Classic	200–600 CE	Maya area: Calakmul, Caracol, Chunchucmil, Copán, Naranjo, Palenque, El puente, Quiriguá, Tikal, Uaxactun, Yaxha; Central Mexico: Teotihuacan apogee; Zapotec apogee; Western Mexico: Teuchitlan tradition; Central American area: Tenampua
Late Classic	600–900 CE	Maya area: Uxmal, Toniná, Cobá, Waka', Pusilhá, Xultún, Dos Pilas, Cancuen, Aguateca, Yaxchilan; Central Mexico: Xochicalco, Cacaxtla; Gulf Coast: El Tajín and Classic Veracruz culture; Western Mexico: Teuchitlan tradition
Terminal Classic	800–900/1000 CE	Maya area: Puuc sites: Uxmal, Labna, Sayil, Kabah
Postclassic	900–1519 CE	Aztec, Tarascans, Mixtec, Totonac, Pipil, Nicarao, Itzá, Kowoj, Kʼiche, Kaqchikel, Poqomam, Mam
Early Postclassic	900–1200 CE	Cholula, Tula, Mitla, El Tajín, Tulum, Topoxte, Kaminaljuyú, Joya de Cerén
Late Postclassic	1200–1521 CE	Tenochtitlan, Cempoala, Tzintzuntzan, Mayapán, Ti'ho, Utatlán, Iximche, Mixco Viejo, Zaculeu, Peñol de Cerquin
Colonial	1521–1821	Nahuas, Maya, Mixtec, Zapotec, Purépecha, Chinantec, Otomi, Tepehua, Totonac, Mazatec, Tlapanec, Amuzgo
Postcolonial	1821–present	Nahuas, Maya, Mixtec, Lenca, Zapotec, Purépecha, Chinantec, Otomi, Tepehua, Totonac, Mazatec, Tlapanec, Amuzgo

== Other characteristics ==
=== Subsistence ===
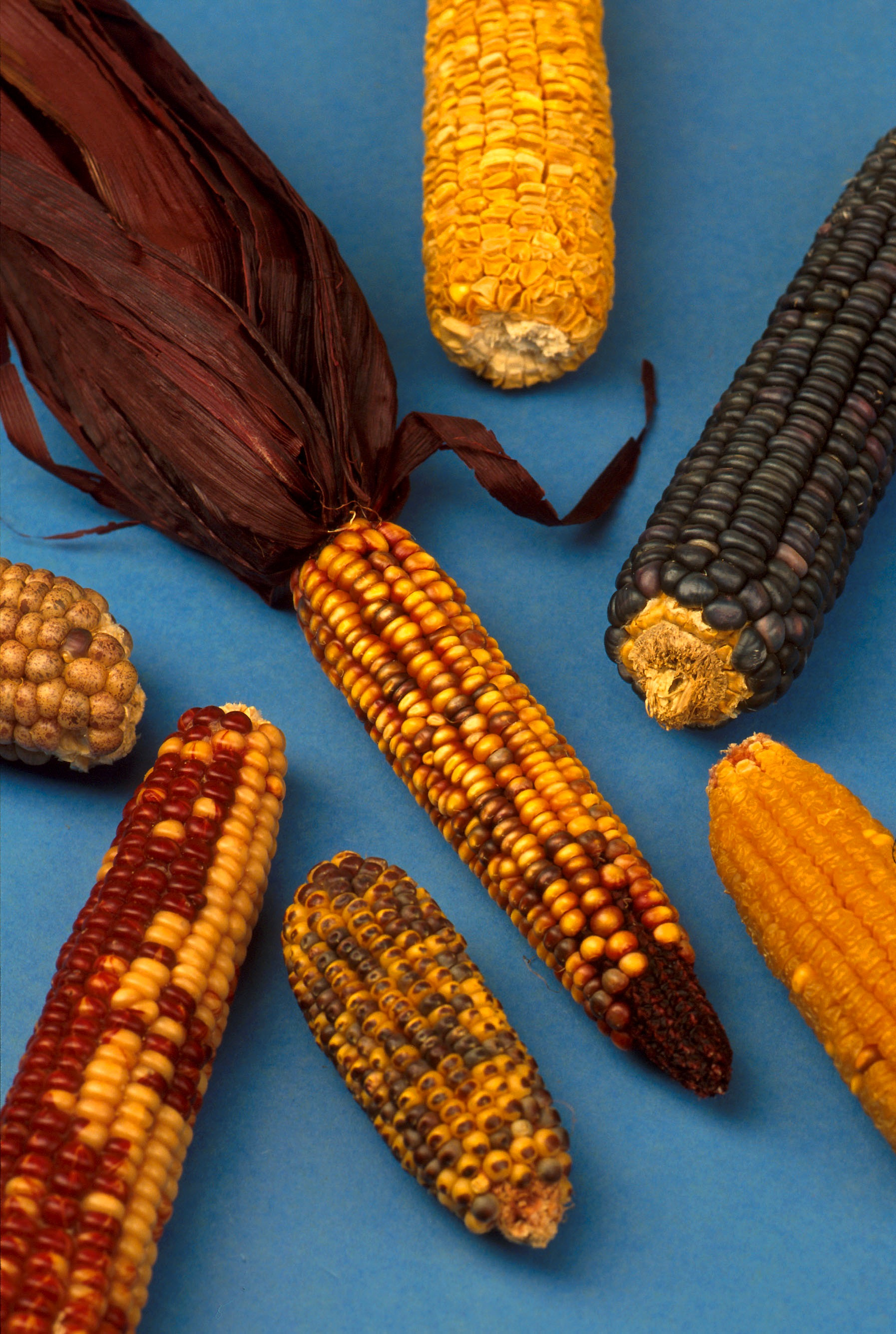
Examples of the diversity of maize

By roughly 6000 BCE, hunter-gatherers living in the highlands and lowlands of Mesoamerica began to develop agricultural practices with early cultivation of squash and chili. The earliest example of maize dates to c. 4000 BCE and comes from Guilá Naquitz, a cave in Oaxaca. Earlier maize samples have been documented at the Los Ladrones cave site in Panama, c. 5500 BCE. Slightly thereafter, semi-agrarian communities began to cultivate other crops throughout Mesoamerica. Maize was the most common domesticate, but the common bean, tepary bean, scarlet runner bean, jicama, tomato and squash all became common cultivates by 3500 BCE. At the same time, these communities exploited cotton, yucca, and agave for fibers and textile materials. By 2000 BCE, corn was the staple crop in the region, and remained so through modern times. The Ramón or Breadnut tree (Brosimum alicastrum) was an occasional substitute for maize in producing flour. Fruit was also important in the daily diet of Mesoamerican cultures. Some of the main ones consumed include avocado, papaya, guava, mamey, zapote, and annona.

Mesoamerica lacked animals suitable for domestication, most notably domesticated large ungulates. The lack of draft animals for transportation is one notable difference between Mesoamerica and the cultures of the South American Andes. Other animals, including the duck, dogs, and turkey, were domesticated. Turkey was the first to be domesticated locally, around 3500 BCE. Dogs were the primary source of animal protein in ancient Mesoamerica, and dog bones are common in midden deposits throughout the region.

Societies of this region did hunt certain wild species for food. These animals included deer, rabbit, birds, and various types of insects. They also hunted for luxury items, such as feline fur and bird plumage.

Mesoamerican cultures that lived in the lowlands and coastal plains settled down in agrarian communities somewhat later than did highland cultures because there was a greater abundance of fruits and animals in these areas, which made a hunter-gatherer lifestyle more attractive. Fishing also was a major provider of food to lowland and coastal Mesoamericans creating a further disincentive to settle down in permanent communities.

=== Political organization ===
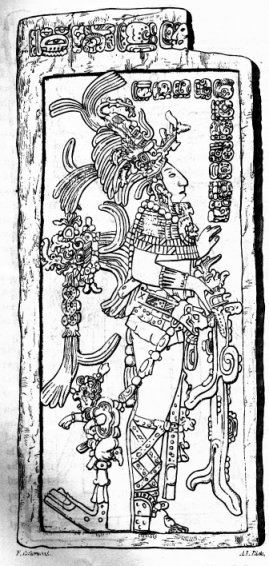
Kʼinich Kan Bahlam II, the Classic period ruler of Palenque, as depicted on a stele

Ceremonial centers were the nuclei of Mesoamerican settlements. Temples and pyramids provided spatial orientation to the surrounding town, and the cities with their commercial and religious centers functioned as political entities comparable to the European city-state. Nearly all Mesoamerican cities served as capitals of polities, and public architecture—pyramids, plazas, and palaces—was overwhelmingly political and religious in function, designed and built by rulers who used urban planning to make political statements.

Ceremonial centers were always built to be visible. Pyramids were meant to stand out from the rest of the city, to represent the gods and their powers. Another characteristic feature of the ceremonial centers is historic layers. All the ceremonial edifices were built in various phases, one on top of the other, to the point that what we now see is usually the last stage of construction. Ultimately, the ceremonial centers were the architectural translation of the identity of cities such as Teotihuacan, as represented by the veneration of their gods. Stelae were common public monuments throughout Mesoamerica and served to commemorate notable successes, events, and dates associated with the rulers and nobility of the various sites.

=== Economy ===
Mesoamerica was broken into numerous and diverse ecological niches, and no single society was self-sufficient. Long-distance trade was generally limited to luxury goods and rare materials, while staple goods moved shorter distances between complementary ecological zones. From the last centuries of the Archaic period (8000 BCE– 1000 BCE) onward, regions compensated for environmental inadequacies by specializing in the extraction of certain abundant natural resources and trading them through established commercial networks.

The major specialized resources traded from each Mesoamerican sub-region included: cotton and cochineal from the Pacific lowlands; cacao, vanilla, jaguar skins, and tropical bird feathers (especially quetzal and macaw) from the Maya lowlands and Gulf Coast; obsidian from central Mexico (Pachuca) and the Guatemalan highlands (San Martin Jilotepeque, El Chayal, and Ixtepeque); pyrite and jade from the Motagua River valley in Guatemala; and salt, dry fish, shell, and dyes from coastal areas. Cacao beans served as a widely accepted medium of exchange and were used as a form of currency throughout the region.

=== Architecture ===
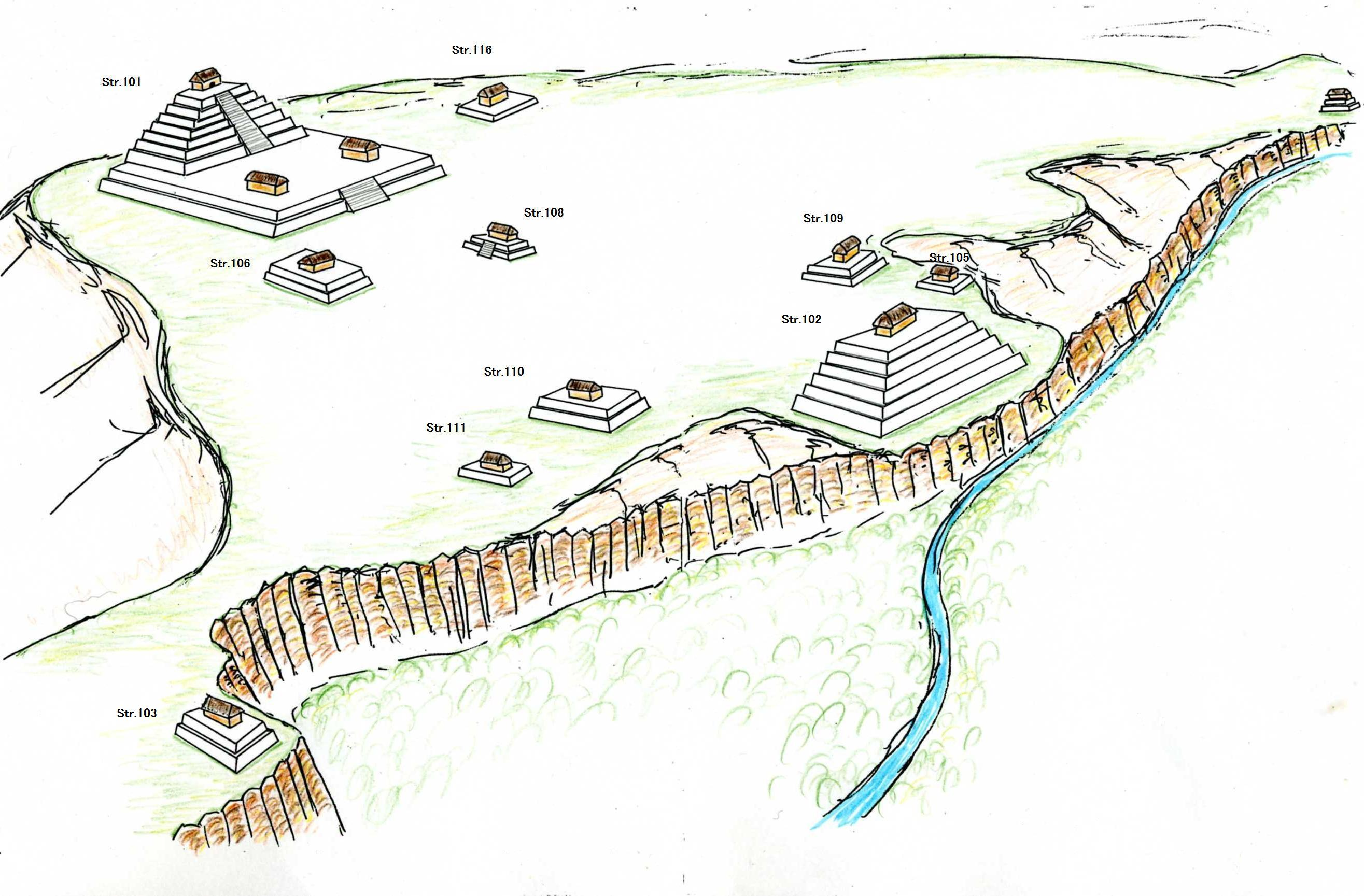
Illustration that recreates the structures of the archaeological site of Yarumela or El Chircal in Honduras, this place reflects the Olmec influence that existed in Central America in the pre-classic period.

Mesoamerican architecture is the collective name given to urban, ceremonial and public structures built by pre-Columbian civilizations in Mesoamerica. Although very different in styles, all kinds of Mesoamerican architecture show some kind of interrelation, due to very significant cultural exchanges that occurred during thousands of years. Among the most well-known structures in Mesoamerica, the flat-top pyramids are a landmark feature of the most developed urban centers.

Two characteristics are most notable in Mesoamerican architecture. Firstly, the intimate connection between geography, astronomy, and architecture: very often, urban centers or even single buildings are aligned to cardinal directions and/or along particular constellations. Secondly, iconography was considered integral part of architecture, with buildings often being adorned with images of religious and cultural significance.

=== Calendrical systems ===
"Head Variant" or "Patron Gods" glyphs for Maya days

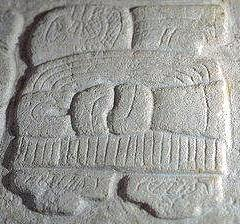
The emblem glyph of Tikal (Mutal)

Agriculturally based people historically divide the year into four seasons. These included the two solstices and the two equinoxes, which could be thought of as the four "directional pillars" that support the year. These four times of the year were, and still are, important as they indicate seasonal changes that directly impact the lives of Mesoamerican agriculturalists.

The Maya closely observed and duly recorded the seasonal markers. They prepared almanacs recording past and recent solar and lunar eclipses, the phases of the moon, the periods of Venus and Mars, the movements of various other planets, and conjunctions of celestial bodies. These almanacs also made future predictions concerning celestial events. These tables are remarkably accurate, given the technology available, and indicate a significant level of knowledge among Maya astronomers.

Among the many types of calendars the Maya maintained, the most important include a 260-day cycle, a 360-day cycle or 'year', a 365-day cycle or year, a lunar cycle, and a Venus cycle, which tracked the synodic period of Venus. Maya of the European contact period said that knowing the past aided in both understanding the present and predicting the future (Diego de Landa). The 260-day cycle was a calendar to govern agriculture, observe religious holidays, mark the movements of celestial bodies, and memorialize public officials. The 260-day cycle was also used for divination, and (like the Catholic calendar of saints) to name newborns.

The names given to the days, months, and years in the Mesoamerican calendar came, for the most part, from animals, flowers, heavenly bodies, and cultural concepts that held symbolic significance in Mesoamerican culture. This calendar was used throughout the history of Mesoamerica by nearly every culture. Even today, several Maya groups in Guatemala, including the Kʼicheʼ, Qʼeqchiʼ, Kaqchikel, and the Mixe people of Oaxaca continue using modernized forms of the Mesoamerican calendar.

=== Writing systems ===
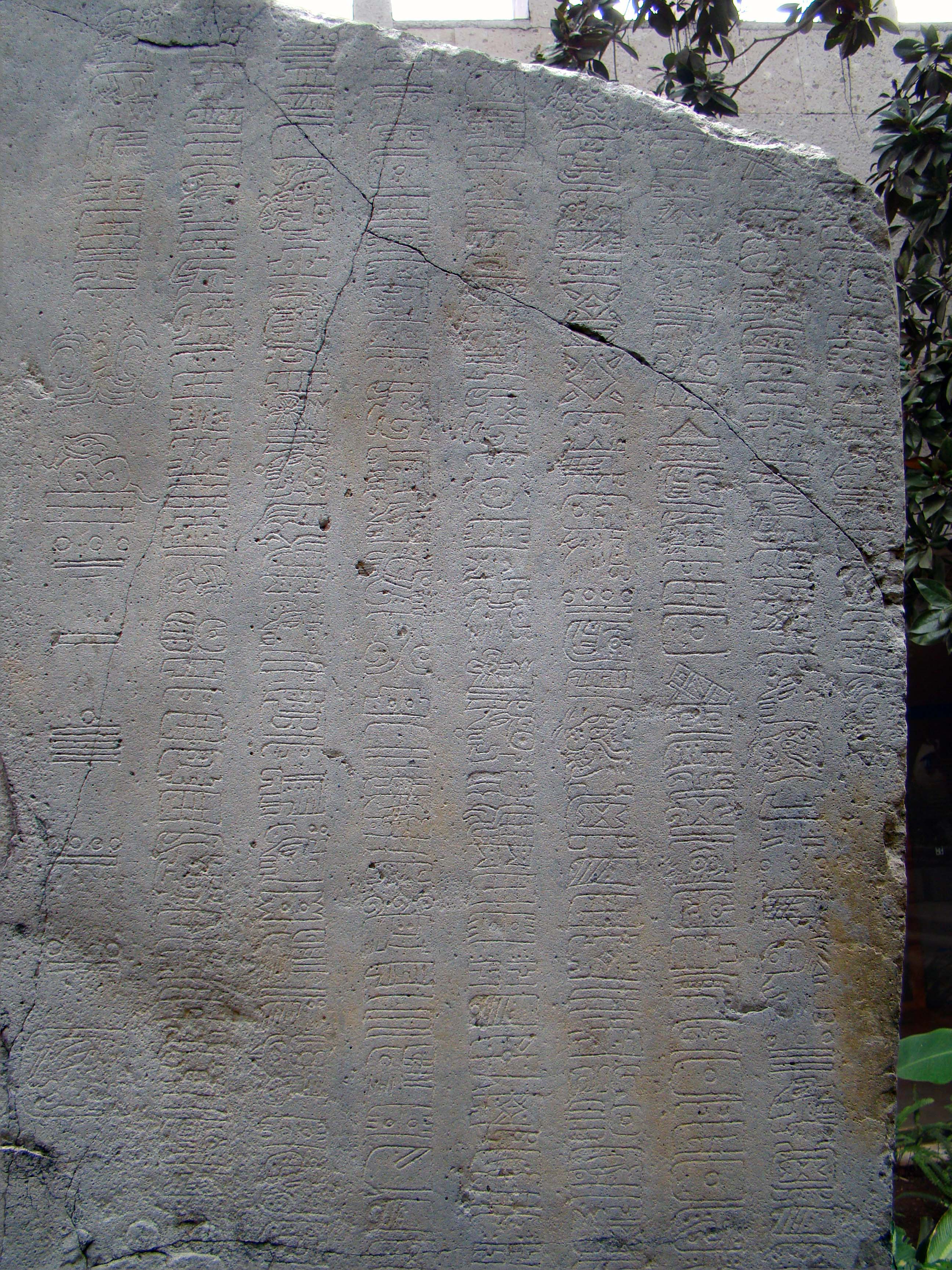
One of the earliest examples of the Mesoamerican writing systems, the Epi-Olmec script on the La Mojarra Stela 1 dated to around 150 CE. Mesoamerica is one of the five places in the world where writing has developed independently.

The Mesoamerican scripts deciphered to date are logosyllabic combining the use of logograms with a syllabary, and they are often called hieroglyphic scripts. Five or six different scripts have been documented in Mesoamerica, but archaeological dating methods, and a certain degree of self-interest, create difficulties in establishing priority and thus the forebear from which the others developed. The best documented and deciphered Mesoamerican writing system, and therefore the most widely known, is the classic Maya script. Others include the Olmec, Zapotec, and Epi-Olmec/Isthmian writing systems. An extensive Mesoamerican literature has been conserved partly in indigenous scripts and partly in the postinvasion transcriptions into Latin script.

The other glyphic writing systems of Mesoamerica, and their interpretation, have been subject to much debate. One important ongoing discussion regards whether non-Maya Mesoamerican texts can be considered examples of true writing or whether non-Maya Mesoamerican texts are best understood as pictographic conventions that express ideas, specifically religious ones, but don't represent the phonetics of spoken language.

Mesoamerican writing is found in several mediums, including large stone monuments such as stelae, carved directly onto architecture, carved or painted over stucco (e.g., murals), and on pottery. No Precolumbian Mesoamerican society is known to have had widespread literacy, and literacy was probably restricted to particular social classes, including scribes, painters, merchants, and the nobility.

The Mesoamerican book was typically written with brush and colored inks on a paper prepared from the inner bark of the Ficus amacus. The book consisted of a long strip of the prepared bark, which was folded like a screenfold to define individual pages. The pages were often covered and protected by elaborately carved book boards. Some books were composed of square pages while others were composed of rectangular pages.

Following the Spanish conquests in the sixteenth century, Spanish friars taught indigenous scribes to write their languages in alphabetic texts. Many oral histories of the prehispanic period were subsequently recorded in alphabetic texts. The indigenous in central and southern Mexico continued to produce written texts in the colonial period, many with pictorial elements. An important scholarly reference work is the Handbook of Middle American Indians, Guide to Ethnohistorical Sources. Mesoamerican codices survive from the Aztec, Maya, Mixtec, and Zapotec regions.

=== Arithmetic ===
The Mesoamerican numbering system was vigesimal (base 20), likely derived from the practice of counting on fingers and toes. In representing numbers, a system of bars and dots was employed: dots had a value of one and bars a value of five. Mesoamerican arithmetic also treated numbers as having symbolic as well as literal value, reflecting the dualistic nature of Mesoamerican ideology: '4' was linked to the four corners of the universe, '9' pertained to the underworld and the night, '13' was the number for light, and '20' represented completeness.

One of the most significant Mesoamerican mathematical achievements was the independent development of the concept of zero as a positional placeholder, one of only a handful of times this concept was independently invented in human history. The earliest known Long Count inscriptions using positional notation date to the first century BCE in the Epi-Olmec cultural sphere: Stela 2 at Chiapa de Corzo (corresponding to 36 BCE) and Tres Zapotes Stela C (corresponding to 32 BCE). The Maya represented zero with a shell glyph and used it extensively in their Long Count calendar and astronomical calculations.

=== Food, medicine, and science ===
Mesoamerica's inhabitants developed a remarkable array of cultivated crops. In terms of harvest weight, maize is today the world's most important crop, and the region also produced tomatoes, peppers, all the world's squashes (except for a few domesticated in the United States), and many of the beans on dinner plates around the world. One estimate suggests that Mesoamerican peoples developed three-fifths of the crops now in global cultivation. Having secured their food supply, Mesoamerican societies turned to intellectual pursuits, independently inventing their own writing, astronomy, and mathematics, including the zero.

Maize played an important role in Mesoamerican feasts due to its symbolic meaning and abundance.

Companion planting was practiced in various forms by the indigenous peoples of the Americas. They domesticated squash 8,000 to 10,000 years ago, then maize, then common beans, forming the Three Sisters agricultural technique. The cornstalk served as a trellis for the beans to climb, and the beans fixed nitrogen, benefitting the maize.

Fray Bernardino de Sahagún collected extensive information on plants, animals, soil types, among other matters from native informants in Book 11, The Earthly Things, of the twelve-volume General History of the Things of New Spain, known as the Florentine Codex, compiled in the third quarter of the sixteenth century. Bernardino de Sahagún reported the ritualistic use of Psilocybe mushrooms known to the Aztecs as teōnanācatl (agglutinative form of teōtl (god, sacred) and nanācatl (mushroom) in Náhuatl). An earlier work, the Badianus Manuscript or Libellus de Medicinalibus Indorum Herbis is another Aztec codex with written text and illustrations collected from the indigenous viewpoint. The ancient Aztecs used a variety of entheogens within their society.

Evidence shows that wild animals were captured and traded for symbolic and ritual purposes.

=== Mythology and worldview ===
Shared traits in Mesoamerican mythology are characterized by their common basis as a religion that—though in many Mesoamerican groups developed into complex polytheistic religious systems—retained some shamanistic elements.

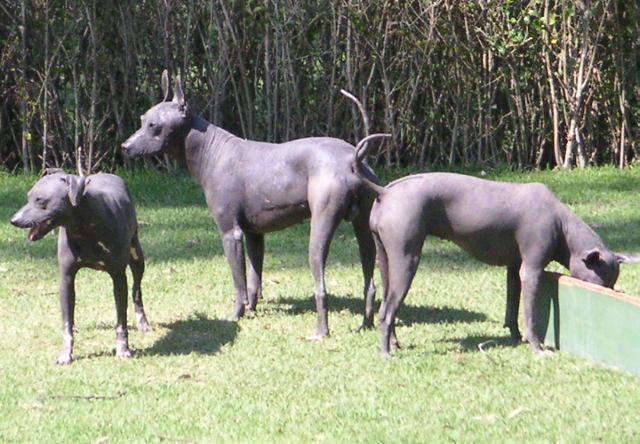
The xoloitzcuintle is one of the naguales of the god Quetzalcoatl. In this form, it helps the dead cross the Chicnahuapan, a river that separates the world of the living from the dead.

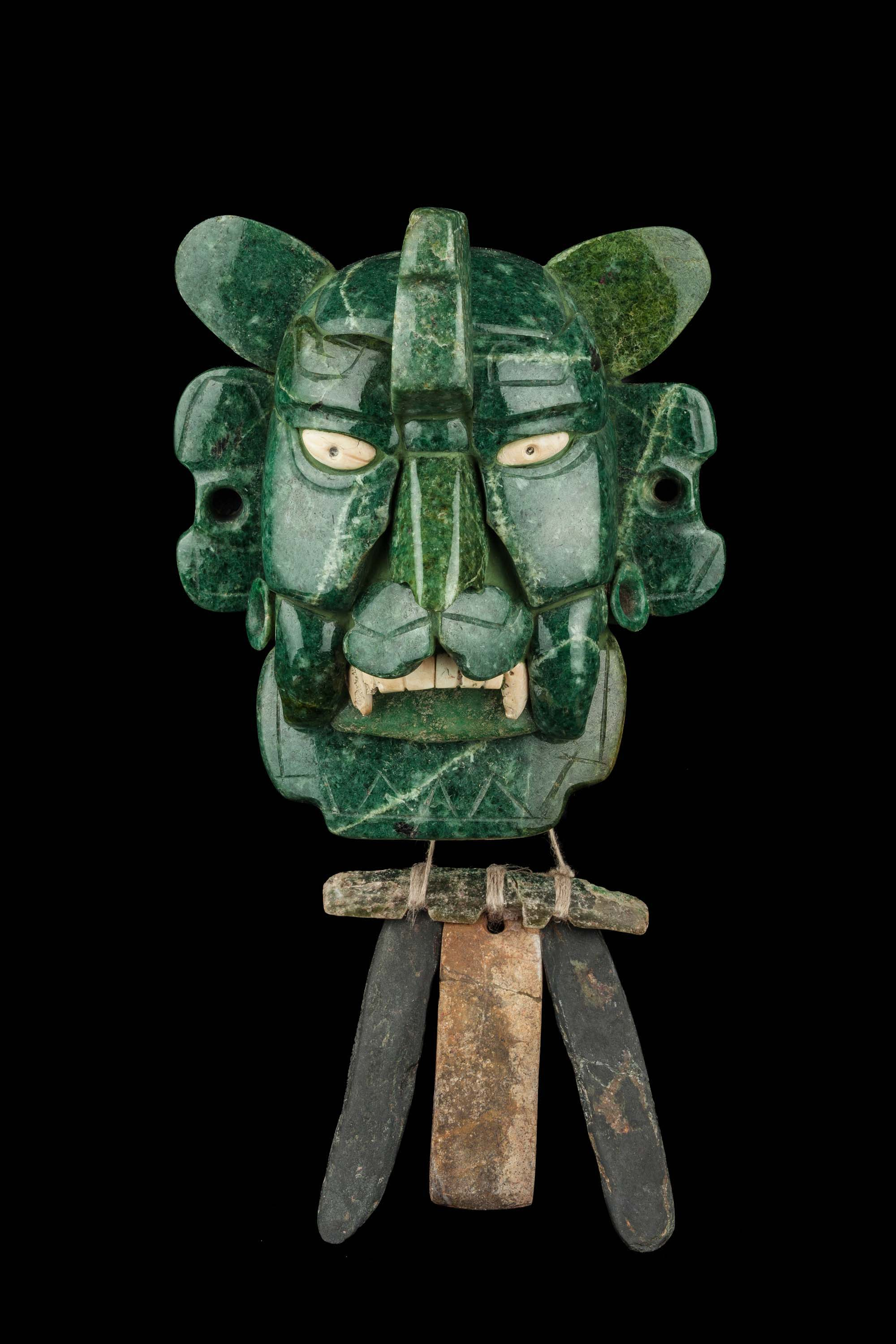
Zapotec mask of the Bat God.

The great breadth of the Mesoamerican pantheon of deities is due to the incorporation of ideological and religious elements from the first primitive religion of Fire, Earth, Water and Nature. Astral divinities (the sun, stars, constellations, and Venus) were adopted and represented in anthropomorphic, zoomorphic, and anthropozoomorphic sculptures, and in day-to-day objects. The qualities of these gods and their attributes changed over time and with cultural influences from other Mesoamerican groups.

The typical Mesoamerican cosmology sees the world as separated into a day world watched by the sun and a night world watched by the moon. More importantly, the three superposed levels of the world are united by a Ceiba tree (Yaxche in Mayan). The geographic vision is also tied to the cardinal points. Certain geographical features are linked to different parts of this cosmovision. Thus mountains and tall trees connect the middle and upper worlds; caves connect the middle and nether worlds.

==== Sacrifice ====
Generally, sacrifice in Mesoamerica can be divided into two types: autosacrifice and human sacrifice. The different forms of sacrifice are reflected in the imagery used to evoke ideological structure and sociocultural organization in Mesoamerica. In the Maya area, for example, steles depict bloodletting rituals performed by ruling elites, eagles and jaguars devouring human hearts, jade circles or necklaces that represented hearts, and plants and flowers that symbolized both nature and the blood that provided life. Imagery also showed pleas for rain or pleas for blood, with the same intention to replenish the divine energy. Ritual sacrifice was done in efforts to appease the gods, and was done with the purpose of protection of the population.

===== Autosacrifice =====
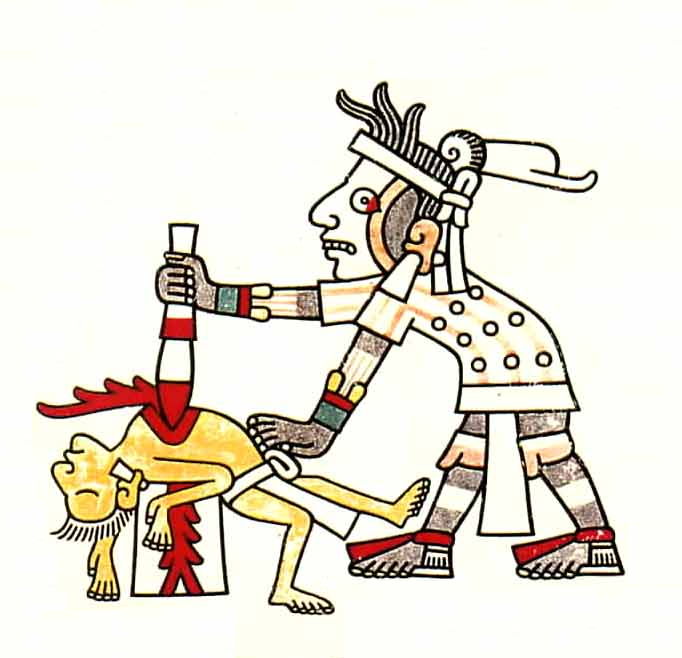
Ritual human sacrifice portrayed in Codex Laud

Autosacrifice, also called bloodletting, is the ritualized practice of drawing blood from oneself. It is commonly seen or represented through iconography as performed by ruling elites in highly ritualized ceremonies, but it was easily practiced in mundane sociocultural contexts (i.e., non-elites could perform autosacrifice). The act was typically performed with obsidian prismatic blades or stingray spines, and blood was drawn from piercing or cutting the tongue, earlobes, and/or genitals (among other locations). Another form of autosacrifice was conducted by pulling a rope with attached thorns through the tongue or earlobes. The blood produced was then collected on amate held in a bowl.

Autosacrifice was not limited to male rulers, as their female counterparts often performed these ritualized activities. They are typically shown performing the rope and thorns technique. A recently discovered queen's tomb in the Classic Maya site of Waka (also known as El Perú) had a ceremonial stingray spine placed in her genital area, suggesting that women also performed bloodletting in their genitalia.

===== Human sacrifice =====
Human sacrifice had great importance in the social and religious life of Mesoamerican cultures. Within this worldview, death through sacrifice was not an end but a continuation of the cosmic cycle: the vital energy contained in the heart and blood—what the Aztecs called teyolia, a kind of divine fire animating the human body—was released through death and returned to the gods, enabling them to sustain the world. The practice also served to justify warfare, since the most valued sacrificial offerings were warriors captured in battle. The Aztec belief that the sun required the energy of sacrificed warriors to complete its daily journey made warfare and captive-taking both a religious obligation and a means of social advancement. The ritual system reinforced the power of the two ruling classes: the priests, who controlled religious ideology, and the warriors, who supplied the sacrifices.

Human sacrifice was a long-standing practice in Mesoamerica, with archaeological evidence suggesting it existed from at least the time of the Olmecs (1200–400 BCE) and continued through the Aztec period, though the scale of Aztec sacrifice was likely unprecedented in the region. It was also believed that some individuals were chosen by the gods for sacrifice, marked by signs such as being struck by lightning.

==== Ballgame ====
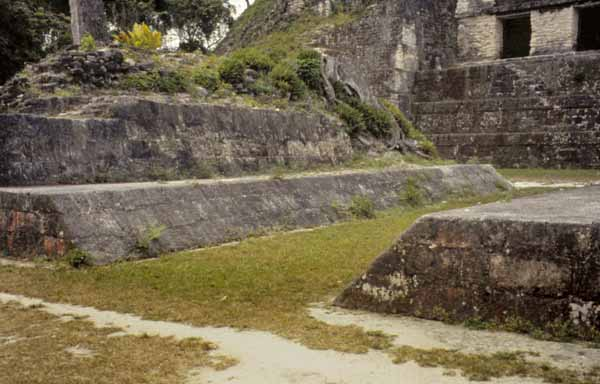
A small ceremonial ballcourt at Tikal.

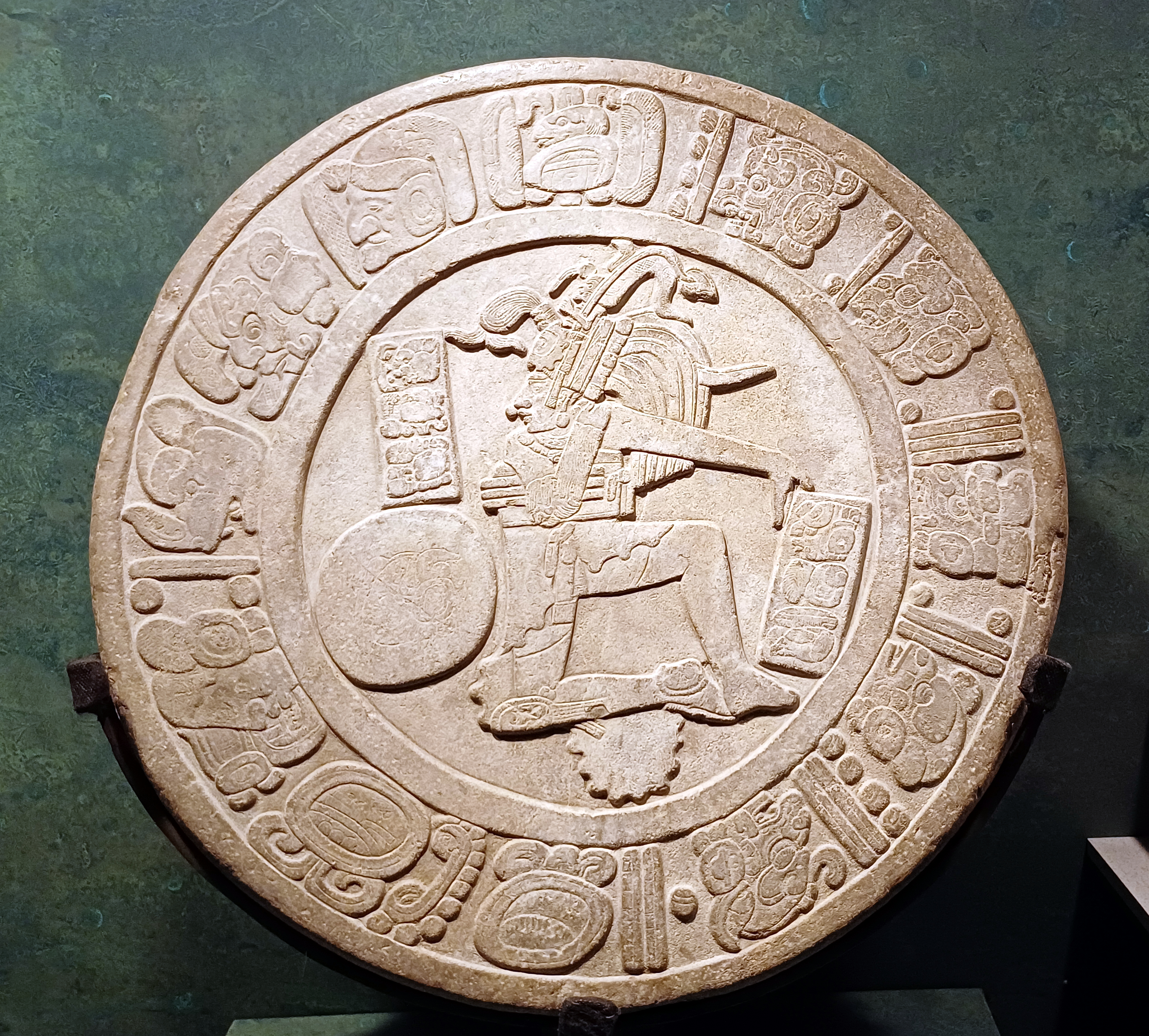
Ballgame marker from the classic Lowland Maya site of Chinkultic, Mexico depicting a ballplayer in full gear

The Mesoamerican ballgame was a sport with ritual associations played for over 3000 years by nearly all pre-Columbian peoples of Mesoamerica. The sport had different versions in different places during the millennia, and a modern version of the game, ulama, is still played in a few places.

Over 1300 ballcourts have been found throughout Mesoamerica. They vary considerably in size, but they all feature long narrow alleys with side walls to bounce the balls against.

The rules of the ballgame are not known, but it was probably similar to volleyball, where the object is to keep the ball in play. In the most well-known version of the game, the players struck the ball with their hips, though some versions used forearms or employed rackets, bats, or handstones. The ball was made of solid rubber, and weighed up to 4 kg or more, with sizes that differed greatly over time or according to the version played.

While the game was played casually for simple recreation, including by children and perhaps even women, the game also had important ritual aspects, and major formal ballgames were held as ritual events, often featuring human sacrifice.

==== Astronomy ====
Mesoamerican astronomy included a broad understanding of the cycles of planets and other celestial bodies. Special importance was given to the sun, moon, and Venus as the morning and evening star.

Observatories were built at some sites, including the round observatory at Ceibal and the "Observatorio" at Xochicalco. Often, the architectural organization of Mesoamerican sites was based on precise calculations derived from astronomical observations. Well-known examples of these include the El Castillo pyramid at Chichen Itza and the Observatorio at Xochicalco. A unique and common architectural complex found among many Mesoamerican sites is the E-Group; these are aligned to serve as astronomical observatories. The name of this complex is based on Uaxactun's "Group E", the first known observatory in the Maya area. Perhaps the earliest observatory documented in Mesoamerica is that of the Monte Alto culture. This complex consisted of three plain stelae and a temple oriented with respect to the Pleiades.

==== Symbolism of space and time ====
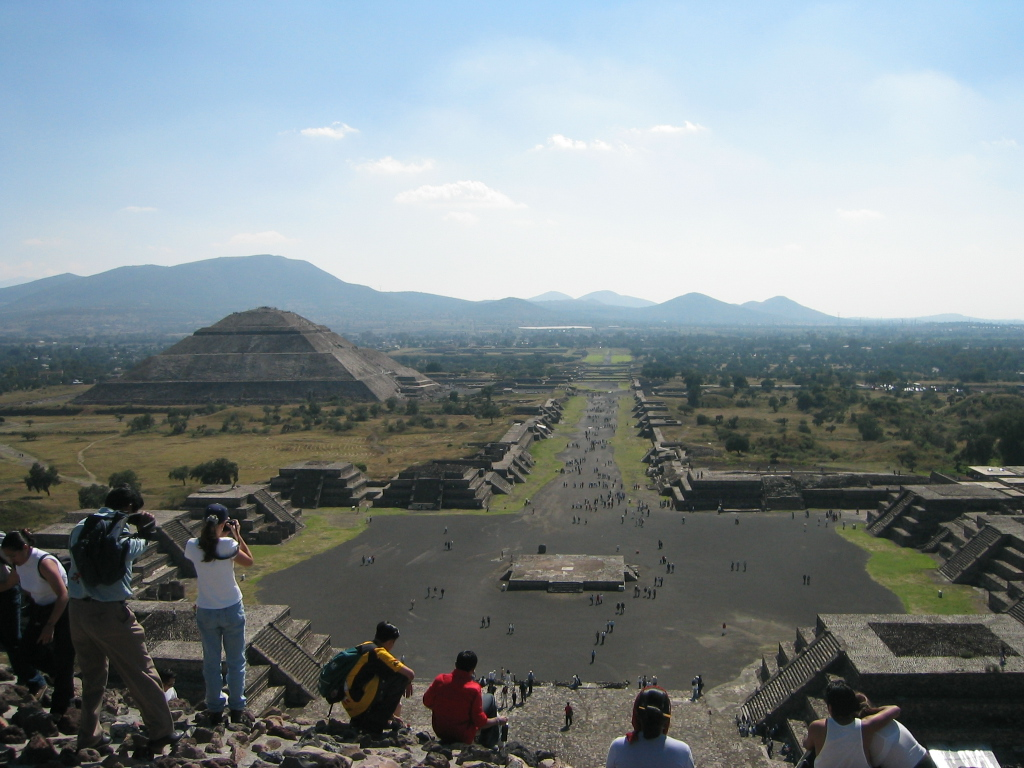
The Avenue of the Dead in Teotihuacan, an example of a Mesoamerican settlement planned according to concepts of directionality

Among Mesoamerican societies the concepts of space and time are associated with the four cardinal compass points and linked together by the calendar. Dates or events were always tied to a compass direction, and the calendar specified the symbolic geographical characteristic peculiar to that period. Resulting from the significance held by the cardinal directions, many Mesoamerican architectural features, if not entire settlements, were planned and oriented according to directionality.

In Maya cosmology, each cardinal point was assigned a specific color and a specific jaguar deity (Bacab). They are as follows: Hobnil, Bacab of the East, associated with the color red and the Kan years; Can Tzicnal, Bacab of the North, assigned the color white and the Muluc years; Zac Cimi, Bacab of the West, associated with the color black and the Ix years; and Hozanek, Bacab of the South, associated with the color yellow and the Cauac years. Later cultures such as the Kaqchikel and Kʼicheʼ maintain the association of cardinal directions with each color, but use different names.

Among the Aztecs, the name of each day was associated with a cardinal point, and each cardinal direction carried a cluster of symbolic associations. The East was linked to the world of priests and vegetative fertility, associated with the crocodile, the serpent, water, cane, and movement. The North, by contrast, was conceptualized as dry, cold, and oppressive—the nocturnal part of the universe, including the dwellings of the dead—and was associated with wind, death, the dog, the jaguar, and flint (or chert). The dog (xoloitzcuintle) held a specific meaning, as it was believed to accompany the deceased during the journey to the lands of the dead and help them cross the river of death (see also Dogs in Mesoamerican folklore and myth). The West was associated with the cycles of temperate vegetation, light rains, and the change of seasons, represented by the house, the deer, the monkey, the eagle, and rain. The South was related to the luminous sun and midday heat, associated with the rabbit, the lizard, dried herbs, the buzzard, and flowers. The rabbit, principal symbol of the South, was linked to farmers and to pulque.

=== Political and religious art ===
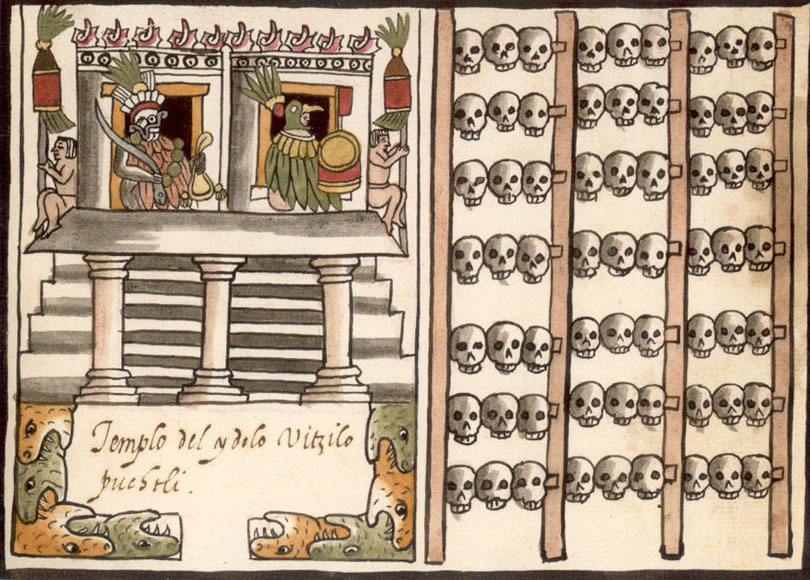
Art with ideological and political meaning: depiction of an Aztec tzompantli (skull-rack) from the Ramirez Codex

Mesoamerican artistic expression was conditioned by ideology and generally focused on themes of religion and/or sociopolitical power. This is largely based on the fact that most works that survived the Spanish conquest were public monuments. These monuments were typically erected by rulers who sought to visually legitimize their sociocultural and political position; by doing so, they intertwined their lineage, personal attributes and achievements, and legacy with religious concepts. As such, these monuments were specifically designed for public display and took many forms, including stele, sculpture, architectural reliefs, and other types of architectural elements (e.g., roofcombs). Other themes expressed include tracking time, glorifying the city, and veneration of the gods—all of which were tied to explicitly aggrandizing the abilities and the reign of the ruler who commissioned the artwork.

=== Music ===
Archaeological studies have never discovered any written music from the pre-Columbian era, but musical instruments were found, as well as carvings and depictions, that clearly show how music played a central role in the Mayan religious and societal structures, for example, as accompaniment to celebrations and funerals. Some Mesoamerican civilizations, such as the Maya, commonly played various instruments such as drums, flutes and whistles. Although most of the original Mayan music disappeared following the Spanish colonization, some of it mixed with the incoming Spanish music and exists to date.

== See also ==
- Aridoamerica
- Oasisamerica
- Mesoamerican Region
- Americas (terminology)
- Americas
- North America
- Central America
- Middle America (Americas)
- South America
- Andean world
- Hispanic America
- Latin America
- Hispanic and Latino Americans
- Indigenous peoples of Mexico
- Indigenous peoples of the Americas
- Painting in the Americas before European colonization

== Bibliography ==
- Campbell, Lyle; Kaufman, Terrence; Smith-Stark, Thomas (September 1986). "Meso-America as a linguistic area". Language. 62 (3): 530–58. doi:10.2307/415477. ISSN 0097-8507. JSTOR 415477. OCLC 1361911.
- Carmack, Robert M.; Gasco, Janine L.; Gossen, Gary H. (1996). Legacy of Mesoamerica, The: History and Culture of a Native American Civilization. New Jersey: Prentice Hall. ISBN 978-0-13-337445-2.
- Carrasco, Davíd (2001). "Mesoamerica: An Overview". In Davíd Carrasco (ed.). The Oxford Encyclopedia of Mesoamerican Cultures. Vol. 2. New York: Oxford University Press. pp. 212–216. ISBN 978-0-19-510815-6. OCLC 1169898498. Archived from the original on 2020-08-09.
- Coe, Michael D. (1994) [1962]. Mexico: from the Olmecs to the Aztecs (4th ed.). New York: Thames & Hudson. ISBN 978-0-500-27722-5.
- Diehl, Richard A. (2004). The Olmecs: America's First Civilization. London: Thames & Hudson. ISBN 978-0-500-28503-9.
- Diamond, Jared (1999). Guns, Germs and Steel: The Fates of Human Societies. New York: W.W. Norton & Co. ISBN 978-0-393-31755-8.
- Duverger, Ch. (1999). La Méso-Amérique: L'art pré-hispanique du Mexique et de l'Amérique centrale (in French). Paris: Flammarion.
- Fagan, Brian M., ed. (1996). The Oxford Companion to Archaeology. Oxford University Press. ISBN 978-0-19-507618-9. Archived from the original on 2022-10-16.
- Filloy Nadal, Laura (2001). "Rubber and Rubber Balls in Mesoamerica". In E. Michael Whittington (ed.). The Sport of Life and Death: The Mesoamerican Ballgame. New York: Thames & Hudson. pp. 20–31. ISBN 978-0-500-05108-5.
- Fitzsimmons, James L. (2009). Death And The Classic Maya Kings, Chapter Three Royal Funerals. Austin: University of Texas Press. ISBN 978-0-292-79370-5.
- Grofe, Michael J. (2016), "Astronomy in Mesoamerica", in Selin, Helaine (ed.), Encyclopaedia of the History of Science, Technology, and Medicine in Non-Western Cultures, Dordrecht: Springer Netherlands, pp. 1–12, doi:10.1007/978-94-007-3934-5_10270-2, ISBN 978-94-007-3934-5
- Kirchhoff, Paul (1943). "Mesoamérica. Sus Límites Geográficos, Composición Étnica y Caracteres Culturales". Acta Americana (in Spanish). 1 (1): 92–107.
- Leyenaar, Ted (2001). "The Modern Ballgames of Sinaloa: a Survival of the Aztec Ullamaliztli". In E. Michael Whittington (ed.). The Sport of Life and Death: The Mesoamerican Ballgame. New York: Thames & Hudson. pp. 97–115. ISBN 978-0-500-05108-5.
- López Austin, Alfredo (1988). The Human Body and Ideology: Concepts of the Ancient Nahuas. Vol. 1. University of Utah Press. ISBN 978-0-87480-291-7.
- Miller, Mary; Taube, Karl (1993). The Gods and Symbols of Ancient Mexico and the Maya: An Illustrated Dictionary of Mesoamerican Religion. London: Thames & Hudson. ISBN 978-0-500-05068-2. OCLC 27667317.
- O'Brien, Patrick, ed. (2005). Oxford Atlas of World History. New York: Oxford University Press.
- Ortiz de Montellano, B. (1990). Aztec medicine, health, and nutrition. Mazal Holocaust Collection. New Brunswick: Rutgers University Press. ISBN 0-8135-1562-9. OCLC 20798977.
- Šprajc, Ivan (June 2011). "Astronomy and its role in ancient Mesoamerica". The Role of Astronomy in Society and Culture. 260: 87–95. Bibcode:2011IAUS..260...87S. doi:10.1017/S1743921311002171. ISSN 1743-9221.
- Sugiyama, Nawa; Fash, William L.; France, Christine A. M. (2018). "Jaguar and puma captivity and trade among the Maya: Stable isotope data from Copan, Honduras". PLOS ONE. 13 (9) e0202958. Bibcode:2018PLoSO..1302958S. doi:10.1371/journal.pone.0202958. PMC 6135383. PMID 30208053.
- Taladoire, Eric (2001). "The Architectural Background of the Pre-Hispanic Ballgame". In E. Michael Whittington (ed.). The Sport of Life and Death: The Mesoamerican Ballgame. New York: Thames & Hudson. pp. 97–115. ISBN 978-0-500-05108-5.
