= Edzna =

Maya archaeological site

Coordinates: 19°35′48.48″N 90°13′44.76″W

- House of the Itzaes
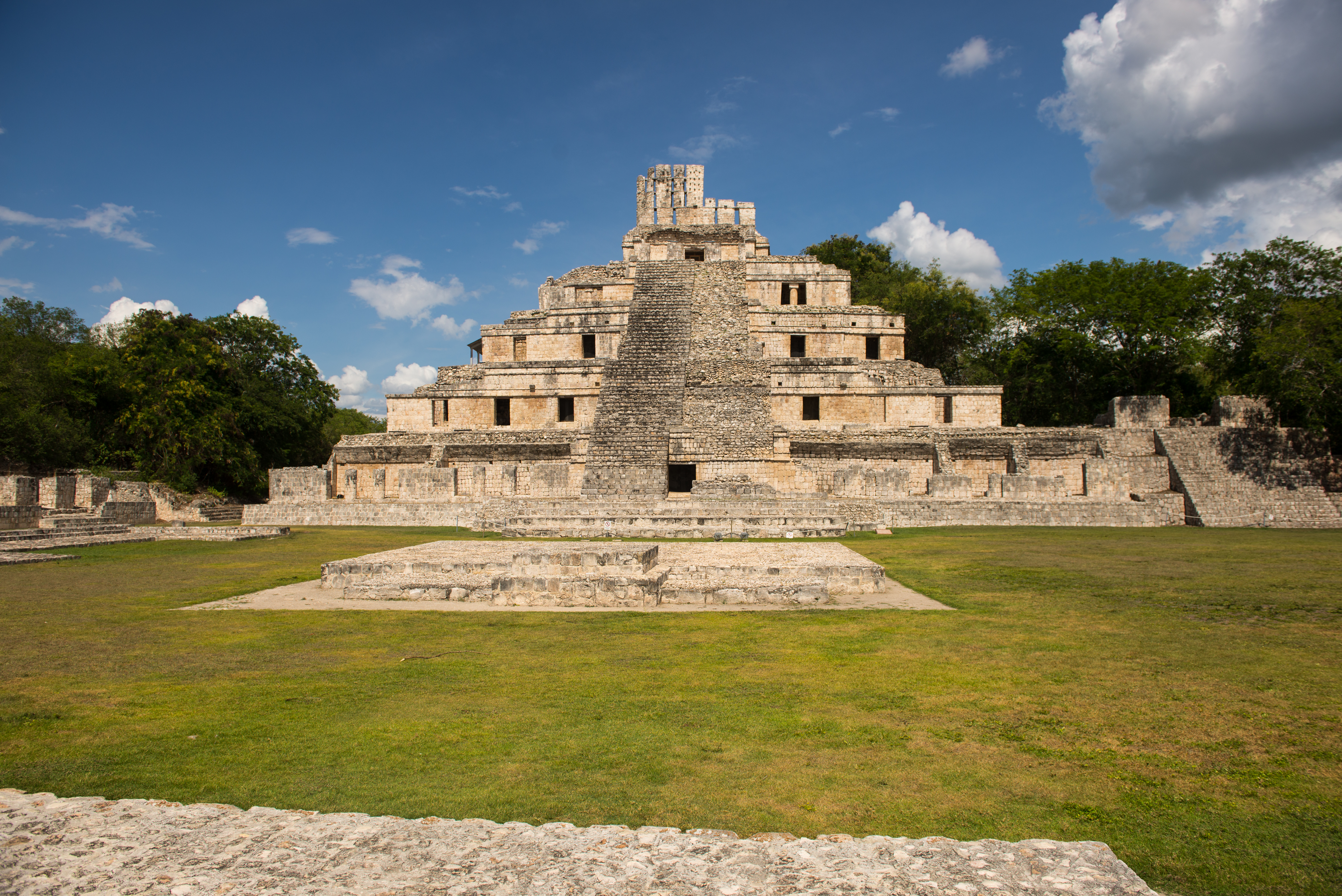

- Location within Campeche Location within Mexico
- Cultures: Maya
- Location: Campeche, Mexico

History
- Abandoned: c. 1500 AD

Site notes
- Material: Limestone
- Excavation dates: 1958-
- Discovered: 1907
- Public access: yes

Edzná ("House of the Itzaes") is a Maya archaeological site in the north of the Mexican state of Campeche. The site has been open to visitors since the 1970s.

The most remarkable building at the site is the main temple located at the plaza. Built on a platform 40 m high, it provides a wide overview of the surroundings. Another significant building located in the plaza is the ball court, composed of two parallel structures. The top rooms of the ball court were possibly used to store images of the gods associated with the events, along with items needed for the games.

Edzná was already inhabited by 400 BC, and was abandoned c. 1500 AD. During the time of occupation, a government was set up whose power was legitimized by the relationship between governors and the deities. In the Late Classic period, Edzná was part of the Calakmul polity. The city may have been inhabited by as early as 600 BC, but it took until 200 AD before it developed into a major city. The architectural style of this site shows signs of the Puuc style, although it is far from the Puuc Hills sites. The decline and eventual abandonment of Edzná remains a mystery today.

Edzná was discovered in 1907, and the first organized excavations began in 1958. In 1986, coordinating agencies began to employ Guatemalan refugees in the excavation, restoration, and maintenance at Edzná. This project was funded by various international organizations.

Plaza of Edzná, viewed from the main temple

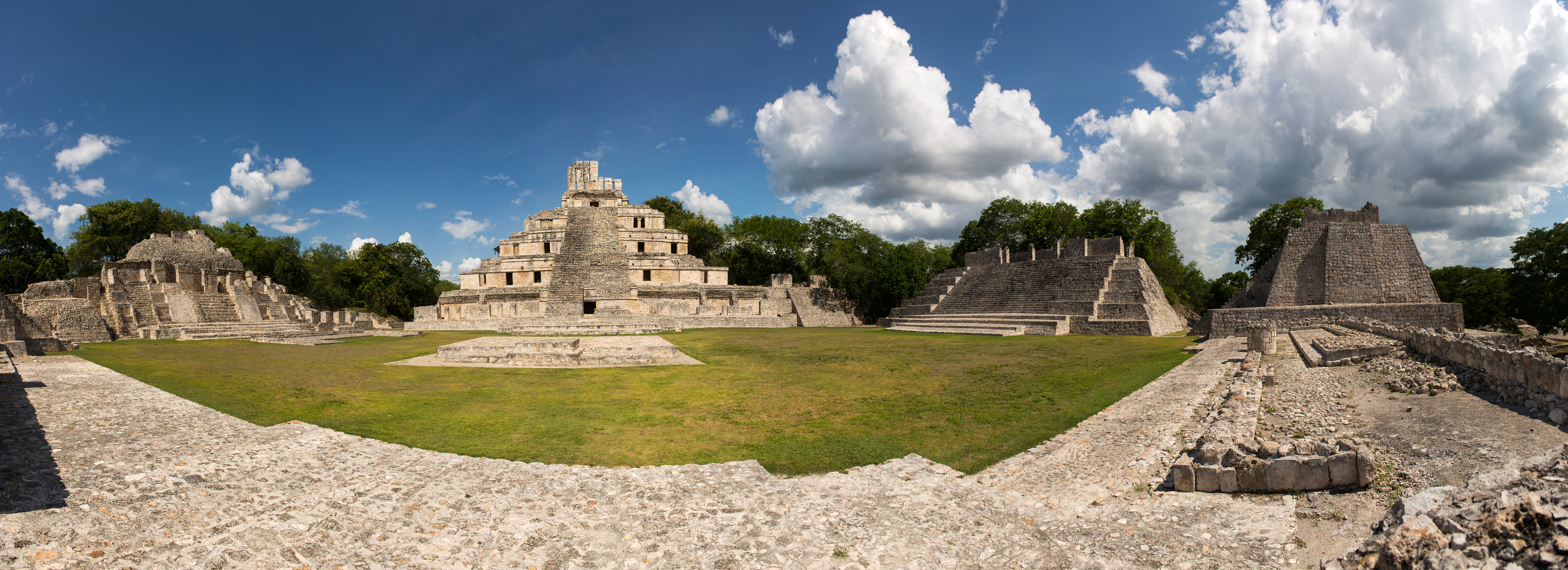
Plaza of Edzná, viewed from ground level in 2015.
