= Foundation for the Advancement of Mesoamerican Studies =

American research foundation active 1993-2012

Foundation for the Advancement of Mesoamerican Studies, Inc.
- FAMSI logo
- Other name: FAMSI
- Established: 1993
- Mission: to foster increased understanding of ancient Mesoamerican cultures
- Director: Sandra Noble
- Address: 268 S Suncoast Blvd; Crystal River FL 34429; USA
- Coordinates: 28.8584°N 82.5809°W
- Interactive map of Foundation for the Advancement of Mesoamerican Studies, Inc.
- Website: famsi.org
- Dissolved: 30 September 2012
- [Infobox data per APA 2022 or GS 2022a.]

The Foundation for the Advancement of Mesoamerican Studies, Inc., or FAMSI, is a website used for research in pre-Columbian studies and ancient Mesoamerican cultures. FAMSI was formerly an American not-for-profit grant-making research foundation, established 1993 and based in Crystal River, Florida. It provided research grants and resources to scholars focussing on ancient Mesoamerican cultures, including the Olmec, Maya, Aztec, and others. Grants were available for projects in archaeology, art history, linguistics, ethnography, epigraphy, sociology, and ethnohistory. The non-profit dissolved in 2012, but its research website has remained active under the administration of the Los Angeles County Museum of Art since 2012.

== Activities ==
=== Funding ===
During 1993–2007, the Foundation granted 3.2 million US dollars to 445 research projects, with a little under two-thirds of these being archaeological, and the remaining third being work in anthropology, art history, and linguistics, in that order. Grants were suspended starting in 2007 'due to unforeseen and unfortunate circumstances.'

=== Other ===
The Foundation maintained an in-house Mesoamerican library of 6,500 volumes, and provided freely-accessible resources via their website, including a Mesoamerican bibliography of 75,000 titles. (Note: The library is elsewhere described as 'a Mesoamerican-oriented library that includes over 2600 volumes donated by Michael D. Coe,' possibly including the Barbara & Justin Kerr Photographic Collection, the Linda & David Schele Image Collection, the John Montgomery Drawing Collection, and the Bibliografia Mesoamericana (GS 2022a, sec. 'Programs and results' subsec. 'Our programs').) The Foundation's website, published in 1997, is thought to have been 'the first publicly available website dedicated to the study of ancient Mesoamerica.' All resources, including digital ones, have been housed or maintained by the Los Angeles County Museum of Art since 2012.
