= Warn Industries =

American vehicle accessory manufacturer

Warn Industries, Inc.
- Industry: Manufacturing
- Founded: Seattle, USA, 1948
- Founder: Arthur Warn
- Headquarters: Clackamas, Oregon, USA
- Area served: World
- Products: Vehicle recovery products and off-road vehicle accessories
- Number of employees: 500
- Parent: LKQ Corporation
- Divisions: Truck, Powersports, Industrial, Commercial, OEM
- Website: http://www.warn.com

Warn Industries is a manufacturer of vehicle recovery equipment and off-road vehicle accessories. The company produces products for use on trucks (i.e. Ram Power Wagon 2005–present), powersports vehicles, wreckers, military vehicles, and trailers. Warn Industries is based in Clackamas, Oregon, a suburb of Portland.

== History ==
The company was founded in 1948 by Arthur Warn, who invented a locking hub system designed for use on surplus World War II Jeep vehicles. Originally based in Seattle, Washington, Mr. Warn worked with Belleview Manufacturing of Portland, Oregon to manufacture the bolt-on/bolt-off hubs. By 1954, the hubs were available as optional equipment through several major automakers.

In the late 1950s, Warn Industries pioneered the development of the electric winch for use on a recreational vehicle. Previous to the electric winch, most users of four-wheel drive vehicles utilized a winch driven by a power take-off (PTO) system of hydraulic system. However, PTO and hydraulic winches will only operate if the vehicle is running. The application of the electric winch would allow for vehicle self recovery, even if the engine had stalled. The first unit sold was initially called the Model 6000 (M6000), although it became known as the Belleview. It had a capacity of 6,000 lbs. In 1974, the company would update its Belleview winch to the M8274, which featured more modern components and an 8,000 lb. capacity. In 1968, Thurston Warn was named president of Warn Industries, and in the 1970s, the company established a relationship with Ford Motor Company, and began producing hub sets for the automobile manufacturer. Additionally, the company moved to the Portland, Oregon suburb of Clackamas in the '70s. In 1984, Mike Warn became president of Warn Industries.

Warn Industries was sold in 2000 to Endeavor Capital & Northwest Equity. In 2003, the Dover Corporation acquired Warn Industries for $325 million.

The company has won a number awards for its products, most recently winning a "gold" Excellence Award from Ford Motor Company for being a top-tier supplier to the automobile manufacturer. Warn Industries supplies Ford Motor Company with wheel-end disconnects (automatic locking hubs) for a number of its pickup models.

In 2017, Warn Industries was split into two companies, Warn Automotive and Warn Industries. Warn's aftermarket automotive segment was acquired by LKQ Corporation, placing the company into LKQ's Specialty Segment, Keystone Automotive Operations, Inc. The aftermarket division retained the Warn Industries name and operates out of their Clackamas, Oregon facility. Warn Industries product lineup includes winches, bumpers, hubs, and accessories for trucks, SUVs, ATVs, utilities, and off-road vehicles. Dover Corporation retained Warn's OEM business, rebranded as Warn Automotive. Based in their Milwaukie, Oregon facility, Warn Automotive focuses on powertrain & drivetrain products for OEM applications, including electronic disconnects, torque transfer systems, and decoupling devices

== Products ==
Warn Industries offers products including:

- Electric Winches
- Hydraulic Winches
- Electric Hoists
- Hydraulic Hoists
- Winching Accessories
- Winch Mounting Systems
- Off-Road Bumpers
- Off-Road Lights
- Plow Systems
- Four-Wheel Drive Hubs
- Fender Flares
- Skid Plates
