= VCM =

VCM may refer to:

== People ==
- Victoria Coren Mitchell, (Born 18 August 1972) an English writer, presenter and professional poker player

== Science and technology ==
- Variable Cylinder Management, Honda's term for a variable-displacement technology
- Variable Coding and Modulation, a technique for optimizing satellite broadcasts
- Vinyl chloride monomer, a compound used to produce polyvinyl chloride
- Virtual Channel Memory, a memory architecture which was originally developed by NEC
- Voice Coil Motor, an electric linear motor used to position hard drive heads.

== Society and culture ==
- Vermont City Marathon, a marathon in Burlington, Vermont
- Vecima networks, a maker of telecommunications equipment
- Victoria Conservatory of Music, a Canadian music school
- Vienna City Marathon, a marathon in Vienna, Austria
- Virtual Collection of Masterpieces, a search platform to a collection of Asian masterpieces
- Voce del padrone-Columbia-Marconiphone, an Italian record label.
