= Wereldmuseum Leiden =

Ethnographic museum in the Netherlands

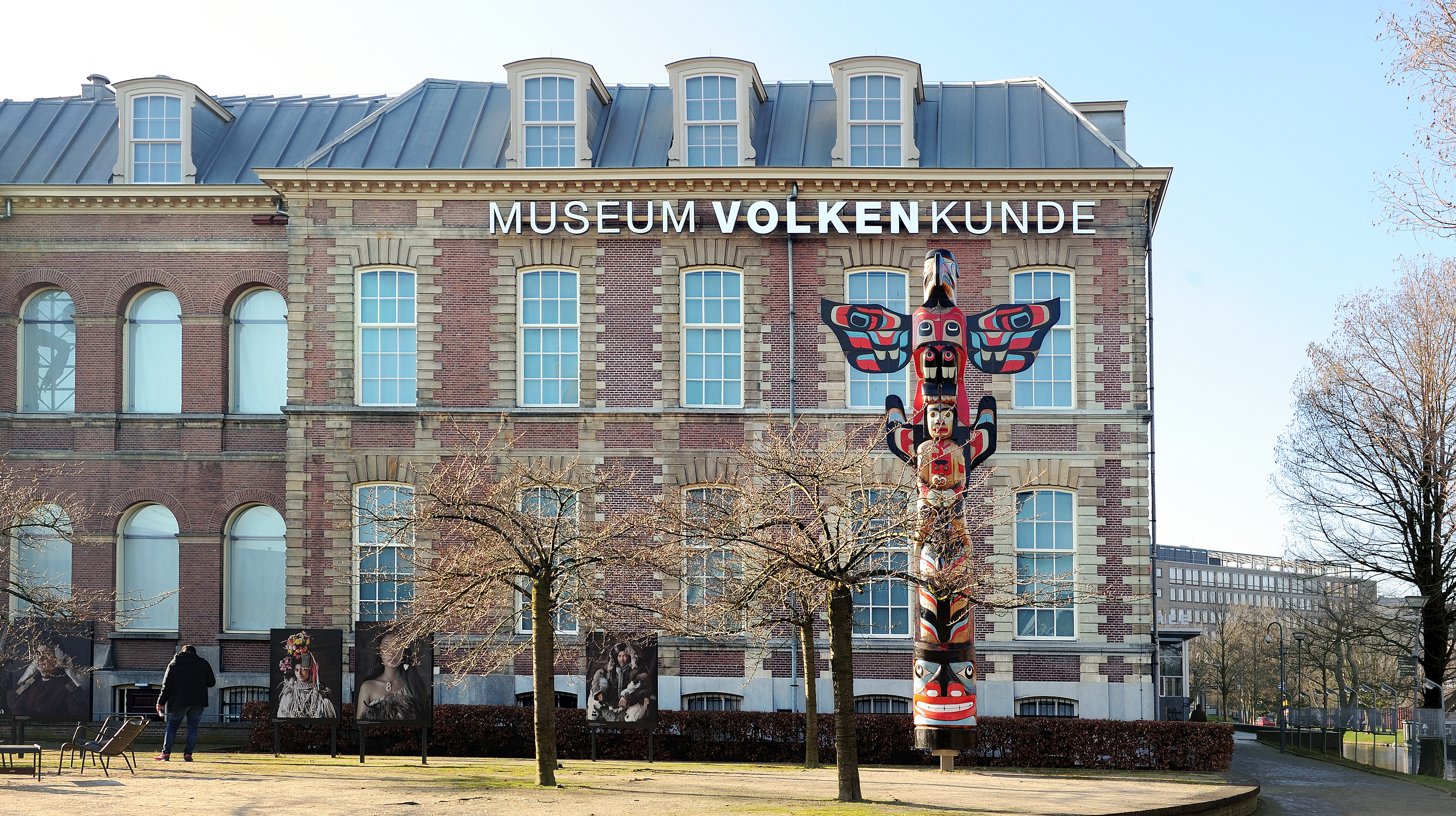
- Werldmuseum Leiden
- Former name: The National Museum of Ethnology in Leiden, Museum Volkenkunde
- Established: 1837
- Location: Leiden, Netherlands
- Coordinates: 52.163056°N 4.4825°E
- Visitors: 76,315 (2008)
- Directors: Wayne Modest & Marieke van Bommel
- Website: https://leiden.wereldmuseum.nl/

Wereldmuseum Leiden (also known as Museum Volkenkunde) is a Rijksmuseum in the Netherlands located in the university city of Leiden. As of 2014, the museum, along with Wereldmuseum Amsterdam, in Amsterdam, and Wereldmuseum Rotterdam, together make up the National Museum of World Cultures.

== First ethnographic museum in Europe ==
The institution was at first called the "Museum Japonicum". It was the first museum in Europe which was designed to demonstrate that collecting the artefacts of humans could mean more than the mere accumulation of curiosities. From the very outset, the institution incorporated at least four basic principles: collecting, scientific research, presentation to the public, and educational guidance.

In 1816 the Koninklijk Kabinet van Zeldzaamheden was formed in the Hague as an attempt to start a museum of scientific artifacts from around the world, based on royal collections and a large group of Chinese artifacts from private collections. Thanks to the early efforts of this organization, in the early 1830s, when Philipp Franz Balthasar von Siebold abandoned the political turmoil of revolutionary Belgium for the relative calm of the University of Leiden, he was inspired by the first museum director R.P. van de Kasteele to collect Japanese objects for his collection. The resulting gift of about 5,000 objects became the heart the new museum's holdings. Siebold's home in Leiden—and the objects he brought to Europe after eight years in Japan—was opened to the public in the early 1830s (today his collection is preserved in the SieboldHuis). The Dutch crown had previously purchased the smaller collections of Jan Cock Blomhoff in 1826 and Johannes Gerhard Frederik van Overmeer Fischer in 1832. These which were merged with what Siebold bestowed on King William I; and they became crucial elements in the creation of what became the Museum voor Volkenkunde, or Ethnographic Museum in Leiden in 1837. This institution would later evolve into the National Museum of Ethnology and later, in 2023, Wereldmuseum Leiden.

In 1843, Siebold also encouraged other Europeans to create ethnographic institutions similar to what was developing in Leiden. He urged "the importance of their creation in European states possessing colonies because these institutions could become a means for understanding the subject peoples and of awakening the interest of the public and of merchants -- all of which are necessary conditions for a lucrative trade which benefits all."

== Museum holdings ==
Design on the front of the Leiden Plate, a famous Maya belt plaque made of jadeite from Guatemala held by the museum.

The collection today contains a large number of objects from Africa, China, Indonesia, Japan, Korea, Latin America, North America, Oceania, and Asia. In developing the collection, the museum has devoted significant attention to acquiring material which illustrates the historical development of world cultures; but the genesis of the museum's holdings began with material garnered during the years Japan was officially closed except for one small island in Nagasaki harbor, Dejima.

An item displayed with particular relish is a Māori waka war canoe, along with video films of its use on the adjoining gracht.

=== Blomhoff collection ===
As Opperhoofd (or chief trader) for the Dutch East India Company (Vereenigde Oostindische Compagnie or VOC) at Dejima island in Nagasaki harbor from 1817 through 1823, Jan Cock Blomhoff was unique. Despite the Japanese "closed door" policy for Westerners (sakoku), he did transport his wife, Titia, and children to join him. The Japanese predictably responded by ejecting both Blomhoff and his family; but that experience did broaden the range of household goods and other objects he accumulated across the span of his stay in Japan.

=== Fischer collection ===
Johannes Gerhard Frederik van Overmeer Fischer began as a clerk at Dejima and he was later promoted to warehouse master (pakhuismeester). During the span of his stay in Japan, Fisher's access to Japanese culture was limited; but within his universe of contacts, he was able to amass a considerable collection of "ordinary" objects which were plausibly overlooked by others. This material was brought back to the Netherlands in 1829. In 1833, he published Bijdrage tot de kennis van het Japansche rijk (Contribution to the knowledge of the Japanese Empire).

=== Siebold collection ===
As a physician practicing Western medicine in Nagasaki (1823–1829), Philipp Franz von Siebold received payment in kind with a variety of objects and artifacts which would later gain unanticipated scholarly attention in Europe. These everyday objects later became the basis of his large ethnographic collection, which consisted of everyday household goods, woodblock prints, tools and hand-crafted objects used by the Japanese people in the late Edo period. Further information relating to this material was published in Siebold's Nippon. His professional interest was especially drawn to implements used in the practice of traditional Japanese medicine. As of 2005, a separate museum located in one of Siebold's former houses, the SieboldHuis, houses part of the collection.

=== "Decolonizing" the collections ===
In 2023, the Leiden "World Museum" was in the process of repatriating some of its best known Indonesian art works. Another candidate for repatriation may be the Leiden plate, an important Maya belt plaque from Guatemala that some consider should be returned to that country, where it constitutes an object of national pride.

In 2025, the museum agreed to repatriate 119 artefacts, including some of the Benin Bronzes, to Nigeria.

== Gallery ==
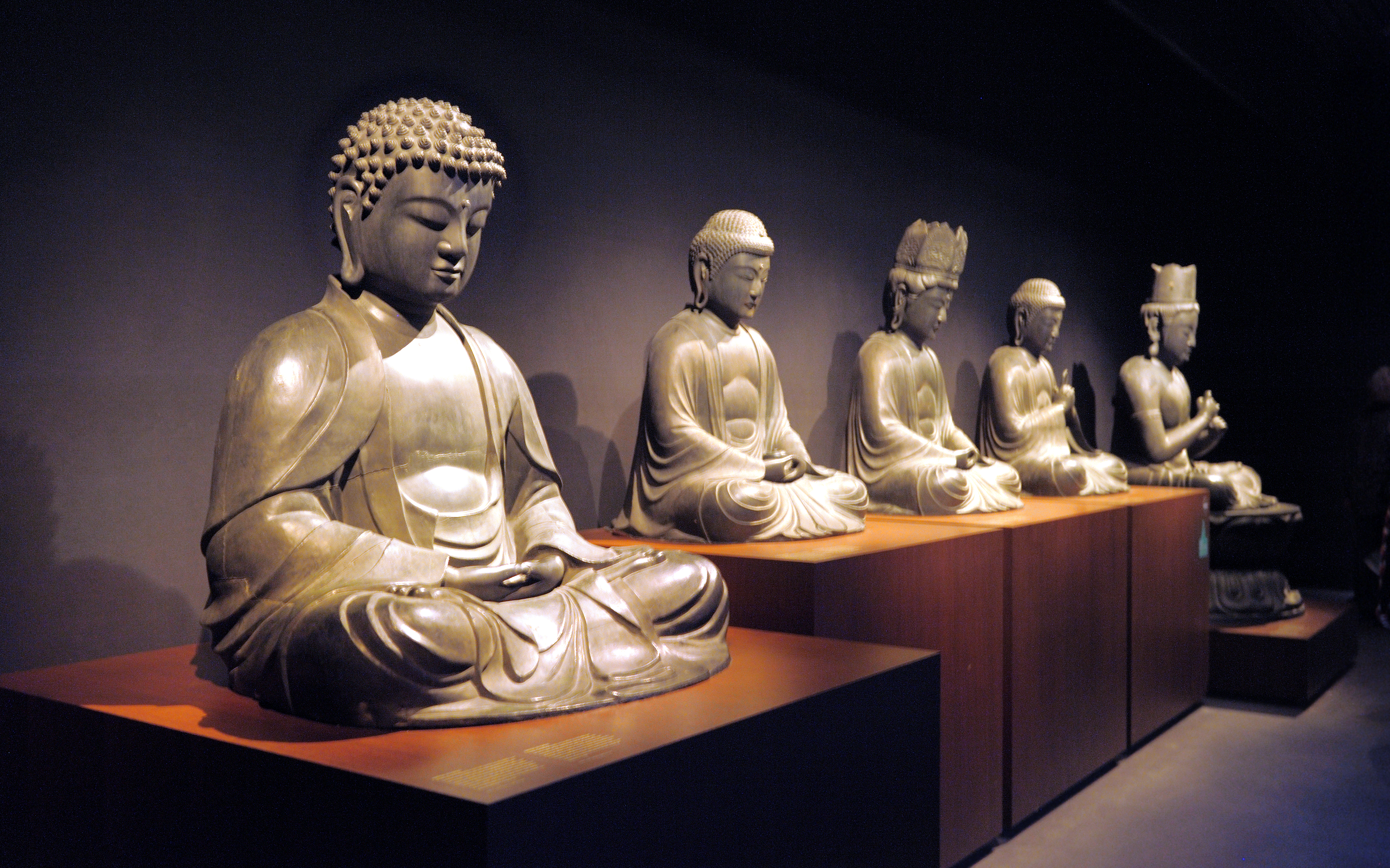
Buddha statues from Japan, acquired by the museum in 1883 at the International Colonial Trade Exposition in Amsterdam

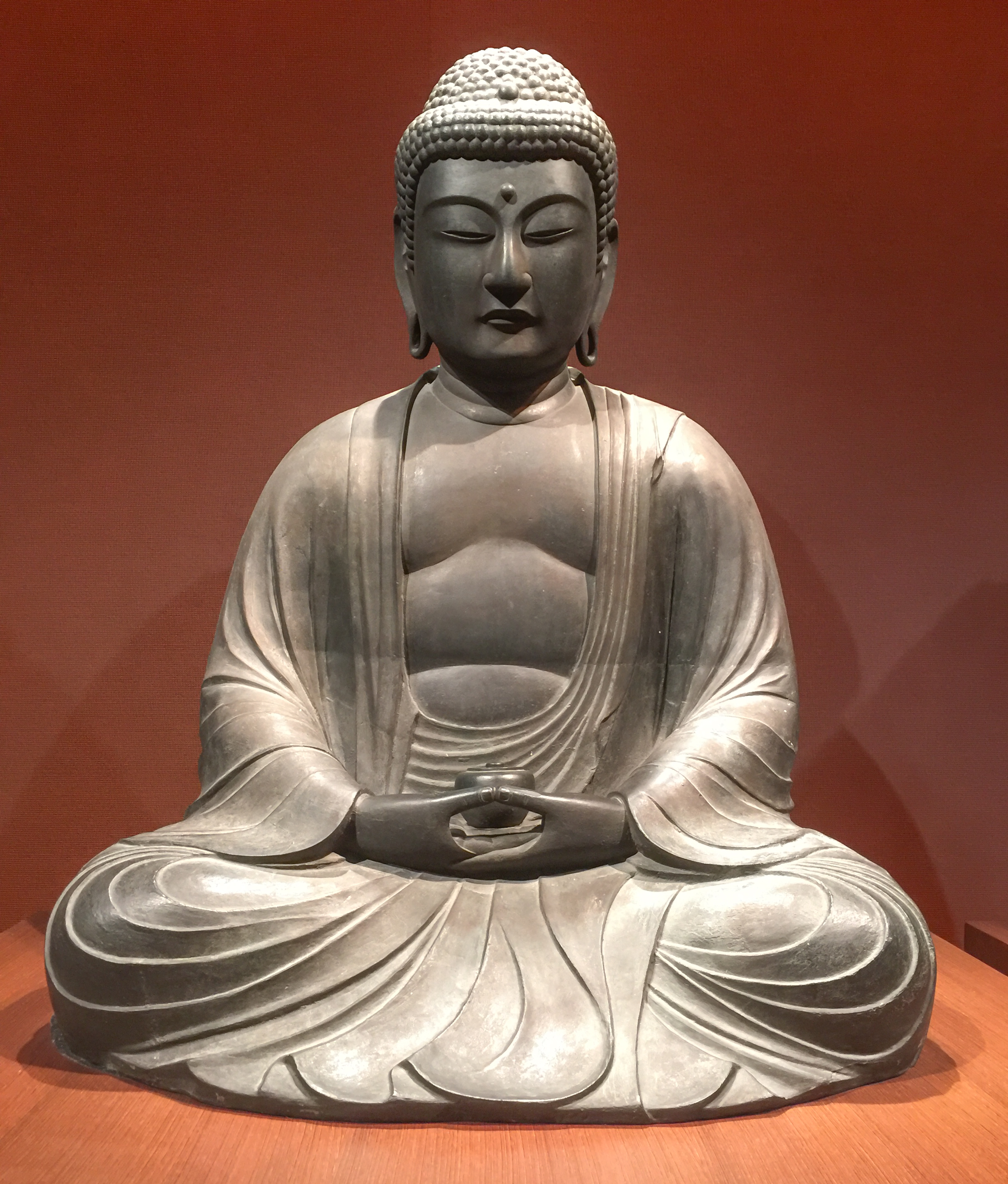
Yakushi Nyorai (the Healing Buddha) – This Buddha (and two other center pieces) originate from a mausoleum for the Togukawa shoguns at the Zōjōji temple in Edo.

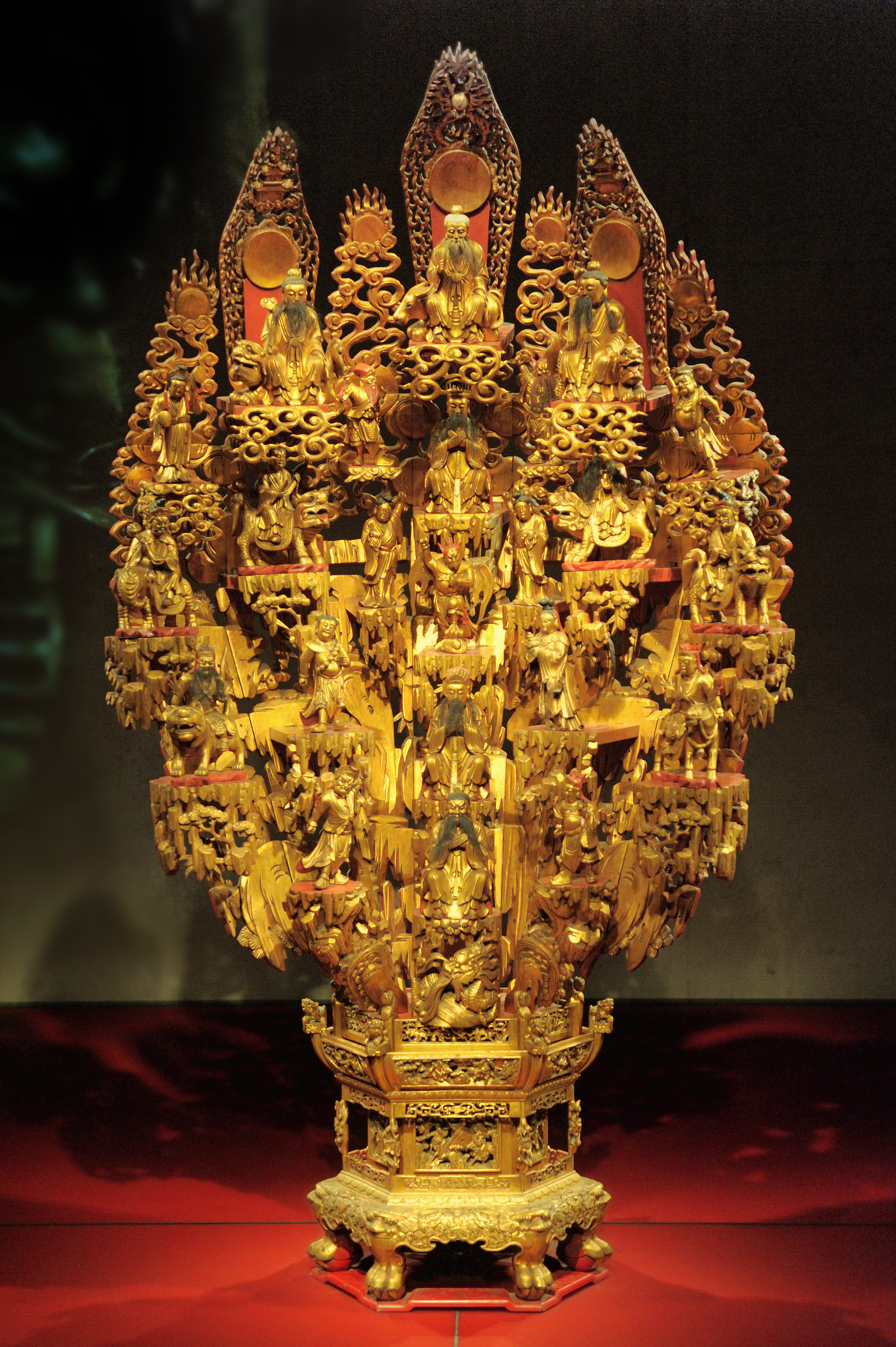
"Mountain of the Immortals", from China

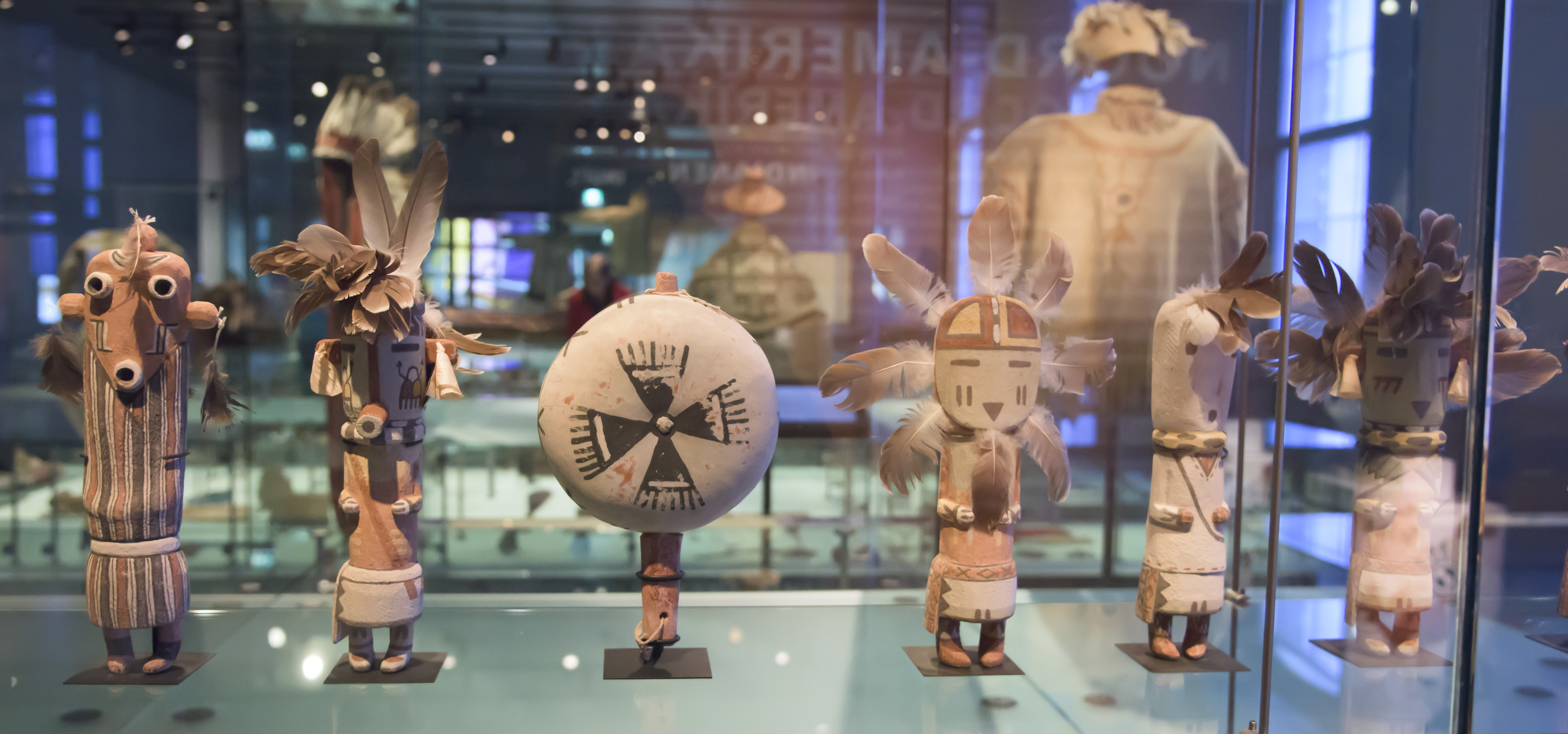
Pueblo Kachina dolls, southwestern United States

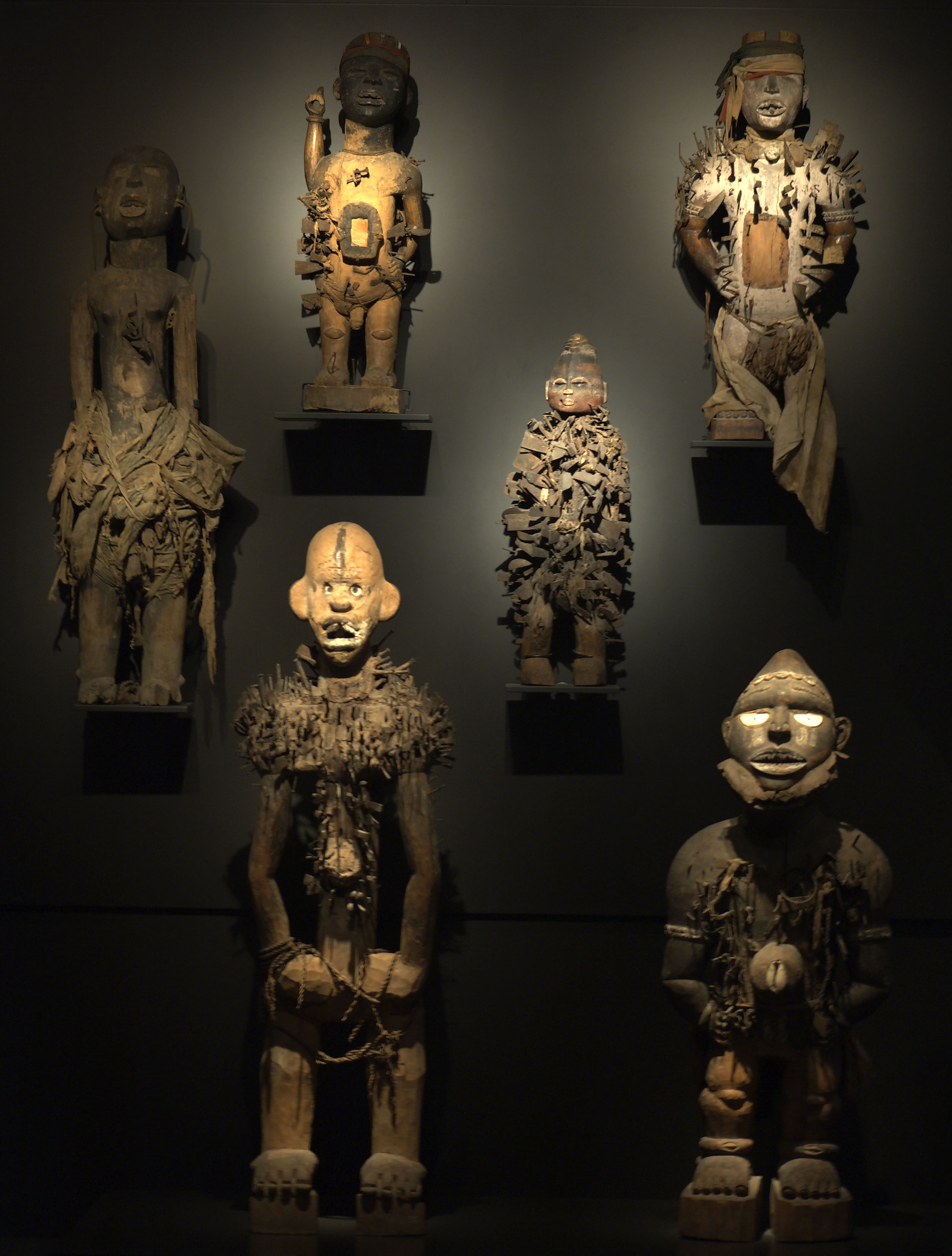
Nkisi nkondi, (Mangaaka), Central Africa, 1880–1900 CE

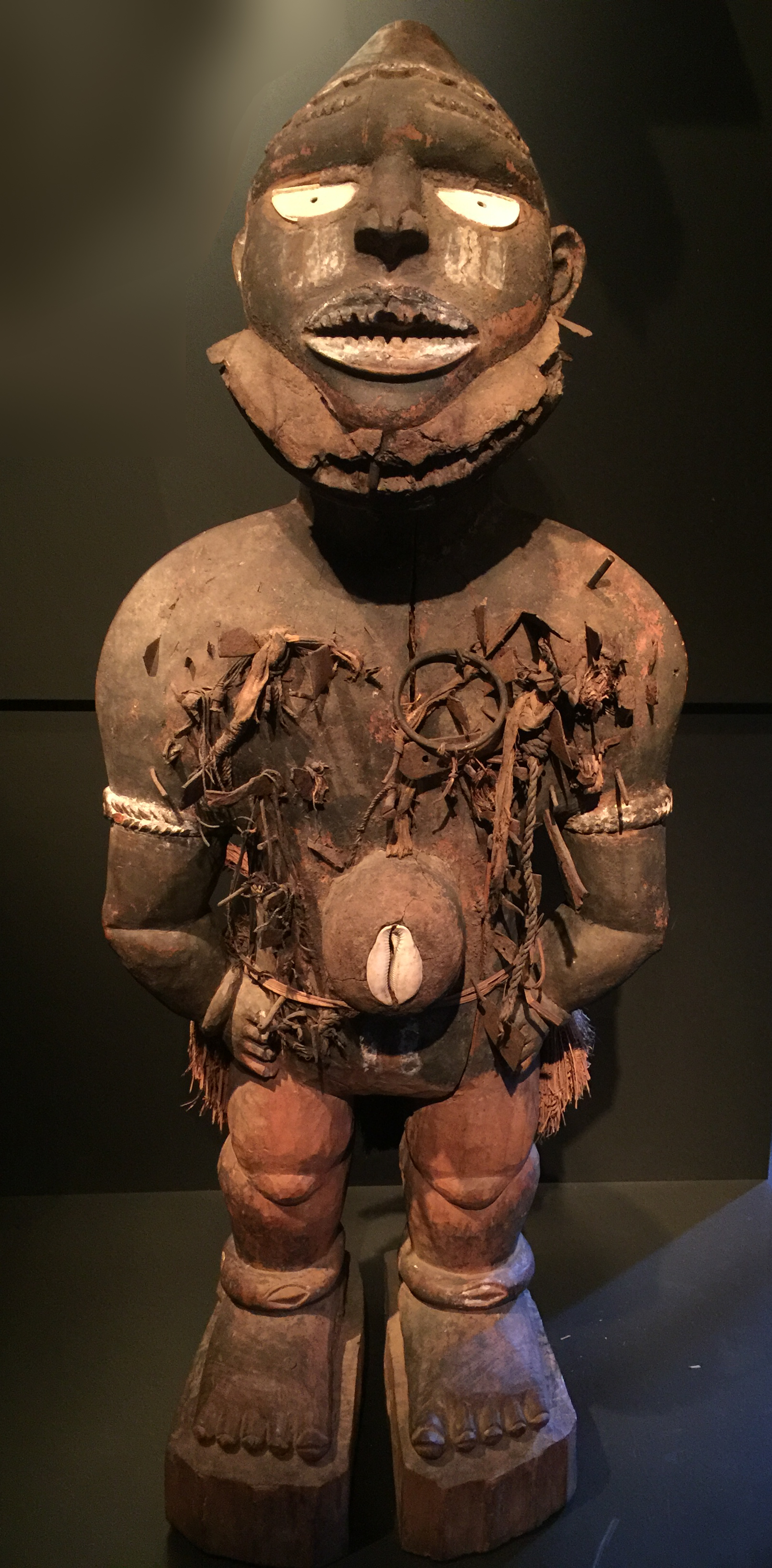
Nkisi nkondi

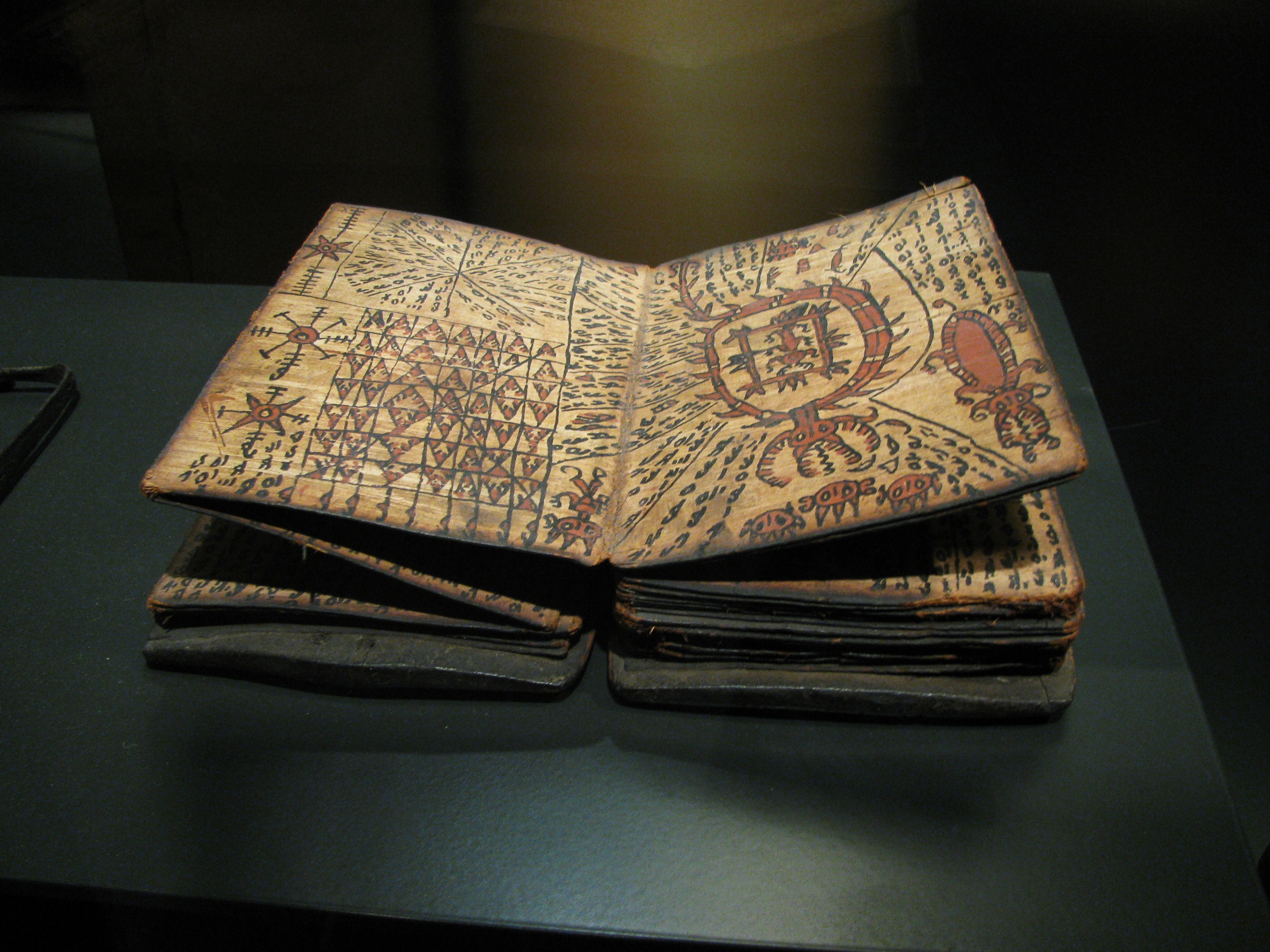
Book of Wizards of the Batak Toba people of Indonesia

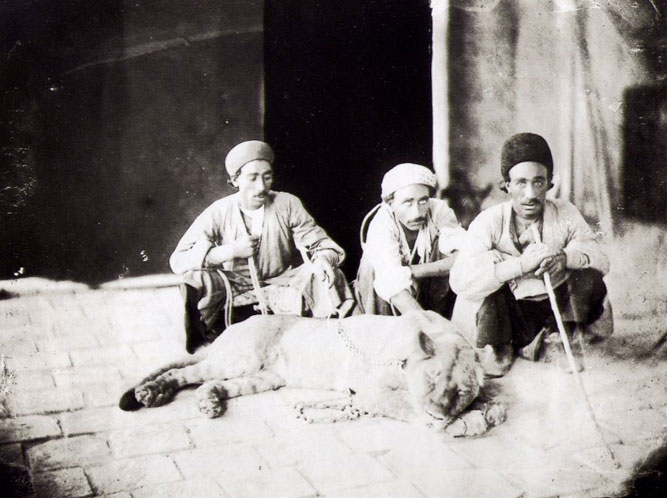
Men with a live lion in Iran. Photograph by Antoin Sevruguin (1830s–1933)

== See also ==
- Nationaal Museum van Wereldculturen
- Wereldmuseum Amsterdam
- Wereldmuseum Rotterdam
- Edo-Tokyo Museum
- National Museum of Ethnology, Japan
- The Virtual Collection of Masterpieces
