= Leyden plaque =

Mayan archaeological artifact

The Leyden plaque, sometime called Leiden plate or Leiden plaque, is a jadeite belt plate from the early classic period of the Maya civilization. Although the plate was found on the Caribbean coast, it may have been made in Tikal. The plate is now in the National Museum of Ethnology in Leiden, Netherlands, hence its official name. It is one of the oldest Maya objects using the Mesoamerican Long Count calendar.

== History ==
The plate was discovered by chance by a Dutch engineer, S.A. van Braam, in 1864. He was part of a team employed by a lumber company to dig a canal near present-day Puerto Barrios, in the lower Motagua Valley, a border area of Guatemala and Honduras. The team transected what looked like an ancient Central-American funeral mound. There, together with copper bells and pottery fragments, the little jade plate was found. The plate was taken to the Netherlands in 1864 and gifted to the National Museum of Ethnology.

The first scientific description of the plate was made by Leeman in 1877, and many others followed, notably Holden in 1880 and Valentine in 1881, who started deciphering the inscriptions. A lot of ground work on the dating of the plate was done in 1938 by Frances and Sylvanus Morley. Their study remains one of the more conclusive made on the plate.

The date on the plate was used to study time and calendar in the Maya world, and the plate remains one of the earliest examples of the usage of a cyclical calendar in the Central-American world. It is remarkable for being the oldest known usage of a Maya ordinal zero, which symbol (graphically derived from the drawing of a sitting man, typically representing a king's crowning) appears two times, one to form the date "0 Yaxkin" from the first day of the seventh month of the festive year in Haab' calendar, and one to denote the Moon-Bird king accessing its throne on the other side of the plaque.

== Description ==
Carving on the Leiden Plate

The plaque is a small rectangular object of pale green jadeite measuring 21.7 by 8.6 centimeters. Its faces are carved with both drawings and glyphs. A hole at its top hints that it was used as a pendant, probably as a waist plate. While it was found far from its possible original location of Tikal in a post-classic archeological context, it dates from the Early Classic era. It poses as an example of precious object preserved and used several centuries after its making, which is common in Mesoamerica.

The front face has a picture of a richly-dressed man. His head and the lower part of his body are seen from profile, but his breast is turned toward the front, with the feet placed one behind the other. It represents a victorious lord, possibly an otherwise-unknown ruler of Tikal, wearing six celts and some trophy heads around his waist, standing with bound captives he vanquished. He also carries an atlatl, or two head serpent, in his hand. The serpents have a human head in their mouth, a characteristic feature of the Sun God. The motif of the inauguration of a ruler depicted on the Leiden Plate is a common one, similar carvings being found on stelae and other celts around the Maya world.

The plaque's posterior face has been engraved with an inscription bearing traces of cinnabar, documenting the crowning of a king on 15 September 320 (Gregorian) in the Long Count calendar, one of the earliest registered dates of the Maya Classic period. The inscription is composed of fifteen glyphs neatly carved in one column. The date written is 8.14.3.1.12 1 Eb 0 Yaxk'in (15 September 320 A.D. using the Goodman-Martinez-Thompson correlation). The plate probably represents the accession of a ruler. This accession may have happened at the Moon-Zero-Bird Place and involved a ruler named Way Ko? Chanal Chak Wak.

For a long time authors considered "Moon-Zero-Bird", to be the name of the king (despite carrying the NAL-"place" affix) and one of the first kings of the Tikal dynasty. This interpretation is contested in recent publications: though the plaque may be tied with Tikal, there is no hard evidence of this, and "Moon-Zero-Bird" does not appear in Tikal dynastic listings. It does, however, appear as a place name associated with creation and the Maize god at Tikal on Stela 31.

== The Leyden Plaque today ==
The Leyden Plaque is now displayed in the Central-American gallery of the National Museum of Ethnology in Leiden, the Netherlands. Formerly, its original archaeological context was shown as well, but for unknown reasons, this has been removed from the permanent exhibition.

The Leyden Plaque is the most recognisable object of the museum collection, with replicas gifted to museums, politicians and organisations around the world. Its image is also featured on the one quetzal bank note, the Guatemalan currency unit, after it was chosen as one of the national symbols of Guatemala in 2006.

Some controversy exists regarding the object's ownership. During the 1988 "Blood of Kings" Maya exhibition in the Kimbell Art Museum, Texas, the National Museum of Ethnology of Leiden asked for a Declaration of Immunity From Public Seizure in order to protect the plate . It is highly doubtful, however, if the object could legitimately and legally be classified as "looted art"; in the opposite case, 2020 Dutch policy guidelines would make its repatriation to Guatemala almost inescapable.

== Bibliography ==
Éric Taladoire & Brigitte Faugère-Kalfon, Archéologie et art précolombiens: la Mésoamérique, École du Louvre, 1995
