= Maya belt plaques =

Item worn by Maya rulers

Maya belt plaques were decorative and functional pendants worn by ancient Maya ajawob (rulers) to validate their rulership through referencing major deities and important ancestors. They can be seen as significant elements of the costumes of rulers on stelae and in other representations found in ancient Maya art. These plaques, which hung from belts, were used during rituals to memorialize important events and dates.

Design on the front of the Leiden Plaque, a Maya belt plaque in the National Museum of Ethnology (Netherlands) that depicts an early ruler of Tikal standing on top of a vanquished enemy.

== Description ==
Belt plaques were usually carved from jadeite, which was a precious stone because of it had to be traded from the Motagua River in Guatemala, making this stone a precious and valuable material. On one side of the plaque was a beautifully decorated ruler with a left-facing profile and on the other side was a double-column hieroglyphic inscription explaining the significance of the plaque. They display rulers on their inauguration, important calendar dates and ancestral and deity worship.

== Interpretations ==
David Mora-Marin asserts that wearing these belts were based on "symbolic (ideology and ritual) and objective (staple and wealth) sources of power." The ancient Maya stimulated all senses of the human body, the natural world and the invisible world. The sounds of the plaques hitting together would have made a tinkling sounds, which would have been especially noticeable during dance rituals. Maya rulers were seen as divine through ancestry and closest to the gods, therefore, wearing these belts during rituals and death was a way of communicating and celebrating the gods and their ancestors.

== Examples ==
The most famous example is the Leiden Plaque (sometimes referred to as the Leiden Plate), discovered in 1864 in Bahia de Graciosa in northern Guatemala and named for its location in the collection of the National Museum of Ethnology in Leiden, Netherlands. Dated from the Early Classic period and is believed to have come originally from the central lowlands Petén Basin of Guatemala, more specifically, the Maya site of Tikal. It is an important artifact to ancient Maya archaeology because it has one of the earliest known Maya hieroglyphic inscriptions.

Maya belt plaques can also be seen in the costumes of Maya ajawob (rulers) on the stelae of sites such as Copán in Honduras.

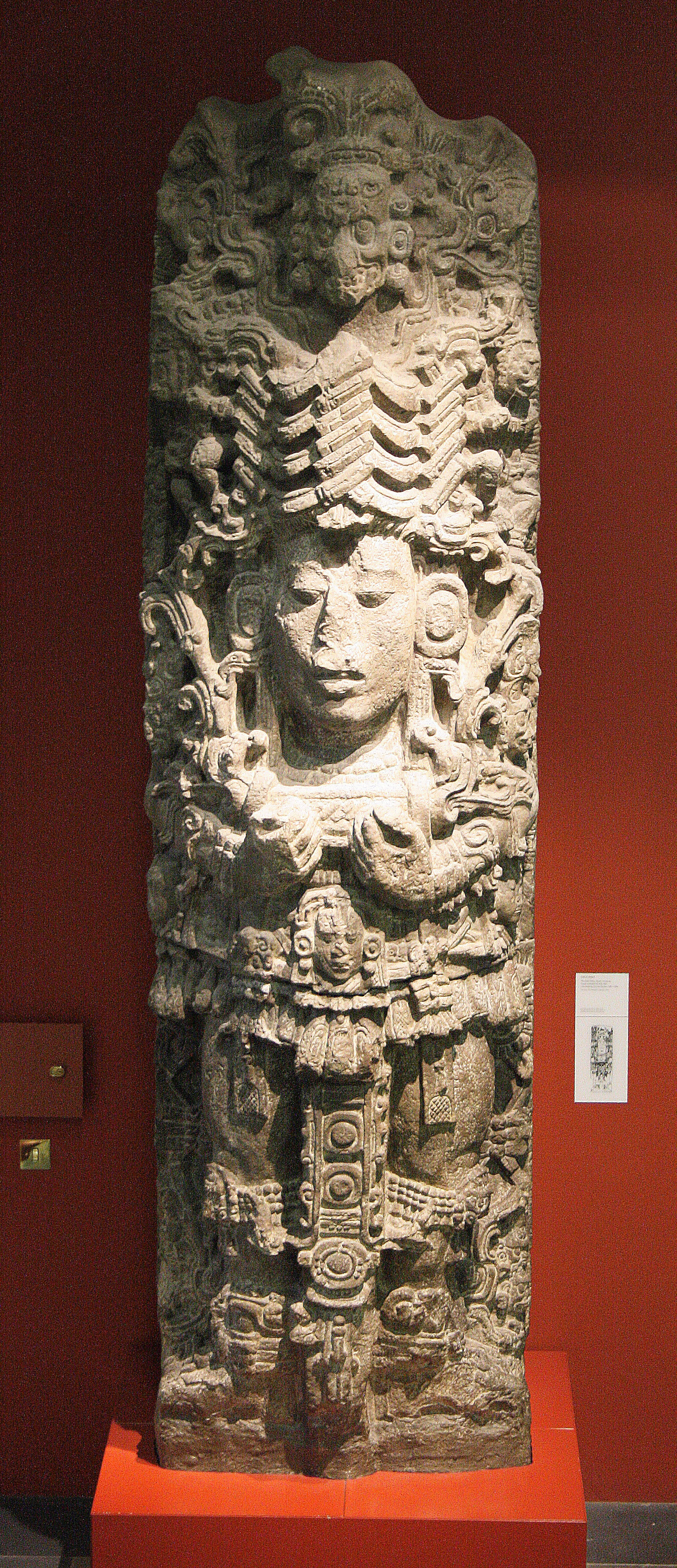
Stela A, Copán. Note the three jade plaques hanging from the center of the ruler's belt assemblage.
