= Virtual Collection of Asian Masterpieces =

- Screenshot
- Website type: search platform to a collection of Asian masterpieces
- Owners: National Museum of Ethnology, Rijksmuseum Volkenkunde, Leiden (The Netherlands)
- Website: Virtual Collection of Asian Masterpieces
- Commercial: no
- Launched: 13 September 2007
- Current status: version 3.0

The Virtual Collection of Asian Masterpieces (VCM) shares more than 2,700 Masterpieces of Asian culture online. Since its launch in 2007 more than 145 museums in Asia and Europe have joined the VCM.

The VCM is originally a project of the ASEMUS - the Asia-Europe Museums Network. The VCM is now led by a consortium of five Asian and European museums:

- National Museum of Korea, Seoul, South Korea
- Chester Beatty Library, Dublin, Ireland
- National Museum of Ethnology (Rijksmuseum Volkenkunde), Leiden, The Netherlands
- Tropenmuseum, Amsterdam, The Netherlands
- Museum of World Culture, Gothenburg, Sweden
