= SieboldHuis =

Museum in Leiden, the Netherlands

Japan Museum SieboldHuis
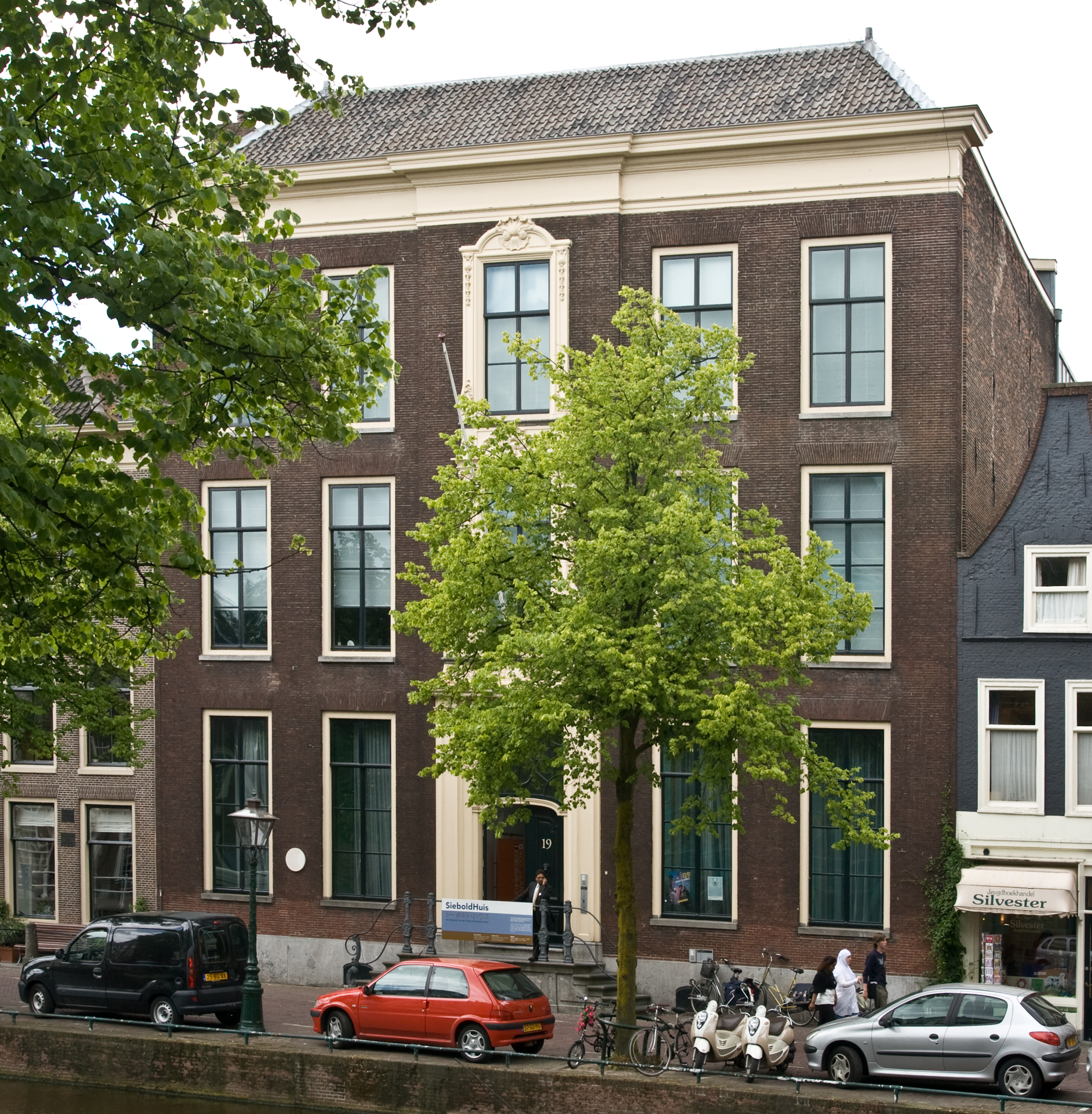
- Established: 2000 (temporary); 2005 (permanent)
- Location: Rapenburg 19, Leiden
- Coordinates: 52°9′35″N 4°29′5″E
- Director: Kris Schiermeier
- Website: http://www.sieboldhuis.org/

Japan Museum SieboldHuis (Siebold House) is a museum located at the Rapenburg (Leiden) in Leiden, Netherlands. It displays items that were collected by Philipp Franz von Siebold (1796-1866) between 1823 and 1829 during his stay at Dejima, the Dutch trade colony nearby Nagasaki in Japan. It also functions as a museum of Japanese culture.

Mission statement: "The aim of Japan Museum SieboldHuis ’Stichting Japanmuseum SieboldHuis’ is to exhibit (museum) collections relevant to Japanese art, culture, science and nature, in particular the Leiden Siebold Collection, as well as to strengthen the ties between the Netherlands and Japan and to promote Japan Museum SieboldHuis as museum and information centre."

Siebold was highly interested in all aspects of Japanese nature and culture, and as such his collection is very diverse. Japan Museum SieboldHuis has a permanent exhibition of maps, rocks, animals, plants, utensils and art. Temporary exhibitions offer a varied selection of Japanese art.

The monumental house is property of the Dutch government (Government Buildings Agency) and used to house the cantonal court.

== Gallery ==
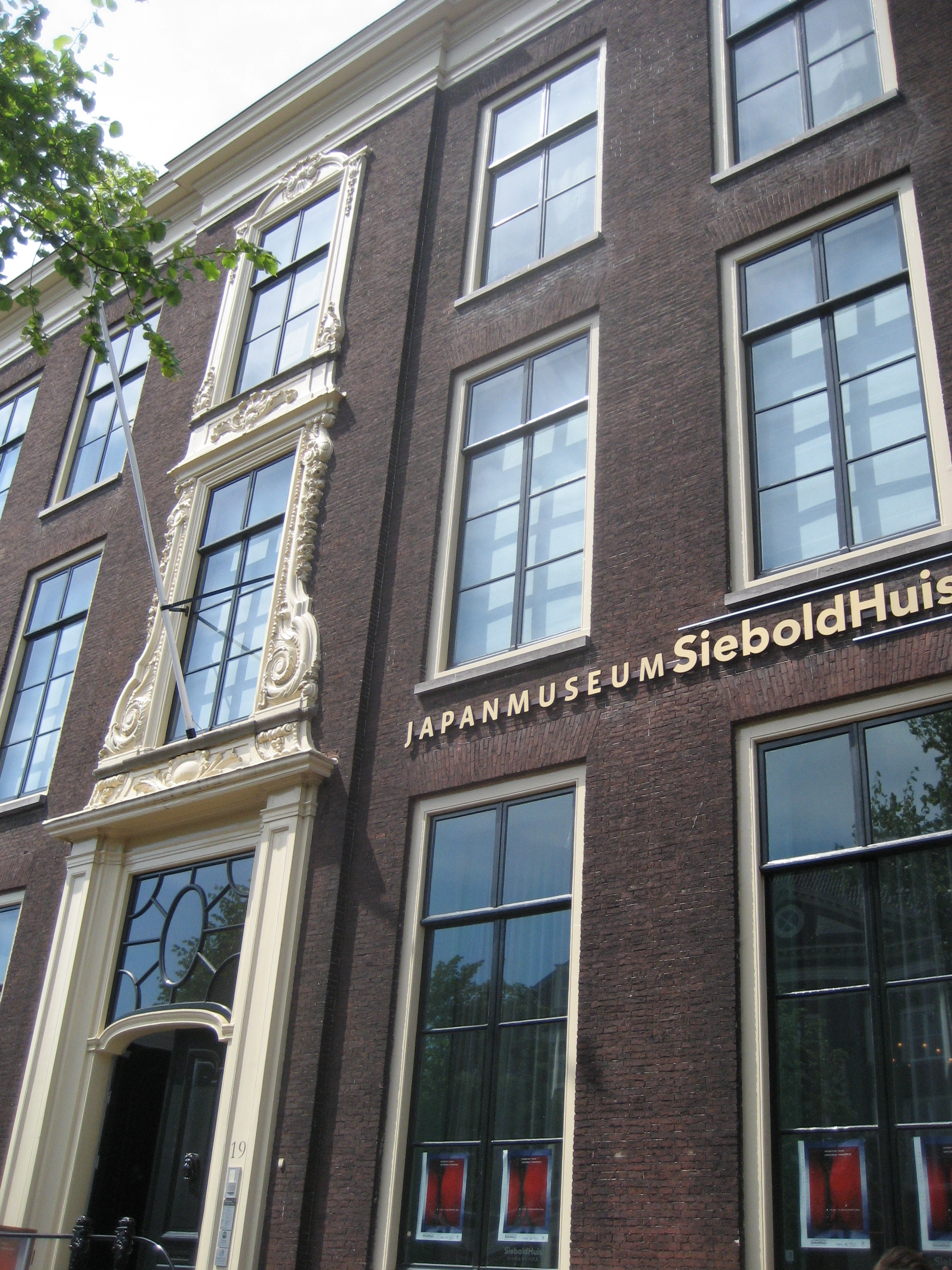
Front

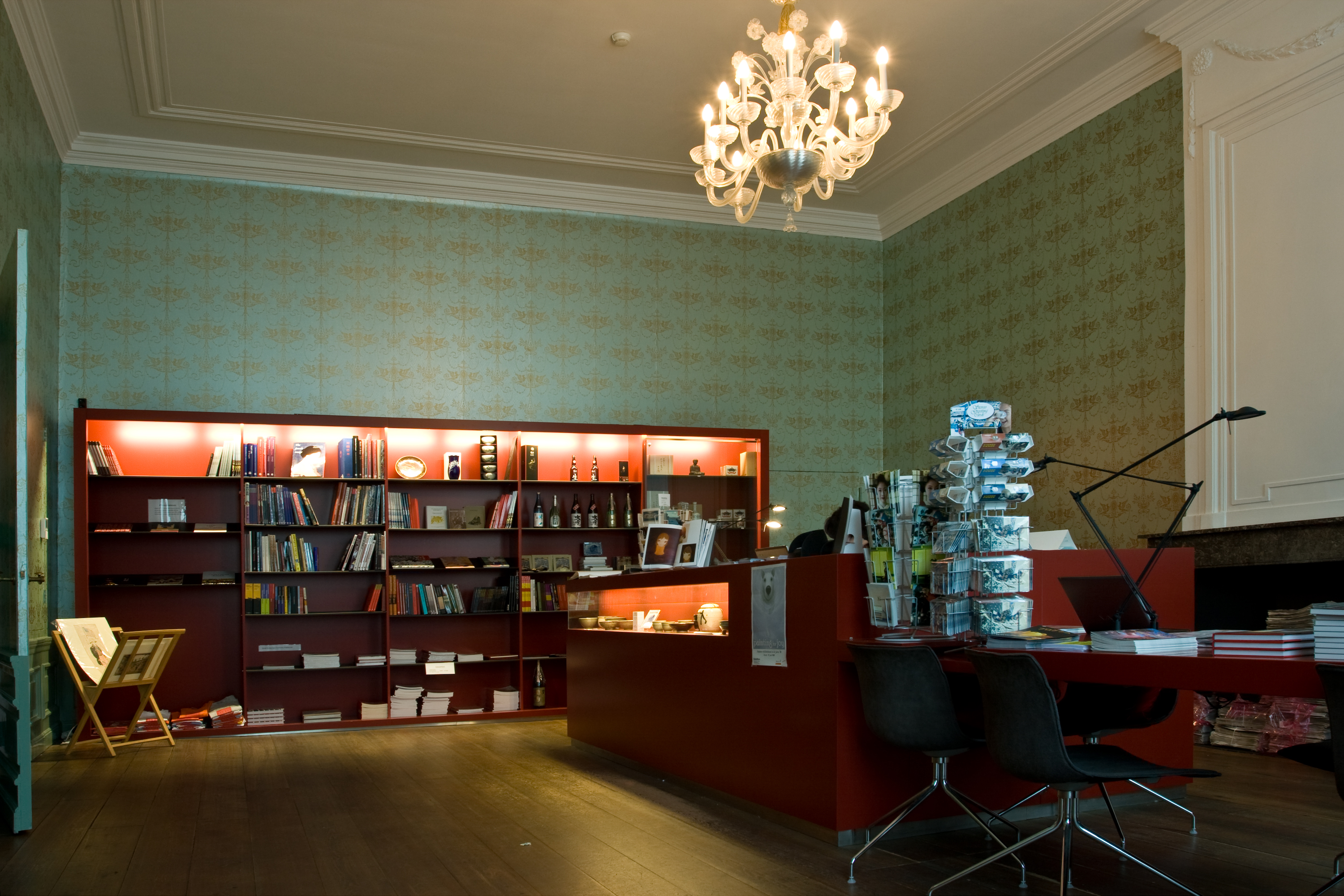
Reception room

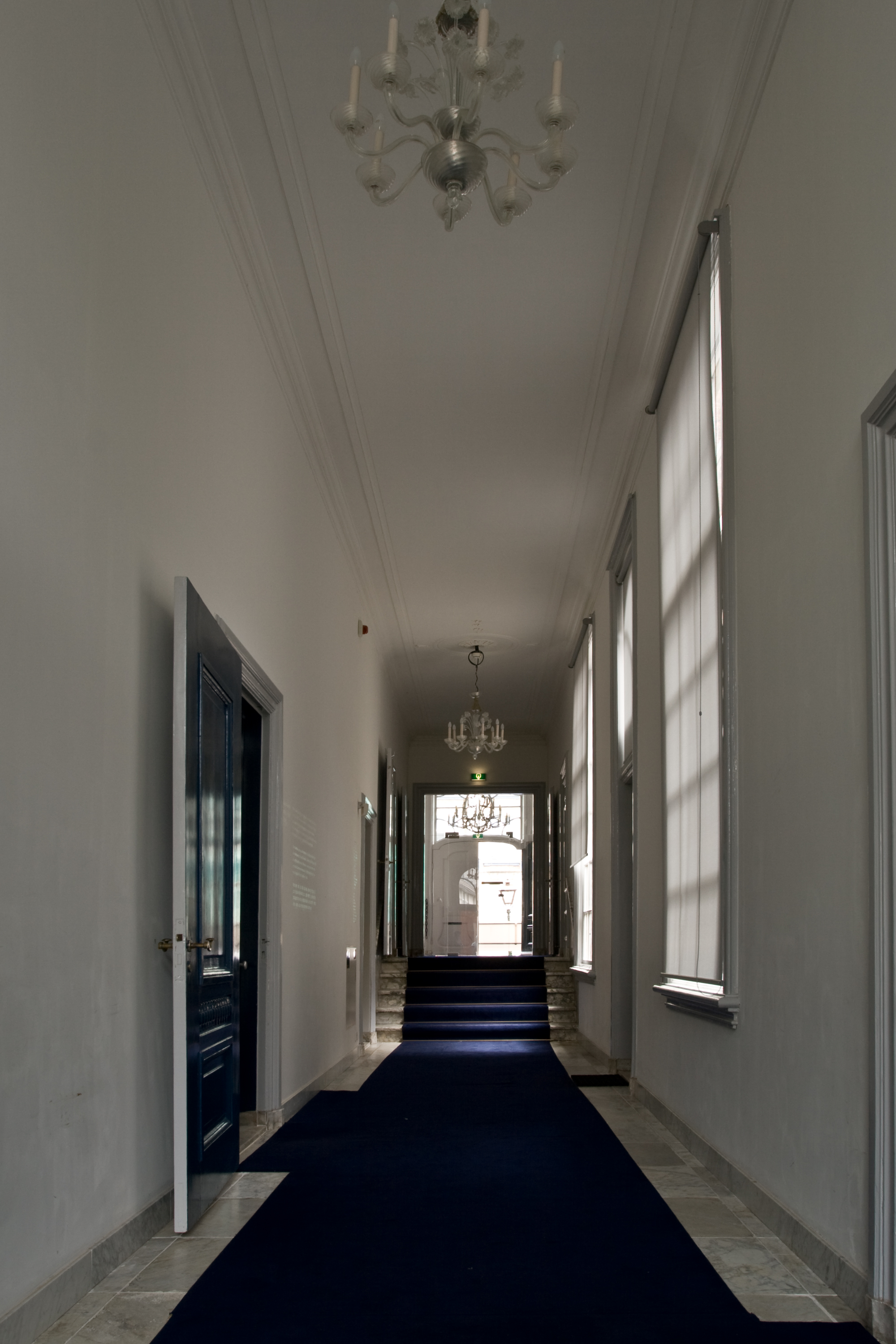
Halway

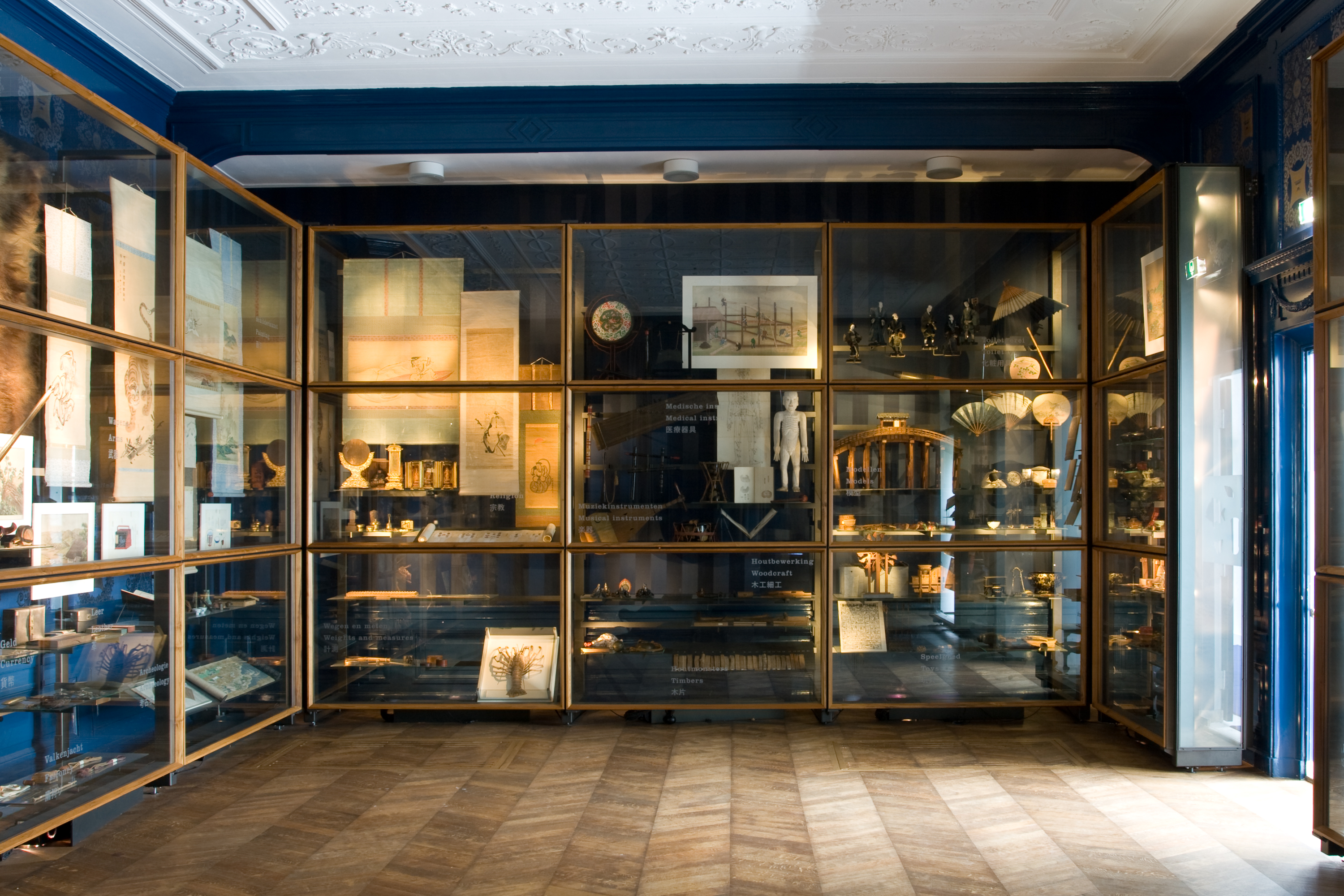
Panorama room

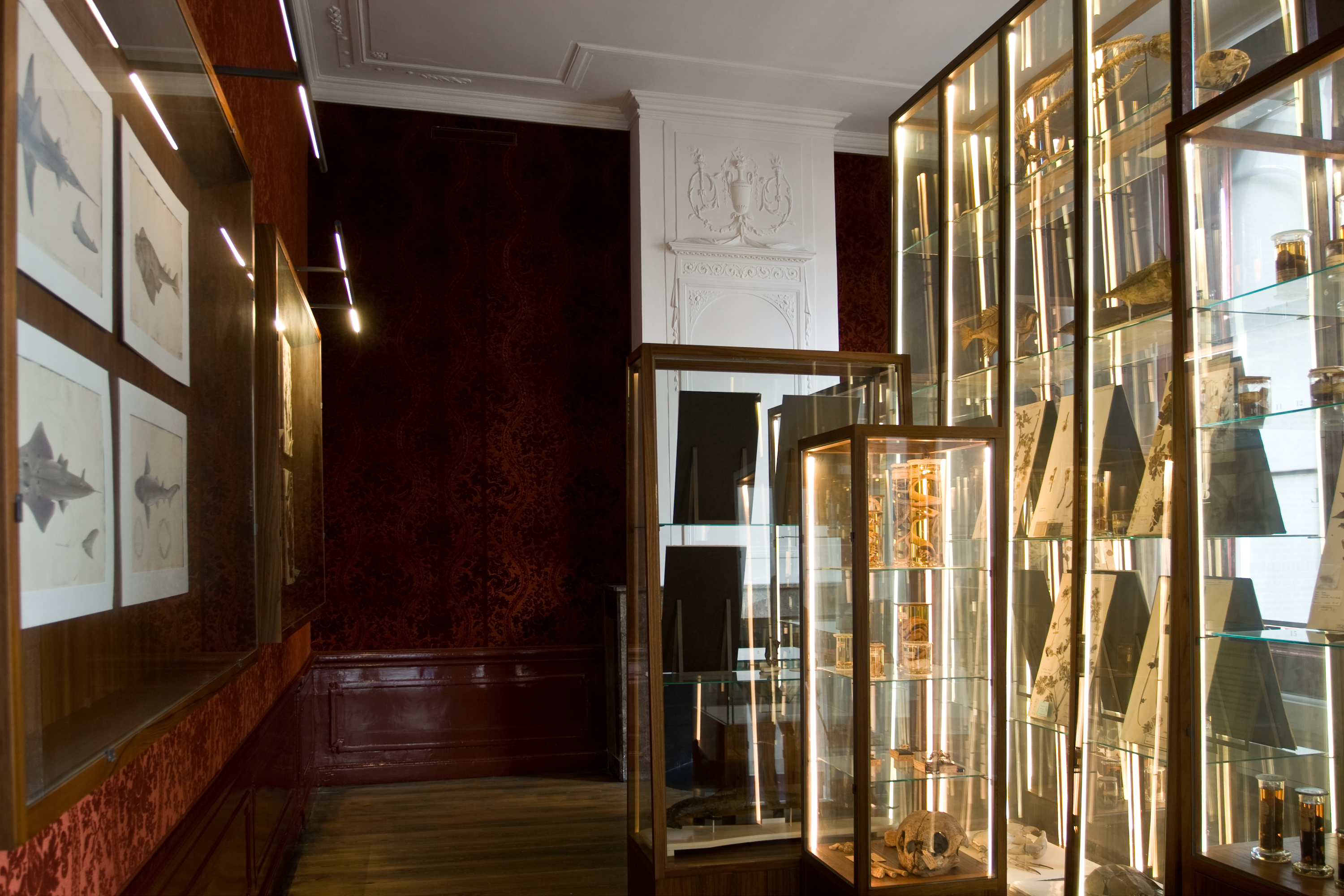
Flora and Fauna room

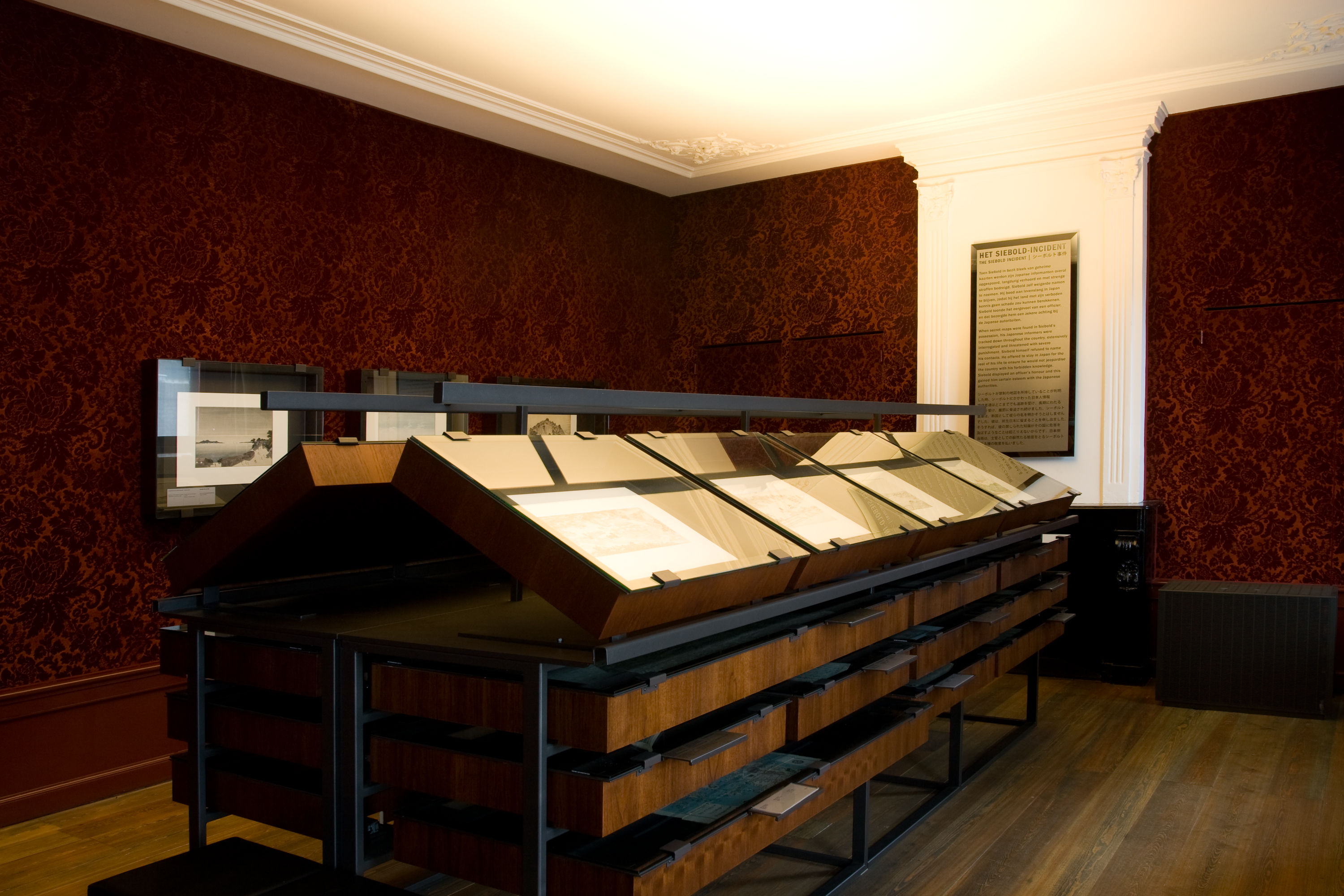
Map room

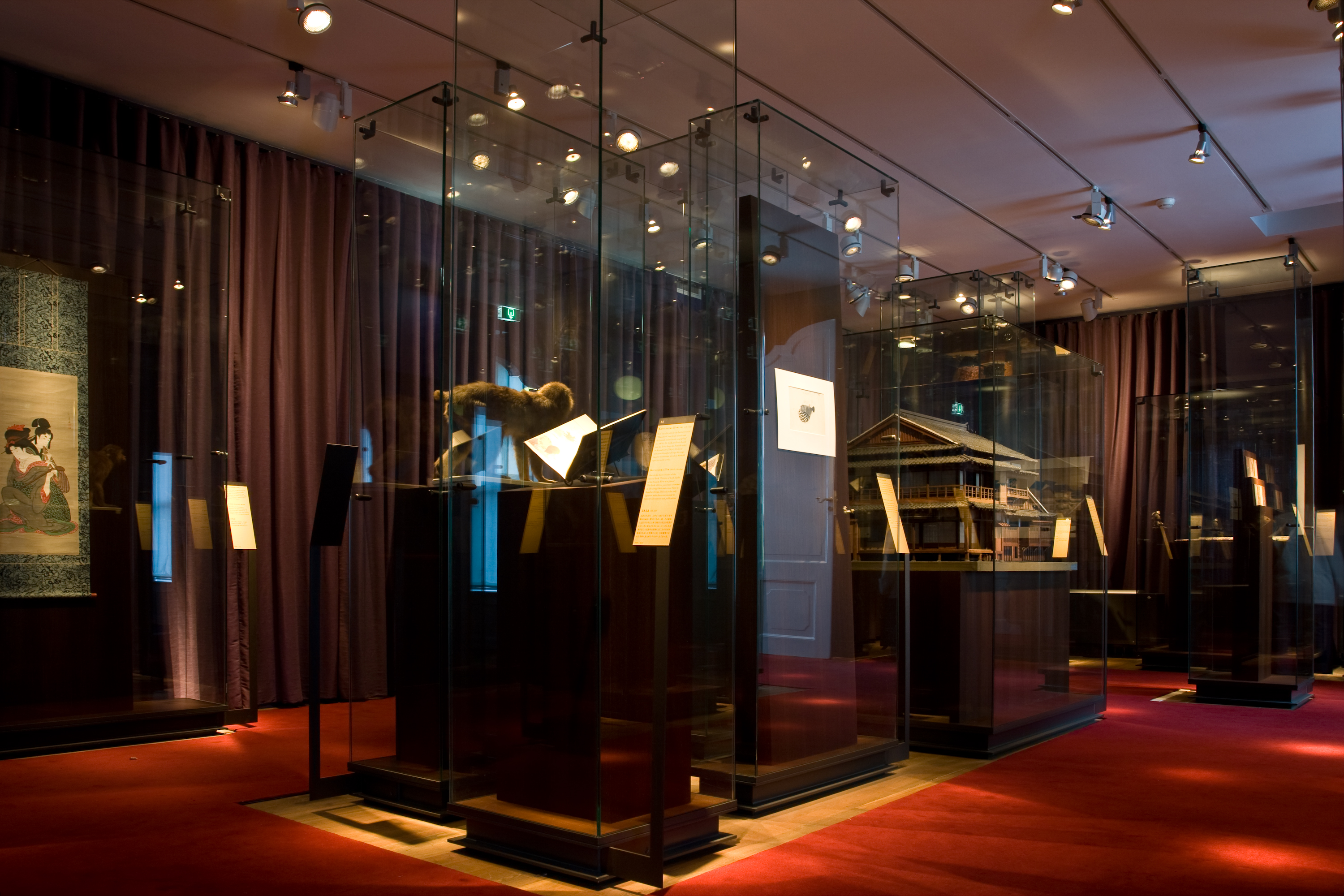
Treasure room

== See also ==
- Philipp Franz von Siebold: Siebold museums
